= Muralt =

Muralt (also de Muralt or von Muralt) is a surname and a given name. Notable people with the name include:

- Hanna Muralt Müller (born 1947), Swiss politician
- Alexander Ludwig von Muralt (1903–1990), Swiss physiologist and researcher
- Béat Louis de Muralt (1665–1749), Swiss military officer, author and travel writer
- Denyse Henriette de Muralt (1918–1998), the head of the Ducal Family of Saxe-Coburg and Gotha
- Eduard de Muralt (1808–1895), Swiss-German professor of theology, librarian, palaeographer
- Franz Ludwig von Muralt (1638–1684), Bernese officer in French service
- Jean de Muralt (1877–1947), Swiss lawyer, chairman of the Board of Governors of the League of Red Cross Societies
- Jeferey Muralt, paralympic athlete from New Zealand
- Johann Bernhard von Muralt (1634–1710), Bernese politician and envoy
- Paul Muralt, physicist at the Swiss Federal Institute of Technology, Lausanne, Switzerland
- Pierre Balthasar de Muralt (1921–2013), Swiss typographer and publisher
- Pierre de Muralt (1896–1985), Swiss equestrian

== See also ==
- Muralt Wall, small wall on top of a dyke, used as an alternative and cheaper way of raising the dykes
