= Anton von Graffenried =

Anton von Graffenried may refer to:

- Anton von Graffenried (died 1628) (1573–1628), Bernese politician and Schultheiss of Bern
- Anton von Graffenried (died 1674) (1597–1674), Bernese politician and Schultheiss of Bern, son of the above
- Anton von Graffenried, lord of Worb, father of Christoph von Graffenried, 1st Baron of Bernberg
