= Belper Hirn =

Swiss soft cheese

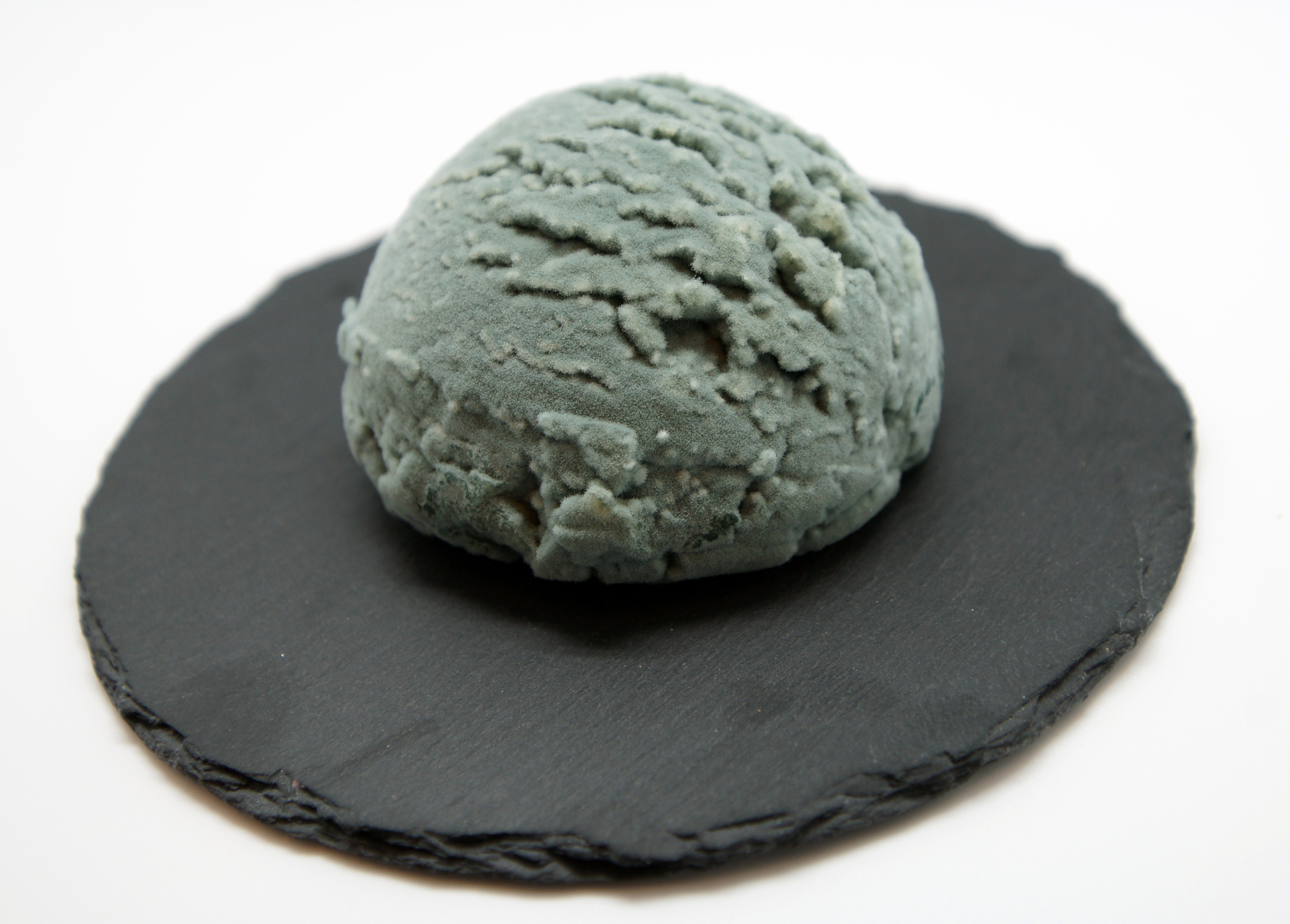
- Country of origin: Switzerland
- Town: Belp
- Source of milk: Cows
- Pasteurized: No
- Texture: soft
- Aging time: 1-6 weeks

The Belper Hirn (litt. "Belp Brain") is a Swiss soft cheese made from cow's milk in the city of Belp.

== Maturation ==
The cheese's main characteristic is the growing layer of mold on its outside.

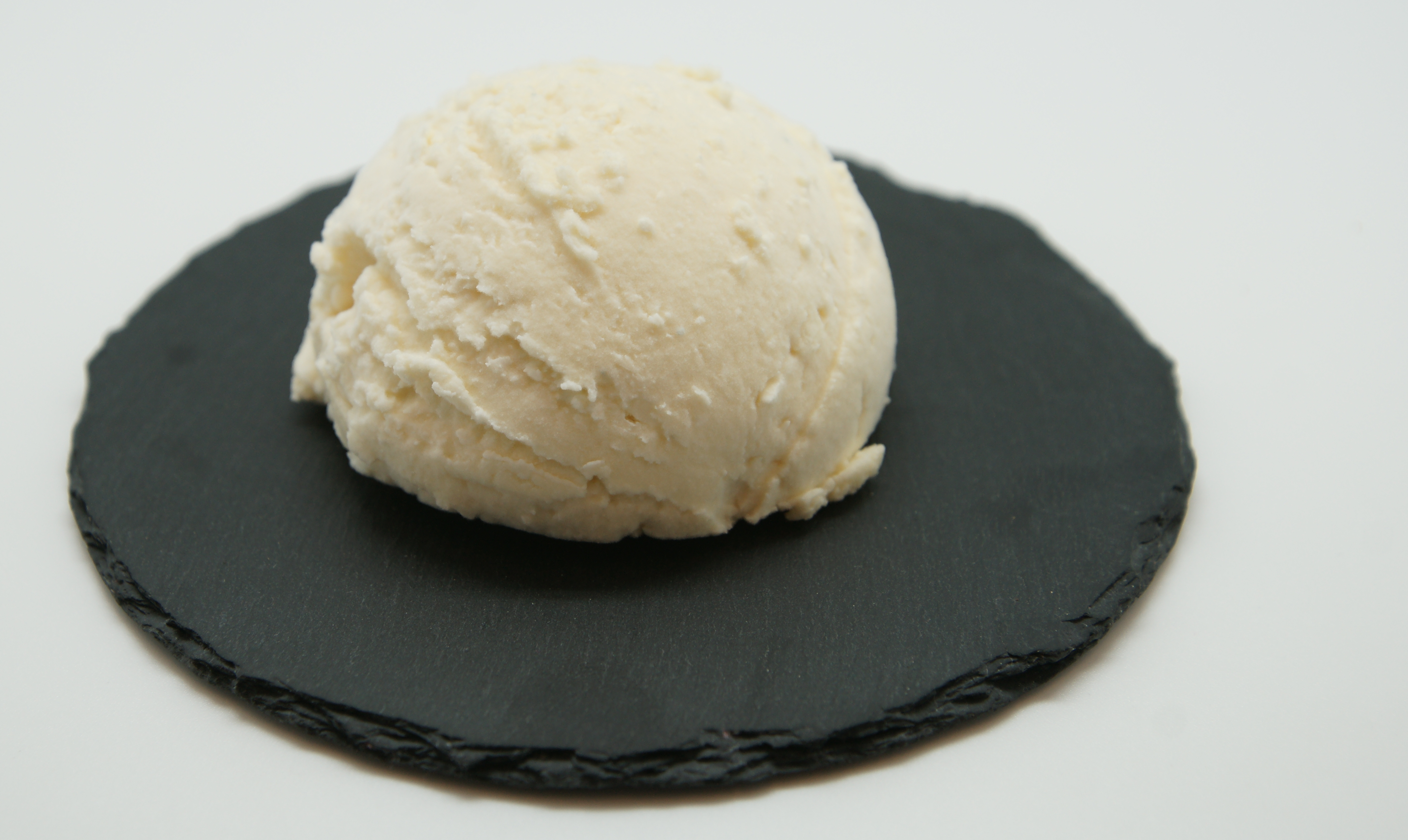
Belper Hirn after 1 week...

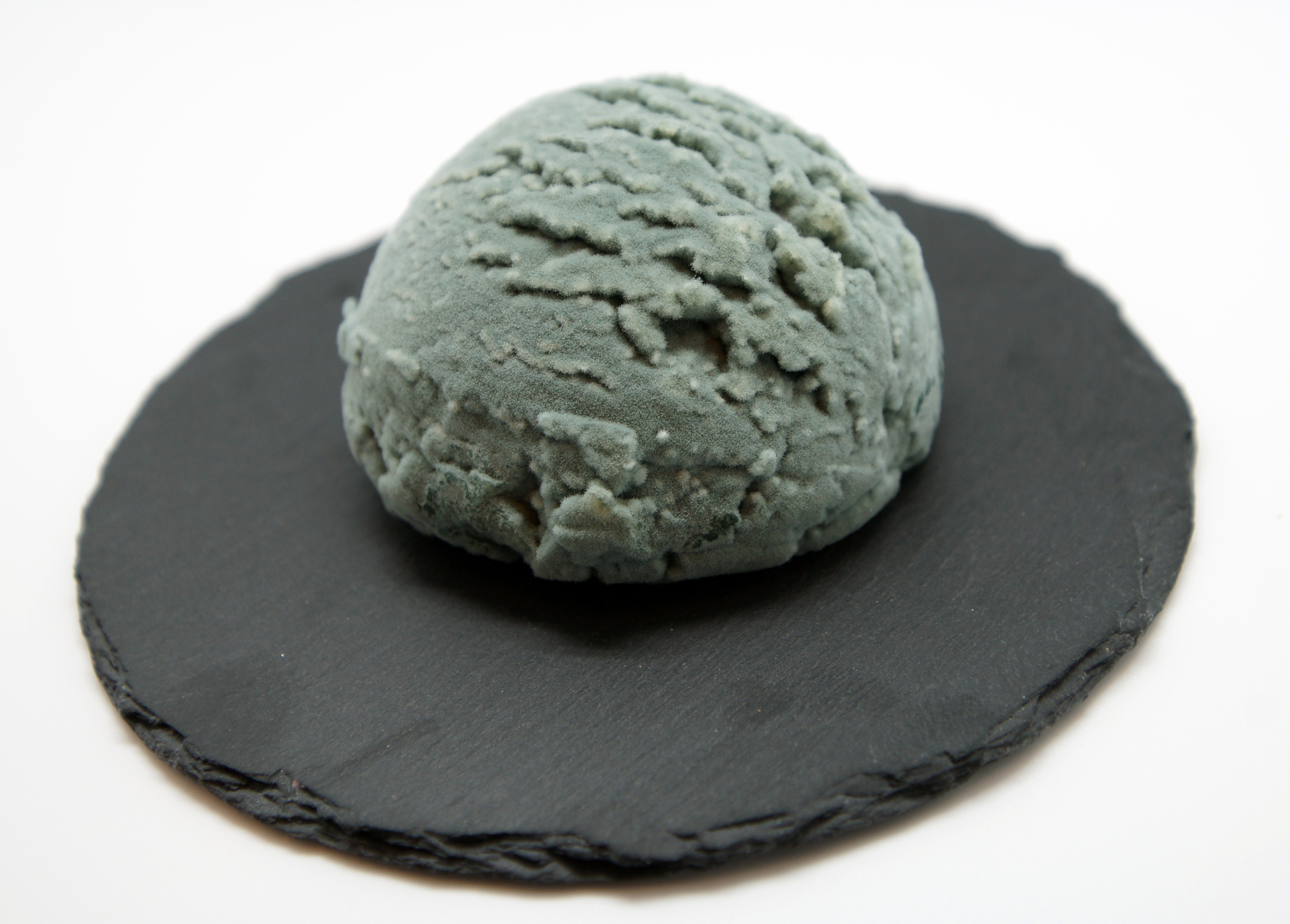
four weeks...

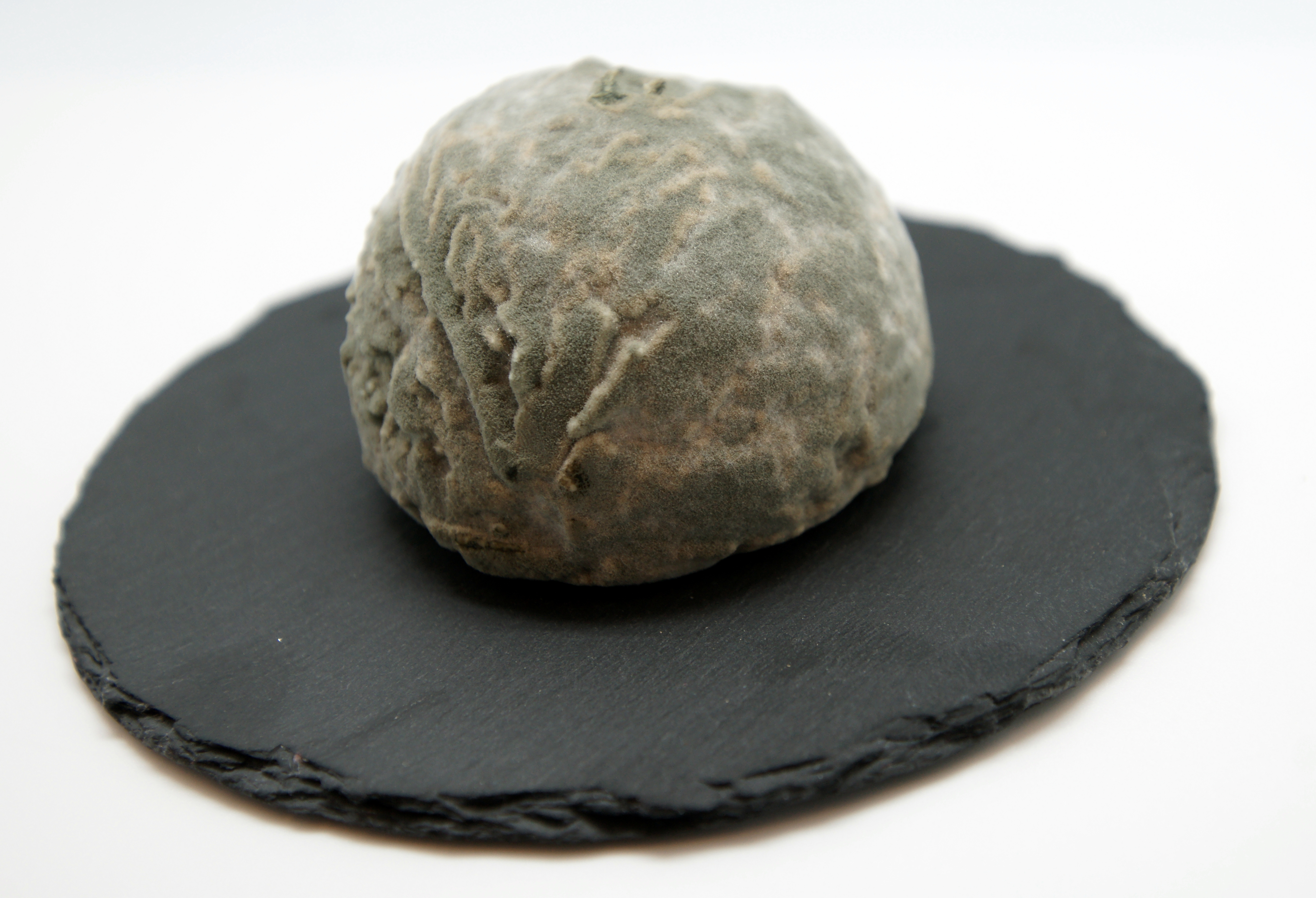
six weeks.
