= Toffen Castle =

Castle in Toffen in Bern, Switzerland

- Schloss Toffen
- Toffen
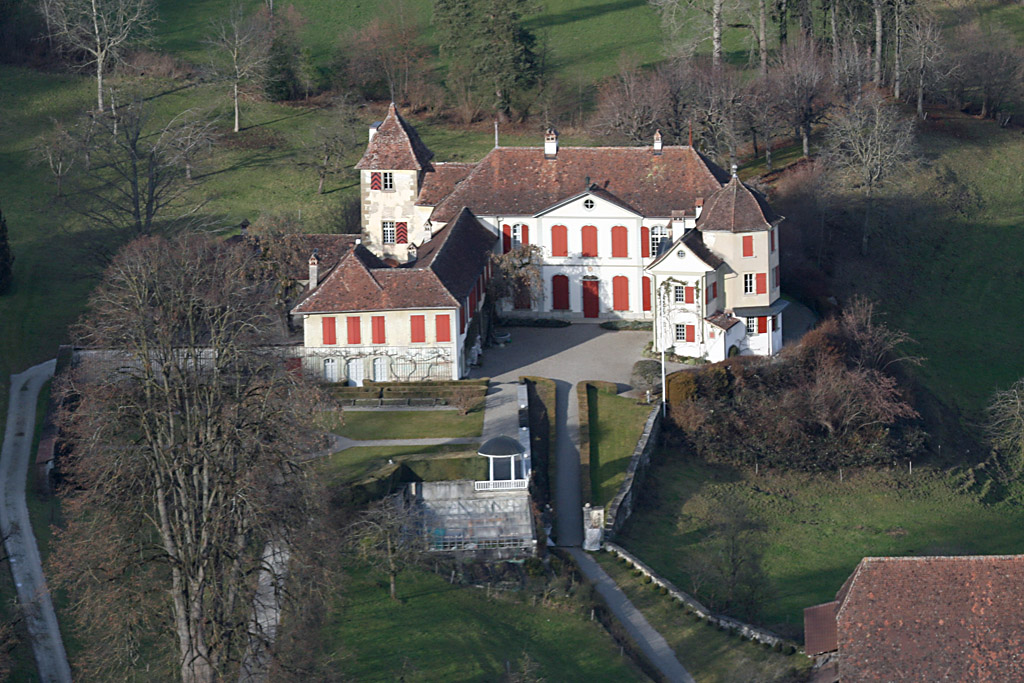
- Toffen Castle

Site information
- Type: Castle
- Owner: von May-von Werdt family
- Open to the public: no

Location
- Location within Switzerland
- Coordinates: 46.86338°N 7.48897°E

Site history
- Built: before 1306
- Built by: Johann von Bremgarten
- Materials: Stone

Toffen Castle (German: Schloss Toffen) is a Baroque country estate in Toffen, Canton of Bern, Switzerland. It is a Swiss heritage site of national significance.

== History ==
The construction date of Toffen Castle is unknown. It first appears in a record on 19 May 1306 when Johann von Bremgarten gave up his estates, which included Toffen and Bremgarten Castles, to his uncles Heinrich and Ulrich von Bremgarten. In 1323 Peter von Gysenstein, a patrician from Bern, acquired the castle and Zwing und Bann right over the villagers of Toffen. The castle was inherited, through his daughter, by Johann Senn von Münsingen. In 1352 Ulrich "Keseli" von Toffen, a local noble, bought part of the estate. Three years later, he bought the remainder. His family held the castle and surrounding estates for almost one hundred years.

After passing through several additional owners, in 1507 Bartholomew May (1446-1531) bought the estate. According to tradition, after the Battle of Novara, Bartholomew May brought the first bears to Bern's Bärengraben or Bear Pit. Bartholomew expanded and renovated the old castle into a late Gothic country manor house. The castle stayed in the von May family until 1610 when it was sold to Loys or Elogius Knobloch.

Knobloch brought in carpenters and artists from the Alsace region to renovate the castle interior. The Bretzelistube still contains the rich Renaissance style carvings as well as later paintings by the Bernese artist Joseph Werner. Loys Knobloch's daughter from his first marriage, Anna, married Abraham von Werdt in 1616. After the death of her father in 1642, von Werdt became the Freiherr over Toffen. The Toffen branch of the von Werdt family owned the castle for nine generations and today it is owned by Mrs. von May-von Werdt, who combines two family lines with extensive history at Toffen Castle.

In 1671-73 Johann Georg von Wendt rebuilt the entire castle into a Baroque manor. He removed an entire story from the main building and replaced the roof. The old curtain wall and gate house was demolished. An elegant garden replaced the old courtyard. A western wing was added to castle, with a great dining hall. He commissioned the popular Bernese landscape painter, Albrecht Kauw to paint four paintings that depicted the "Castle and Lands of Toffen" in each of the four cardinal directions. Around 1750 Georg Samuel von Werdt expanded and renovated the castle again.

Following the 1798 French invasion, and the creation of the Helvetic Republic the owners of the castle lost their medieval rights to rule over, judge and punish the villagers. However, they retained ownership of the castle and it remains in private hands today.

== See also ==
- List of castles in Switzerland
