= Abraham von Werdt =

Swiss politician (1594–1671)

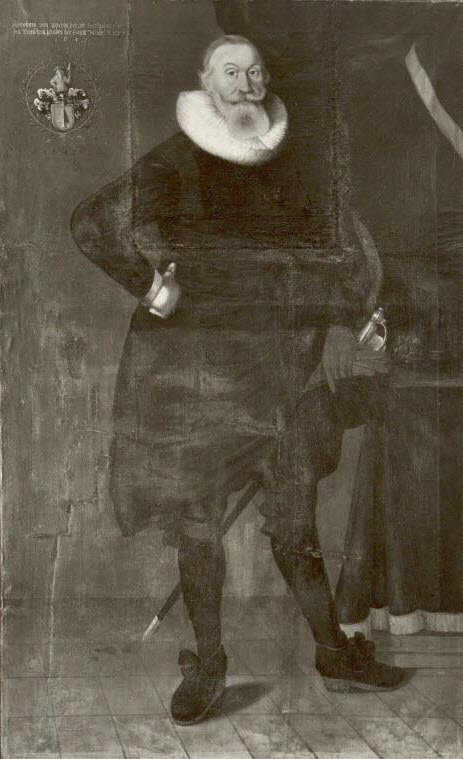
- Portrait, 1647
- Born: 7 February 1594; Bern, Switzerland
- Died: February 1671 (aged 76–77); Bern, Switzerland
- Occupation: Politician
- Spouses: Anna Knobloch (m. 1614) Barbara Lyoth (m. 1627) Elisabeth Andreae (m. 1629) Johanna von Ernau (m. 1636)
- Relatives: Emanuel von Graffenried (son-in-law)

Abraham von Werdt (7 February 1594 – February 1671) was a Bernese politician. He was a member of the Small Council of Bern from 1637, salt director, banneret (Venner), and treasurer of the German-speaking lands (Deutschseckelmeister). Through his first marriage he became lord of Toffen.

== Biography ==
Abraham von Werdt was a member of the Werdt family. He was the son of Lienhard, a bailiff (Landvogt), and Lucretia Tillier. He married four times: in 1614 Anna Knobloch, daughter of Ludwig; in 1627 Barbara Lyoth, daughter of Jakob; in 1629 Elisabeth Andreae, daughter of the pastor Tobias and widow of Gabriel von Luternau, a town hall official (Rathausammann); and in 1636 Johanna von Ernau, daughter of Hektor and widow of Rudolf von Hallwyl. His daughter Maria Magdalena married Emanuel von Graffenried in 1656.

From 1621 Werdt was a member of the Grand Council of Bern. He was excise collector (Ungelter von Burgern) in 1629–1630, bailiff (Vogt) of Aarwangen from 1630 to 1636, a member of the Small Council from 1637, and salt director (Salzdirektor) from 1637 to 1651. In 1644 he was elected Schultheiss of Thun, but from the day after his election until 1646 he was banneret (Venner) of the tanners' guild (zu Gerbern). He was treasurer of the German-speaking lands (Deutschseckelmeister) from 1646 to 1653 and from 1659 to 1666, and again banneret of the tanners' guild from 1667 to 1671. In the election of the Schultheiss (chief magistrate) of Bern in 1651 he lost to Anton von Graffenried (1597–1674). Through his first wife he became lord of Toffen.

== Bibliography ==
- S. Kirchberger, I. Steiger, Bernisches Staatsbuch, 6, 749 (manuscript, n.d., Burgerbibliothek Bern)
