= Emanuel von Graffenried =

Swiss politician (1636–1715)

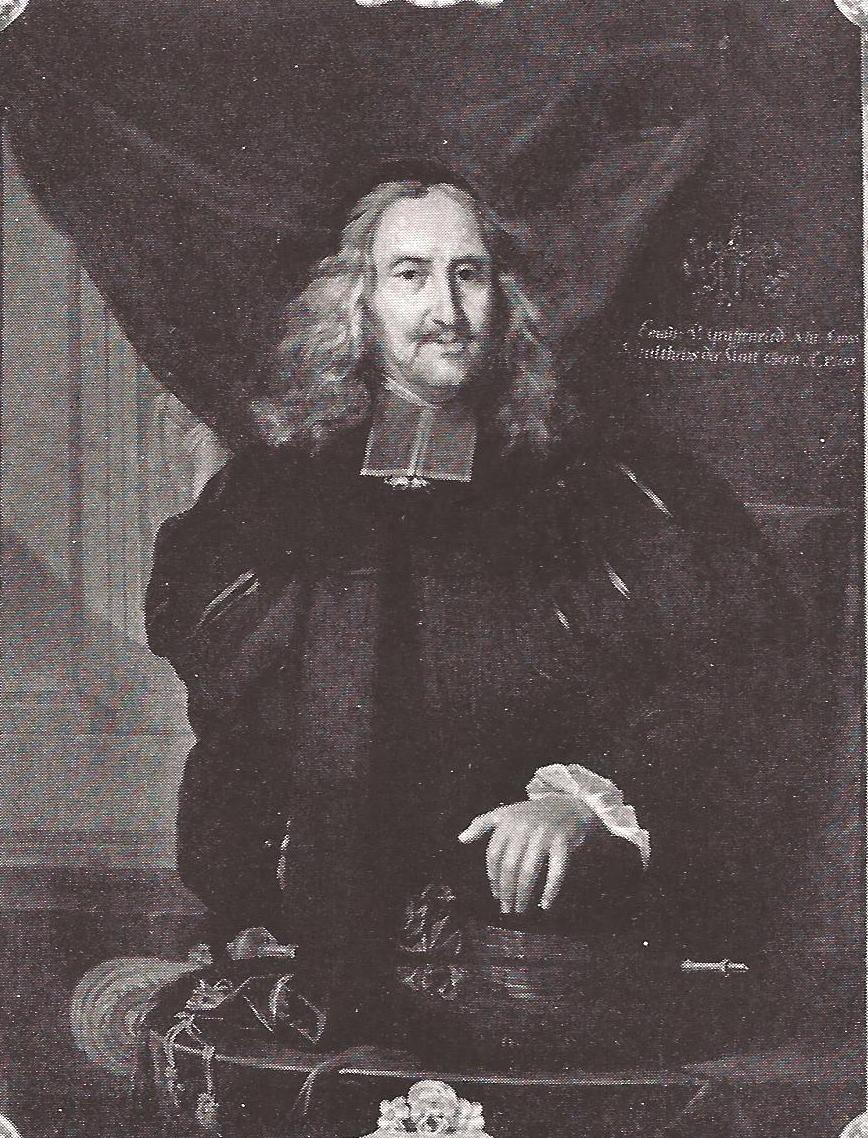
- Portrait by Johann Rudolf Huber, 1703
- Baptised: 8 December 1636; Bern, Switzerland
- Died: 5 April 1715
- Occupation: Politician
- Spouse: Maria Magdalena von Werdt (m. 1656)
- Children: Johann Anton von Graffenried
- Father: Anton von Graffenried
- Relatives: Anton von Graffenried (grandfather); Abraham von Werdt (father-in-law)

Emanuel von Graffenried (baptized 8 December 1636 – 5 April 1715) was a Bernese politician. He was bailiff of Lenzburg, a member of the Small Council, salt director, and banneret (Venner), and from 1700, like his father and grandfather before him, Schultheiss (chief magistrate) of Bern.

== Biography ==
Emanuel von Graffenried was a member of the Graffenried family. He was the son of Anton von Graffenried and the grandson of Anton von Graffenried. In 1656 he married Maria Magdalena von Werdt, daughter of Abraham von Werdt. He was the father of Johann Anton von Graffenried.

After spending several years in Heidelberg as a page to the Elector Palatine Charles Louis, Graffenried became a member of the Grand Council of Bern in 1664 and excise collector (Ohmgelter) in 1665. From 1669 to 1675 he was bailiff (Landvogt) of Lenzburg, from 1680 secret councilor (Heimlicher) and a member of the Small Council, from 1685 salt director (Salzdirektor), and from 1693 to 1697 banneret (Venner) of the bakers' guild (zu Pfistern). From 1700, like his father and grandfather before him, he was Schultheiss of Bern. He was a member of several federal embassies. He owned the Vaud vineyard estates of Bellerive and Vallamand. He died in 1715.

== Bibliography ==
- B. von Rodt, Genealogien burgerlicher Geschlechter der Stadt Bern, 2, 204 (manuscript, 1950, Burgerbibliothek Bern)
