= Johann Bernhard von Muralt =

Swiss politician and envoy (1634–1710)

- Portrait by Johann Rudolf Huber
- Baptised: 14 August 1634; Bern, Switzerland
- Died: 14 October 1710; Bern, Switzerland
- Occupations: Politician; envoy
- Spouse: Johanna Katharina Steiger (m. 1661)
- Relatives: Franz Ludwig von Muralt (brother); Johann Anton von Graffenried (son-in-law)

Johann Bernhard von Muralt (baptized 14 August 1634 – 14 October 1710) was a Bernese politician and envoy. He was a member of the Small Council of Bern, treasurer of the German-speaking lands (Deutschsäckelmeister), and banneret (Venner), and was often an envoy of Bern. In 1694 he bought the barony and castle of Belp.

== Biography ==
Johann Bernhard von Muralt was a member of the Muralt family. He was the son of Jost, a member of the Grand Council and bailiff (Landvogt), and Marie Schweizereisen, and the brother of Franz Ludwig von Muralt. In 1661 he married Johanna Katharina Steiger, of the "white" Steiger family, daughter of Georg, a member of the Small Council of Bern. His daughter Maria married Johann Anton von Graffenried in 1679.

In 1664 Muralt became a member of the Grand Council of Bern. He was chief usher (Grossweibel) in 1671, governor (Hofmeister) of Königsfelden from 1674 to 1680, a member of the Small Council from 1684, treasurer of the German-speaking lands (Deutschsäckelmeister) from 1693 to 1699, and banneret (Venner) of the tanners' guild (zu Gerbern) in 1709. In 1694 he bought the barony (Freiherrschaft) and castle of Belp from Daniel Stürler.

Muralt was often an envoy of Bern: in 1686 to Savoy concerning the Reformed Waldensians, several times between 1690 and 1709 to the Federal Diet (Tagsatzung) in Lucerne and Zurich, in 1703–1704 to Savoy and France, and in 1705 to the valley of Moutier (Münstertal) over encroachments by the bishop of Basel. In 1698 he spoke out against the harsh treatment of the Bernese Pietists. He died in Bern in 1710.

== Bibliography ==
- Sammlung Bernischer Biographien, 1, 1884, 387–393
- W. Maync, Bernische Wohnschlösser, 1979

=== Archives ===
- Diplomatic files, Burgerbibliothek Bern
