= Johann Anton von Graffenried =

Swiss politician (1658–1731)

- Baptised: 14 March 1658; Bern, Switzerland
- Died: 19 November 1731; Bern, Switzerland
- Occupation: Politician
- Spouses: Maria von Muralt (m. 1679) Maria Magdalena von Graffenried (m. 1693)
- Father: Emanuel von Graffenried
- Relatives: Samuel Morlot (son-in-law)

Johann Anton von Graffenried (baptized 14 March 1658 – 19 November 1731) was a Bernese politician. He was bailiff of Bipp, chief director of the salt works at Aigle, a member of the Small Council of Bern, twice banneret (Venner), and president of the Council of Commerce (Kommerzienrat).

== Biography ==
Johann Anton von Graffenried was a member of the Graffenried family. He was the son of Emanuel von Graffenried. In 1679 he married Maria von Muralt, daughter of Johann Bernhard von Muralt. In 1693 he married, secondly, Maria Magdalena von Graffenried, daughter of Johann, lord of Chevron (in the municipality of Aigle) and bailiff (Landvogt) of Chillon. His daughter Maria Magdalena married Samuel Morlot in 1700.

From 1680 Graffenried was a member of the Grand Council of Bern. In 1686 he was excise collector (Ohmgeldner), from 1690 to 1696 bailiff of Bipp, and in 1709 chief director of the salt works (Oberdirektor der Salzwerke) at Aigle. From 1715 he was secret councilor (Heimlicher) and a member of the Small Council, and between 1719 and 1731 he was twice banneret (Venner) of the bakers' guild (zu Pfistern). In 1725 he was an assessor on the Roche salt commission (Roche-Kommission) and president of the Council of Commerce (Kommerzienrat). He owned Bellerive and Vallamand. He died in Bern in 1731.

== Bibliography ==
- B. von Rodt, Genealogien burgerlicher Geschlechter der Stadt Bern, 2, 210 (manuscript, 1950, Burgerbibliothek Bern)
