= Oberried Estate =

Historic site in Belp, Switzerland

- Schloss Oberried (German)
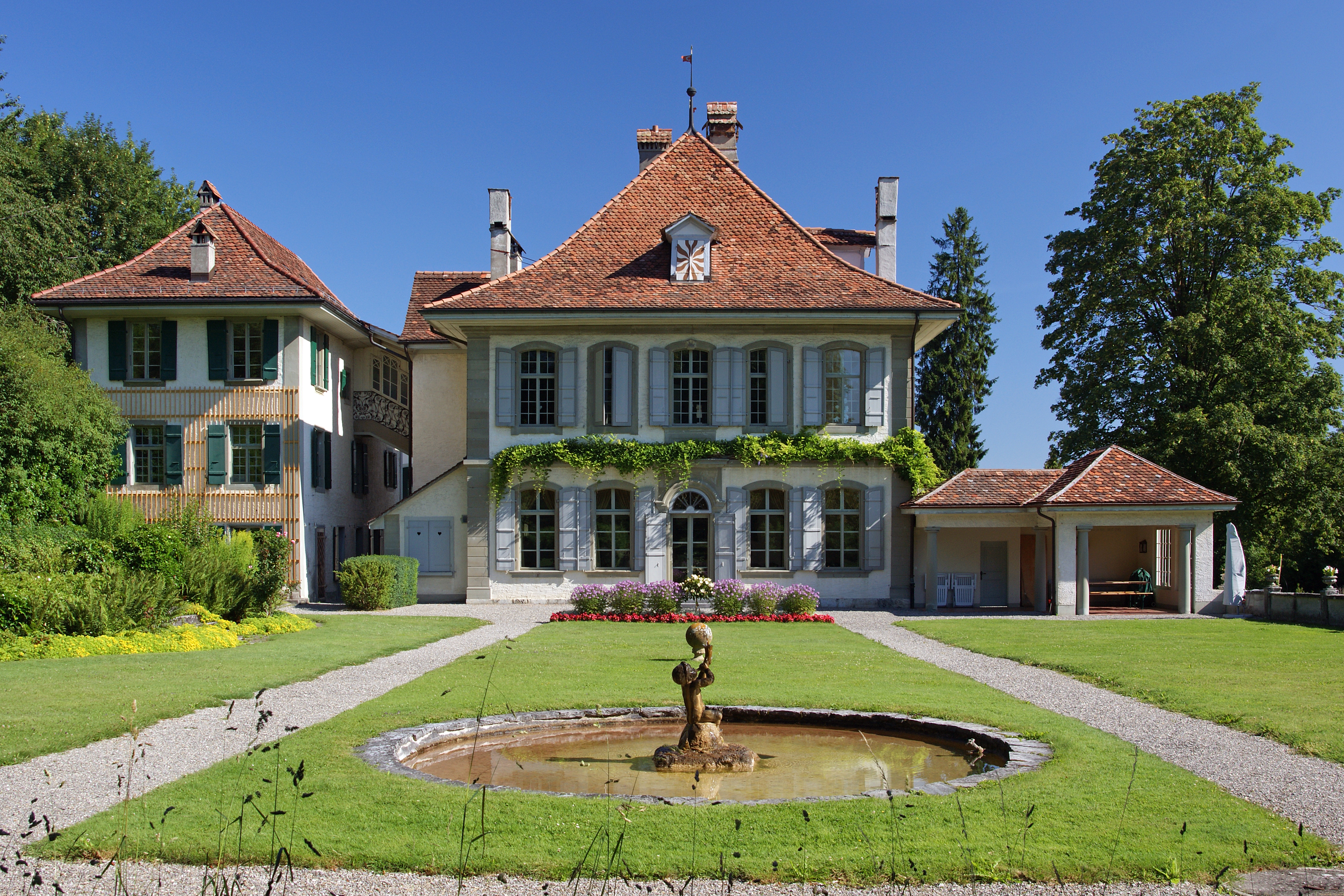
- Oberried Estate

- Location within Canton of Bern Location within Switzerland
- 46.888686°N 7.494615°E
- Location: Belp

History
- Built: 1735-6

Site notes
- Owner: The Familie von Fischer Foundation

Swiss Cultural Property of National Significance

Oberried Estate (German: Schloss Oberried or German: Campagne Oberried) is an estate in the municipality of Belp in the canton of Bern in Switzerland. It is a Swiss heritage site of national significance.

== History ==
Oberried was built in 1735-6 in the Rococo style for Victor von Fischer (1709-1750), a grandson of the founder of the Fischerpost postal service. The von Fischer (also von Reichenbach) family first appear in Bern in the 13th century. While they held many offices in the city, they only became truly wealthy after Beat Fischer founded his postal business. Victor's son, Gottlieb Fischer, expanded the estate, building a large ballroom and adding extensive gardens around the house. He added a Gloriette in the garden, the only one in the Canton of Bern. In 1853 the family sold the estate and it passed through numerous owners until the Familie von Fischer Foundation acquired it. In 2000-01 the building was renovated and now hosts cultural events such as concerts, readings, theater and dance recitals.

== See also ==
- List of castles in Switzerland
