= Niklaus Kirchberger =

Swiss politician (1591–1648)

- Baptised: 17 February 1591; Bern, Switzerland
- Died: 19 January 1648
- Occupation: Politician
- Spouse: Maria Güder (m. 1614)
- Relatives: Anton von Graffenried (brother-in-law)

Niklaus Kirchberger (baptized 17 February 1591 – 19 January 1648) was a Bernese politician. He was bailiff of Nidau and Lenzburg, a member of the Small Council of Bern, and several times a delegate to the Federal Diet. He succeeded his father as holder of the lordship of Bremgarten.

== Biography ==
Niklaus Kirchberger was a member of the Kirchberger family. He was the son of Niklaus, a banneret (Venner). In 1614 he married Maria Güder, daughter of Johann Anton, a bailiff (Landvogt). His sister Appollonia married Anton von Graffenried in 1648.

Kirchberger made a career in the service of the Bernese state. From 1619 he was a member of the Grand Council, from 1621 to 1624 chief usher (Grossweibel), from 1624 to 1630 bailiff of Nidau, from 1631 a member of the Small Council, from 1634 to 1640 bailiff of Lenzburg, and from 1646 to 1648 the council's superintendent of buildings (Bauherr). He represented Bern several times as a delegate to the Federal Diet (Tagsatzung). As his father's successor, he held the lordship of Bremgarten. He died in 1648.

== Bibliography ==
- B. von Rodt, Genealogien burgerlicher Geschlechter der Stadt Bern, 3, 160 (manuscript, 1950, Burgerbibliothek Bern)
