= Franz Ludwig von Muralt =

Swiss officer (1638–1684)

- Portrait, before 1684
- Baptised: 16 December 1638; Bern, Switzerland
- Died: 1684; Bern, Switzerland
- Occupation: Officer
- Spouse: Salome Stürler (m. 1662)
- Relatives: Johann Bernhard von Muralt (brother); Béat Louis de Muralt (son)

Franz Ludwig von Muralt (baptized 16 December 1638 – 1684) was a Bernese officer in Venetian and French service. In 1677–1678 he was a brigadier general for France in the war against Spain.

== Biography ==
Franz Ludwig von Muralt was a member of the Muralt family. He was the son of Jost, a member of the Grand Council and bailiff (Landvogt), and Marie Schweizereisen, and the brother of Johann Bernhard von Muralt. In 1662 he married Salome Stürler, daughter of Beat Ludwig, a member of the Bernese Small Council. He was the father of Béat Louis de Muralt.

In 1658–1659 Muralt was an officer in the service of Venice. From 1665 to 1668 he was captain of a Bernese free company (Freikompanie) in French service, and from 1671 he served in the Erlach regiment. In 1673 he became a member of the Grand Council of Bern, but in 1674 he was removed from it for taking part in the French campaign against the Netherlands; he was readmitted to the Grand Council in 1677. In 1677–1678 he was a brigadier general for France in the war against Spain.

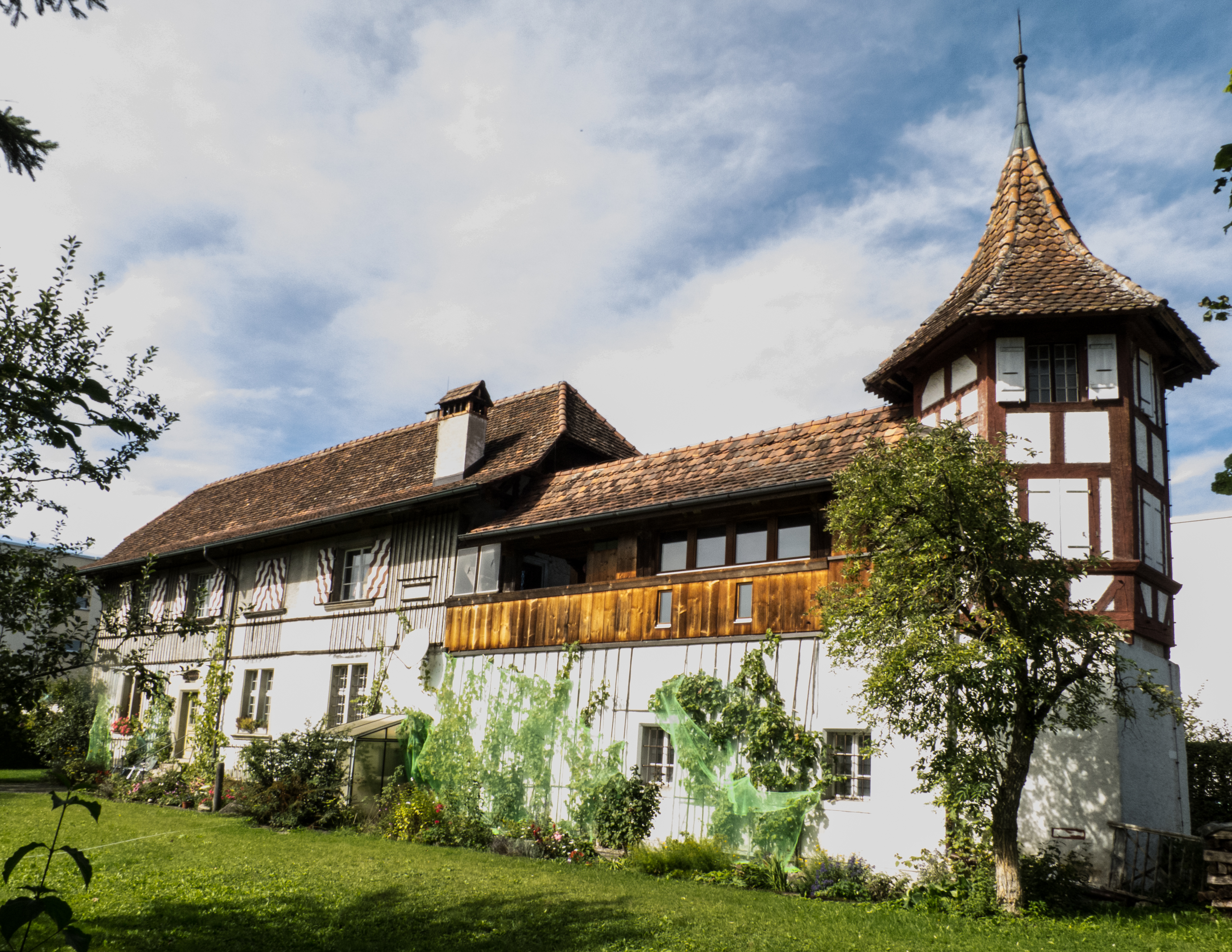
The Schlössli in Rüfenacht

In 1676 Muralt bought the Schlössli (small castle) of Rüfenacht, in the municipality of Worb. He died in Bern in 1684.

== Bibliography ==
- Sammlung bernischer Biographien, 1, 1884, 394
