= Paul Muralt =

Paul Muralt is a physicist working in materials science from the Swiss Federal Institute of Technology in Lausanne, Switzerland. He was named a Fellow of the Institute of Electrical and Electronics Engineers (IEEE) in 2013 for his contributions to piezoelectric microelectromechanical systems. He was born in 1954 in Zurich, Switzerland. He studied solid state physics at the Swiss Federal Institute of Technology in Zurich (ETH). He made a thesis at the same university on incommensurate phase transitions in a layered perovskite structure. He invented a method (scanning tunnelling potentiometry) to realise images of electrical surface potentials by means of scanning tunnelling microscopy at the IBM Research Laboratory Zurich. Later he specialised in thin film processing and applications of piezoelectric, pyroelectric, and ferroelectric thin films.
