= Béat Louis de Muralt =

Swiss soldier and writer

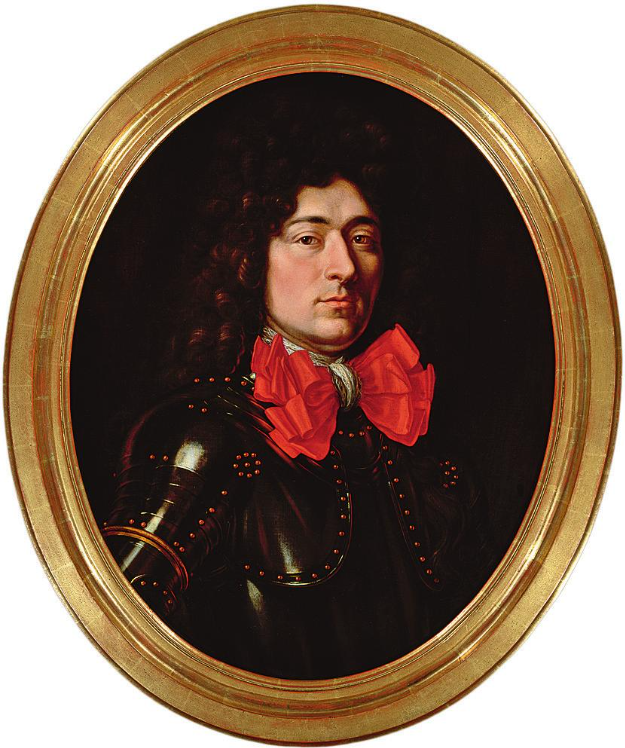
Portrait by Charles Le Brun, 1690

Beat Ludwig von Muralt, also known as Béat Louis de Muralt (baptized 9 January 1665 – 20 November 1749), was a Swiss military officer, author and travel writer, best known for his study of national characters.

== Biography ==
Muralt was baptized on 9 January 1665 in Bern, the son of Franz Ludwig von Muralt and Salome Stürler. His father was a Swiss mercenary in French service who later fought in the Franco-Dutch War, reaching the rank of brigadier general. He belonged to the Bernese branch of the noble Muralt family, which descended from Martino Muralto. Muralt began studying law and theology at the Academy of Geneva in 1681. He entered French service around 1690, as a captain of the Swiss Guards at the Palace of Versailles, and married Margarete von Wattenwyl, daughter of a member of the Grand Council of Bern, in 1699.

During his journeys to France, London, and the Netherlands in 1694–1695, Muralt wrote Lettres sur les sociétés française et anglaise ("Letters on the French and English societies"), which were published in revised form in Paris in 1725. From 1698 to 1701, he came into conflict with the Church in Bern as a Pietist and early Enlightenment thinker, which led him to continue his philosophical studies at his wife's estate in Colombier, Neuchâtel, from 1702 onwards. He died on 20 November 1749 in Colombier.

== Writings ==
Muralt's greatest work is Lettres sur les Anglois et les François et sur les voiages (1725), translated into English as Letters describing the Character and Customs of the English and French Nations (1726). In his Lettres, Muralt credited the liberal English with common sense (bon sens), while he considered the aestheticism (bel esprit) of the French aristocracy superficial. He advised his compatriots not to allow themselves to be "uninformed" by travel. According to him, the individual should take personal responsibility before divine providence and remain independent of ecclesiastical and aristocratic views.

Muralt's study of national characters was taken up by Pierre Carlet de Marivaux and Voltaire. Other notable Enlightenment figures, such as Jean-Jacques Rousseau, Albrecht von Haller, Johann Jakob Bodmer, Johann Christoph Gottsched, Johann Gottfried Herder, and Gotthold Ephraim Lessing, were influenced by his work. Muralt's later works, Lettres fanatiques (1739) and Fables nouvelles (1753), inspired by pietist mysticism, are much less known.

== List of works ==
- Lettres sur les Anglais et les Français (1725).
  - Lettres sur les Anglois et les François, ed. Charles Gould (Paris: H. Champion, 1933).
- L’instinct divin recommandé aux hommes (1727).
- Lettres sur les voyages et sur l’esprit-fort (1728).
- Lettres fanatiques (1739).
- Fables nouvelles (1753, posthumous).
