= Toffen =

- Municipality
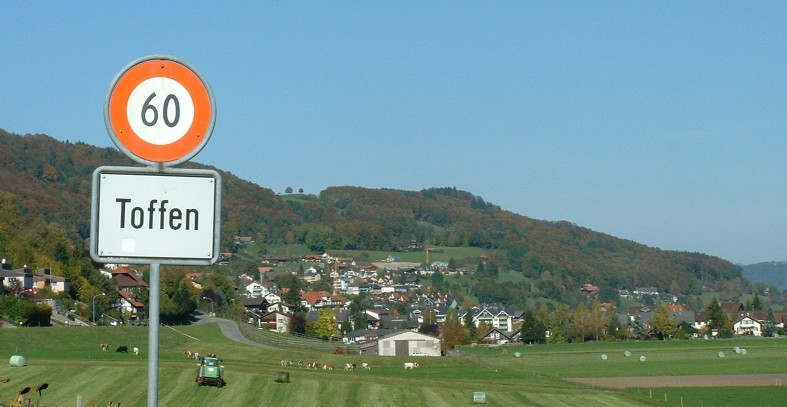

- Flag Coat of arms
- Location of Toffen
- Location within Switzerland Location within Canton of Bern
- Coordinates: 46°52′N 7°30′E
- Country: Switzerland
- Canton: Bern
- District: Bern-Mittelland

Government
  - Executive: Gemeinderat with 5 members
  - Mayor: Gemeindepräsident(in); Carl Bütler SVP/UDC (as of 2026)

Area
  - Total: 4.88 km^{2} (1.88 sq mi)
- Elevation: 527 m (1,729 ft)

Population (December 2020)
  - Total: 2,547
  - Density: 522/km^{2} (1,350/sq mi)
- Time zone: UTC+01:00 (CET)
  - Summer (DST): UTC+02:00 (CEST)
- Postal code: 3125
- SFOS number: 884
- ISO 3166 code: CH-BE
- Surrounded by: Belp, Belpberg, Gelterfingen, Kaufdorf, Niedermuhlern, Rüeggisberg, Wald
- Website: https://www.toffen.ch

Toffen is a municipality in the Bern-Mittelland administrative district in the canton of Bern in Switzerland. It lies approximately 10 km south of the city of Bern.

The palace situated there, Toffen Castle, is a heritage site of national significance.

== History ==
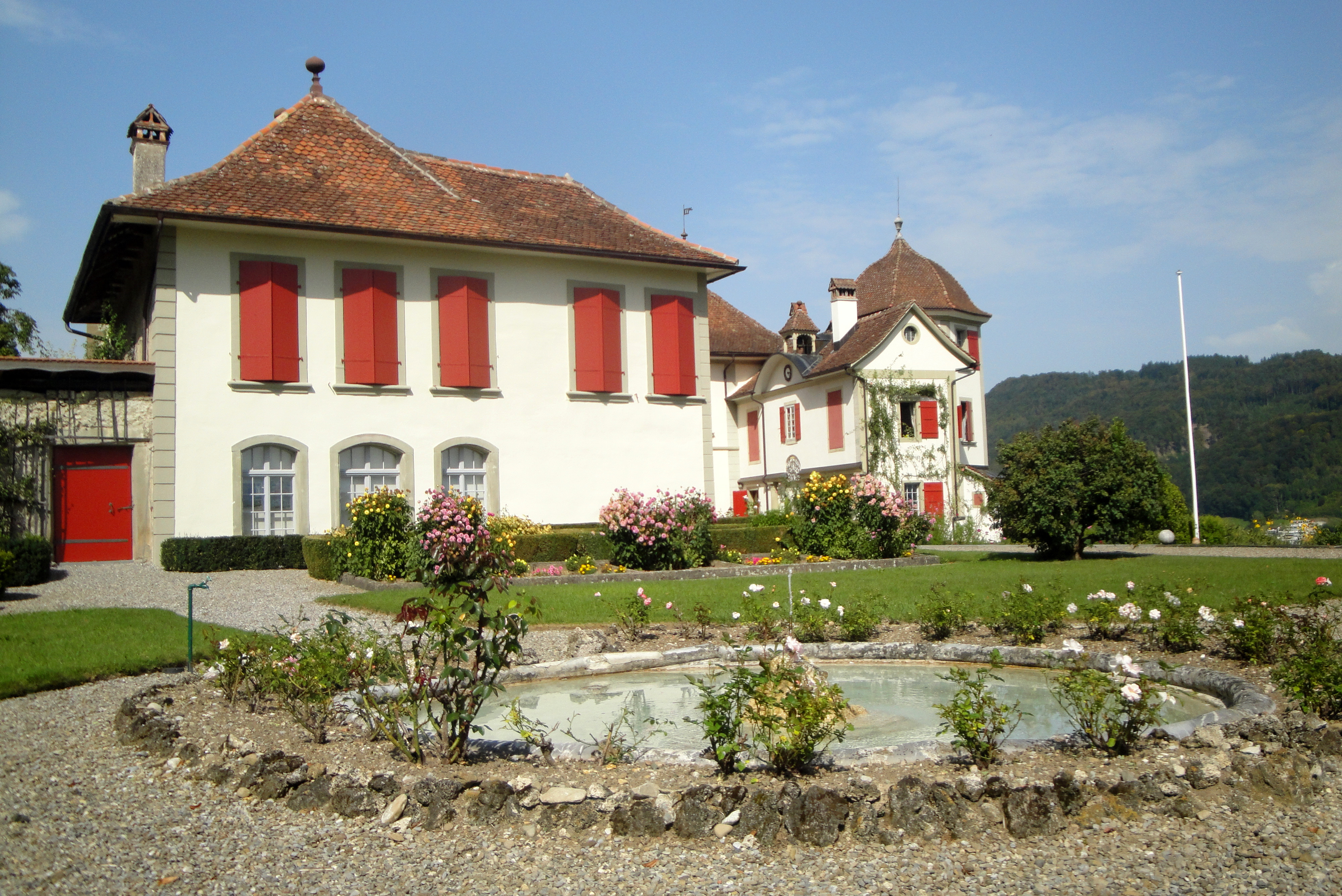
Toffen Castle

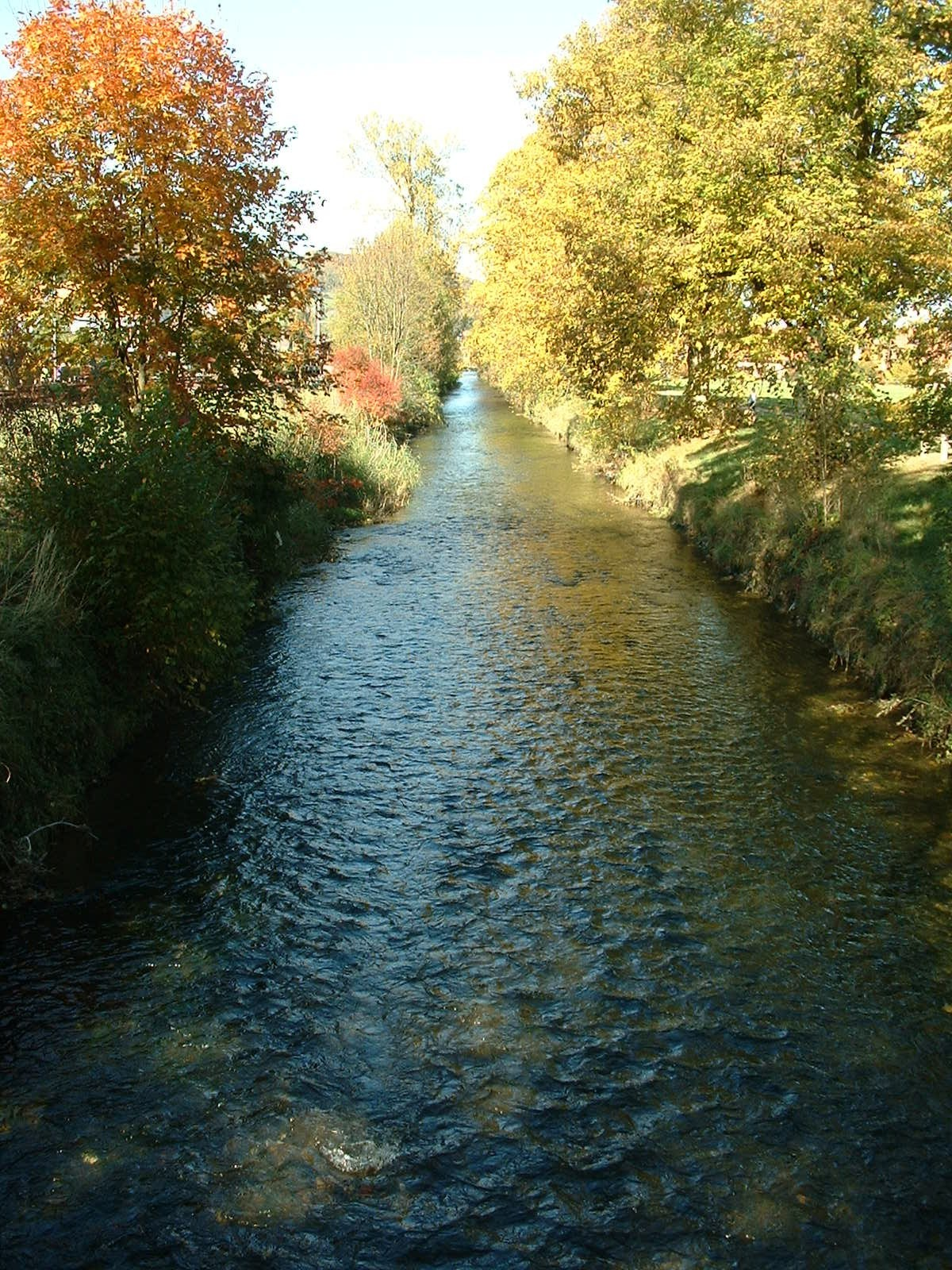
The Gürbe river in Toffen

Toffen is first mentioned in 1148 as Toffen.

The oldest trace of a settlement in the area is a Bronze Age grave which was discovered near the castle. During the Roman era there was a manor house near Bodenacker. In addition to the house, Roman coins and ceramics have been found around the municipality. The Romans also quarried Tuff stone from the area and the Latin word for Tuff, tofus probably becoming Toffen. By the 13th century it was part of the Herrschaft of the Freiherr von Belp-Montenach. Around 1300 the village was acquired by another noble family and for several centuries it was owned by a number of different noble families. By the mid-14th century Bern ruled over the village and the owners now included Bernese patrician families.

The castle was first mentioned in 1306 and was the center of the local Herrschaft. In 1507 Bartholomew May expanded and renovated it into a late Gothic country manor house. In 1628 Loy Knoblauch redesigned the entire interior. In 1671-73 Johann Georg renovated the castle into a Baroque manor. Around 1750 Georg Samuel von Werdt expanded and renovated the castle again. Following the 1798 French invasion, and the creation of the Helvetic Republic the owners of the castle lost their medieval rights to rule over, judge and punish the villagers. However, they retained ownership of the castle and it remained in private hands.

The Gürbe river correction projects of 1855 to 1911 drained the swampy valley floor and opened up additional farm and settlement land. The construction of the Gürbetal railroad in 1901 made it easier for residents to move to and from the municipality. In the 1960s, good road and rail links allowed it to grow into a bedroom community for the growing city of Bern. In the 1980s, Toffen became part of the Bern agglomeration. Today over 80% of the population commutes to jobs in Bern and surrounding communities. However, there is still a small farming and dairy industry in Toffen.

== Geography ==
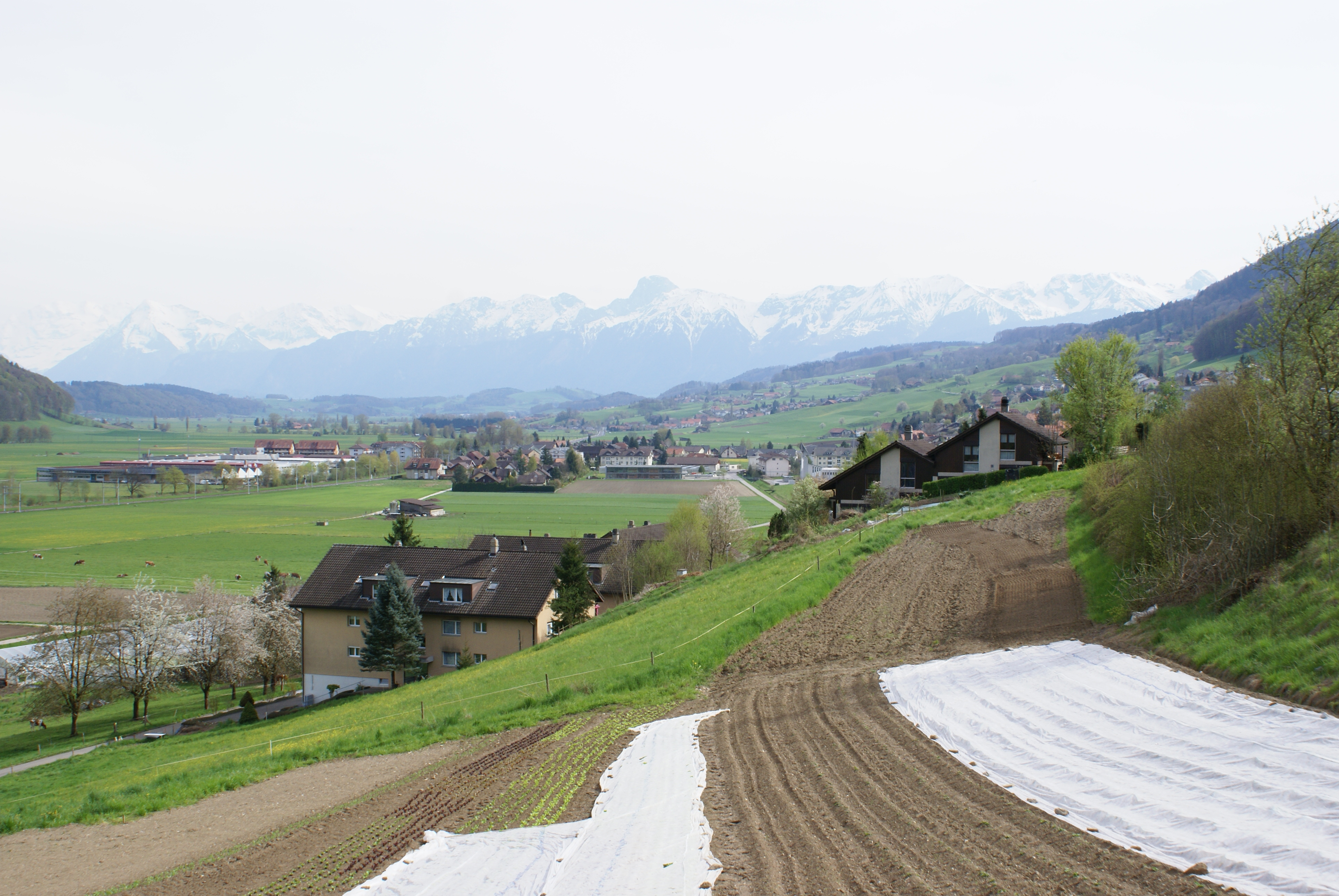
Toffen village, viewed from the north end.

Toffen has an area of 4.88 km^{2} (1.88 sq mi). As of 2012, a total of 3.06 km^{2} (1.18 mi^{2}) or 62.4% is used for agricultural purposes, while 0.95 km^{2} (0.37 mi^{2}) or 19.4% is forested. The rest of the municipality is 0.83 km^{2} (0.32 mi^{2}) or 16.9% is settled (buildings or roads), 0.02 km^{2} (4.9 acres) or 0.4% is either rivers or lakes.

During the same year, industrial buildings made up 1.6% of the total area while housing and buildings made up 8.4% and transportation infrastructure made up 6.3%. A total of 17.8% of the total land area is heavily forested and 1.6% is covered with orchards or small clusters of trees. Of the agricultural land, 38.4% is used for growing crops and 22.2% is pasturage, while 1.8% is used for orchards or vine crops. All the water in the municipality is flowing water.

The municipality is located in the Gürbetal and stretches from the eastern slope of the Längenberg to the foot of the Belpberg. It consists of the village of Toffen and the hamlets of Breitloon and Heitere.

On 31 December 2009 Amtsbezirk Seftigen, the municipality's former district, was dissolved. On the following day, 1 January 2010, it joined the newly created Verwaltungskreis Bern-Mittelland.

== Coat of arms ==
The blazon of the municipal coat of arms is Gules a Swan passant Argent beaked and membered Or.

== Demographics ==
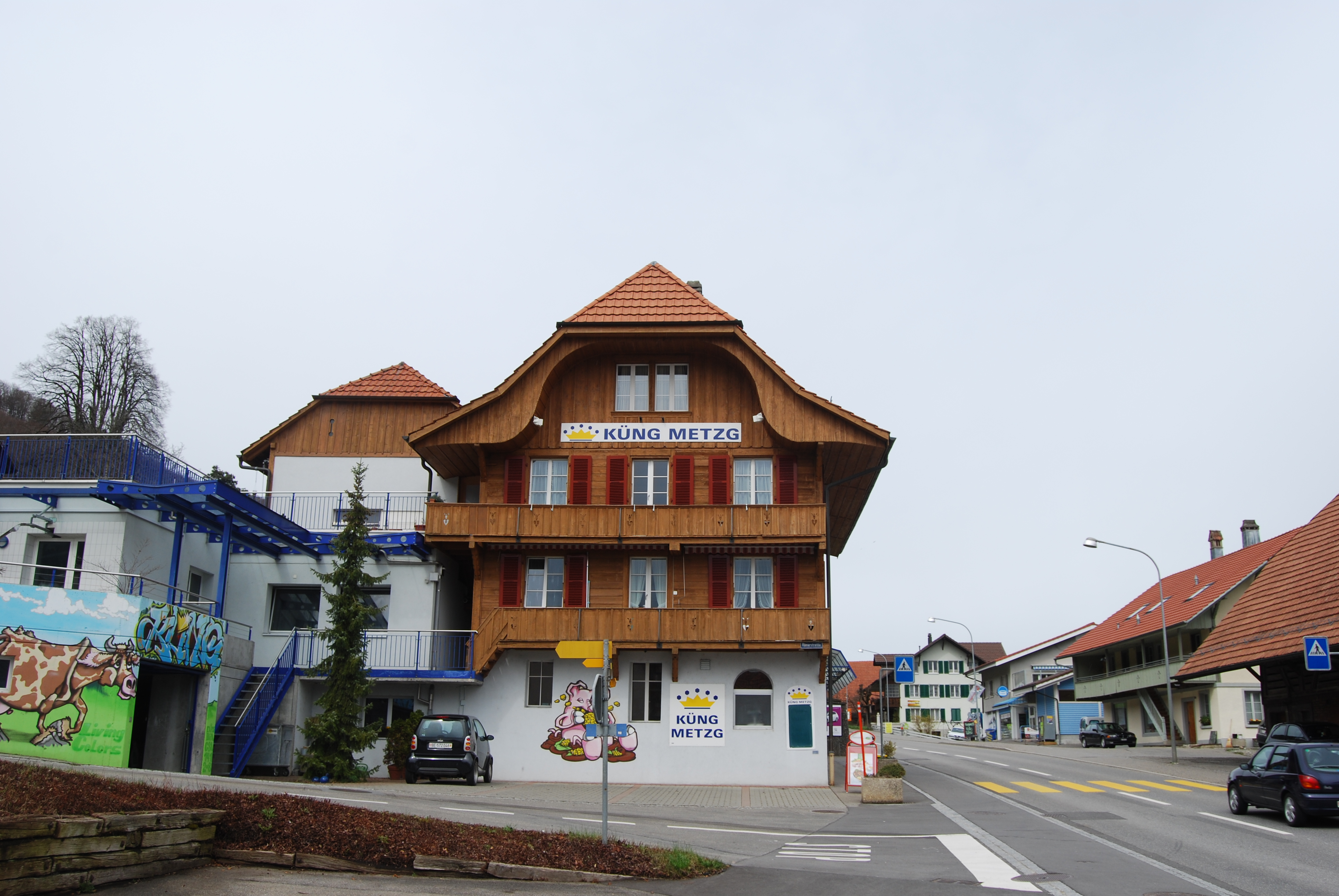
Toffen

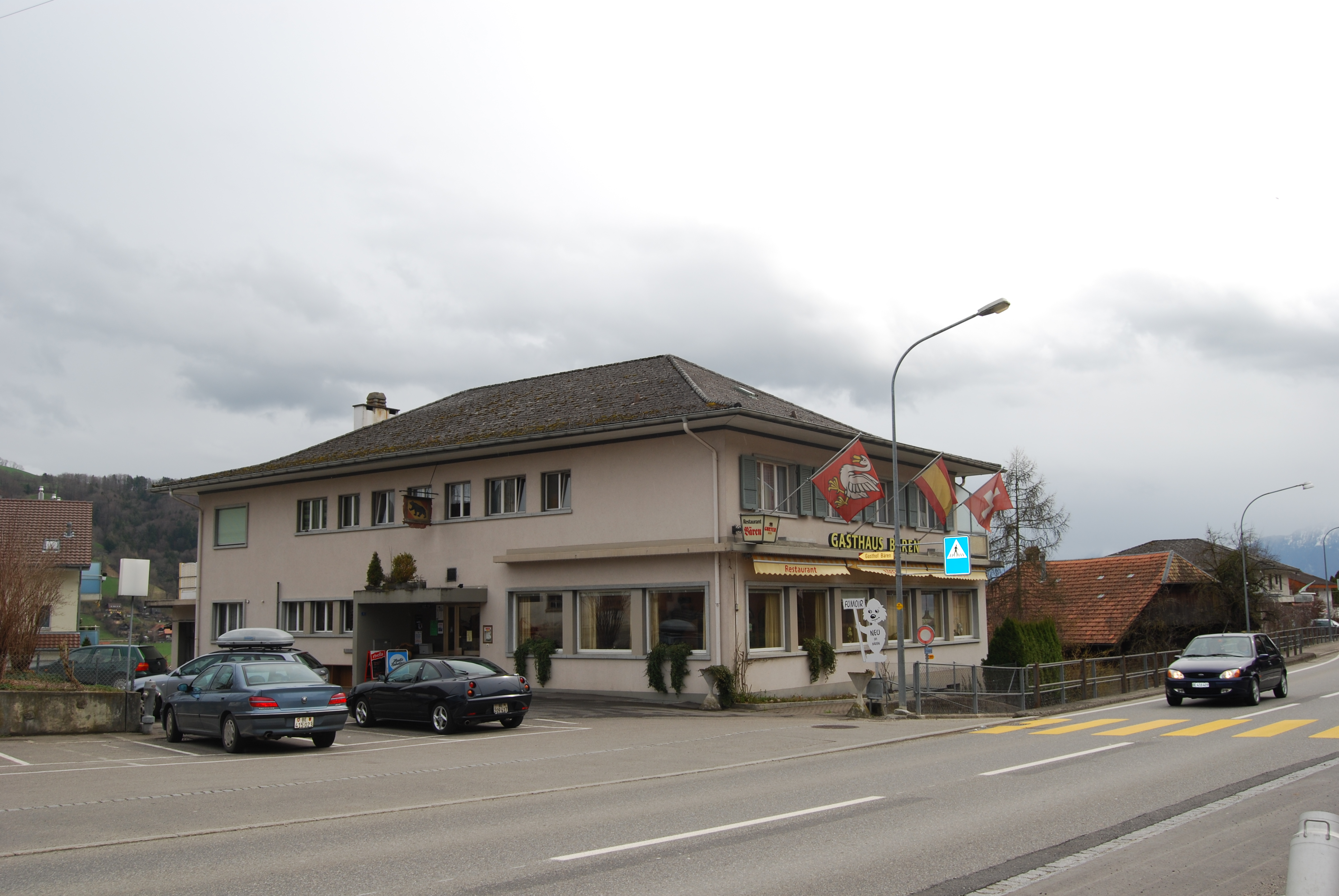
Gasthaus Bären in Toffen

Toffen has a population (as of December 2020) of 2,547. As of 2012, 8.3% of the population are resident foreign nationals. Over the last 2 years (2010-2012) the population has changed at a rate of 2.0%. Migration accounted for 1.5%, while births and deaths accounted for 0.2%.

Most of the population (as of 2000) speaks German (2,112 or 95.0%) as their first language, French is the second most common (28 or 1.3%) and Albanian is the third (18 or 0.8%). There are 11 people who speak Italian and 5 people who speak Romansh.

As of 2008, the population was 48.5% male and 51.5% female. The population was made up of 1,075 Swiss men (43.9% of the population) and 113 (4.6%) non-Swiss men. There were 1,176 Swiss women (48.0%) and 86 (3.5%) non-Swiss women. Of the population in the municipality, 509 or about 22.9% were born in Toffen and lived there in 2000. There were 1,182 or 53.2% who were born in the same canton, while 289 or 13.0% were born somewhere else in Switzerland, and 182 or 8.2% were born outside of Switzerland.

As of 2012, children and teenagers (0–19 years old) make up 20.0% of the population, while adults (20–64 years old) make up 61.6% and seniors (over 64 years old) make up 18.3%.

As of 2000, there were 900 people who were single and never married in the municipality. There were 1,139 married individuals, 89 widows or widowers and 95 individuals who are divorced.

As of 2010, there were 282 households that consist of only one person and 50 households with five or more people. In 2000, a total of 888 apartments (93.2% of the total) were permanently occupied, while 41 apartments (4.3%) were seasonally occupied and 24 apartments (2.5%) were empty. As of 2012, the construction rate of new housing units was 6.8 new units per 1000 residents. The vacancy rate for the municipality, in 2013, was 1.4%. In 2011, single family homes made up 62.2% of the total housing in the municipality.

The historical population is given in the following chart:

== Heritage sites of national significance ==
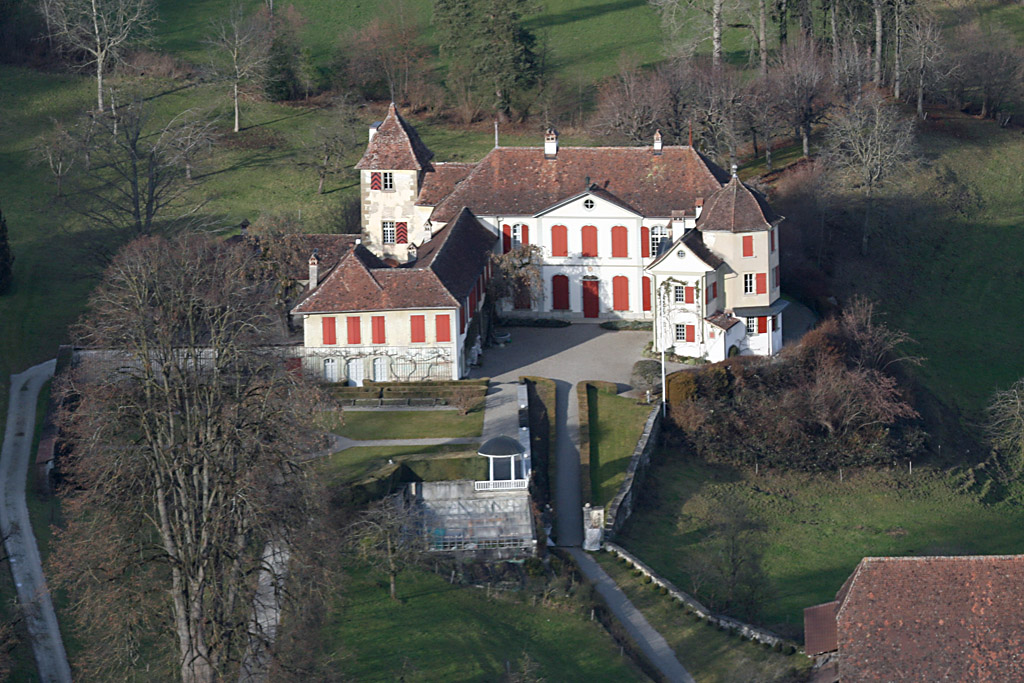
Toffen Castle

Toffen Castle is listed as a Swiss heritage site of national significance.

== Politics ==
In the 2011 federal election the most popular party was the Swiss People's Party (SVP) which received 30.9% of the vote. The next three most popular parties were the Conservative Democratic Party (BDP) (22.0%), the Social Democratic Party (SP) (15.9%) and the Green Party (6.9%). In the federal election, a total of 998 votes were cast, and the voter turnout was 54.4%.

== Economy ==
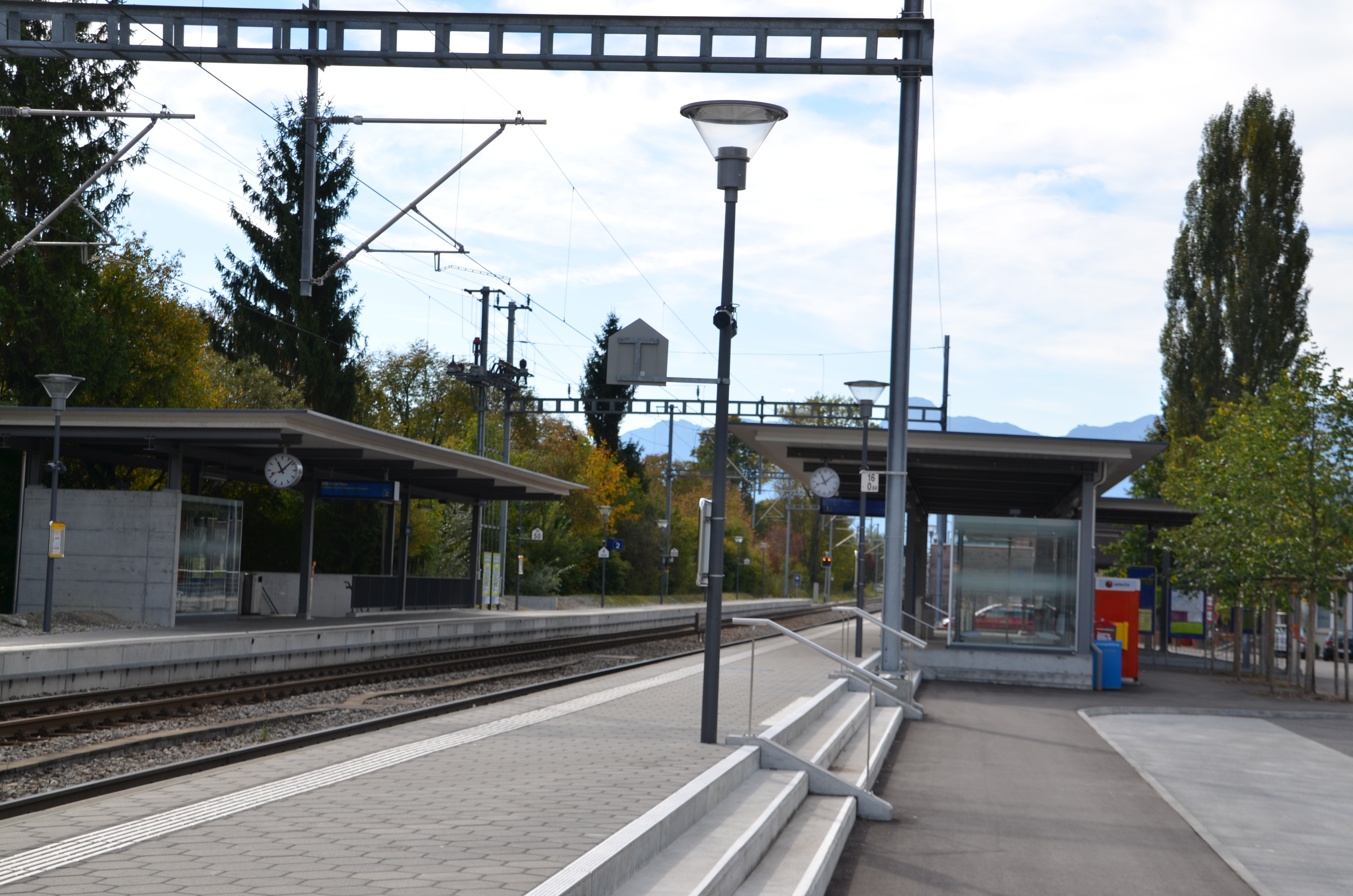
Toffen railway station

As of 2011, Toffen had an unemployment rate of 1.83%. As of 2011, there were a total of 568 people employed in the municipality. Of these, there were 54 people employed in the primary economic sector and about 18 businesses involved in this sector. 111 people were employed in the secondary sector and there were 24 businesses in this sector. 403 people were employed in the tertiary sector, with 98 businesses in this sector. There were 1,251 residents of the municipality who were employed in some capacity, of which females made up 42.8% of the workforce.

In 2008 there were a total of 444 full-time equivalent jobs. The number of jobs in the primary sector was 31, all of which were in agriculture. The number of jobs in the secondary sector was 109 of which 22 or (20.2%) were in manufacturing and 87 (79.8%) were in construction. The number of jobs in the tertiary sector was 304. In the tertiary sector; 204 or 67.1% were in wholesale or retail sales or the repair of motor vehicles, 8 or 2.6% were in the movement and storage of goods, 11 or 3.6% were in a hotel or restaurant, 20 or 6.6% were technical professionals or scientists, 18 or 5.9% were in education and 10 or 3.3% were in health care.

In 2000, there were 292 workers who commuted into the municipality and 997 workers who commuted away. The municipality is a net exporter of workers, with about 3.4 workers leaving the municipality for every one entering. A total of 254 workers (46.5% of the 546 total workers in the municipality) both lived and worked in Toffen. Of the working population, 29.3% used public transportation to get to work, and 52.7% used a private car.

In 2011 the average local and cantonal tax rate on a married resident, with two children, of Toffen making 150,000 CHF was 12.4%, while an unmarried resident's rate was 18.2%. For comparison, the average rate for the entire canton in the same year, was 14.2% and 22.0%, while the nationwide average was 12.3% and 21.1% respectively.

In 2009 there were a total of 1,113 tax payers in the municipality. Of that total, 459 made over 75,000 CHF per year. There were 6 people who made between 15,000 and 20,000 per year. The average income of the over 75,000 CHF group in Toffen was 116,652 CHF, while the average across all of Switzerland was 130,478 CHF.

In 2011 a total of 1.6% of the population received direct financial assistance from the government.

== Religion ==
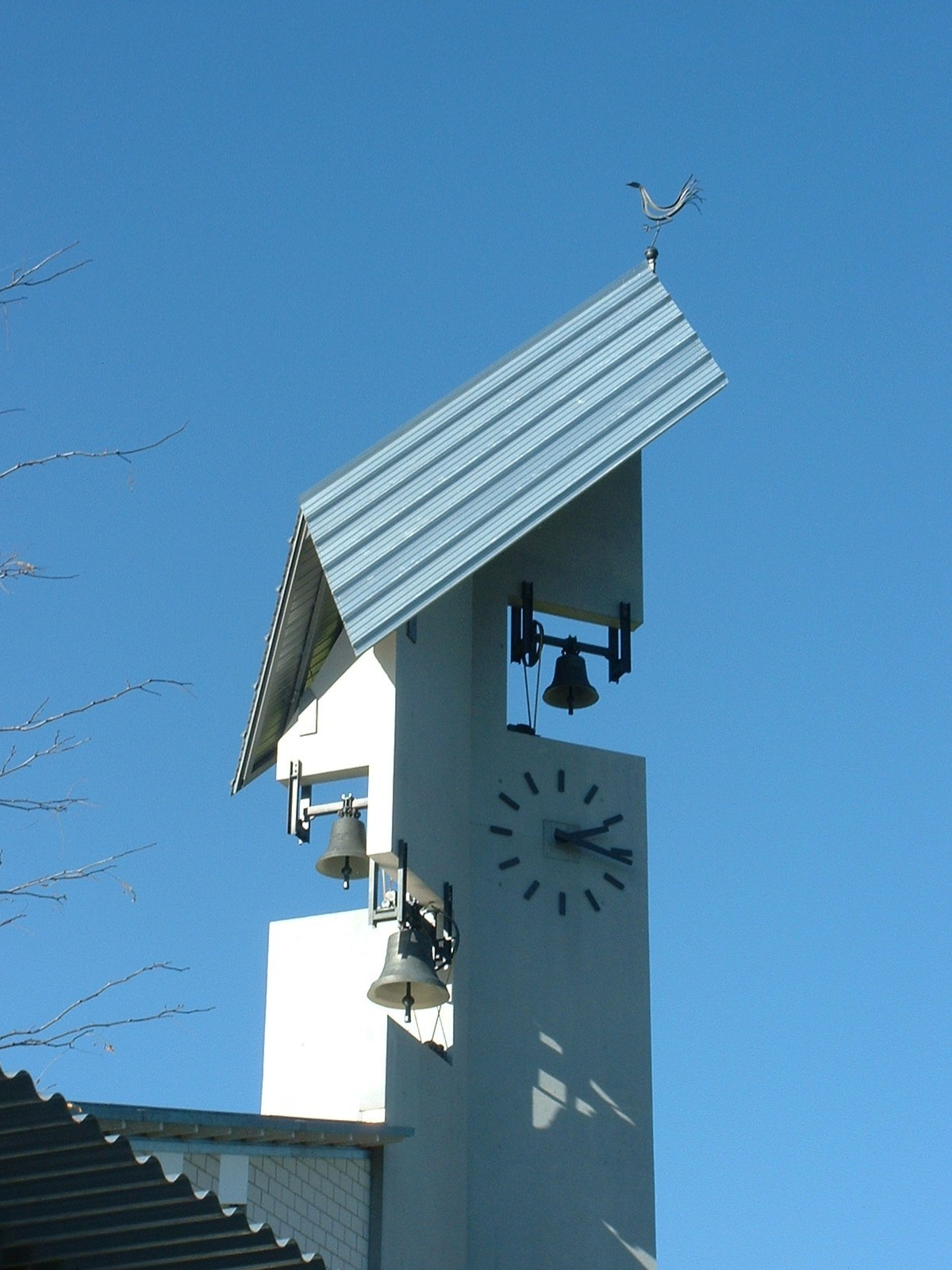
Toffen Swiss Reformed church bell tower

From the 2000 census, 1,675 or 75.3% belonged to the Swiss Reformed Church, while 224 or 10.1% were Roman Catholic. Of the rest of the population, there were 19 members of an Orthodox church (or about 0.85% of the population), and there were 68 individuals (or about 3.06% of the population) who belonged to another Christian church. There were 28 (or about 1.26% of the population) who were Muslim. There were 6 individuals who were Buddhist, 2 individuals who were Hindu and 2 individuals who belonged to another church. 134 (or about 6.03% of the population) belonged to no church, are agnostic or atheist, and 65 individuals (or about 2.92% of the population) did not answer the question.

== Education ==
In Toffen about 59.8% of the population have completed non-mandatory upper secondary education, and 19.9% have completed additional higher education (either university or a Fachhochschule). Of the 282 who had completed some form of tertiary schooling listed in the census, 72.0% were Swiss men, 23.4% were Swiss women, 3.2% were non-Swiss men.

The Canton of Bern school system provides one year of non-obligatory Kindergarten, followed by six years of Primary school. This is followed by three years of obligatory lower Secondary school where the students are separated according to ability and aptitude. Following the lower Secondary students may attend additional schooling or they may enter an apprenticeship.

During the 2011-12 school year, there were a total of 222 students attending classes in Toffen. There were 2 kindergarten classes with a total of 35 students in the municipality. Of the kindergarten students, 17.1% were permanent or temporary residents of Switzerland (not citizens) and 17.1% have a different mother language than the classroom language. The municipality had 8 primary classes and 151 students. Of the primary students, 7.3% were permanent or temporary residents of Switzerland (not citizens) and 7.9% have a different mother language than the classroom language. During the same year, there were 2 lower secondary classes with a total of 36 students. There were 2.8% who were permanent or temporary residents of Switzerland (not citizens) and 11.1% have a different mother language than the classroom language.

As of 2000, there were a total of 207 students attending any school in the municipality. Of those, 193 both lived and attended school in the municipality, while 14 students came from another municipality. During the same year, 108 residents attended schools outside the municipality.
