= Anton von Graffenried (died 1674) =

Swiss politician (1597–1674)

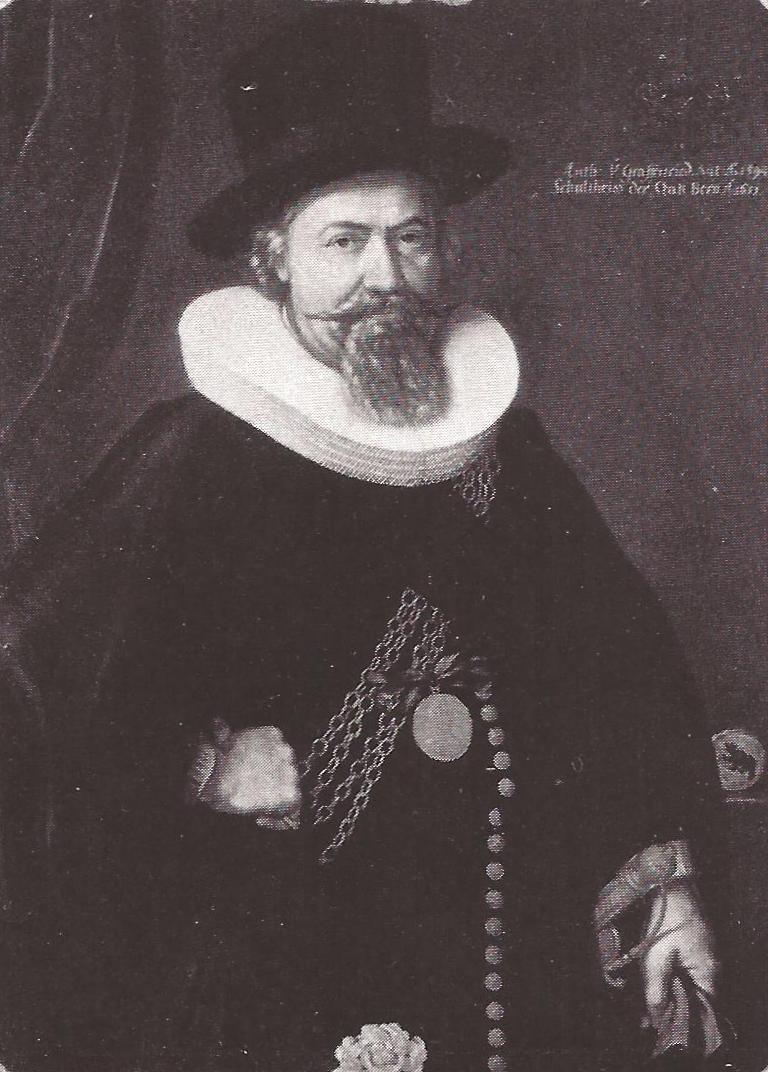
- Baptised: 21 July 1597; Bern, Switzerland
- Died: 20 April 1674; Bern, Switzerland
- Occupation: Politician
- Spouses: Ursula Dumoulin (m. 1619) Marguerite de Blonay (m. 1640) Appollonia Kirchberger (m. 1648) Johanna von Ernauw (m. 1671)
- Children: Emanuel von Graffenried
- Father: Anton von Graffenried

Anton von Graffenried (baptized 21 July 1597 – 20 April 1674) was a Bernese politician. He was bailiff of Grandson, a member of the Small Council, three times banneret (Venner), and from 1651 Schultheiss (chief magistrate) of Bern. In 1663 he was Bern's envoy in Paris at the renewal of the mercenary alliance between Louis XIV and the Swiss cantons.

== Biography ==
Anton von Graffenried was a member of the Graffenried family. He was the son of Anton von Graffenried. In 1619 he married Ursula Dumoulin, a widow and daughter of François, lord of Montagny. He married, secondly, in 1640, Marguerite de Blonay, a widow; thirdly, in 1648, Appollonia Kirchberger, a widow, daughter of Niklaus, a banneret and lord of Bremgarten, and sister of Niklaus Kirchberger; and fourthly, in 1671, Johanna von Ernauw, also a widow. Through his first wife he became the holder of the Vaud lordships of Carrouge and Corcelles and co-lord of Mézières. He was the father of Emanuel von Graffenried.

In his home city Graffenried had a rapid political rise. He became a member of the Grand Council in 1621, was bailiff (Landvogt) of Grandson from 1625 to 1630, and became secret councilor (Heimlicher) and a member of the Small Council in 1631. Between 1633 and 1651 he was three times banneret (Venner) of the bakers' guild (zu Pfistern), and in 1651 he became salt director (Salzdirektor) and Schultheiss. In 1663 he was Bern's envoy in Paris at the renewal of the mercenary alliance (Soldallianz) between King Louis XIV of France and the Swiss cantons. He died in Bern in 1674.

== Bibliography ==
- B. von Rodt, Genealogien burgerlicher Geschlechter der Stadt Bern, 2, 200 (manuscript, 1950, Burgerbibliothek Bern)
