= Anton von Graffenried (died 1628) =

Swiss politician (1573–1628)

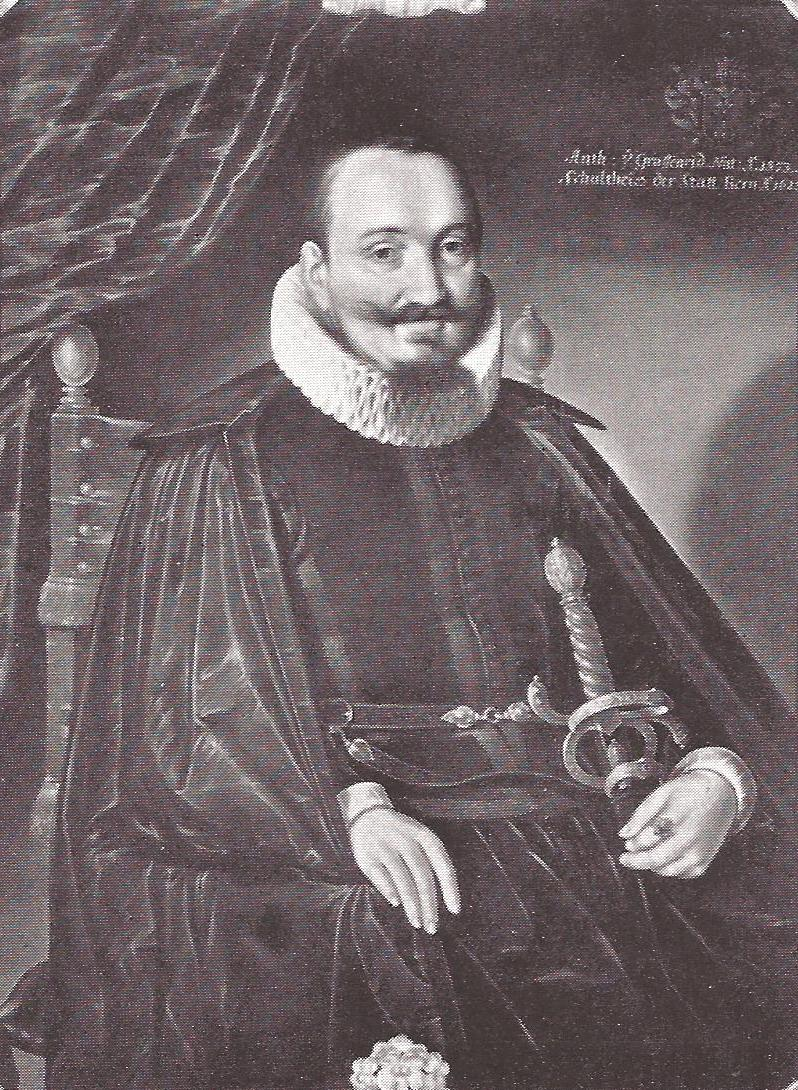
- Baptised: 30 August 1573; Aarwangen, Switzerland
- Died: August 1628
- Occupation: Politician
- Spouse: Barbara Elisabeth Zehender (m. 1596)
- Children: Anton von Graffenried
- Relatives: Marquard Zehender (father-in-law)

Anton von Graffenried (baptized 30 August 1573 – August 1628) was a Bernese politician. He was castellan of Saanen, a member of the Small Council, treasurer of the German-speaking lands (Deutschseckelmeister), and from 1623 Schultheiss (chief magistrate) of Bern. In 1614 and 1618 he acted as a mediator in the conflicts in the Grisons and Neuchâtel.

== Biography ==
Anton von Graffenried was a member of the Graffenried family. He was the son of Anton, a banneret (Venner). In 1596 he married Barbara Elisabeth Zehender, daughter of Marquart, bailiff (Landvogt) of Nyon and Aigle. His son Anton was also Schultheiss of Bern.

From 1599 Graffenried was a member of the Grand Council of Bern, from 1605 to 1611 castellan (Kastlan) of Saanen, and from 1611 a member of the Small Council. In 1613 he was banneret (Venner) of the bakers' guild (zu Pfistern), from 1614 to 1623 treasurer of the German-speaking lands (Deutschseckelmeister), and from 1623 Schultheiss of Bern. In 1614 and 1618 he acted as a mediator in the conflicts in the Grisons and Neuchâtel, and in 1618 he swore the mercenary alliance (Soldbündnis) of the Republic of Venice with Bern and Zurich. He was lord of Muhleren. He died in 1628.

== Bibliography ==
- B. von Rodt, Genealogien burgerlicher Geschlechter der Stadt Bern, 2, 196 (manuscript, 1950, Burgerbibliothek Bern)
