= Belp =

- Municipality
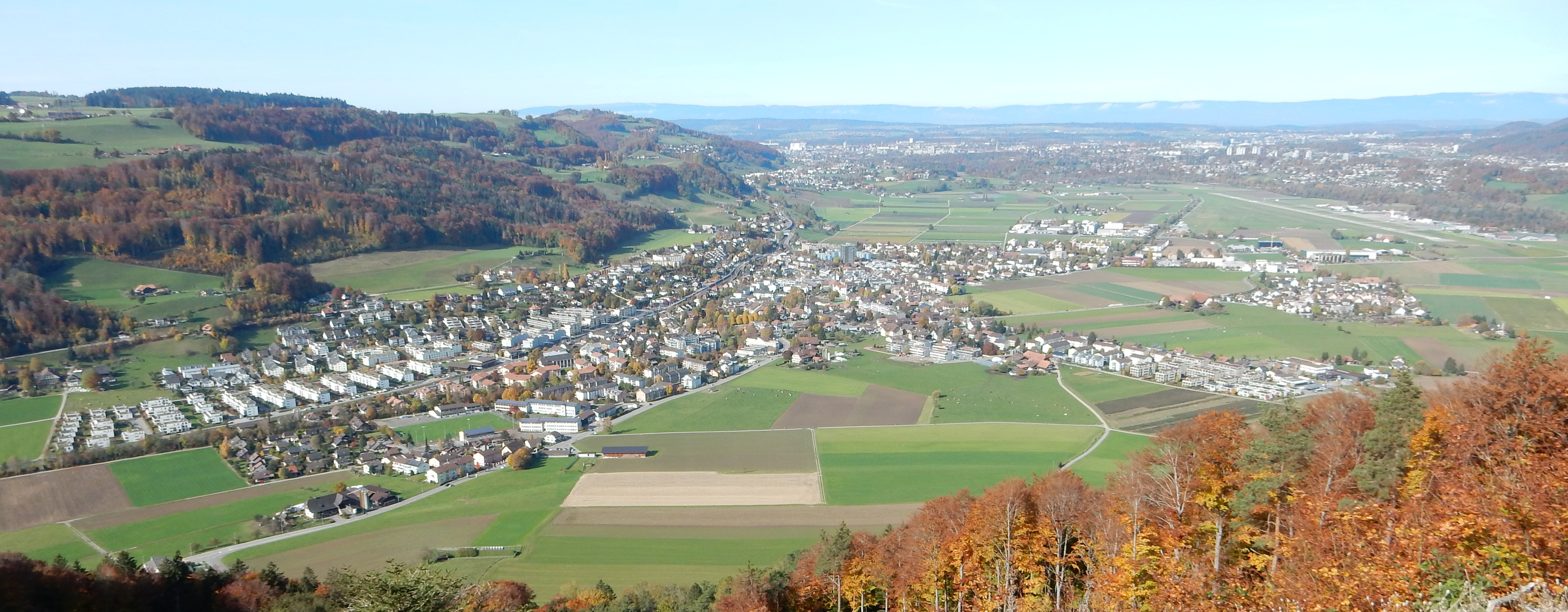

- Flag Coat of arms
- Location of Belp
- Location within Switzerland Location within Canton of Bern
- Coordinates: 46°53′N 7°30′E
- Country: Switzerland
- Canton: Bern
- District: Seftigen

Area
  - Total: 17.6 km^{2} (6.8 sq mi)
- Elevation: 521 m (1,709 ft)

Population (Dec 2011)
  - Total: 10,974
  - Density: 624/km^{2} (1,610/sq mi)
- Time zone: UTC+01:00 (CET)
  - Summer (DST): UTC+02:00 (CEST)
- Postal code: 3123
- SFOS number: 861
- ISO 3166 code: CH-BE
- Surrounded by: Allmendingen, Belpberg, Gerzensee, Kehrsatz, Münsingen, Muri bei Bern, Rubigen, Toffen, Wald
- Website: www.belp.ch

Belp (Highest Alemannic: Bäup) is a municipality in the Bern-Mittelland administrative district in the canton of Bern in Switzerland. It is close to Bern's Belp Airport. The municipality of Belpberg merged on 1 January 2012 into the municipality of Belp.

== History ==
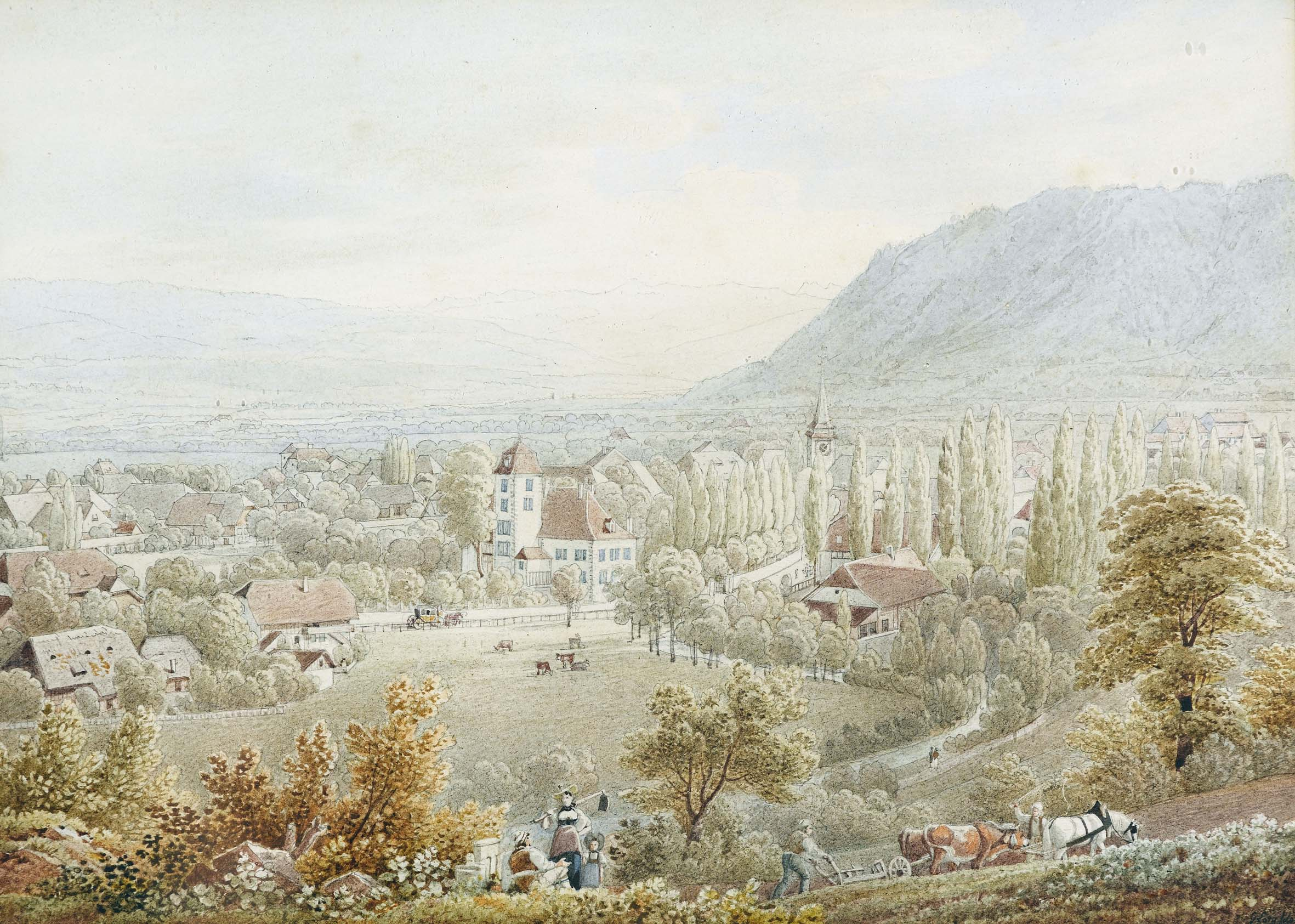
Painting by Gabriel Lory, Ansicht von Belp

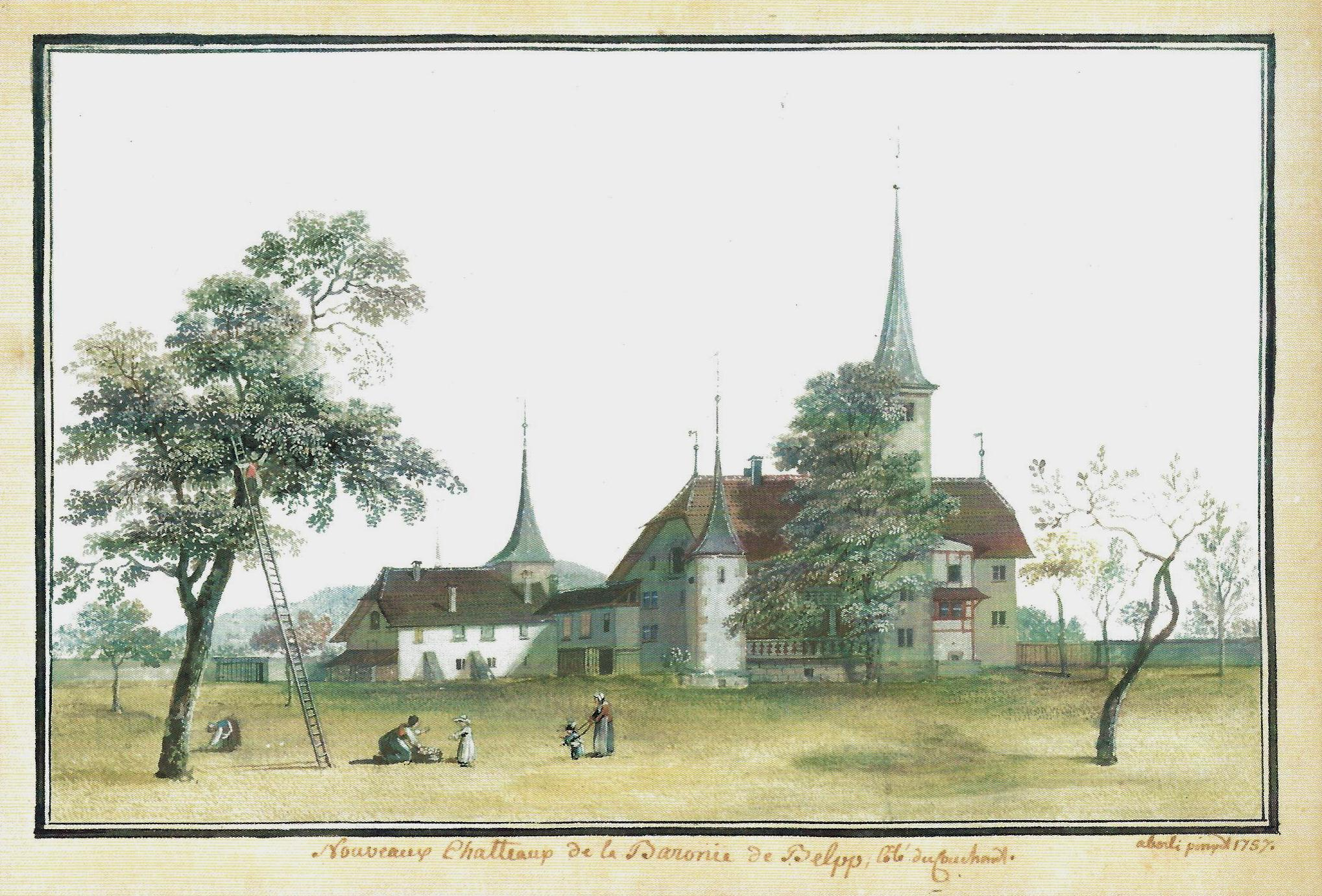
Belp Castle in 1757

Belp is first mentioned in 1263 as Belpo.

Scattered neolithic artifacts indicate that the Belp area was inhabited prehistorically. Bronze Age cemeteries and La Tène artifacts show that there were villages near modern Belp before the Roman invasion. After the collapse of the Roman Empire the area may have been uninhabited, but by the High Middle Ages there were villages and wooden castles here. Very little is known about Fahrhubel Castle, located about 700 meters (2,300 ft) north-west of the Hunzigenbrücke (Hunzigen Bridge), and it was eventually completely demolished.

Hohberg Castle, on the northern slope of the Belpberg, was the ancestral seat of the Freiherren of Belp-Montenach. It was built around 1135 and today only ruins remain. During the 12th and 13th centuries, the family expanded their authority from Belp to include neighboring villages. In 1277 they created the Herrschaft of Belp to include all their estates and villages. Their expanding power brought them into conflict with the growing city-state of Bern and in 1298 Bern attacked Belp. At the Battle of Donnerbühl or Dornbühl in 1298 Bern destroyed the castle. Eight years later, in 1306, they forced the Freiherren of Belp-Montenach to become citizens of Bern and give up their independence. The Hölzernes Schloss or Wooden Castle was built in 1327 by the Freiherr in Belp village. By the late 14th century the male line of the Belp-Montenach family died out and Belp and the surrounding lands were acquired by a noble family in Bern. Over the following centuries, Belp passed through several noble families. In 1550-54 the von Luternau family built the Old Castle in the village across from the Wooden Castle. The Old Castle was the administrative seat of the Herrschaft during the 16th and 17th centuries.

By the 18th century, wealthy Bernese families began moving to Belp to escape the noise and crowding in the city. In 1735 Victor Fischer built Oberried Estate above the growing town. This estate was followed in 1740 by the Schlössli or Neues Schloss on Rubigenstrasse which was built for the historian Alexander Ludwig von Wattenwyl. Lindenegg Mansion was built in 1800.

The Wooden Castle was demolished in 1783. In 1721 the von Wattenwyl family acquired the Herrschaft, which they ruled until the 1798 French invasion and creation of the Helvetic Republic abolished the old aristocratic order. In 1810 the Canton of Bern bought the castle from Karl von Wattenwyl and used it as the center of the newly created Seftigen District.

The village church of St. Peter and Paul was first mentioned in 1228. It was probably established by the Freiherr of Belp. In 1334, Interlaken Monastery received the patronage rights over the church. In 1528, Bern adopted the new faith of the Protestant Reformation and Belp converted. After Bern forcefully secularized Interlaken Monastery, the patronage rights passed to Bern.

The Aare river correction of 1829-31 and the Gürbe river correction of 1855-60 helped open up new farmland and prevented devastating floods in the municipality. The river ferries were replaced with the Hunzigen or August Bridge in 1836. It was replaced with the larger Schützenfahr Bridge in 1883 and today is a covered pedestrian bridge. The Industrial Revolution reached Belp in 1844 when a cloth factory settled in the village. The factory operated until 1974. In 1928-29 the Belpmoos airport opened outside the town. It eventually grew into the Bern-Belp Regional Airport. Today, almost two-thirds of the population commutes to jobs outside the municipality and about two-thirds of the jobs in Belp are in the services sector.

== Geography ==
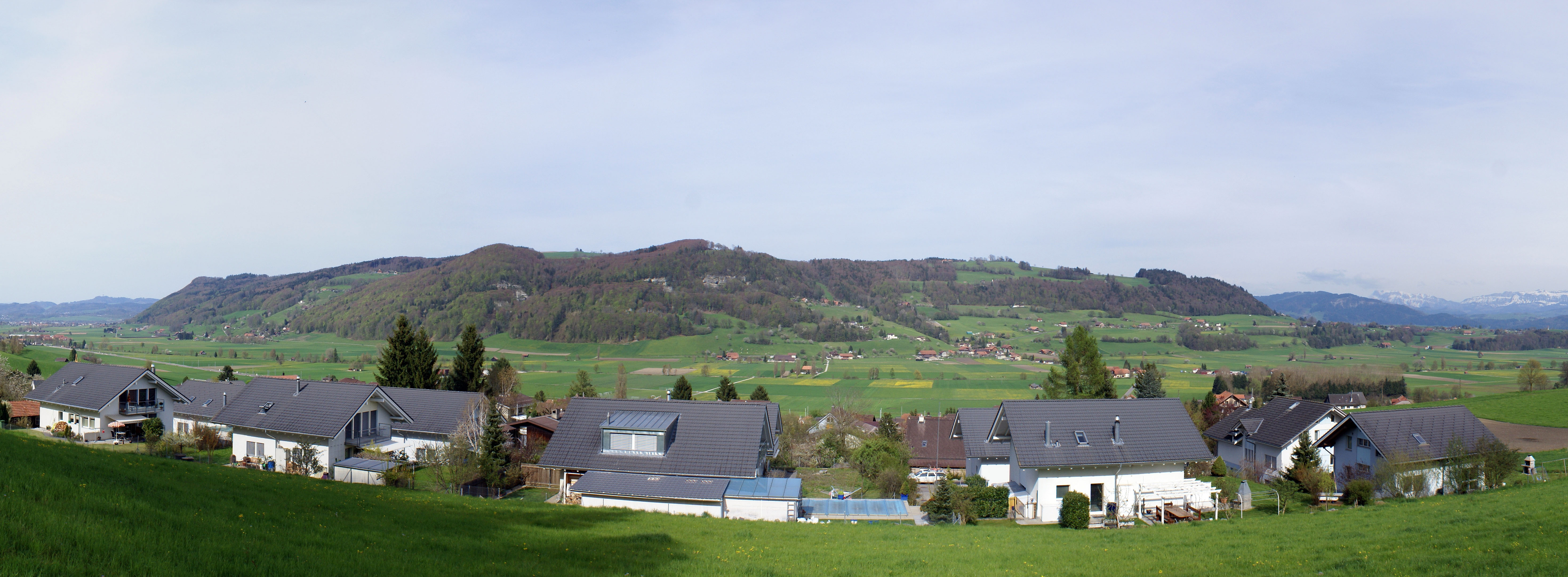
Belpberg and the Gürbetal (Gürbe Valley)

Aerial view (1952)

Before the merger Belp had an area, as of 2009, of 17.59 km^{2} (6.79 sq mi). After the 2012 merger, Belp has an area of 23.26 km^{2} (8.98 sq mi). As of 2012, a total of 13.38 km^{2} (5.17 mi^{2}) or 57.4% is used for agricultural purposes, while 6.04 km^{2} (2.33 mi^{2}) or 25.9% is forested. The rest of the municipality is 3.31 km^{2} (1.28 mi^{2}) or 14.2% is settled (buildings or roads), 0.49 km^{2} (0.19 mi^{2}) or 2.1% is either rivers or lakes and 0.05 km^{2} (12 acres) or 0.2% is unproductive land.

During the same year, housing and buildings made up 7.3% and transportation infrastructure made up 4.9%. A total of 24.6% of the total land area is heavily forested and 1.4% is covered with orchards or small clusters of trees. Of the agricultural land, 39.1% is used for growing crops and 17.3% is pasturage, while 1.1% is used for orchards or vine crops. Of the water in the municipality, 0.3% is in lakes and 1.8% is in rivers and streams.

The municipality is located at the mouth of the Gürbetal and on the left bank of the Aare river. It includes the village of Belp, the hamlets of Viehweide, Heitern and Hofmatt. In recent years, a number of new developments have been built including Eissel (1956–75), Montenach (1960s), Schafmatt (1970s), Hühnerhubel (1980). The parish includes Belp, Belpberg and Toffen. It is home to the Bern-Belp regional airport.

On 1 January 2012 the former municipality of Belpberg merged into the municipality of Belp.

On 31 December 2009 Amtsbezirk Seftigen, the municipality's former district, was dissolved. On the following day, 1 January 2010, it joined the newly created Verwaltungskreis Bern-Mittelland.

== Coat of arms ==
The blazon of the municipal coat of arms is Quartered Gules and Argent.

== Demographics ==
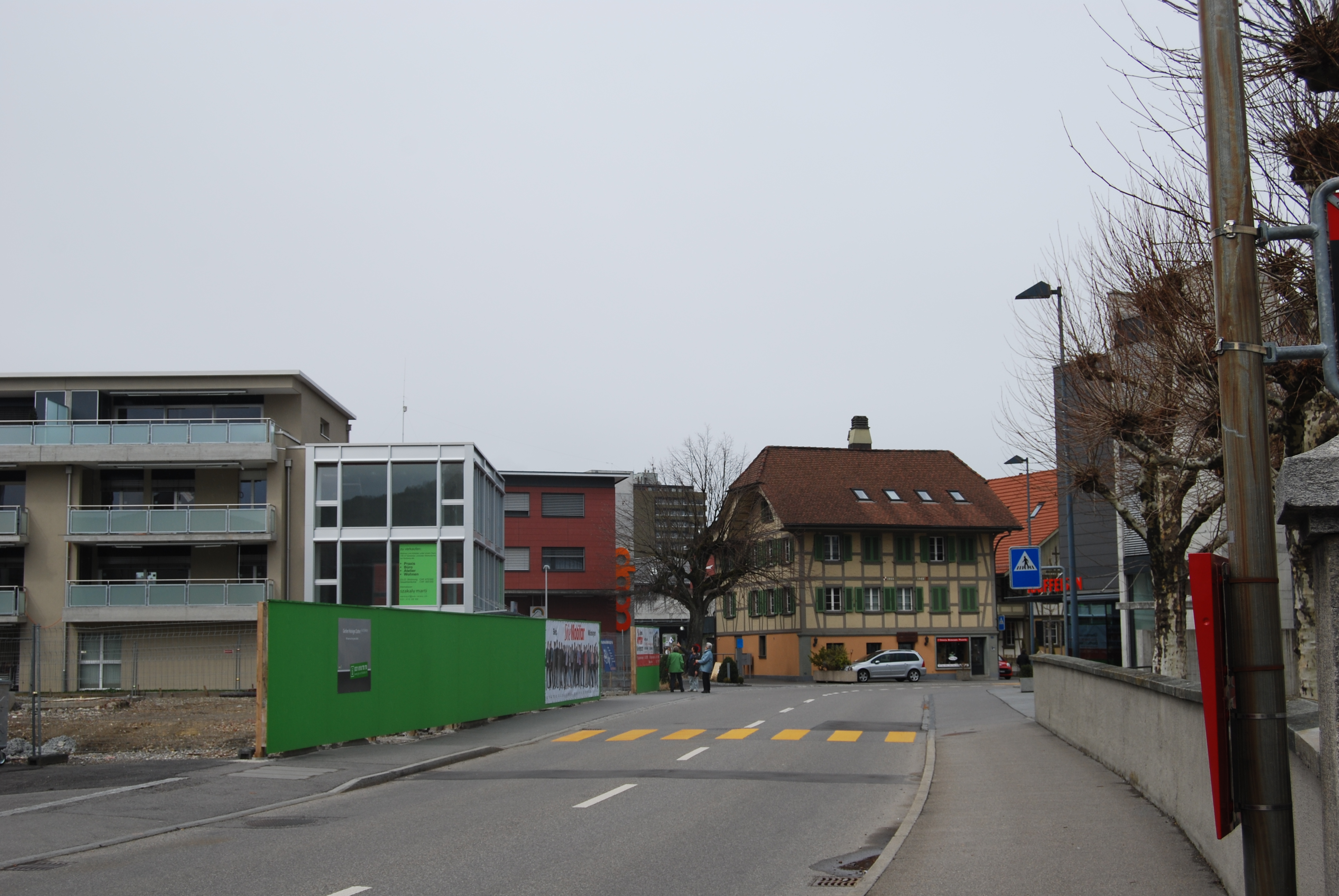
Belp

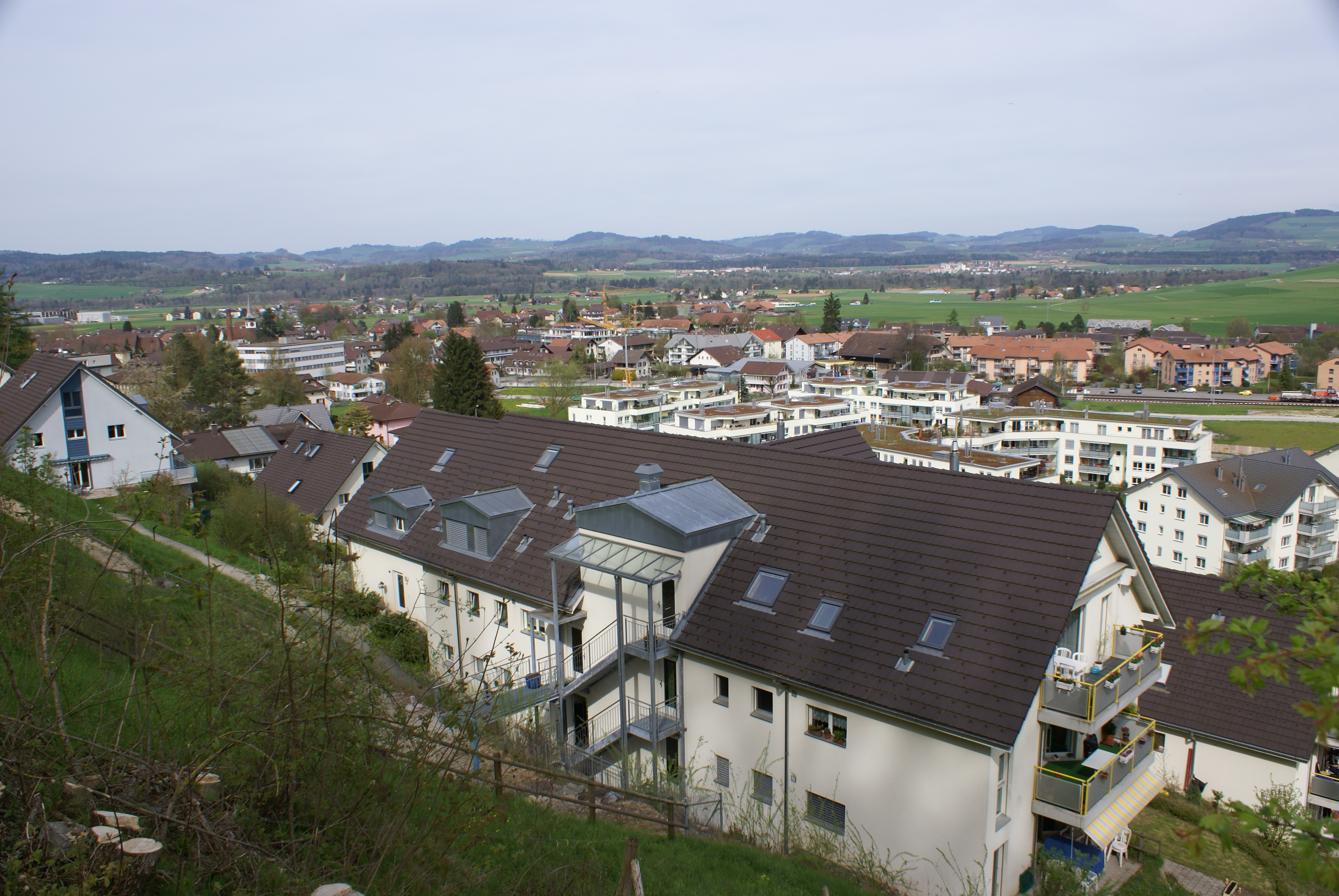
View of Belp from the south-west

Belp has a population (as of December 2020) of 11,603. As of 2011, 11.8% of the population are resident foreign nationals. Over the last year (2010-2011) the population has changed at a rate of 3.2%. Migration accounted for 2.5%, while births and deaths accounted for 0.4%.

Most of the population (as of 2000) speaks German (8,505 or 92.5%) as their first language, French is the second most common (107 or 1.2%) and Albanian is the third (107 or 1.2%). There are 103 people who speak Italian and 5 people who speak Romansh.

As of 2008, the population was 48.8% male and 51.2% female. The population was made up of 4,376 Swiss men (42.8% of the population) and 608 (5.9%) non-Swiss men. There were 4,679 Swiss women (45.8%) and 558 (5.5%) non-Swiss women. Of the population in the municipality, 2,500 or about 27.2% were born in Belp and lived there in 2000. There were 3,908 or 42.5% who were born in the same canton, while 1,434 or 15.6% were born somewhere else in Switzerland, and 1,052 or 11.4% were born outside of Switzerland.

As of 2011, children and teenagers (0–19 years old) make up 20.3% of the population, while adults (20–64 years old) make up 62.2% and seniors (over 64 years old) make up 17.5%.

As of 2000, there were 3,754 people who were single and never married in the municipality. There were 4,468 married individuals, 492 widows or widowers and 479 individuals who are divorced.

As of 2010, there were 1,484 households that consist of only one person and 211 households with five or more people. In 2000, a total of 3,772 apartments (93.6% of the total) were permanently occupied, while 175 apartments (4.3%) were seasonally occupied and 84 apartments (2.1%) were empty. As of 2010, the construction rate of new housing units was 13 new units per 1000 residents. The vacancy rate for the municipality, in 2010, was 1.26%. In 2011, single family homes made up 48.4% of the total housing in the municipality.

The historical population is given in the following chart:

== Heritage sites of national significance ==
The Bider-Hangar at the airport and Oberried Estate are listed as Swiss heritage site of national significance.

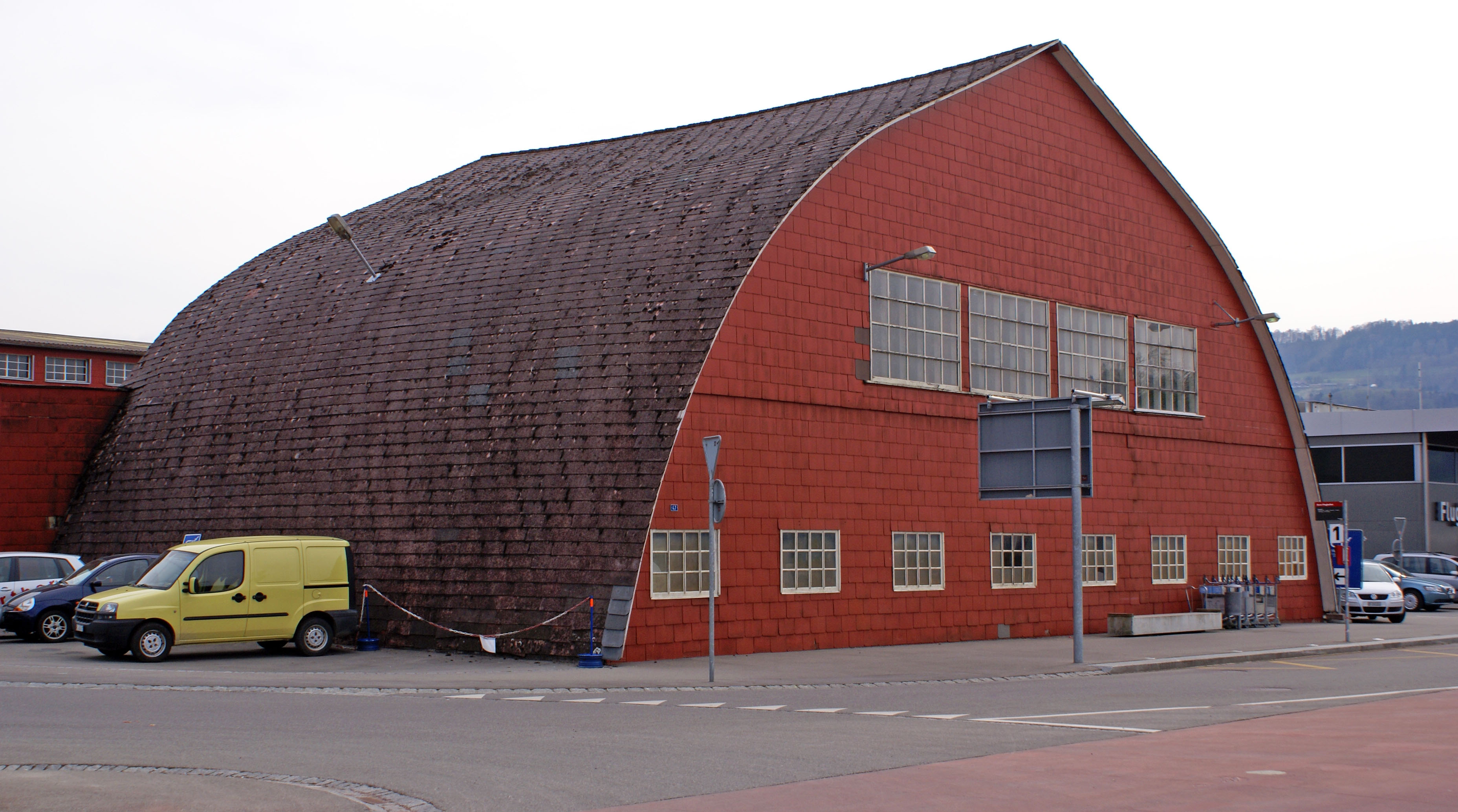
Bider Hangar

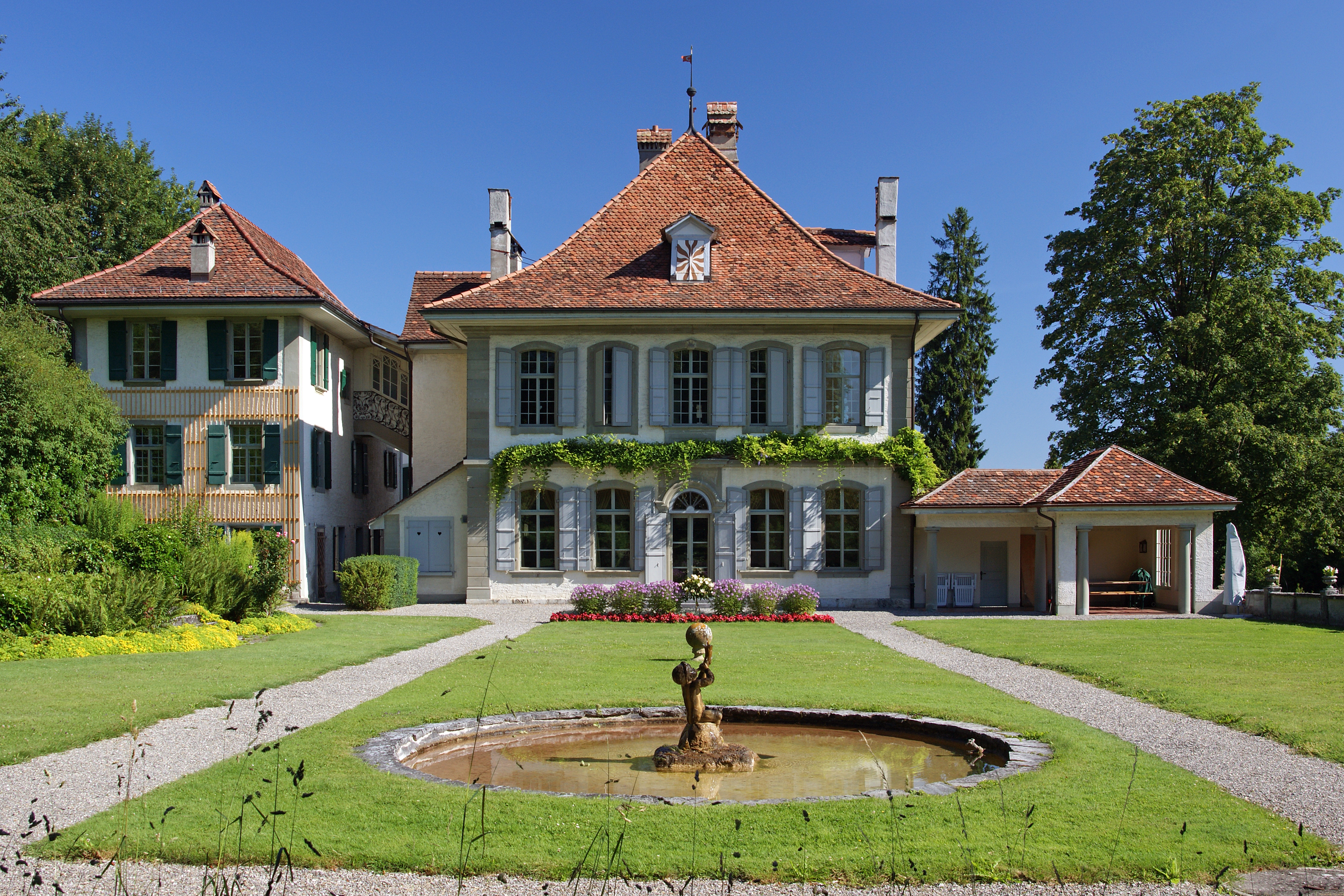
Oberried Estate

== Politics ==
In the 2011 federal election the most popular party was the Swiss People's Party (SVP) which received 29.9% of the vote. The next three most popular parties were the Social Democratic Party (SP) (17.8%), the Conservative Democratic Party (BDP) (15.9%) and the FDP.The Liberals (7.9%). In the federal election, a total of 3,948 votes were cast, and the voter turnout was 51.3%.

== Economy ==
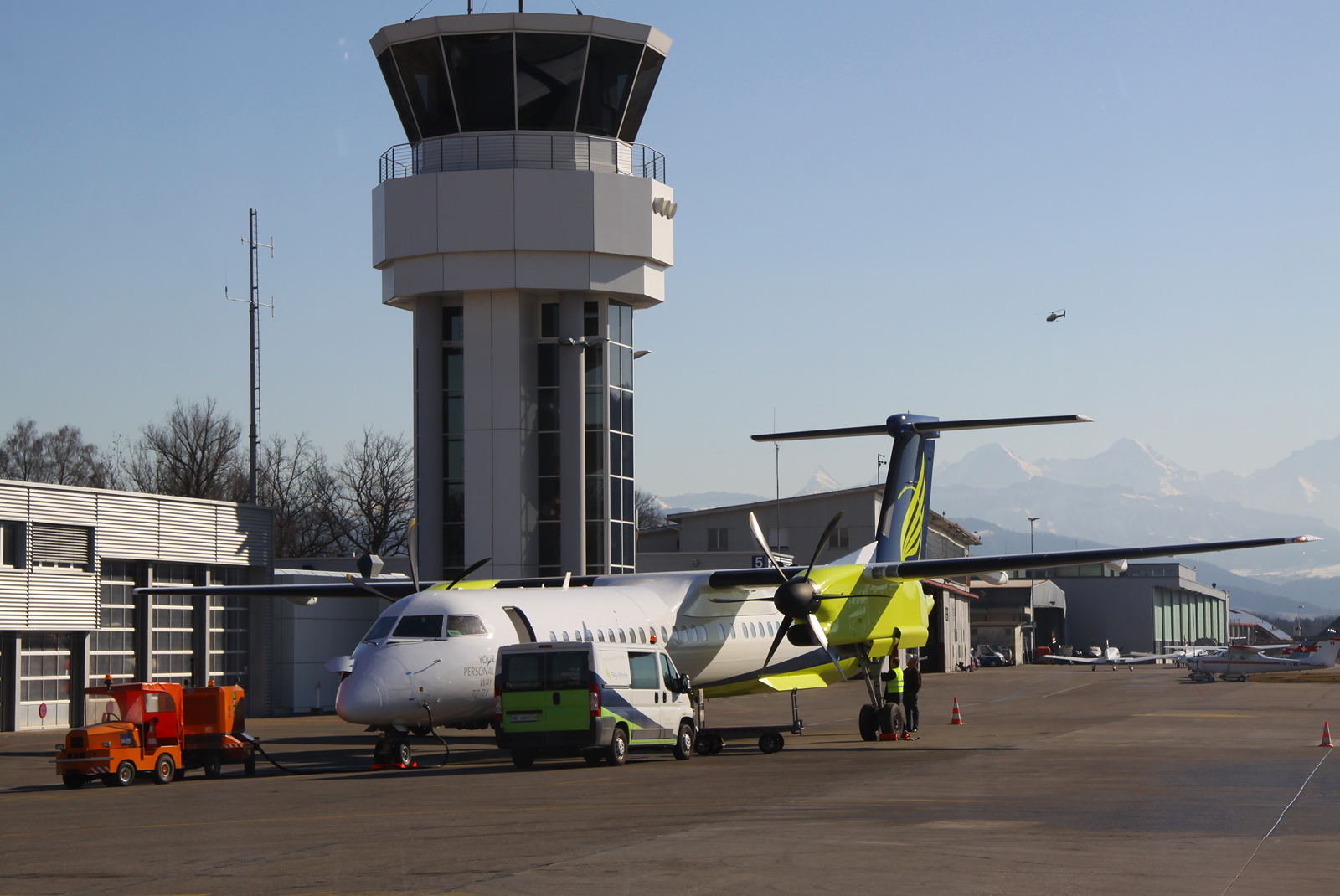
Airport tower and a Sky Work Q400 at Bern-Belp Airport

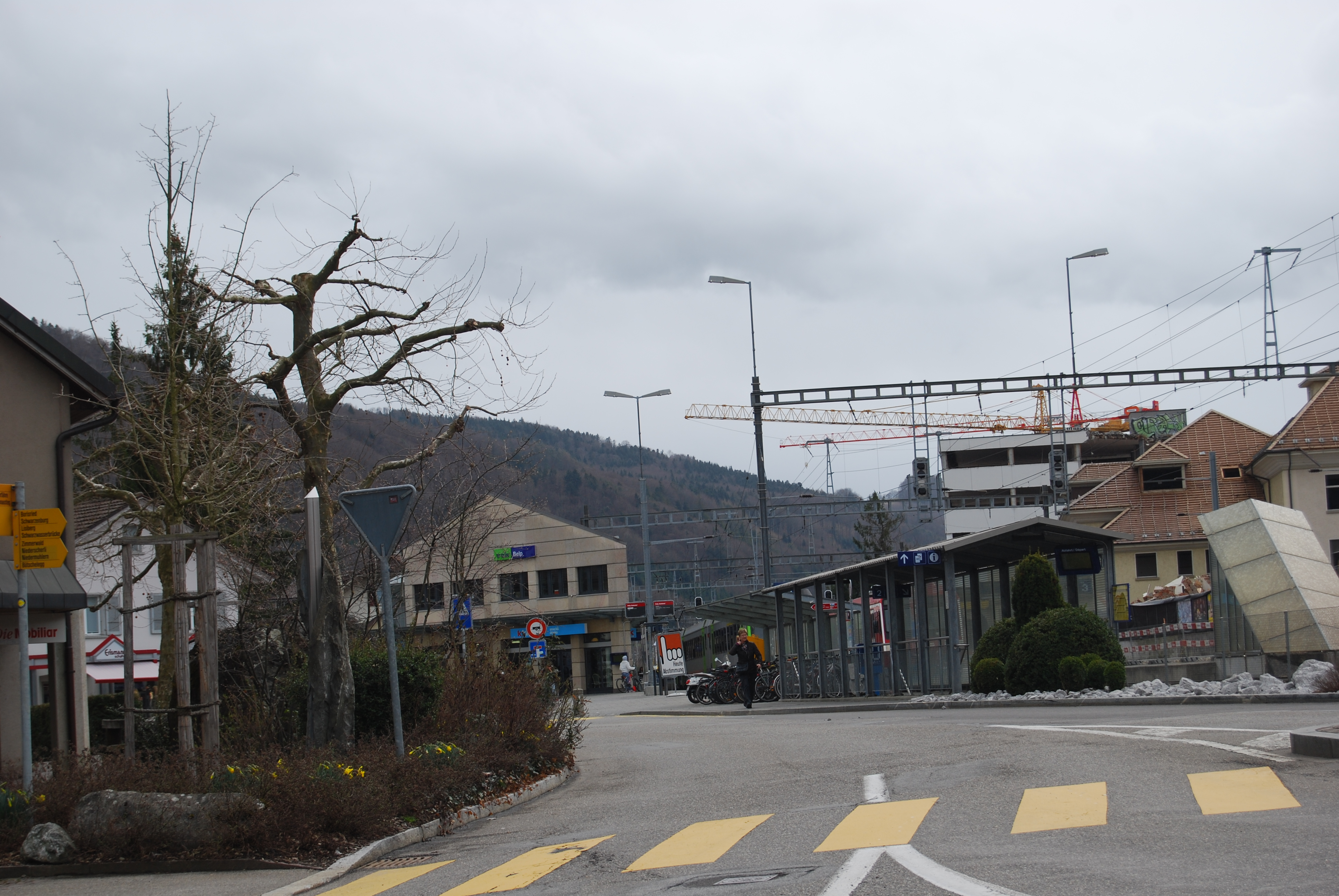
Belp railroad station

Sky Work Airlines has its head office in Belp. The head office of Heliswiss is located on the grounds of Bern Airport in Belp, and SkyWorks previously had its head office on the airport grounds.

As of 2011, Belp had an unemployment rate of 2.02%. As of 2008, there were a total of 4,372 people employed in the municipality. Of these, there were 323 people employed in the primary economic sector and about 85 businesses involved in this sector. 1,147 people were employed in the secondary sector and there were 93 businesses in this sector. 2,902 people were employed in the tertiary sector, with 345 businesses in this sector. There were 5,081 residents of the municipality who were employed in some capacity, of which females made up 44.0% of the workforce.

In 2008 there were a total of 3,426 full-time equivalent jobs. The number of jobs in the primary sector was 113, of which 108 were in agriculture, 4 were in forestry or lumber production and 1 was in fishing or fisheries. The number of jobs in the secondary sector was 1,056 of which 686 or (65.0%) were in manufacturing and 340 (32.2%) were in construction. The number of jobs in the tertiary sector was 2,257. In the tertiary sector; 760 or 33.7% were in wholesale or retail sales or the repair of motor vehicles, 251 or 11.1% were in the movement and storage of goods, 134 or 5.9% were in a hotel or restaurant, 78 or 3.5% were in the information industry, 67 or 3.0% were the insurance or financial industry, 190 or 8.4% were technical professionals or scientists, 153 or 6.8% were in education and 403 or 17.9% were in health care.

In 2000, there were 2,464 workers who commuted into the municipality and 3,297 workers who commuted away. The municipality is a net exporter of workers, with about 1.3 workers leaving the municipality for every one entering. A total of 1,784 workers (42.0% of the 4,248 total workers in the municipality) both lived and worked in Belp. Of the working population, 26.8% used public transportation to get to work, and 46% used a private car.

In 2011 the average local and cantonal tax rate on a married resident, with two children, of Belp making 150,000 CHF was 11.6%, while an unmarried resident's rate was 17%. For comparison, the average rate for the entire canton in the same year, was 14.2% and 22.0%, while the nationwide average was 12.3% and 21.1% respectively.

In 2009 there were a total of 4,678 tax payers in the municipality. Of that total, 1,787 made over 75,000 CHF per year. There were 31 people who made between 15,000 and 20,000 per year. The average income of the over 75,000 CHF group in Belp was 115,784 CHF, while the average across all of Switzerland was 130,478 CHF.

In 2011 a total of 4.1% of the population received direct financial assistance from the government.

== Religion ==
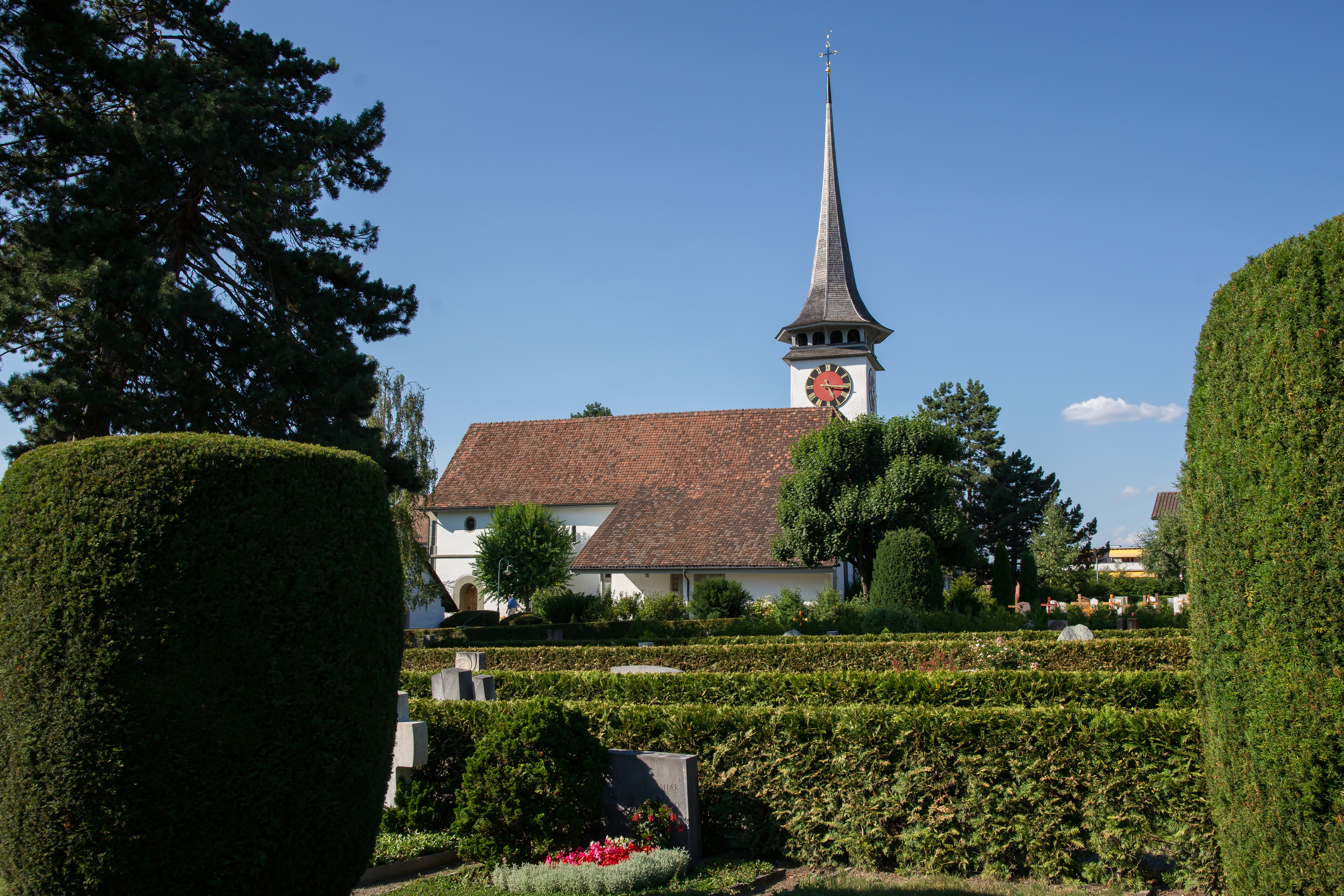
Swiss Reformed church in Belp

From the 2000 census, 6,020 or 65.5% belonged to the Swiss Reformed Church, while 1,277 or 13.9% were Roman Catholic. Of the rest of the population, there were 75 members of an Orthodox church (or about 0.82% of the population), there were 2 individuals (or about 0.02% of the population) who belonged to the Christian Catholic Church, and there were 560 individuals (or about 6.09% of the population) who belonged to another Christian church. There were 9 individuals (or about 0.10% of the population) who were Jewish, and 307 (or about 3.34% of the population) who were Muslim. There were 22 individuals who were Buddhist, 50 individuals who were Hindu and 7 individuals who belonged to another church. 585 (or about 6.36% of the population) belonged to no church, are agnostic or atheist, and 279 individuals (or about 3.03% of the population) did not answer the question.

== Climate ==
Between 1981 and 2010 Belp had an average of 127.9 days of rain or snow per year and on average received 1,143 mm (45.0 in) of precipitation. The wettest month was May during which time Belp received an average of 123 mm (4.8 in) of rain or snow. During this month there was precipitation for an average of 12.8 days. The driest month of the year was February with an average of 66 mm (2.6 in) of precipitation over 9.6 days.

== Education ==
In Belp about 60.8% of the population have completed non-mandatory upper secondary education, and 19.8% have completed additional higher education (either university or a Fachhochschule). Of the 1,183 who had completed some form of tertiary schooling listed in the census, 69.5% were Swiss men, 22.5% were Swiss women, 5.3% were non-Swiss men and 2.7% were non-Swiss women.

The Canton of Bern school system provides one year of non-obligatory Kindergarten, followed by six years of Primary school. This is followed by three years of obligatory lower Secondary school where the students are separated according to ability and aptitude. Following the lower Secondary students may attend additional schooling or they may enter an apprenticeship.

During the 2011–12 school year, there were a total of 1,161 students attending classes in Belp. There were 8 kindergarten classes with a total of 140 students in the municipality. Of the kindergarten students, 20.0% were permanent or temporary residents of Switzerland (not citizens) and 11.4% have a different mother language than the classroom language. The municipality had 31 primary classes and 602 students. Of the primary students, 16.3% were permanent or temporary residents of Switzerland (not citizens) and 14.3% have a different mother language than the classroom language. During the same year, there were 22 lower secondary classes with a total of 411 students. There were 10.5% who were permanent or temporary residents of Switzerland (not citizens) and 6.3% have a different mother language than the classroom language. The remainder of the students attend a private or special school.

As of 2000, there were a total of 949 students attending any school in the municipality. Of those, 876 both lived and attended school in the municipality, while 73 students came from another municipality. During the same year, 371 residents attended schools outside the municipality.

Belp is home to the Gemeindebibliothek Belp (municipal library of Belp). The library has (as of 2008) 13,040 books or other media, and loaned out 79,886 items in the same year. It was open a total of 312 days with average of 18 hours per week during that year.

== Notable people ==
- Bruno Messerli (1931 in Belp – 2019) a Swiss geographer and university professor, who focused on geographic high mountain research
- Rudolf Joder (born 1950) politician, member of the Swiss National Council and lawyer; lives in Belp
- Nicolas Bürgy (born 1995 in Belp) a Swiss footballer who plays for FC Thun, over 50 club caps
