= Vogt (Switzerland) =

Title and office in the Old Swiss Confederacy

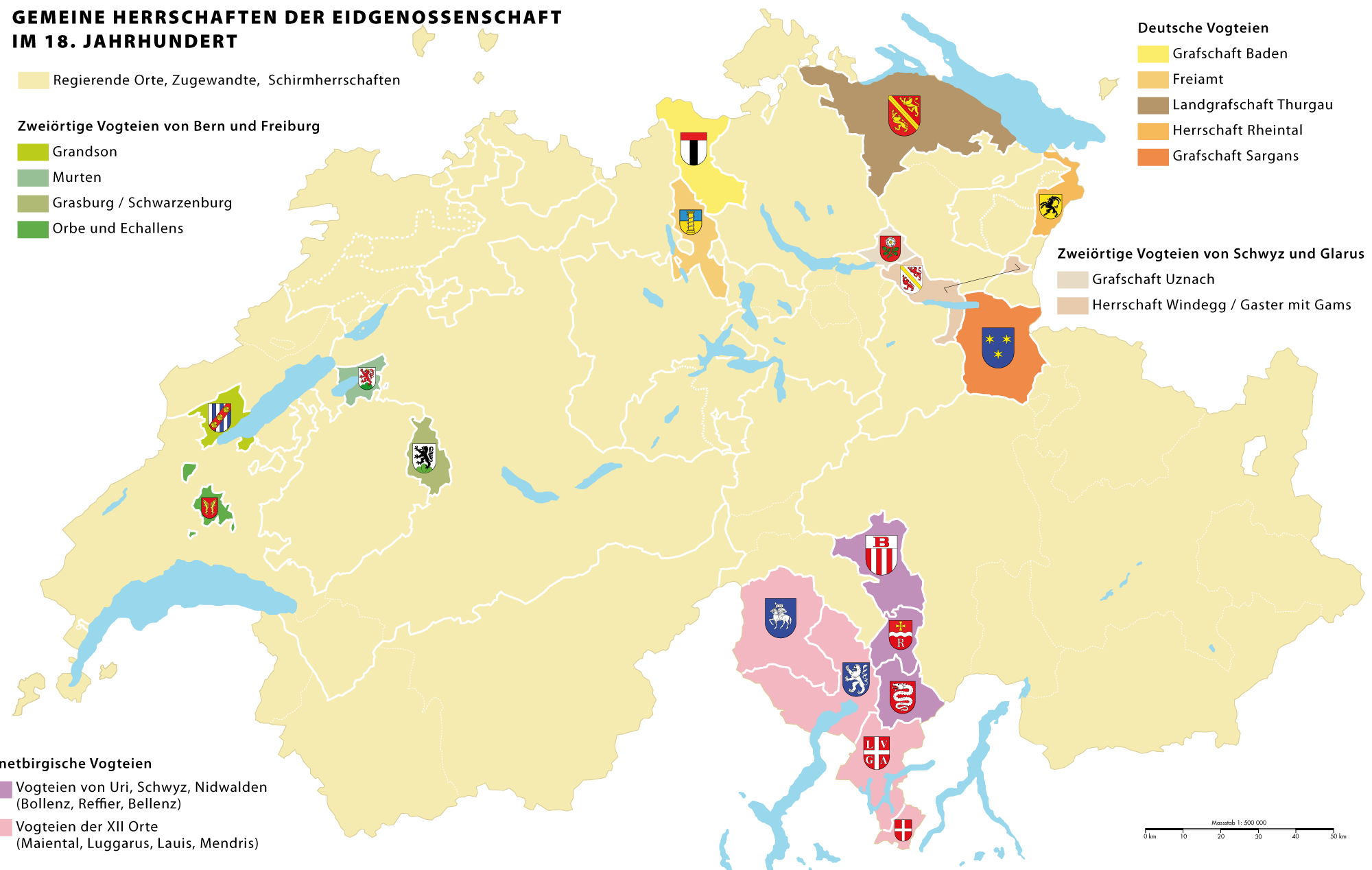
Swiss condominiums in the 18th century

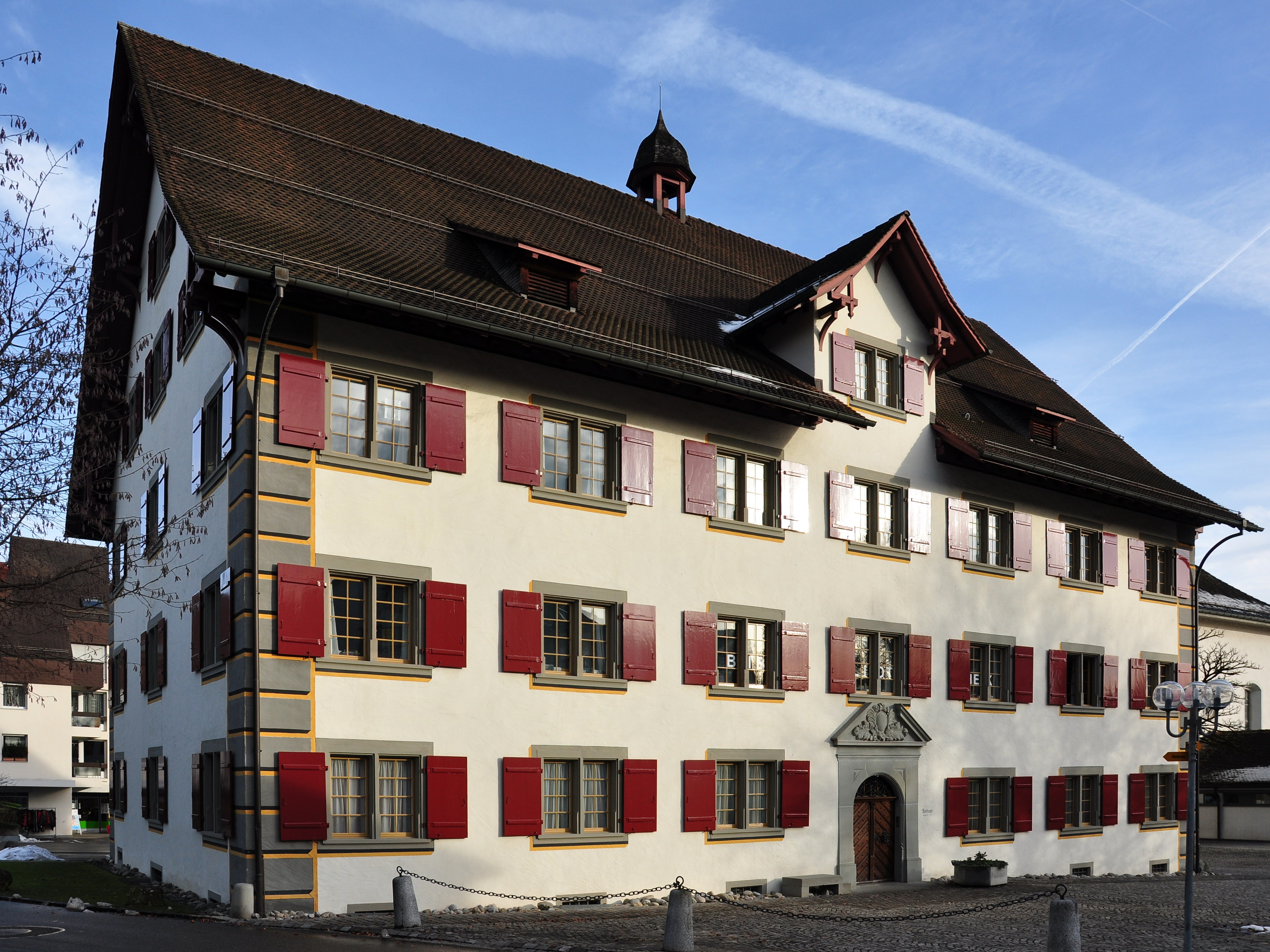
Former Amthaus in Rüti ZH

A Vogt (plural Vögte) was a title and office in the Old Swiss Confederacy, inherited from the feudal system of the Holy Roman Empire, corresponding to the English reeve. The German term Vogtei is ultimately a loan from Latin [ad]vocatia.

== Vogtei ==
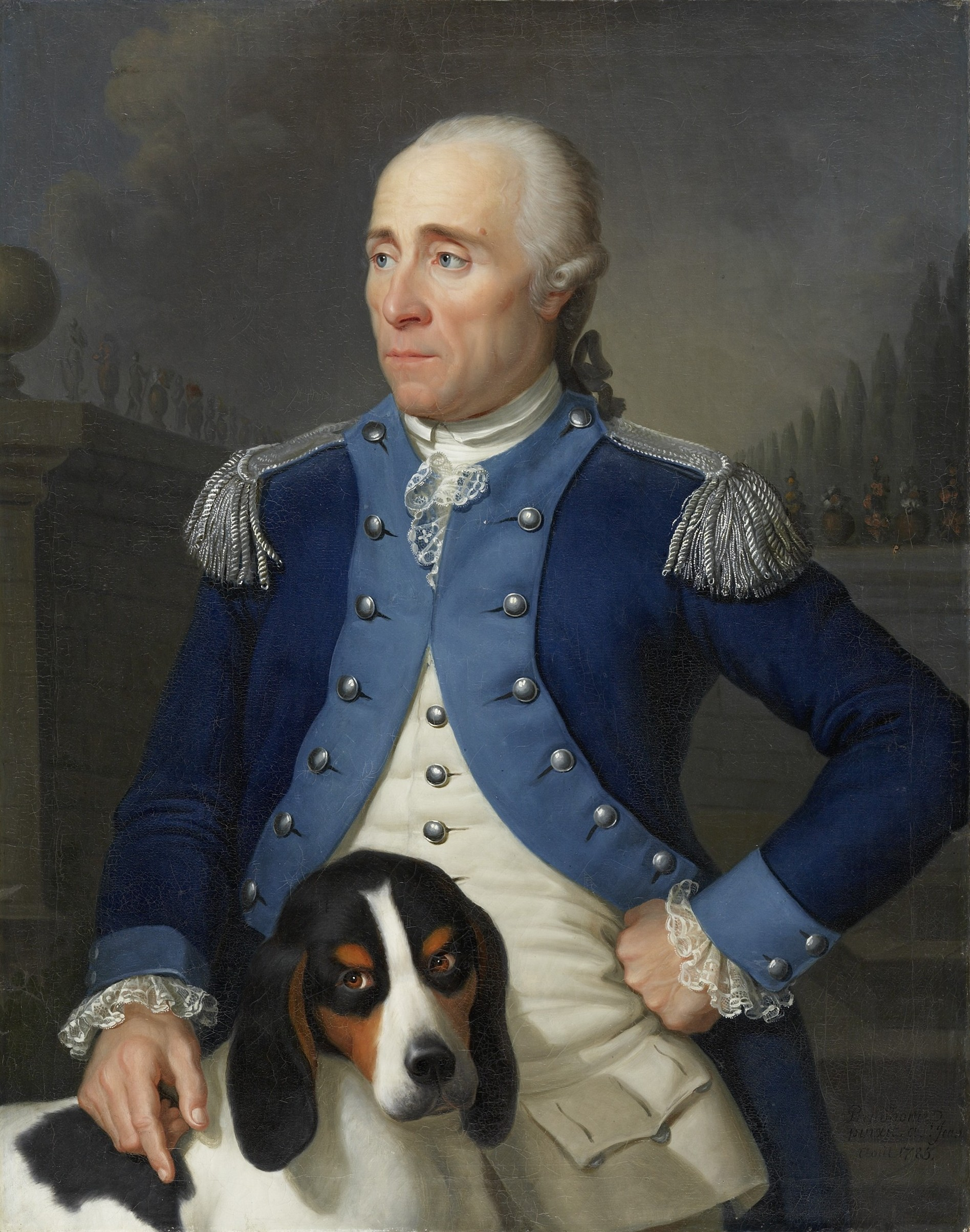
Franz Rudolf Frisching, bailiff in the Vallemaggia in 1770, in the uniform of an officer of the Bernese Huntsmen Corps with his Berner Laufhund, painted by Jean Preudhomme in 1785

There were two basic types of Vogteien: Obervogteien (also Landgerichte, innere Vogteien) were administered by reeves (Obervögte, Venner) residing in the city, usually elected from among the city parliament, who visited their territories on certain fixed days to act as judges or collect taxes. They were represented by local lieutenants (Untervögte).

== Reichsvogt ==
Reichsvogt was the term for a Vogt, that was nominated by the king as the representative of the Holy Roman Empire, and was especially in today's Switzerland in the High Middle Ages a very influential position.

== Landvogt ==
The second type of Vogtei was a Landvogtei where the Landvogt ("sheriff" or "bailiff") resided permanently, usually in a castle within the Landvogtei known as Landvogteischloss. There are several buildings still so identified, e.g. in Baden and in Willisau. A Landvogt was an official acting on behalf of the Confederacy or one or several cantons, ruling a condominium (Gemeine Herrschaft) of several cantons, notably acting as a judge for capital crimes (Blutgericht). The title first appears in 1415. The cantons took turns in appointing a Landvogt for a period of two years.

In exceptional cases, the population of the Landvogtei was allowed to elect their own Landvogt. This concerned Oberhasli in particular, which was nominally a subject territory of Bern, but enjoyed a special status as a military ally.

The office of Landvogt was abolished in 1798, with the foundation of the Helvetic Republic.

The notion of fremde Vögte ("foreign reeves") is central to Swiss national mythology, since the early Confederacy in the 14th century is commonly believed to have had the main purpose to expel imperial judges. One of the core points of the Federal Charter of 1291 is that the Eidgenossen "will accept or receive no judge in the aforesaid valleys, who shall have obtained his office for any price, or for money in any way whatever, or one who shall not be a native or a resident with us." The "foreign Vögte" were replaced by native Ammänner called into office by the Landsgemeinde.

The term fremde Vögte is still in use polemically in Swiss politics, particularly by conservatives, in the context of Switzerland and the European Union.

== See also ==
- Gemeine Herrschaften
- Talschaft
- Reichsvogt
- Landammann
- Avoyer
