= Jakob Emanuel Handmann =

Swiss painter (1718–1781)

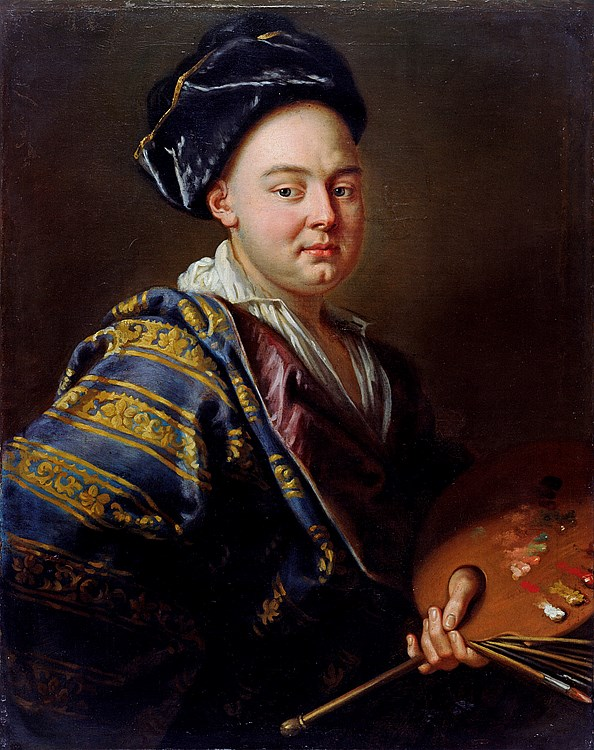
Self-portrait with turban, 1745

Jakob Emanuel Handmann (16 August 1718 – 3 November 1781) was a Swiss painter who specialised in portrait painting. He was a contemporary of the Swiss painters Anton Graff, Jean Preudhomme, Angelica Kauffman, Johann Jakob Schalch, Johann Caspar Füssli and his son Johann Heinrich Füssli.

== Life and work ==
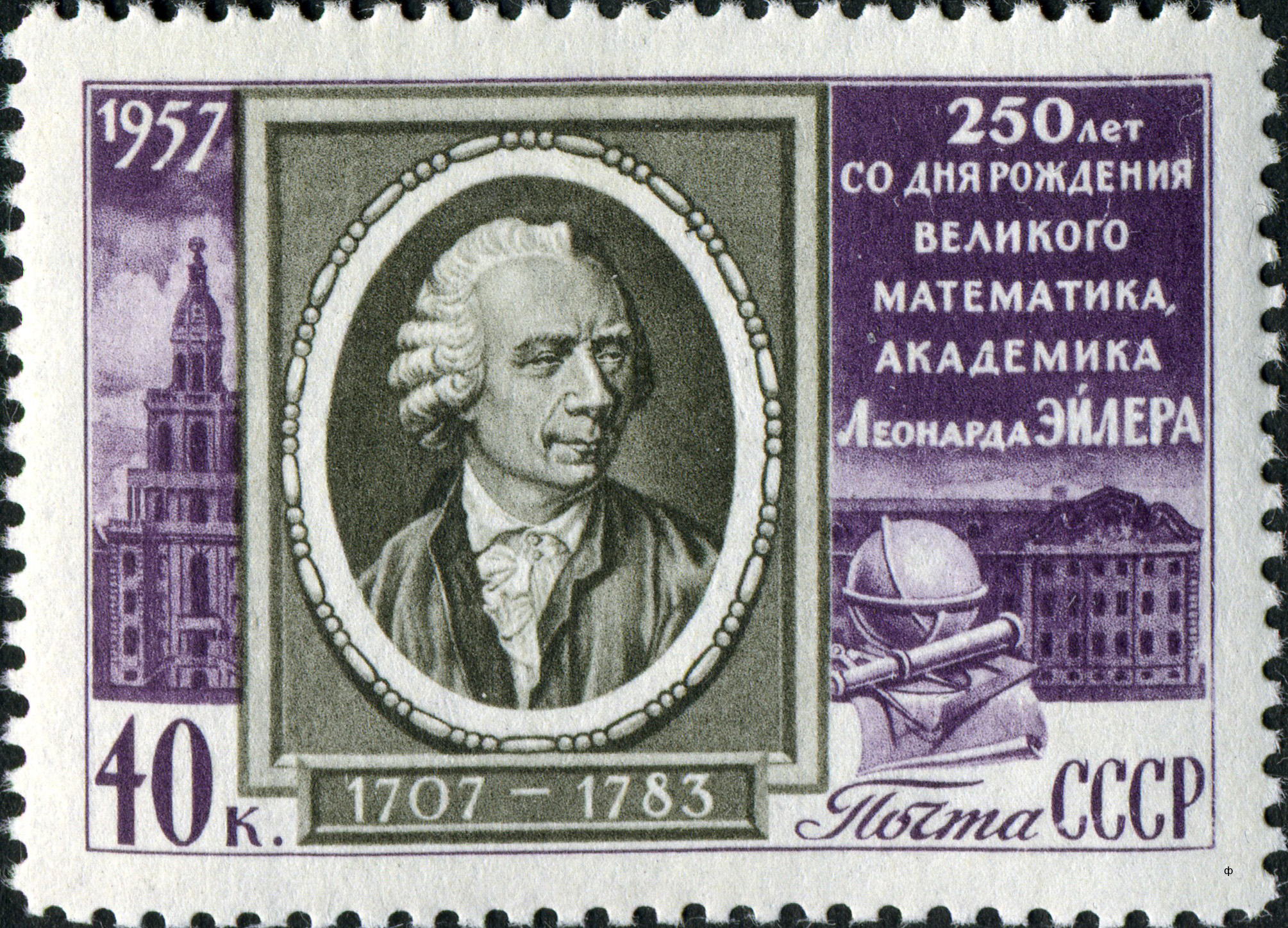
Soviet stamp with Handmann's portrait of Leonhard Euler, 1957

Handmann was born on 16 August 1718 in Basel, Switzerland. He was the ninth of fourteen children of Johann Jakob Handmann, a baker and later bailiff of Waldenburg, and his wife, Anna Maria Rispach. Between 1735 and 1739, he made an apprenticeship as a stucco plasterer and studied painting in Schaffhausen with the painter and stucco plasterer Johann Ulrich Schnetzler.

He made study trips to Paris, Rome and Naples. From 1739 to 1742, he worked in Paris at the studio of Jean Restout the Younger, who influenced his work. In 1742 Handmann travelled through France finding employment in a portrait studio partnership with the painter Hörling. In the business partnership with Hörling, Handmann was mainly responsible for painting the heads of the sitters. At the end of 1742, Handmann went to Italy and reached Rome in the spring of 1743; he worked among others in the studios of Marco Benefial and Pierre Subleyras in Rome. There he mainly copied masterpieces from the Classical Antiquity and Renaissance periods.

By June 1746, he was back in Switzerland. In 1747 he settled down in Basel. In Basel he opened his own studio. However, many of his clients were patricians from the city and the area of Bern. Thanks to the acquaintance of the Estonian nobleman Colonel Carl Friedrich von Staal, Handmann became a member of the “Accademia Clementina” of Bologna in 1773. Apart from a trip to Germany in 1753, he never again left his native country.

== Gallery ==
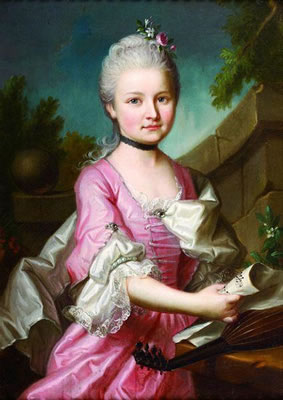
A Young Musician, 1772

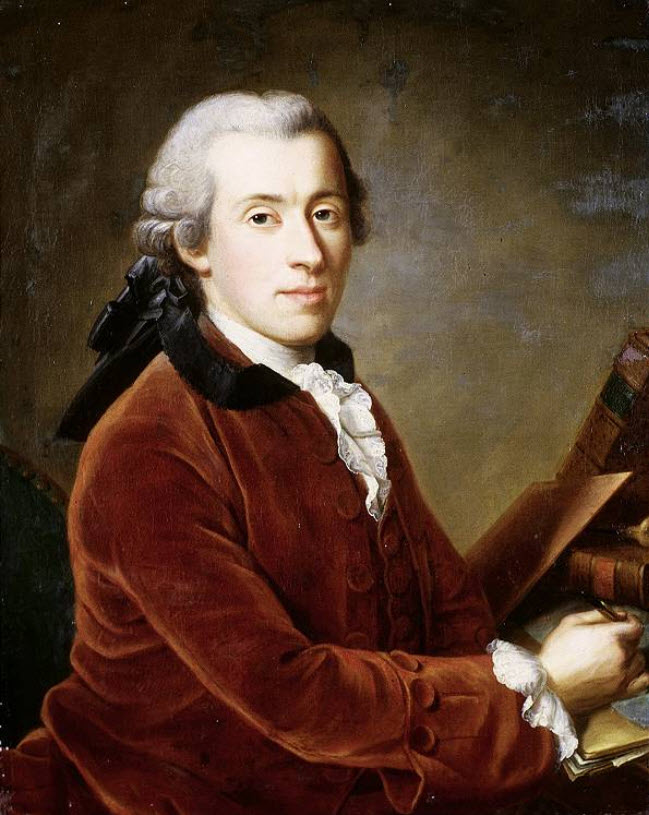
Adrian Zingg, 1767

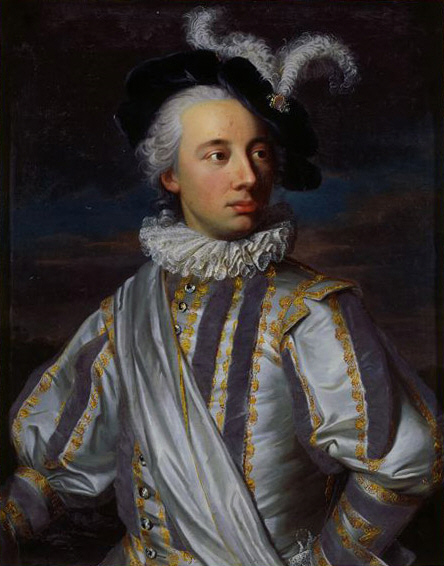
Niklaus Emanuel Tscharner, 1755

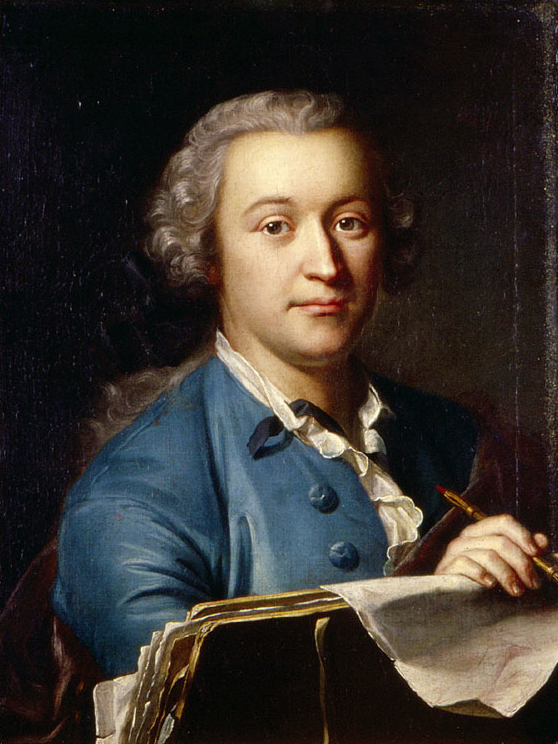
Johann Ludwig Aberli, 1751

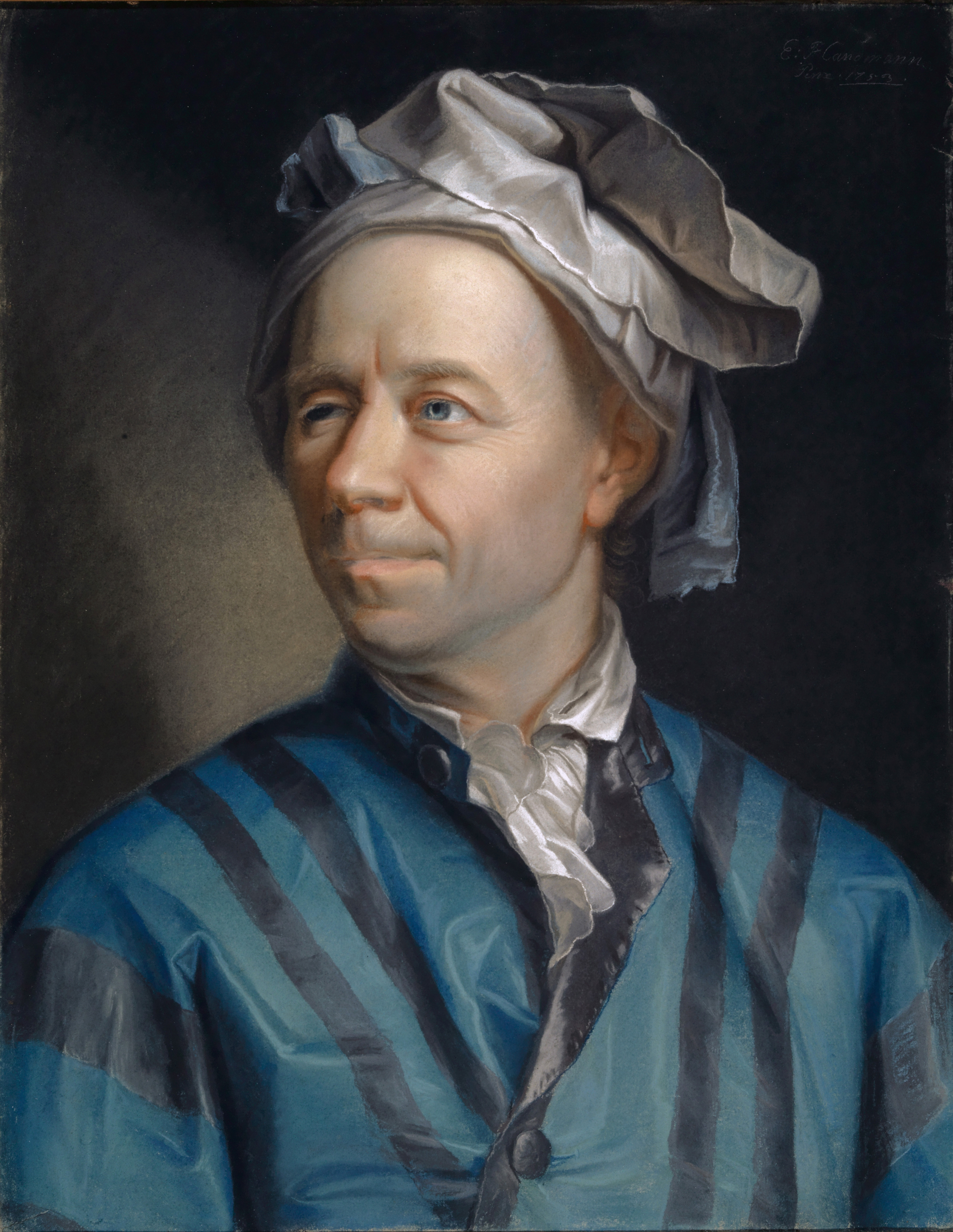
Leonhard Euler, 1753

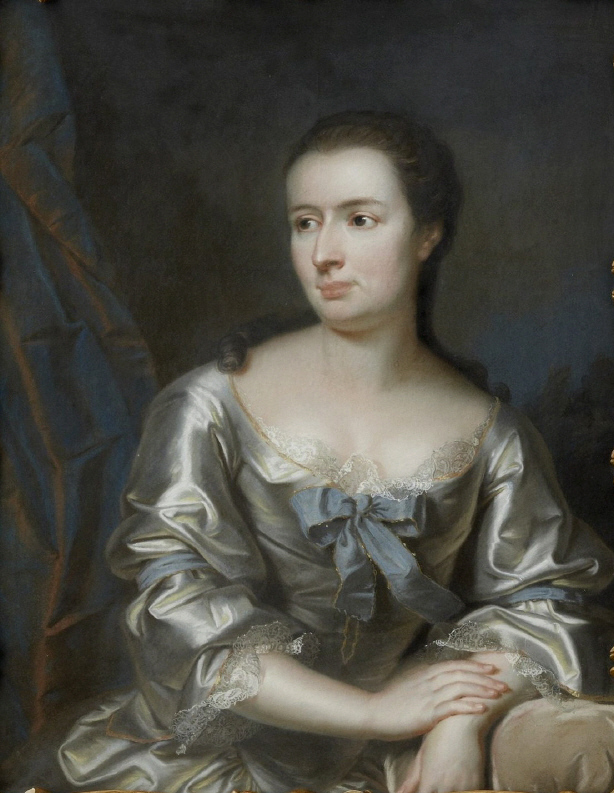
Johanna Margaretha Frisching, 1758
(relative of Franz Rudolf Frisching)

== Bibliography ==
- Thieme-Becker: Allgemeines Lexikon der bildenden Künstler von der Antike bis zur Gegenwart, Leipzig: Seemann, 1907–1950; Taschenbuchausgabe: München: DTV (1992) ISBN 3-423-05908-7
- Thomas Freivogel: Emanuel Handmann 1718–1781 – Ein Basler Porträtist im Bern des ausgehenden Rokoko, Licorne-Verlag (2002) ISBN 3-85654-855-6
- Thomas Freivogel: Emanuel Handmann – beliebtester Porträtist der Familie Tscharner! (online)
- Thomas Freivogel: Zwei Friedrich-Bildnisse von Emanuel Handmann. In: Jürgen Ziechmann (Hrsg.): Fridericianische Miniaturen Bd. 2 (OLDENBURG 1991), S. 189–201
