= Schweizer Laufhund =

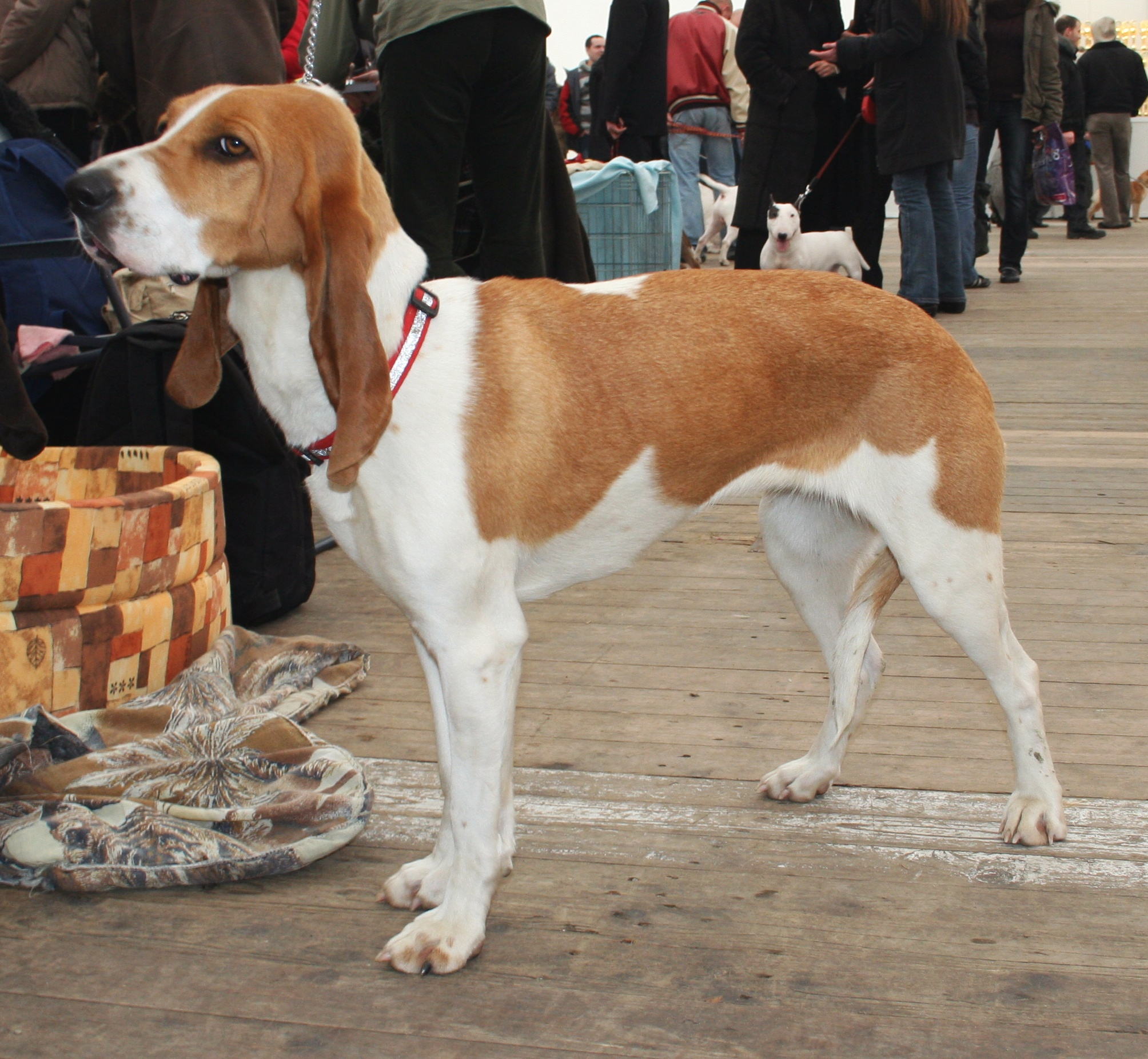
- A Schweizer Laufhund of the Schwyz hound variety
- Other names: Chien Courant Suisse, Swiss Hound, Swiss beagle, Swiss running hound, Swiss walking dog
- Origin: Switzerland
Traits
Height	Males	49–59 centimetres (19–23 in)
	Females	47–57 centimetres (19–22 in)
- Color: red and white
Kennel club standards
- Fédération Cynologique Internationale: standard

The Schweizer Laufhund (German: Schweizer Laufhund, lit. 'Swiss running dog') is a group of overlapping scenthounds, originating in Switzerland. The breed has several different varieties.

== History ==
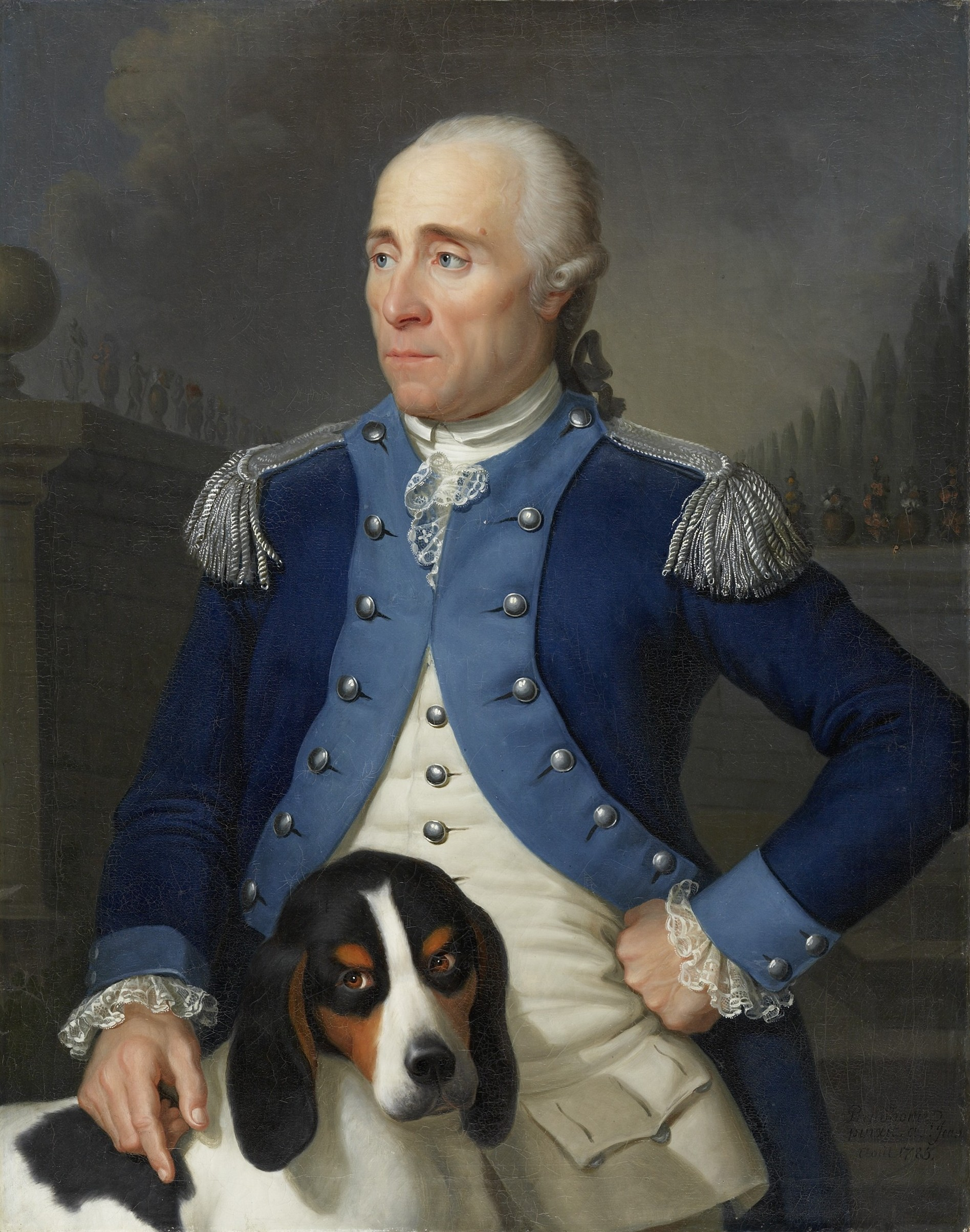
Franz Rudolf Frisching in the uniform of an officer of the Bernese Huntsmen Corps with his Schweizer Laufhund, painted by Jean Preudhomme in 1785

Swiss hounds are known to have existed in Switzerland as early as the first century. They have been found depicted in mosaics stemming from Roman Helvetia in Avenches. Between the 15th and 18th centuries, the dogs gained popularity with French and Italian hunters for their outstanding

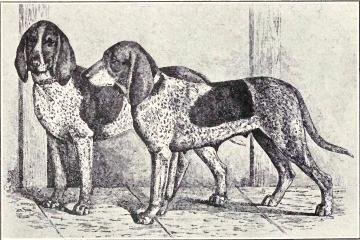
Lucerne Hounds from 1915

predilection for hunting hares. French scenthounds likely influenced the breed's development as Swiss mercenaries returned to their native Switzerland. Prior to the 1880s, they were considered to be a singular, diverse breed, often referred to as Swiss beagles or Swiss walking hounds. However, in 1881, a distinguished Swiss cynologist evaluated numerous examples and determined that there were seven distinct Swiss breeds. A standard was established for five varieties in 1889, including the Bernese Hound, Jura Hound, Lucerne Hound, Schwyz Hound, and the Thurgovie hound. However, by 1933 the hound of Thurgovie had disappeared and it was decided to establish a single standard for the four remaining breeds. However it is still quite prevalent for cynologists to consider them to be separate distinct breeds.

== Description ==
The Schweizer Laufhund is an excellent and independent hunting dog used to find and follow a scent even through difficult ground including hare, roe deer, fox, and sometimes boar. The collective breeds are known by several names including Chien Courant Suisse and Swiss Hound and generally have the same characteristics regardless of type.

=== Appearance ===
Schweizer Laufhunds stands between 49–59 centimetres (19–23 in) in males, and 47–57 centimetres (19–22 in) in females. The general appearance is of a hound similar to the Schweizer Niederlaufhund, who the Schweizer Laufhund is generally considered the progenitor of. The head is noble with a friendly and soft expression and a deep chest. The legs are strong with a robust structure. At a calm pace they carry the tail low; when they run it is a bit lifted. The breed has long, drop ears and a long tail.

The coat should be short, smooth, and dense. Some variations have a wire coat, although it is not preferred.

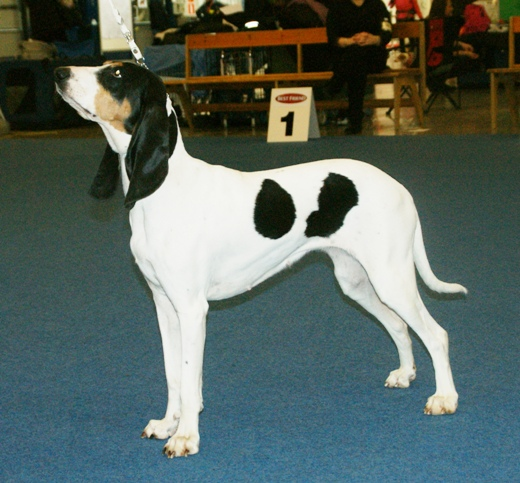
Berner Hound

==== Bernese Hound ====
The Bernese hound is found south of Bern, the capital of Switzerland. It is also called the Berner hound, Bernese scenthound, or Berner Laufhund. It is white, black and tan in color.

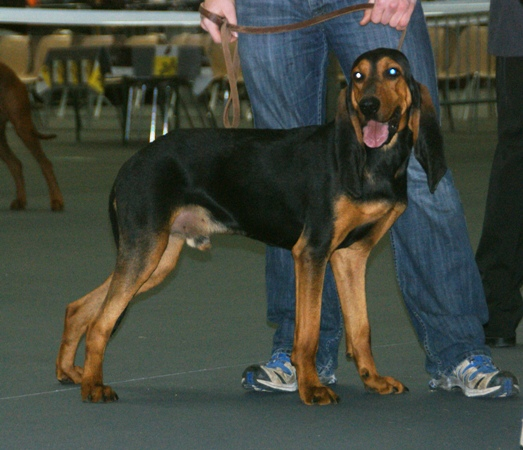
Jura Hound

==== Jura Hound ====
The Jura hound is found along the Jura region along the French-Swiss border and sometimes it is considered to be a French dog. This breed is also known as the Bruno Jura hound. This type usually has a two-tone brown or black and tan.

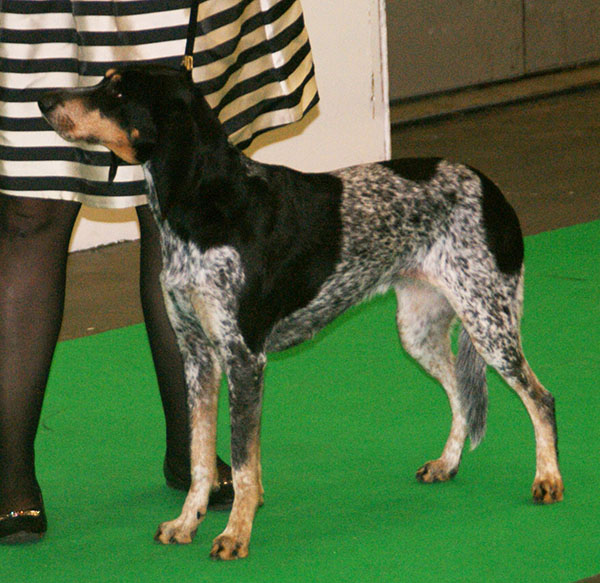
Lucerne Hound

==== Lucerne Hound ====
The Lucerne hound is found in the region around Lucerne. This type may also be known as the Lucernese hound or Luzerner laufhund. It has a smooth, short coat with a “blue” appearance that is a result of a combination of back hairs and white hairs, very heavily speckled; with black patches or black saddle.

==== Schwyz Hound ====
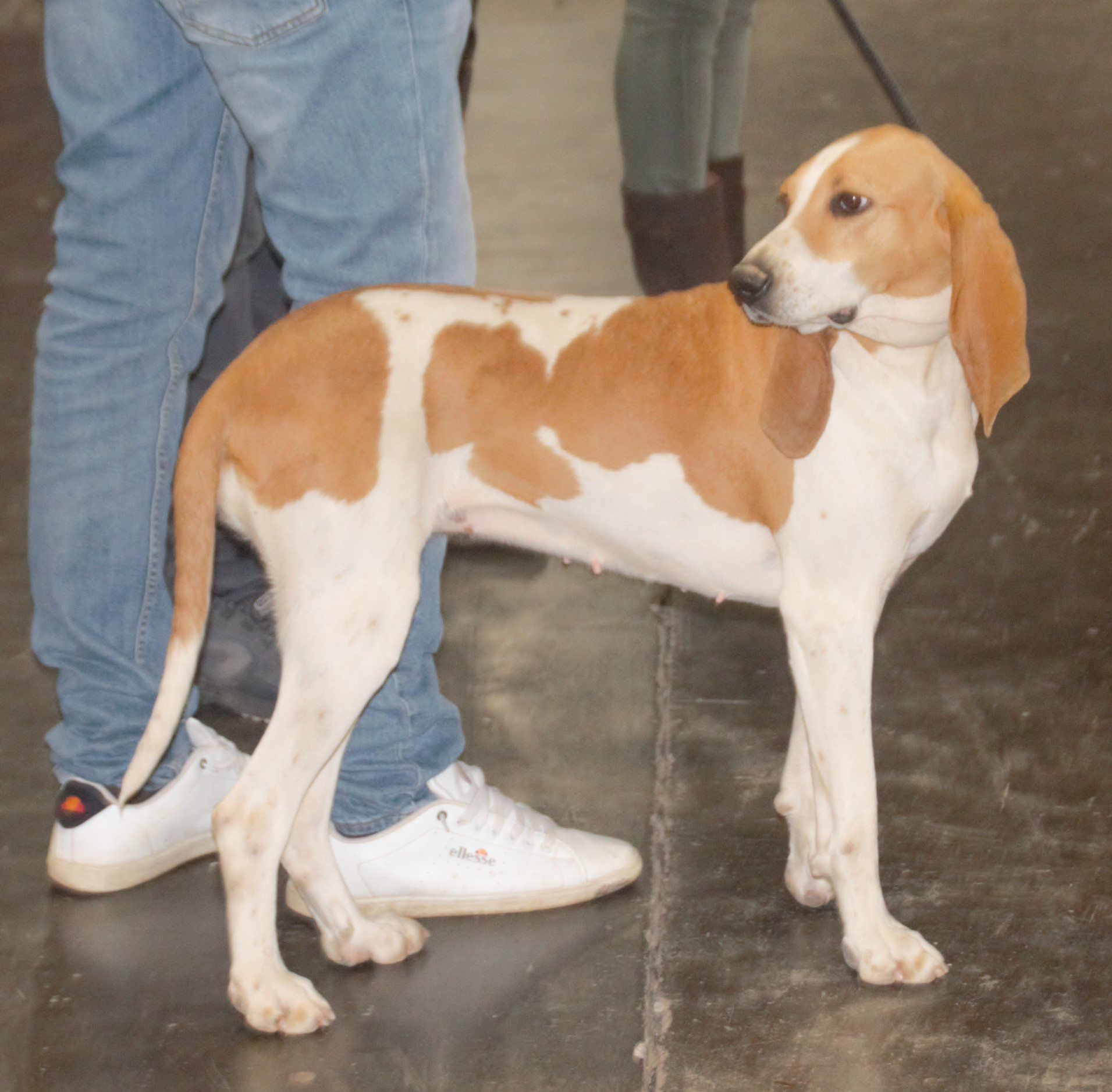
Schwyz Hound

The Schwyz hound is found in the Schwyz region. They may also be called the Schwyzer Laufhund, the Swiss hound, or the Swiss laufhund. This type has a smooth coat in white with reddish-orange colored spots. This variation is quite rare.

=== Temperament ===
The laufhund has a great sense of smell; they are fast, agile, and passionate hunters with great endurance and are able to track various game by scent independently of the hunter.

== See also ==
- List of dog breeds
