= Jäger (infantry) =

German light infantry units

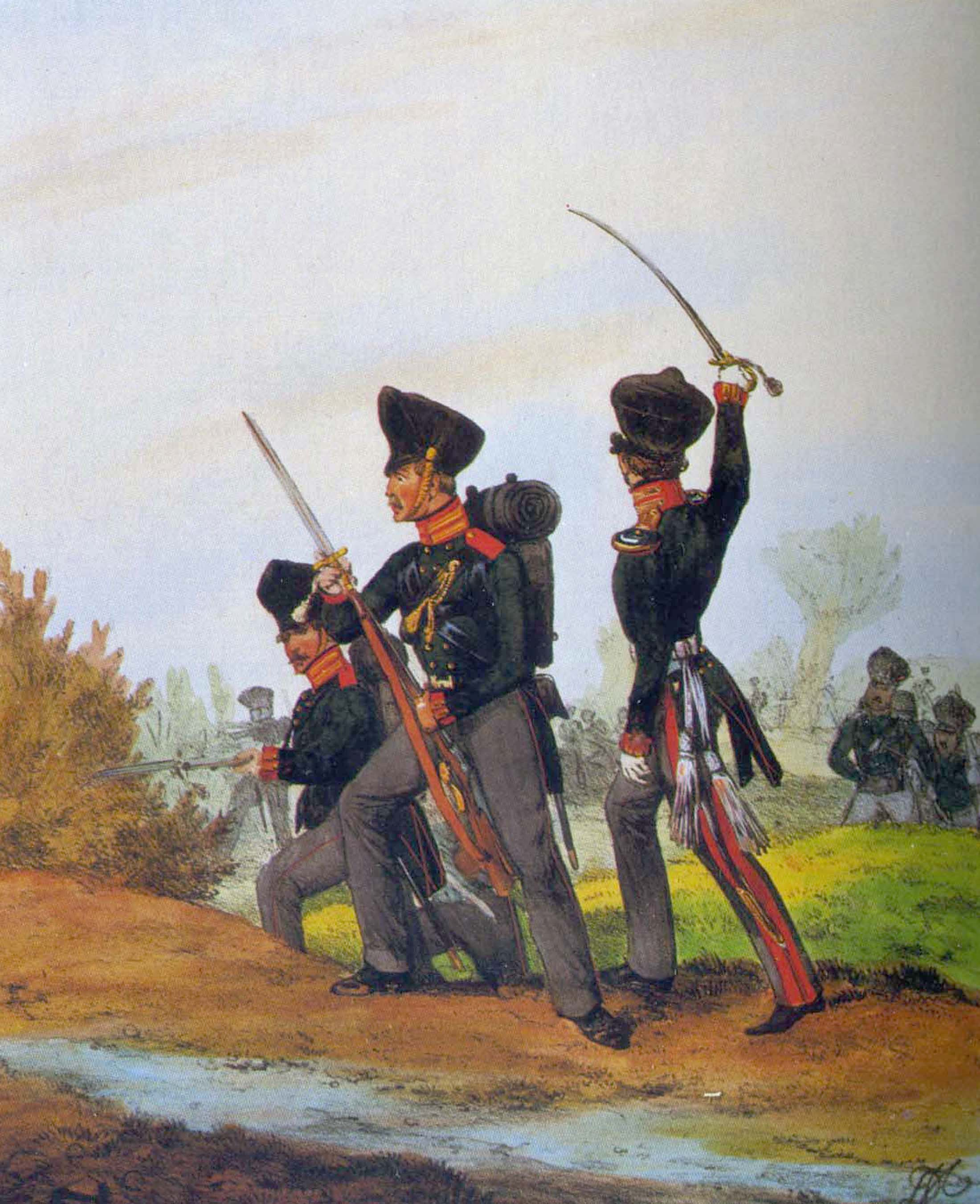
Jägers of the Electorate of Hesse between 1835 and 1843

Jäger (German: [ˈjɛːɡɐ]; German for 'hunter'; sing. [der] Jäger, pl. [die] Jäger) is a German military term referring to specific light infantry units.

In German-speaking states during the early modern era, the term jäger came to denote light infantrymen whose civilian occupations (mostly hunters and foresters) made them well-suited to patrolling and skirmishing independently, rather than as part of a large military unit or traditional line infantry. Jäger was used to describe skirmishers, scouts, sharpshooters and runners.

The word's usage and derivatives broadened, Feldjäger was the name given by the Prussian Army to scouts and runners. In the modern German army (Bundeswehr), Feldjäger is the name given to military police.

Jäger is usually translated into English as:

- "rifleman" (in an infantry role) or "Rifles" (in regimental names); and
- "ranger" (especially in North American English; see below).

In English Jäger is often written as jaeger (both pl. and sgl., which is the alternative German spelling without umlaut) or anglicised as jager (pl. jagers) to avoid the umlaut completely, or rendered phonetically as yeager.

== Age of Enlightenment (18th century) ==
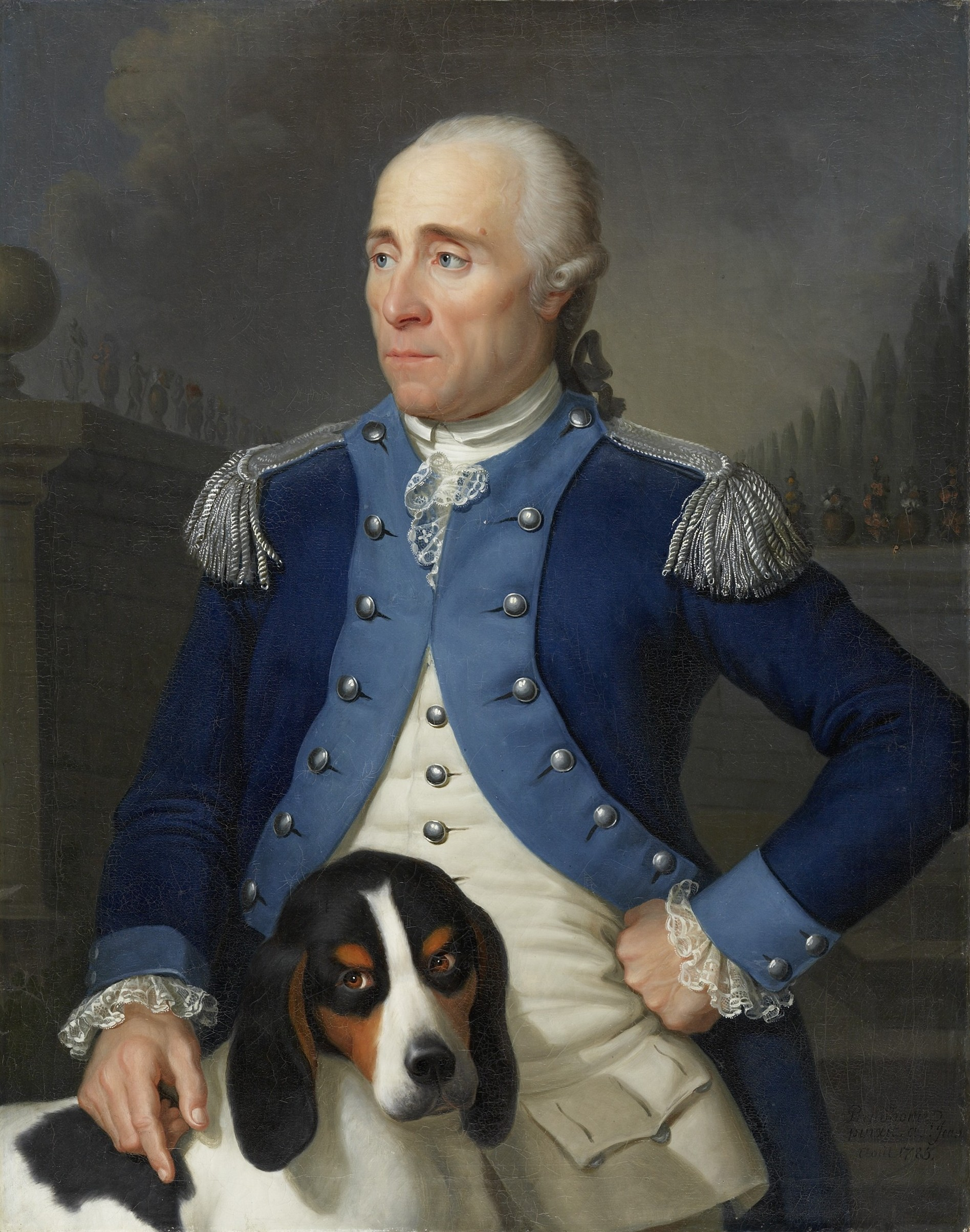
Franz Rudolf Frisching in the uniform of an officer of the Bernese Jäger Corps with his Schweizerischer Niederlaufhund, painted by Jean Preudhomme in 1785

According to a popular theory, the earliest known jäger unit was a company formed in about 1631 in Hesse-Kassel, under William V, Landgrave of Hesse-Kassel. Wilhelm supposedly formed an elite light infantry unit for the Hessian Army, around a core drawn from his personal staff of gamekeepers (revierjäger; "game preserve hunter"), forest rangers and professional hunters.

It was not until the first half of the 18th century that the widespread recruitment began in various German states of gamekeepers, huntsmen and foresters employed on crown estates or those of noble landowners, for specialized units of riflemen and skirmishers.

By the early 19th century, because of their civilian occupations, jäger were usually familiar with the first true rifles, rather than the muskets used by regular infantry. While early long rifles took longer to load than the smoothbore musket of the line infantry, they had greater range and accuracy. The men were drawn from a "well-esteemed class". Jäger became primarily used for reconnaissance, skirmishing or screening bodies of heavier troops.

Prussia, Hesse, the Austrian Empire, the Russian Empire and many smaller states raised jäger-type small units during the Seven Years' War and thereafter. Initially these specialist units were formed for the duration of a particular campaign and thereafter disbanded. Russia maintained its jäger companies on a permanent basis for frontier service against the Ottoman Empire and His Majesty's Lifeguard Jäger Regiment continued in service until 1917.

The Prussian Jäger corps of Frederick the Great dated back to a mounted detachment raised in November 1740 and quickly expanded to two squadrons. Employed in wartime as guides and scouts, they eventually proved a useful frontier guard, catching deserters and seizing contraband. After 1744, they were joined by an infantry branch of foot Jägers, initially divided into independent companies and then brought together as a full regiment by 1784. For fighting at close quarters the Jäger carried a straight-bladed hunting dagger (Hirschfänger), a short sabre or a falchion.

While the English term "ranger" is older, emerging during the 17th century to describe highly-mobile ("ranging") foot and mounted infantry units in British North America, it became strongly associated with Jäger during the late 18th century, when German-speaking Hessian regiments served as part of the British Army in North America.

== Napoleonic era ==
Interest in light infantry tactics increased across Europe after the Battle of Valmy, where the Prussian line infantry proved unable to break through the Tirailleur (French sharpshooters). Initially soldiers were drawn directly from the line infantry to fight as skirmishers instead, but in time many German-speaking states adopted Jäger to fulfil this role. In theory the Jäger operated in pairs to protect each other while reloading, and remained within 100–200 yd (91–183 m) of close-order infantry on which they could fall back if they were endangered by cavalry or driven off by infantry. However, it was admitted that, due to the difficulty of controlling troops spread out in open-order and in the thick of battle, these guidelines might not always be followed. Jäger were allowed to act with a certain amount of initiative on the battlefield, unlike line infantry who were rigidly drilled and kept under tight control by their officers. For this reason, it was the most energetic and daring soldiers who were selected to become a Jäger.

The Prussians in particular developed their light infantry tactics during the early Napoleonic era. There was much disagreement over how much emphasis should be placed on Jägers, though and reform was for the most part at the regimental level by more energetic commanders such as Ludwig Yorck von Wartenburg. It was not until the reorganization of the army led by Gerhard von Scharnhorst that the Jäger corps was strengthened on a national level. Having suffered crippling defeats at Battle of Jena-Auerstedt and the Battle of Lübeck, the Prussian army undertook reforms, in many ways following the example of the French Revolutionary Army, becoming a nationalized force.

Foreign mercenaries were removed, corporal punishment became rare (and was abolished for Jäger troops), and promotions were based on merit rather than nobility. New volunteers from a bourgeois background were organized to resist Napoleon's invasion and occupation of Central Europe. Continuing the earlier traditions, in Prussia these Jäger were patriotic volunteers, bearing the cost of their weapons and uniforms at their own expense or with the help of contributions from friends and neighbours, and often organizing themselves into clubs and leagues. As one of the early adopters of skirmish tactics, Yorck became inspector-general of the light infantry in Prussia and oversaw the increase and improvement of the new Jäger troops during the years of peace after the Treaty of Tilsit. The most famous of the Prussian Jäger were the volunteers of the Lützow Free Corps.

The Prussian army gained experience as an auxiliary force in the French invasion of Russia, where the Jäger were often used on the strategic level to provide support and cover for the rest of the army. They managed to escape the fate of Napoleon's French soldiers after Yorck negotiated the Convention of Tauroggen a battlefield truce with Russia when, during a rear-guard action, the French withdrew and left Yorck's troops isolated.

=== German campaigns 1813 to 1815 ===
In the War of the Sixth Coalition that immediately followed, the Jäger of the various armies performed well against Napoleon's forces, and Prussian Jäger played a significant role in the battles of the Waterloo campaign, holding off Grouchy's corps at the Battle of Wavre.

The resistance against Napoleon exacted a high toll of military casualties, officers in particular. This in combination with a shift towards a meritocratic officer corps led to many promotions within the ranks. By the end of the Napoleonic Wars, many of the junior officers in the Germanic states' armies were former Jäger soldiers who had been promoted through the ranks.

== Prior to First World War ==
By the early twentieth century, Jäger units were part of the Imperial German, Austro-Hungarian, Swedish, Dutch and Norwegian armies. They corresponded to the rifles, light infantry, chasseurs à pied or bersaglieri units of the British, French, Italian and other armies. While such units still enjoyed considerable prestige and high esprit de corps, their training, equipment and tactical roles had for the most part become aligned with those of the line infantry of their respective armies.

=== Jäger rank ===
Jäger was in Austria and Germany until 1918 the lowest rank of the Jäger regiments, equivalent to private or soldier. Other follows Gemeiner private ranks - Musketier (musketeer), Grenadier, Füsilier (fusilier), Infanterist (infantryman), Dragoner (en: dragoon), Husar (hussar), Ulan (uhlan), Kanonier, (gunner), Pionier (pioneer), Sanitäter (combat medic), Trainsoldat (trainman)

=== Imperial Germany ===
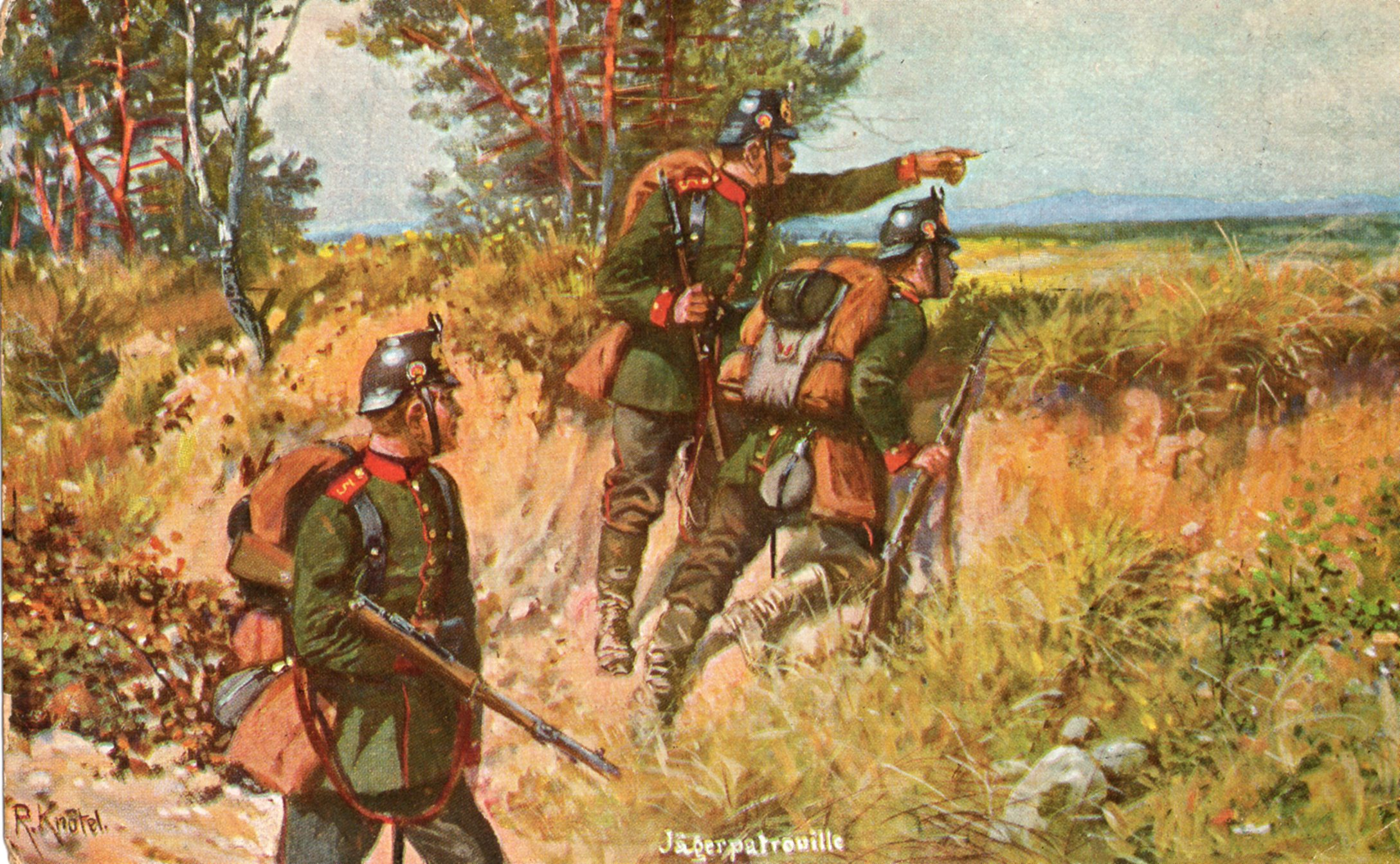
Jägerpatrouille, painting by Richard Knötel (1910)

Best known were the German Jäger units who were distinguished by their peace-time wear of dark green tunics and shakos (in contrast to the dark blue tunics and spiked helmets of most German infantry). In the peacetime Prussian Army, the main component of the Imperial German Army, there were one Imperial Guard Jäger battalion, the Garde-Jäger-Bataillon, and twelve Jäger battalions of the line. One Jäger battalion, the Großherzoglich Mecklenburgisches Jäger-Bataillon Nr. 14, was from the Grand Duchy of Mecklenburg-Schwerin. Another, Westfälisches Jäger-Bataillon Nr. 7, known as the "Bückeburg Jägers", was raised in the Principality of Schaumburg-Lippe, whose capital was Bückeburg. The other ten were from Prussian lands. Another Prussian Guard unit, the Guards Rifles Battalion, though not designated Jäger, was a Jäger formation. Its origins were in a French chasseur battalion of the Napoleonic era, and its troops wore the shako and green tunic of the Jäger battalions.

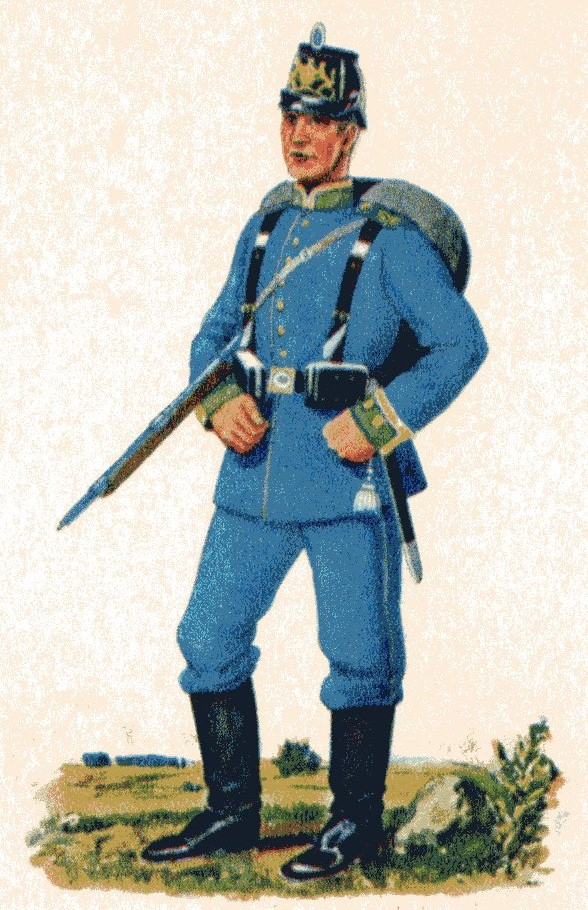
Royal Bavarian Jäger Battalion No. 2 Aschaffenburg. Oberjäger, field marching order, around 1910

The army of the Kingdom of Saxony added two Jäger battalions, which were included in the Imperial German Army order of battle as Kgl. Sächsisches 1. Jäger-Bataillon Nr. 12 and Kgl. Sächsisches 2. Jäger-Bataillon Nr. 13. The Saxon Jäger had a number of dress distinctions – notably tunics of a darker green than the Prussian colour, black facings instead of red and a black buffalo-hair plume buckled to the side of the shako. The autonomous Royal Bavarian Army provided a further two Jäger battalions, Kgl. Bayerisches 1. Jäger-Bataillon and Kgl. Bayerisches 2. Jäger-Bataillon, who wore the light blue of Bavarian infantry with green facings.

On mobilization in August 1914, each of these Prussian, Saxon and Bavarian Jäger battalions raised a reserve Jäger battalion. In September 1914, an additional twelve reserve Jäger battalions were raised, ten Prussian and two Saxon. In May 1915, the German Army began joining the Jäger battalions to form Jäger regiments, and in late 1917, the Deutsche Jäger-Division was formed.

During the early stages of World War I, the German Jäger maintained their traditional role as skirmishers and scouts, often in conjunction with cavalry units. With the advent of trench warfare, they were committed to an ordinary infantry role, integrated into divisions and lost their status as independent units. Cyclist Jäger served in the Balkan and Russian theatres of war, while Württemberg and Bavaria raised Ski-Jäger during the winter of 1914–1915. Another specialist formation was the Jäger Storm Companies, serving as trench raiders during 1917–1918.

==== Mounted Jäger ====
In 1897, existing dispatch rider units within the Prussian Army were converted to Detachments Jäger' zu Pferde. Further mounted Jäger squadrons were subsequently raised, including short-lived Bavarian and Saxon detachments. After 1901, the original dispatch carrying role of the mounted Jäger was discontinued. Five newly raised squadrons were brought together to form a combined Mounted Jäger Regiment the same year. The experiment proved a successful one and between 1905 and 1913 a further 13 mounted Jäger regiments were created.

=== Austria-Hungary ===
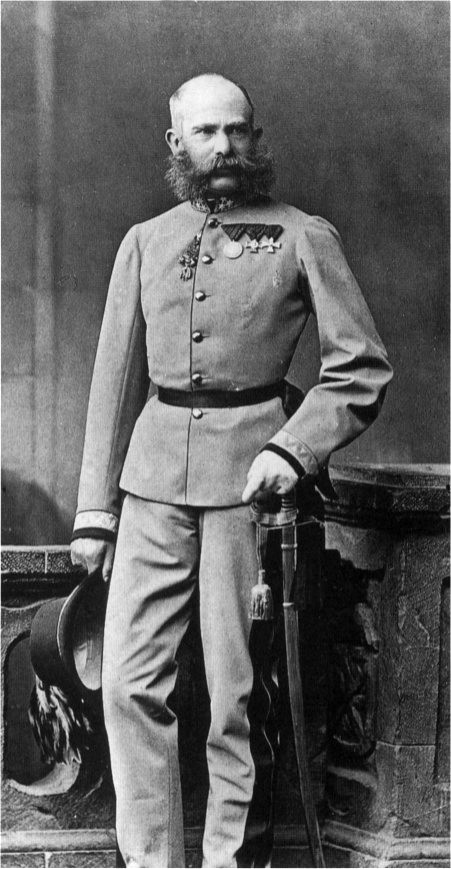
Emperor Franz Joseph I in the parade dress of the Kaiserjäger 1879

The Austro-Hungarian Army in 1914 included four regiments of Tiroler Kaiserjäger, descended from a unit first raised in 1801. There were also 29 battalions of Feldjäger recruited from different regions across the Empire (including 7 Hungarian, 5 Bohemian and 4 Galician battalions) and one Bosnian-Herzegovinian Feldjäger Battalion (Bosnisch-hercegovinisches Feldjägerbataillon). All wore pike grey uniforms faced in green, with a form of bowler hat carrying a distinctive plume of dark green feathers. The exception was the Bosnian-Herzegovinian Feldjäger Battalion which wore the fez. Later, an additional three Feldjäger battalions and seven Bosnian-Herzegovinian Feldjäger Battalions were formed.

== Second World War Germany ==
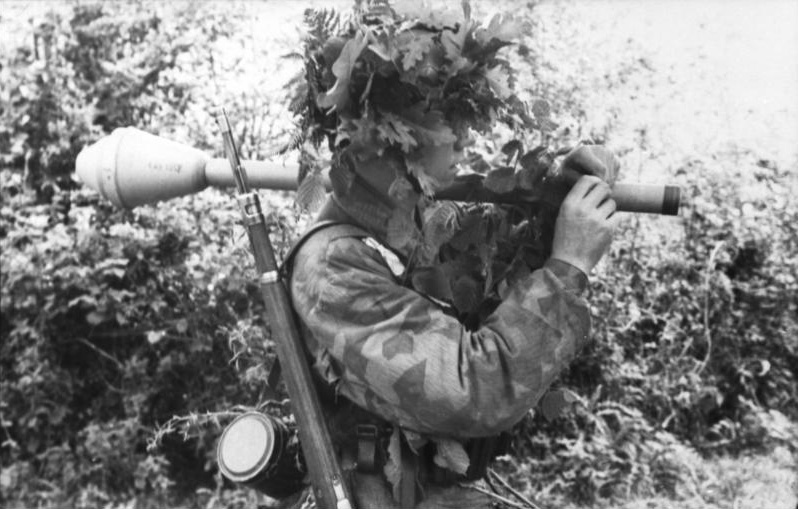
German Fallschirmjäger (paratroopers) in Normandy June 1944, wearing camouflage smocks and armed with a panzerfaust

After the First World War, the Jäger units of the Imperial German Army were disbanded, but their traditions were carried by infantry regiments of the 100,000-man Reichswehr of the Weimar Republic. After the Nazis came to power in 1933 and the rearmament of Germany began, the new Wehrmacht revived the name Jäger for various types of units:

- In 1935, the first specialized mountain infantry units were formed; their regiments and battalions were designated Gebirgsjäger ("mountain infantry" – Gebirge is German for "mountain range"). More specialized units, such as the Hochgebirgs-Jäger-Bataillone, for use in high-Alpine conditions, were also developed. The Waffen SS raised a "Karstjäger" Division.
- When the Luftwaffe began forming parachute units in the late-1930s, the first parachute regiment was designated Fallschirm-Jäger-Regiment 1. German paratroopers became known as Fallschirmjäger (Fallschirm is German for "parachute"). At first, Fallschirmjäger was applied only to genuine airborne-qualified troops, but the term was retained for Fallschirmjäger regiments and divisions even after they began operating as regular infantry. A number of Luftwaffen Feld-Divisionen ("field divisions"), regular ground combat units raised by the Luftwaffe, also used the term Luftwaffen-Jäger-Regiment for their infantry regiments. Many of these were later taken over by the army and retained the name Jäger-Regiment.
- Two Skijäger regiments were formed in 1943 as part of Skijäger-Brigade (later a Skijäger-Division).
- Certain infantry divisions were raised as "light infantry divisions" (leichte Infanterie-Divisionen) in late 1940. They were raised to operate in rough terrain, especially in southeastern Europe. Their infantry regiments were called Jäger-Regimenter, and in 1942 the light and light infantry divisions were renamed Jäger divisions.
- The antitank units of German divisions, originally called Panzer-Abwehr-Abteilungen ("anti-tank battalions"), began in 1940 to be redesignated as Panzerjäger-Abteilungen, (literally "tank hunter battalions"). These were equipped with towed or self-propelled guns (often the ad hoc mounting of an antitank gun on a captured or obsolete tank chassis). As the war progressed, some Panzerjäger-Abteilungen were fully equipped with specialized tank destroyers, initially known as Panzerjäger (tank hunters), and later by 1943 as Jagdpanzer ("hunting tank") with enclosed, armored casemate superstructures.
- The military police of the Wehrmacht was known as the Feldgendarmerie. In December 1943, a new force of military police, directly subordinated to the Armed Forces High Command, was formed. Its units were designated Feldjäger-Kommandos with subordinated Feldjäger battalions and regiments. These were known collectively as the Feldjägerkorps. The name was taken from the Reitendes Feldjägerkorps, a Prussian Army military police-type unit directly under the General Staff.
- The 24th Waffen Mountain Division of the SS was known as Karstjäger ("Karst Riflemen").

== After Second World War ==
=== Germany ===
Jäger (short: Jg; English: hunter) is the lowest soldier rank of enlisted men of the modern day's German Bundeswehr for soldiers belonging to the light infantry, paratroopers and mountain troops. It is grouped as OR1) in NATO, and might be comparable to Private (rank) in the United States Army as well as British Army, or to other Anglophone armed forces.

Reflecting military tradition, in German speaking armed forces there are a number of OR1-rank descriptions – including "Jäger" – used as the lowest rank of an individual soldier. These may vary according to the service branch (Heer, Luftwaffe, Bundeswehr, medical service etc.). Other examples are Grenadier for mechanized infantrymen and Kanonier for artillerymen.

The German Bundeswehr rejected the term Feldgendarmerie and instead kept the term Feldjäger for its military police units. To emphasize the traditional connection with the Prussian Reitendes Feldjägerkorps, rather than the Wehrmacht military police units, the Feldjäger of the Bundeswehr wear a red beret with star badge (the Gardestern) of the Order of the Black Eagle, Prussia's highest chivalric order. The Reitendes Feldjägerkorps had been granted the right to wear the Gardestern in 1847.

In addition, at certain periods, light infantry units of the Bundeswehr were designated as Jäger, and wore a green beret with a beret badge patterned after the Jäger sleeve patch of the Wehrmacht Jäger units. Each battalion of Jäger, Fallschirmjäger and Gebirgsjäger, has a "heavy company" of Wiesel weapon-carriers equipped with 20 mm cannon, TOW launchers or 120 mm mortars.

The modern Jäger-type infantry units are distinguished as follows:

- Jäger – light infantry specialized for assault and defense operations in urban and rugged terrain, often equivalent to mechanised infantry, but using APCs rather than Infantry Fighting Vehicles. Capabilities also include raiding patrols and Jagdkampf, a special operations tactic for platoon-sized deployments primarily behind FLET (Forward Line of Enemy Troops) and to hunt down smaller enemy detachments (e.g. SOF) behind the own lines. They can also be deployed in air-mobile/air-assault operations (heliborne). They wear a green beret with a golden badge displaying oak leaves surrounded by a braided chord.
- Fallschirmjäger – "Airborne Rangers" – paratroopers, light airborne infantry units. As above. They wear a Bordeaux beret with a badge displaying an attacking eagle.
- Gebirgsjäger – "Mountain Rangers" – light infantry for mountain terrain, rugged and urban terrain, with special equipment for winter warfare. Instead of a beret, they wear a grey Bergmütze mountain cap - a type of stiff forage cap – see Bergmütze (German)) with Edelweiss insignia.
- Soldiers in the Wachbataillon (Guard battalion at the Ministry of Defence) are called Grenadier.

With a former restructuring of the German Army, only one new air-mobile regiment, Jägerregiment 1 (JgRgt 1), two battalions, Jägerbataillon 291 (JgBtl 291) and Jägerbataillon 292 (JgBtl 292) (both battalions are part of the Franco-German Brigade) and two other new bataillons of the mechanised brigades are the only regular Jäger retained. On the other hand, Fallschirmjäger has become the most important infantry type, due to its versatility and the nature of modern-day peacekeeping missions abroad.

With the last restructuring of the German Army, Jägerregiment 1 was reduced to Jägerbataillon 1 (JgBtl 1), not air-mobile any longer. Two new battalions were established: Jägerbataillon 91 and Jägerbataillon 413.

=== Austria ===
In the Austrian Bundesheer, ″Jäger″ is the official military technical term for infantry units (contrary to mechanized infantry being designated as Panzergrenadiers similar to corresponding German Bundeswehr and Swiss Armed Forces units). In addition, the Austrian Army's special forces unit which was established in 1963 is called ″Jagdkommando″.

=== Denmark ===
In August 1788, the Hessian Johann Ewald was hired to form a jagercorp in Sleswig. He had seen plenty of combat in North America as the commander of both mounted jägers and jägers on foot. From then on until the late 1850s the Danish army had a number of jagercorps, battalion-sized light infantry units mainly armed with rifles.

Under the army law of 1842 a total of five out of 23 battalions of infantry were jägers. By 1860 all five had been converted to ordinary infantry as the 18th-22nd Battalions, since all infantry were now armed with rifles and were trained to fight in heavy skirmish lines as the main way of fighting. This change ended a specific jäger tradition in the Danish army.

In the modern day Danish army, Jæger is used for the special forces unit Jægerkorpset (Jaeger Corps). In 2019, the 13th Light Infantry Battalion was created at the Haderslev garrison as the only regular light infantry unit in the army as part of the reborn Slesviske Fodregiment.

=== Lithuania ===
In present-day Lithuania the Vytautas the Great Jäger Battalion (Lithianian: Vytauto Didžiojo jėgerių batalionas) forms part of the Lithuanian Special Operations Force.

=== Finland ===
==== Jäger as rank ====
Jääkäri / jägare (Finnish / Swedish word for "jäger") is the lowest rank (private) in peacetime infantry formations (in wartime Finnish Army all jägers serve in the operative forces while 'regular' infantry typically consisting of older reservists is split between regional and local forces) of the Finnish Army and in the marines of the Nyland Brigade (part of the Finnish Navy). In the Finnish Border Guards, the private rank is called rajajääkäri ("border jäger").

The rank pays homage to the role of the World War I era Jäger Movement in securing Finnish Independence.

Besides riflemen, specialists such as drivers, medics, military police and mortar squad members in the above-mentioned infantry formations usually hold the rank of jäger. The rank-and-file mortar crew members in regional and local forces hold the rank of Private as mortar crews are seen as part of infantry rather than artillery. They use the green background of infantry/jägers on their unit insignia while the forward observers directing their fire, though viewed as part of infantry, use the red of artillery. In units other than infantry, equivalent ranks such as tykkimies ("gunner") or viestimies ("signalist") are used (see Finnish military ranks). In all other Navy units except the Uusimaa Brigade, the private rank is matruusi ("sailor").

The old infantry rank of sotamies ("private", lit. "soldier") is no longer used in peacetime training units, but remains reserved for war-time regular infantry usage as opposed to "jääkäri" used by light and/or specialized infantry.

==== Jäger as troop type indicator ====
The word jäger is also used to indicate a) in general the best trained and equipped combat arms troops of the Defence Forces and b) specifically for the following troops.

Finnish Army

- Jääkärijoukot ("Jäger Troops") – refers to any 1st line infantry units with top-of-the-line equipment
- Panssarijääkärit ("Armoured or Panzer Jägers") — mechanized infantry of the Armoured Brigade
- Kaartinjääkärit ("Guards Jägers") — infantry of the Guard Jaeger Regiment, specializing in urban warfare
- Laskuvarjojääkärit ("Parachute Jägers") — rangers / paratroopers of the Utti Jäger Regt (conscripts)
- Erikoisjääkärit ("Special Jägers") — the Army's Special Forces, part of the Utti Jäger Regt (career military)

Finnish Navy

- Rannikkojääkärit ("Coastal Jägers") — marines of the Uusimaa Brigade

Border Guards

- Rajajääkärit ("Border Jägers") — rangers / light infantry of the Border Guard
- Erikoisrajajääkärit ("Special Border Jägers") — special operations capable forces within the Border Guard

In addition to the above, some non-infantry units (such as Jääkäritykistörykmentti (JTR), "Jäger Artillery Regiment", formerly Jääkäripatteristo (JPsto), "Jäger Artillery Battalion" & the defunct Hämeen Ratsujääkäripataljoona (HämRjP), "Häme Mounted Jäger Battalion"-) use the word jäger in their name to show direct lineage to the original Jäger Movement.

=== Norway ===
Jeger is the general term indicating highly trained soldiers and operators capable of conducting military ISTAR (intelligence, surveillance, target acquisition, reconnaissance) operations independently behind enemy lines. There are several units using the jeger term, both conventional forces and special operation forces.

==== SOF units ====
Within the Norwegian Armed Forces there are two special operations forces with the jeger name. The commando name refers to the Norwegian specialised forces from World War 2 like Norwegian Independent Company 1.

- Marinejegerkommandoen (Naval Special Operations Commando) – the SOF operators are referred to as Marinejeger (Navy Ranger) or Spesialbåtoperatør (Special Boat Operator) and is highly trained in naval SOF and ISTAR operations.
- Forsvarets Spesialkommando (Special Operations Commando) – this unit's operators are referred to as Spesialjeger (Special Ranger) – SOF operators trained highly for airborne SOF and ISTAR.

==== Specialised jeger units ====
In the Norwegian Armed Forces, there are several jeger units of troop and company size, who fill the criteria as special operations, but are not designated as such by the Norwegian military. These units are a mix composed of professional soldiers and conscripts. The units also consists of JTAC operators.

- The Coastal Ranger Commando (Norwegian: Kystjegerkommandoen) – operators are referred to as coastal rangers (Norwegian: kystjeger) and are highly trained in conducting direct action, raids, ship-boarding and naval ISTAR operations along the Norwegian shorelines.
- The Long Range Recconnaissance Squadron (Norwegian: Fjernoppklaringseskadronen) – the operators are referred to as field operators (Norwegian: feltoperatør) and bear exactly the same status as a jeger. This unit is highly trained in conducting ISTAR and special reconnaissance operations far behind enemy lines.
- The Artillery Battalion (Norwegian: Artilleribataljonen) – the operators are referred to as artillery rangers (Norwegian: artillerijeger) and are highly trained to conduct ISTAR missions mainly to support the artillery battalion with information, locations and fire missions regarding high valued artillery targets.
- Fallskjermjegertroppen (paratrooper platoon) - The Armed Forces Special Commands training wing has a platoon consisting of conscripts highly trained for raid and airborne ISTAR operations.
- The Ranger Platoon (Norwegian: Jegertroppen) – The Norwegian Special Operations Commando (NORSOC) has a unit consisting of female conscripts only, highly trained for urban ISTAR operations.

==== Conventional jeger units ====
The armed forces includes ranger troops providing ISTAR for their own units.

- Ranger Battalion GSV (Norwegian: Jegerbataljonen GSV) – an infantry battalion consisting of conscripts trained as border rangers (Norwegian: grensejeger) in order to maintain surveillance along the Norway–Russia border.
- Home Guard - ISTAR/ranger units in each regional district.
- The Royal Guards light armoured reconnaissance platoon.

=== Sweden ===
Swedish "jägare" are troops such as commandos or light infantry. The former now consist of:

- Parachute Airborne Rangers – fallskärmsjägare (lit. "parachute rangers")
- Marine commandos of the Swedish Amphibious Corps – kustjägare (lit. "coastal rangers")
- Rangers of the Army Ranger Battalion, airborne rangers of the Life Regiment Hussars (same regiment as Fallskärmsjägarna), the Swedish Air Force's outer-perimeter patrols Flygbasjägarna (lit. "airbase rangers") and the Military Police units for urban warfare from the Life Guards.

Historically, the first units to be named "jägare" were infantry and cavalry units stationed in the sparsely populated border province of Jämtland: Jämtlands hästjägarkår in 1834 and Jämtlands fältjägarkår from 1853.

After World War II, the Army Ranger School, later Lapplands jägarregemente, was formed in Kiruna. In the following years, the then cavalry regiments mainly developed into either ranger regiments (K 3 and K 4) or into tank regiments.

=== Netherlands ===
After the Napoleonic period, the Jager Battalions were incorporated into the line infantry and disappeared as such (except for the Colonial Jager units destined for the West Indies). Their role was taken over by the flank companies of each battalion, one of every four battalions in an 'Afdeeling' or Regiment was designated a Flank Battalion (Light Infantry).

In 1829, a new Royal Guard was raised, which included a Grenadier Regiment and a Jager Battalion. These were immediately sent into action during the Belgian Secession (1830–1832). During that war, voluntary units like Van Dams' Jagers and several Voluntary Student Companies, were dressed and equipped as Jagers, including a mounted Jager detachment; after the war, these voluntary units were disbanded.

In 1995, after a long history as separate units, the Guard Grenadiers and Jagers were united into the Grenadiers' and Rifles Guard Regiment.

In 1950, several Infantry Regiments were disbanded; their traditions were transferred to a new regiment, which was located and closely tied to Limburg Province. Since it took over the traditions of the Jager Contingent of the German Confederation, which was provided by Limburg Province, the Regiment was called the Limburgse Jagers and adopted the French horn in their emblem. Currently the active troops of this infantry regiment are located in Oirschot, just outside their home province in North Brabant, but close ties to the province remain.

=== Ukraine ===
As of December 2022, the Ukrainian armed forces had three Jaeger brigades, each with around 2,000 servicemen, the 13th, 68th, and the 71st Jaeger Brigade. They are likely forest-specialized infantry forces, with the 71st also doubles as airmobile infantry.

The first of the Jaeger Brigades, the 61st, which was activated in 2016 as motorized infantry under the 4th Reserve Corps, was transformed into a mechanized infantry brigade in 2022.

== See also ==
- Bersaglieri
- Caçadores
- Imperial-Royal Mountain Troops (Austria-Hungary)
- List of Jäger units
- Schützen (military)
- Vânători (military unit)
- Pandur
- Hajduk
- Uskoks
- Šajkaši
- Grenz infantry
- Military Frontier
