= Johann Jakob Schalch =

Swiss painter

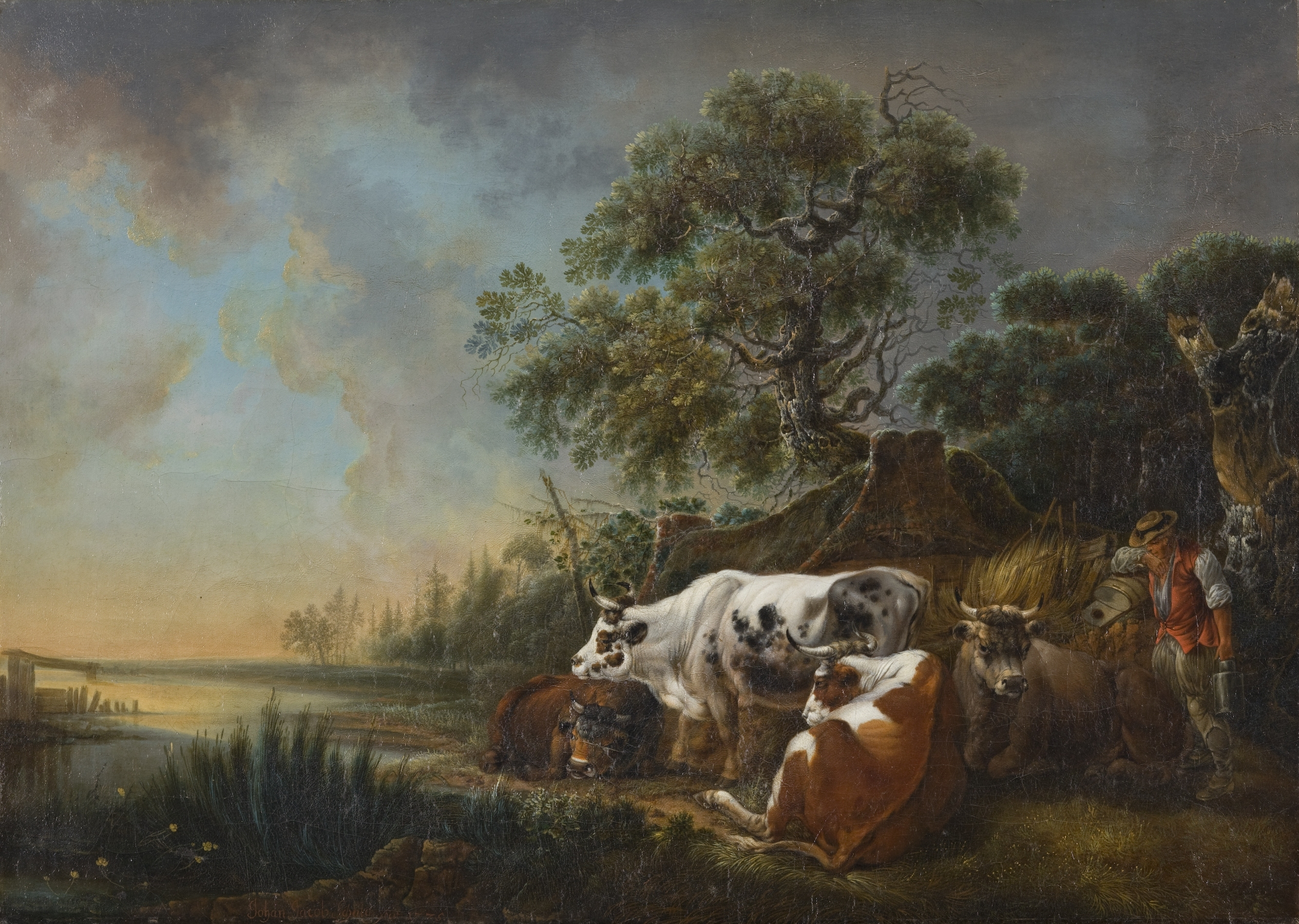
- Farmer with cows at a river bank (1775)
- Born: 23 January 1723; Schaffhausen, Switzerland
- Died: 21 August 1789 (aged 66); Schaffhausen
- Known for: Painting

Johann Jakob Schalch (23 January 1723 – 21 August 1789) was a Swiss painter. He was a contemporary of the Swiss painters Anton Graff, Jean Preudhomme, Angelica Kauffman, Jakob Emanuel Handmann, Johann Caspar Füssli. His son Johann Heinrich Füssli was also a noted painter.

== History ==
Johann Jakob Schalch was born in Schaffhausen, Switzerland. He studied under the painter and stucco plasterer Johann Ulrich Schnetzler in Schaffhausen, and later under the animal painter Karl Wilhelm de Hamilton in Augsburg. As a young man Schalch made study trips to Germany and France. He married Maria Oechslin in Schaffhausen in 1750.

In 1754 Schalch moved to London, where he soon met and received commissions to paint for members of the Royal Court. He specialized in landscaping and animal painting; several of his works are now in the Royal Collection, including The gardens at Kew and The White House, Kew.

In 1763 Schalch moved to Holland, where he painted the English Ambassador in The Hague. The painting depicts Ambassador York astride a horse. This painting was his breakthrough and is regarded as his masterpiece.

In 1773 Schalch returned to his hometown, Schaffhausen, he remained for the rest of his life. He died at his residence, in the countryside known as 'the Durstgraben' (near his beloved Rheinfall) in 1789. He had been nearly blind during his last years.

== Paintings ==
Schalch was noted for his paintings of the Rheinfall in Schaffhausen, many of which were reproduced as engravings, making his name well-known.

The Museum zu Allerheiligen in Schaffhausen owns the largest collection of Schalch paintings and drawings.

== Literature and references ==
- Museum zu Allerheiligen, Schaffhausen
- Carl Brun: Schweizer Künstlerlexikon. Bd. 3 (1913), S. 25 f
- Johann Caspar Füssli: Geschichte der besten Künstler in der Schweiz. Bd. 4, Zürich 1779, S. 154–158
- H. van Hall: Portraits of Dutch painters and other artists of the Low Countries. Amsterdam 1963
- Royal Collection
