= Anna Füssli =

Swiss painter

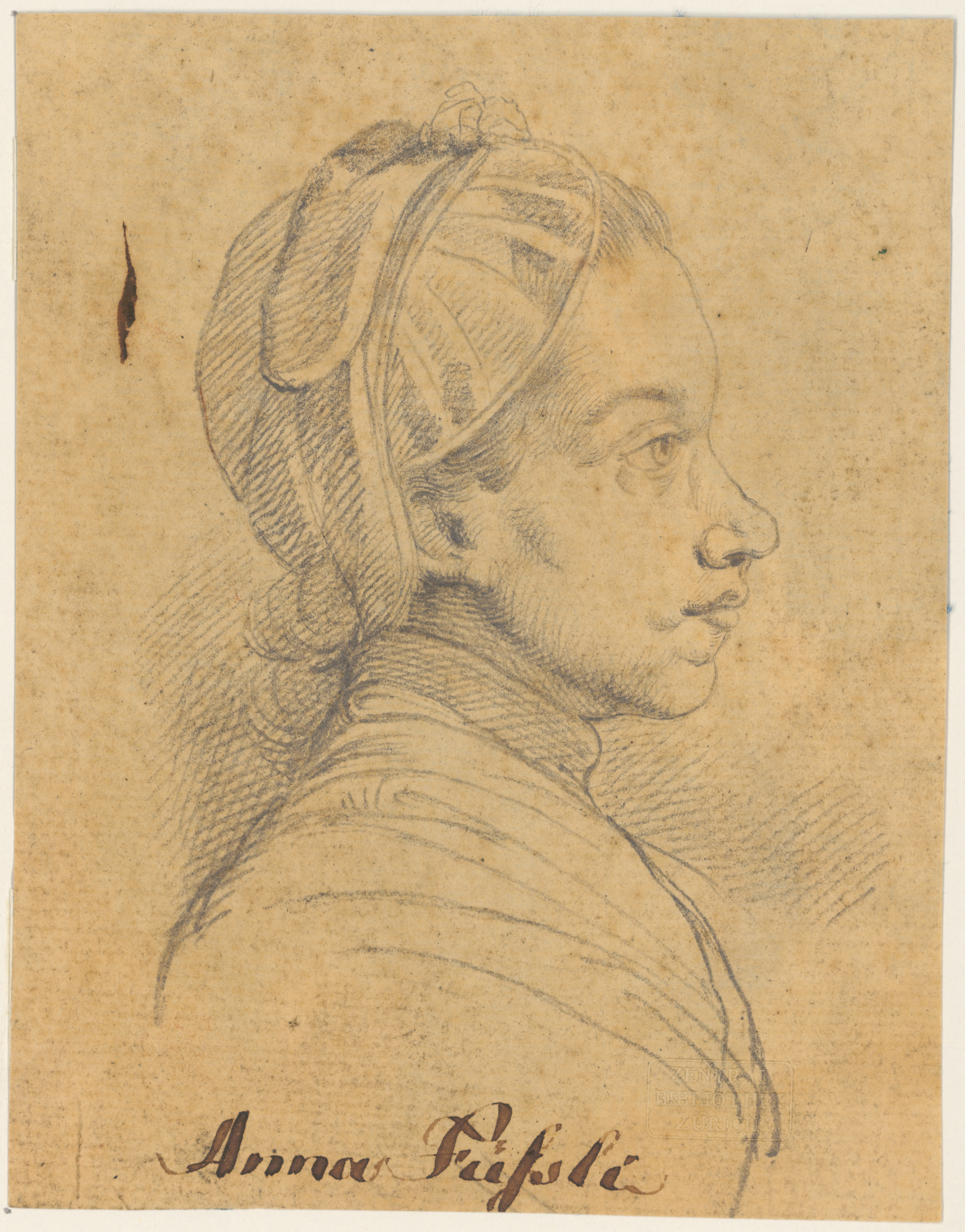
- Anna Füssli, probably drawn by her father, Johann Caspar Füssli
- Born: 16 September 1749; Zürich
- Died: 24 February 1772 (aged 22); Zürich
- Known for: Flower and insect painting

Anna Füssli (16 September 1749 – 24 February 1772), sister of Henry Fuseli, was a Swiss painter of flowers and insects. She died at age 22.

== Life and work ==
Anna Füssli was born in Zürich on 16 September 1749. Her parents were Johann Caspar Füssli and Anna Elisabeth, née Waser. Johann Heinrich, who later became known in England as Henry Fuseli, and Johann Kaspar Füssli were her brothers. Like her elder sister, Elisabeth Füssli (1744–1780), Anna studied with her father and became a painter, specializing in flower and insect paintings. Although her life was short and hardly any of her works are known today, contemporaries described her as an "excellent" artist. She died on 24 February 1772, aged 22.
