= Johann Georg de Hamilton =

- Born: 1672
- Died: 1737 (aged 64–65)
- Father: James de Hamilton
- Relatives: Philipp Ferdinand de Hamilton and Karl Wilhelm de Hamilton (brothers), possibly cousin of Franz de Hamilton

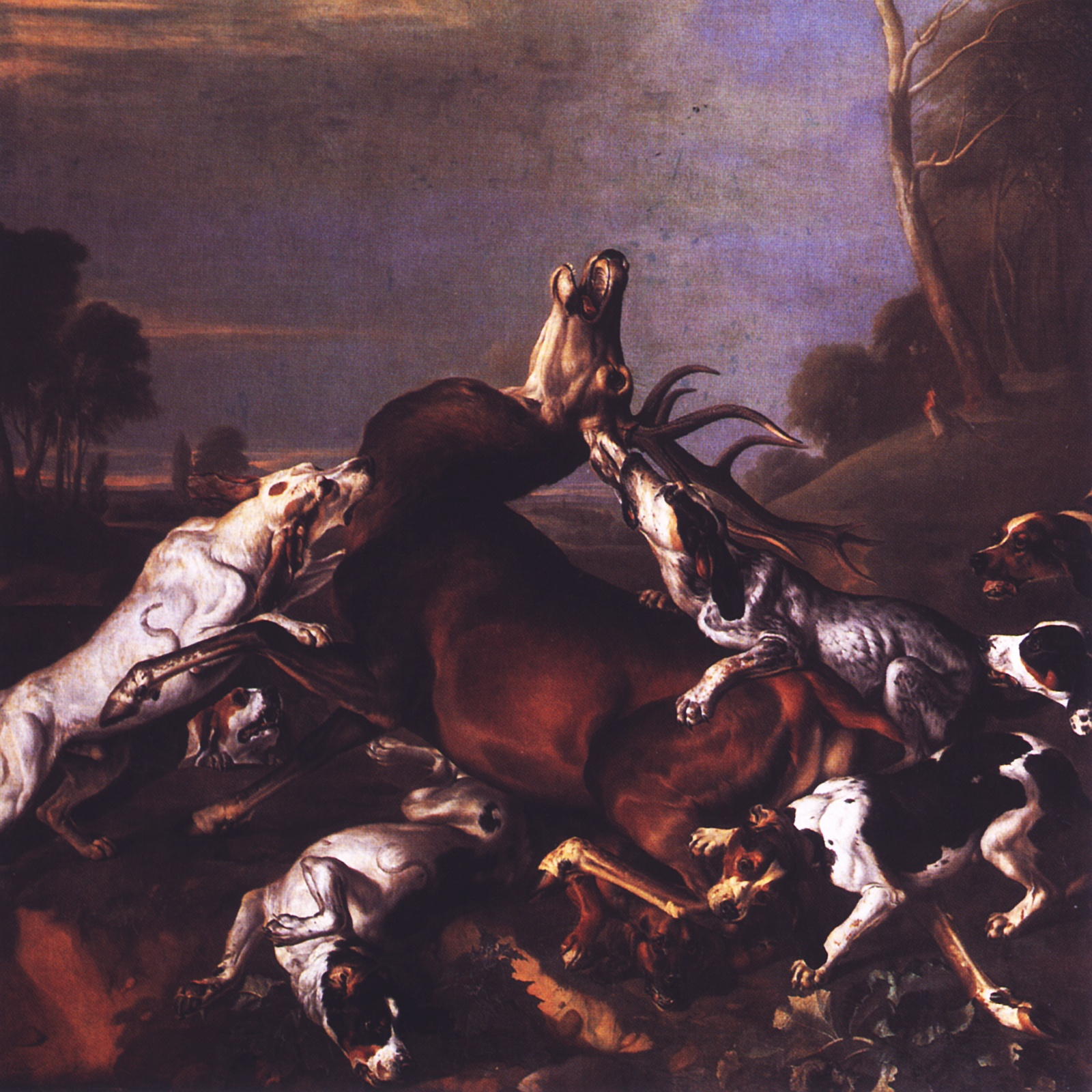
The Stag hunt

Johann Georg de Hamilton (1672 – 1737), was an 18th-century painter from the Southern Netherlands active in Austria.

== Biography ==
He was born in Munich as the son of the Scottish painter James de Hamilton, who taught him to paint. From 1689 he was court painter in Vienna, then after that he moved to Berlin, but after 1718 he was back in Vienna. He is known for hunting scenes like his brother Philipp Ferdinand.
