= James Hamilton (painter) =

Scottish painter

- Occupation: Painter

James Hamilton (fl. 1640–1680), also known as James de Hamilton, was a Scottish painter.

== Biography ==
Hamilton belonged to the family of Hamilton of Murdieston in Fifeshire. A strong royalist, he left Scotland during the Commonwealth for Brussels, where he practised for some years as a painter of animals and still life. He changed his last name to de Hamilton in Brussels. Hamilton had three sons, all born at Brussels, who were highly distinguished in the same line of painting: (1) Ferninand Philip, born 1664, who was appointed painter to the Emperor Charles VI at Vienna, where he resided and died in 1750; (2) John George, born 1666, was also employed by the emperor at Vienna, where he died about 1733; and (3) Charles William, born 1670, was employed by Alexander Sigmund, bishop of Augsburg, where he resided and died in 1754. Pictures by the two elder brothers are in the galleries at Vienna, Munich, Dresden, &c.
