= Philipp Ferdinand de Hamilton =

- Born: c. 1664
- Died: c. 1750
- Father: James de Hamilton
- Relatives: Karl Wilhelm de Hamilton and Johann Georg de Hamilton (brothers), possibly cousin of Franz de Hamilton

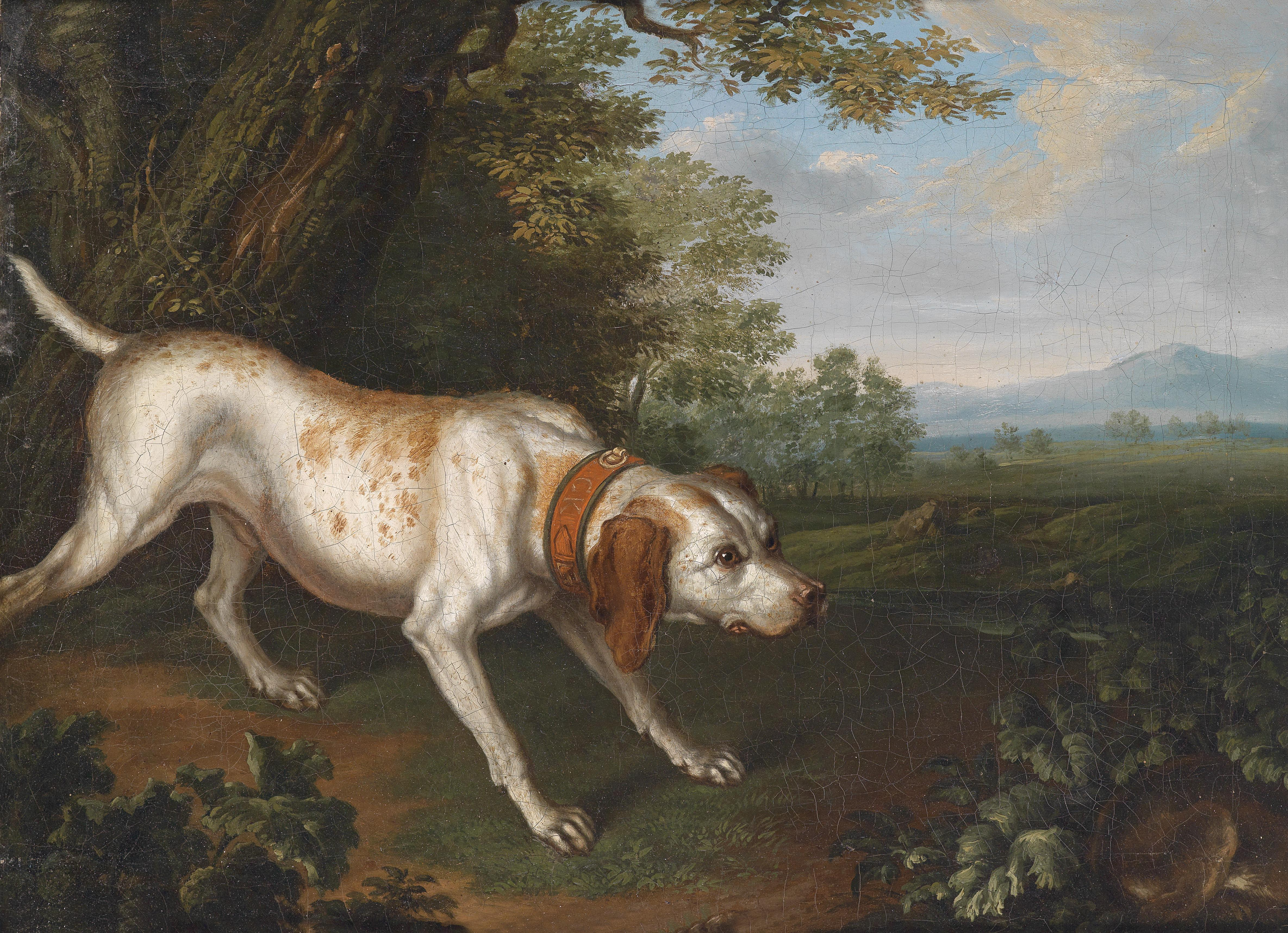
Hunting dog

Philipp Ferdinand de Hamilton (c. 1664 – 1750), was an 18th-century painter from the Southern Netherlands active in Austria.

== Biography ==
He was born in Brussels as the son of the Scottish painter James de Hamilton, who taught him to paint. From 1705 to 1750 he was a court painter in Vienna, and he is known for hunting scenes like his brother Johann Georg. He died in Vienna.
