= Karl Wilhelm de Hamilton =

Painter from Southern Netherlands

- Born: 1668; Brussels
- Died: 23 February 1754 (aged 85–86); Augsburg
- Father: James de Hamilton
- Relatives: Philipp Ferdinand de Hamilton and Johann Georg de Hamilton (brothers), possibly cousin of Franz de Hamilton

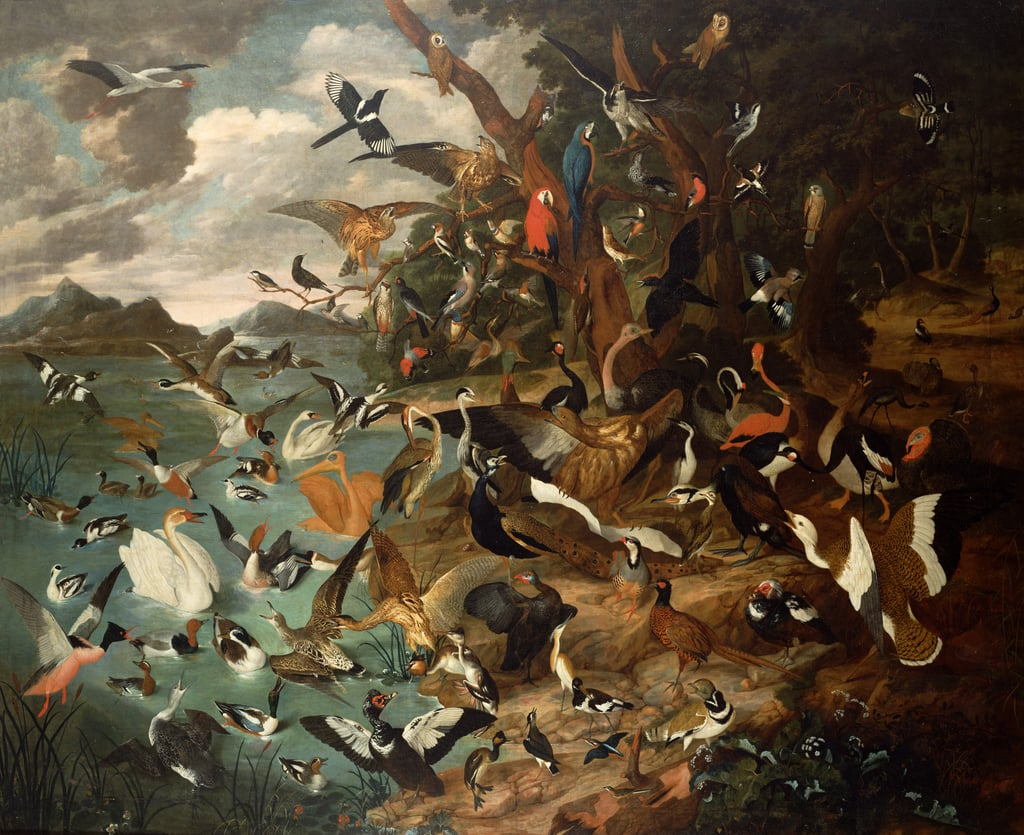
Karl Wilhelm de Hamilton - The Parliament of Birds

Karl Wilhelm de Hamilton, also Carl Wilhelm de Hamilton, Charles William de Hamilton, or Karel-William Von Hamilton (1668 in Brussels – 23 February 1754 in Augsburg) was a painter born at the end of the Dutch Golden Age. He is best known for his ‘forest-floor’ still life landscapes, game piece still life paintings, and bird paintings.

== Biography ==
Karl Wilhelm de Hamilton was one of a large family of artists active in the late 17th and early 18th centuries. He was the son and pupil of Scottish still life painter James de Hamilton (c.1640-1720), who settled and worked in Brussels. His brothers Philipp Ferdinand (c.1664-1750) and Johann Georg (1672-1737) were both active in Vienna, while Karl Wilhelm worked mainly in Germany, first in Baden-Baden and later in Augsburg, where he served as valet and court painter to Bishop Alexander Sigismund von der Pfalz-Neuburg.

He was a teacher of painters Josef Franz Adolph, Johann Elias Ridinger and Johann Jakob Schalch.

== Works ==
Among his most famous works are several variations on a landscape known as The Parliament of Birds, based on a poem by Geoffrey Chaucer written around 1380.

== Collections ==
The following collections contain work(s) by Karl Wilhelm de Hamilton:

- Fitzwilliam Museum (Cambridge, England)
- Wallraf-Richartz Museum (Cologne, Germany)
- Musée des Beaux-Arts (Dijon, France)
- Staatliche Kunsthalle (Karlsruhe, Germany)
- Musée des Beaux-Arts (Lyon, France)
- Staatsgalerie (Stuttgart, Germany)
- Finnish National Gallery (Helsinki, Finland)
