= Schweizerischer Niederlaufhund =

Schweizerischer Niederlaufhund Small Swiss Hound
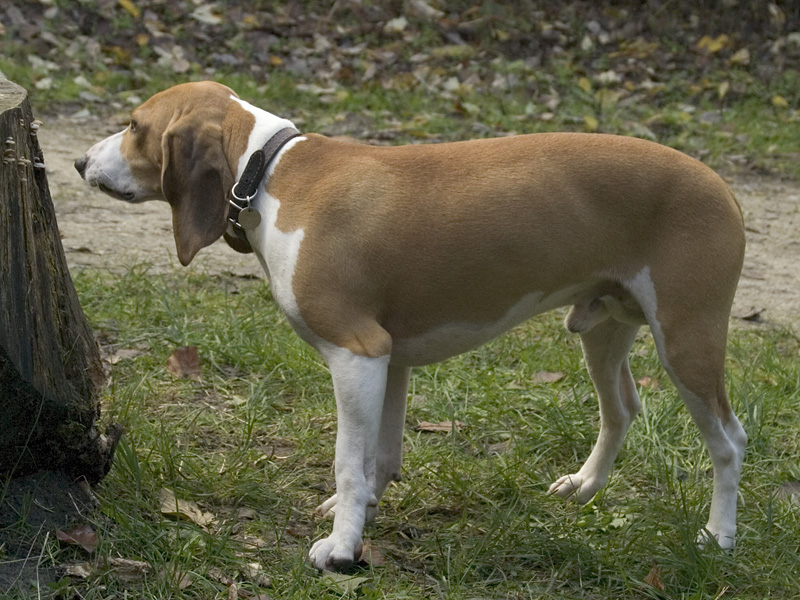
- Small Schwyz Hound, a variety of Schweizerischer Niederlaufhund
- Origin: Switzerland
Kennel club standards
- Fédération Cynologique Internationale: standard
- Notes: Four varieties, one breed

The Schweizerischer Niederlaufhund (Small Swiss Hound), is a breed of dog of the scenthound type from Switzerland. Niederlaufhund means short-legged hound. The breed has a number of different varieties (all of the same breed).

== Description ==
The Swiss Niederlaufhund is an excellent hunting dog used to find and follow a scent even through difficult ground. This dog is also often used to pursue and find wounded animals.

=== Appearance ===
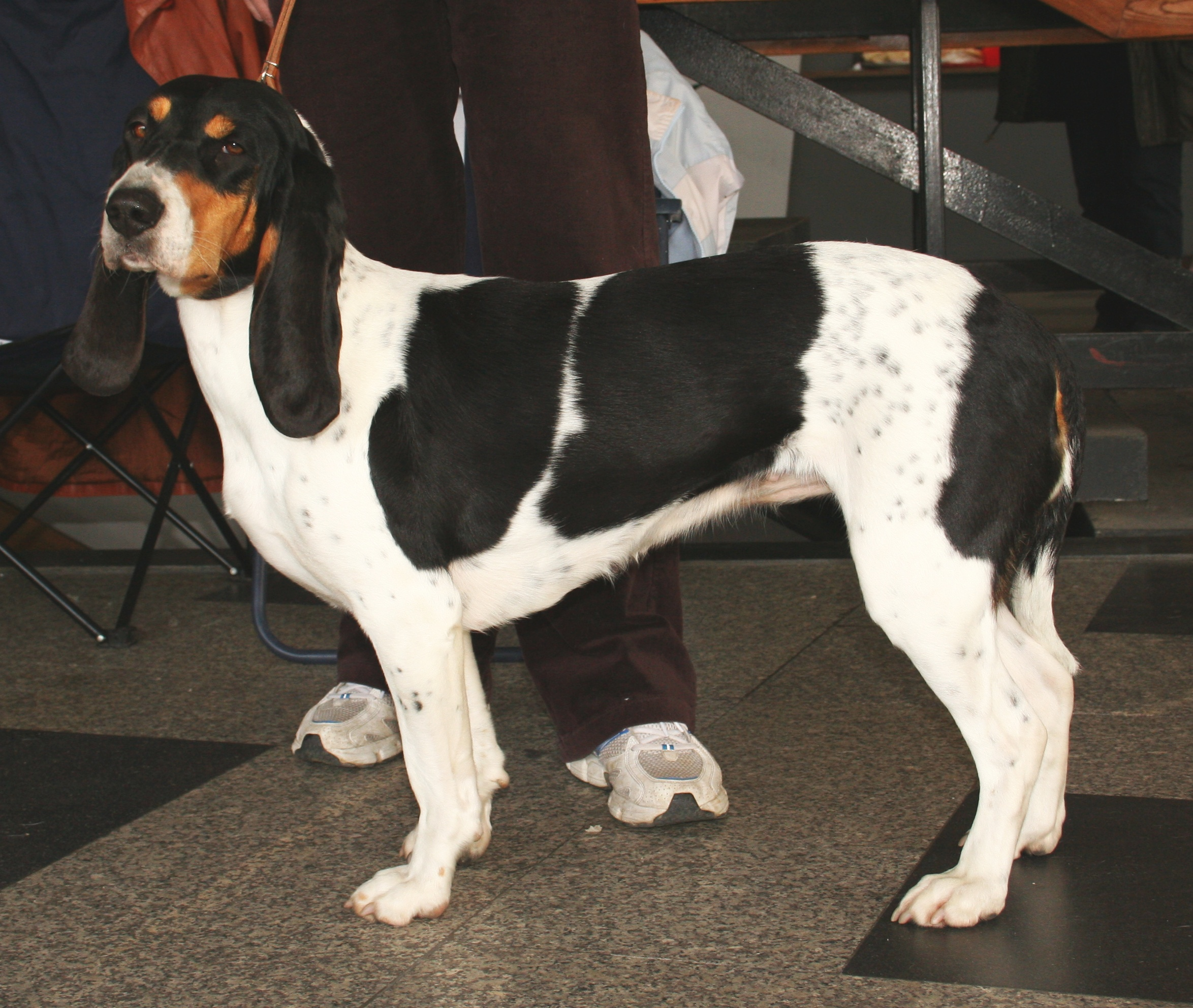
Berner Niederlaufhund

These dogs' height lies between 35 and 43 cm (13.8 -16.9 ins) for the males and 33 and 40 cm (13 and 15.7 ins) for the females. The general appearance is of a hound similar to the Schweizer Laufhund, with a smaller body and shorter legs. They appear to be square but are a little longer than they are tall and well-structured. The head is well clearly shaped and noble with a friendly and alert expression. The chest. The legs are strong with a robust structure. At a calm pace they carry the tail low; when they run ,it is a bit lifted. The breed has long, drop ears and a long tail.

The coat can be short and smooth or a bit longer and stiff depending on the type.

The varieties of the Schweizerischer Niederlaufhund are arranged by coat colour and texture:

- Small Bernese Hound (Berner Niederlaufhund) - tricolour: white, black and tan, tan marks over the eyes.
  - short-haired Small Bernese Hound - short and smooth coat
  - wire-haired Small Bernese Hound - harsh single coat, small beard on the face
- Small Jura Hound (Jura Niederlaufhund) -smooth single coat, black with tan markings above the eyes, some white.
- Small Lucerne Hound (Luzerner Niederlaufhund) - smooth white coat speckled with grey or black to give a blue appearance, with black patches and tan marks over the eyes.
- Small Schwyz Hound (Schwyzer Niederlaufhund )- smooth white coat with yellow-red to orange-red patches. There was once a wire-haired variety of the Small Schwyz Hound, but it is now extinct.

==== Berner Niederlaufhund ====
This type is bred in both short-haired and wire-haired varieties and both are always tri-colored: white, black and tan. The base color is white with big black spots. Some little spots are allowed. Over the eyes and on the cheeks, these dogs have maroon-colored spots. A black mantle is allowed. The skin is black pigmented under the dark coat and marbled under the white coat.

==== Jura Niederlaufhund ====
This type usually has a smooth coat. A deep black color with some maroon-colored spots over the eyes, on the cheeks, chest and legs is preferred. A maroon base color with a black mantle is also allowed. White spots are tolerated only on the chest if they are not too big. The skin is dark pigmented under the black coat and paler under the spots.

==== Luzerner Niederlaufhund ====
This type has a smooth, short coat. The base color is white, white and gray mottled or white and black mottled. Some bigger black spots or a black mantle are allowed. Maroon-colored spots over the eyes and on the cheeks can appear. The skin is dark pigmented under the black coat and paler under the mottled coat.

==== Schwyzer Niederlaufhund ====
This type has a smooth coat. The base color is white with reddish-colored spots. Some smaller spots and a mantle are allowed. The skin is dark grey-colored under the reddish coat and marbled under the white coat.

=== Temperament ===
The Niederlaufhunde have a great sense of smell; they are fast, agile and passionate hunters which keep good track of the scent they are supposed to follow. Their voice is pleasant. These dogs are friendly, courageous and never aggressive. Some specimens are calmer than others.

== History ==
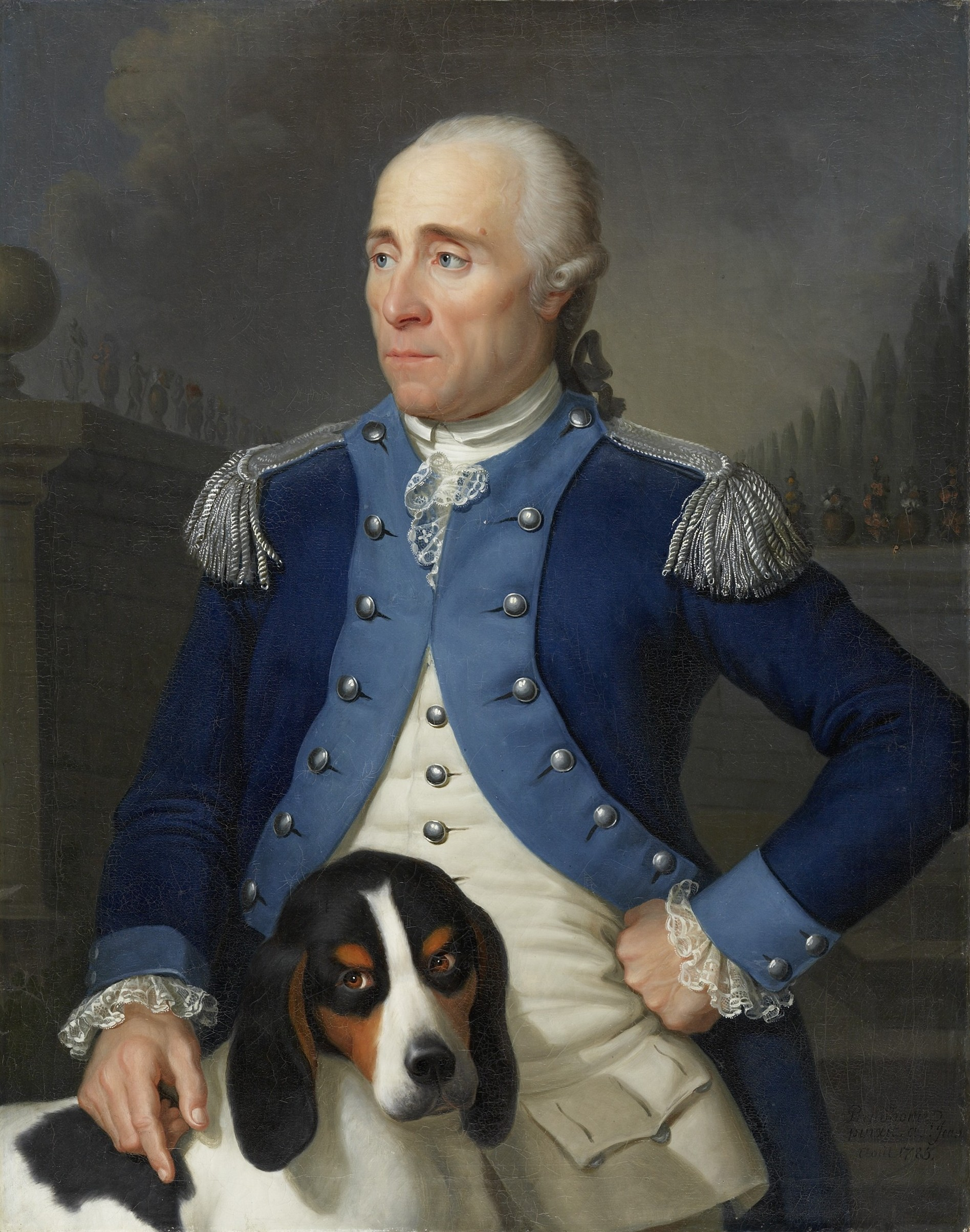
Franz Rudolf Frisching in the uniform of an officer of the Bernese Huntsmen Corps with his Berner Laufhund, painted by Jean Preudhomme in 1785

Around 1900 the hunting activities were restricted to districts, and since the hounds used until then were too fast for these limited areas, it was decided to establish a new type of hound. Using selected specimens of the medium-sized Schweizer Laufhund, smaller, shorter-legged hunting dogs were created. The Schweizer Niederlaufhund Club was formed on July 1, 1905.

== See also ==
- List of dog breeds
- Schweizer Laufhund
