= Johann Kaspar Füssli =

Swiss entomologist (1743–1786)

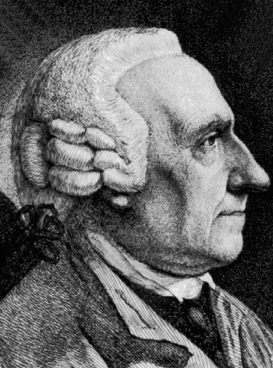
Johann Kaspar Füssli

Johann Kaspar Füssli, also written Johann Caspar Fuesslin, or Fuessly (9 March 1743 – 4 May 1786), was a Swiss painter, entomologist and publisher.

He was born in Zurich, the son of Johann Caspar Füssli (1706–1782) and Anna Elisabeth Waser. He was thus the brother of Henry Fuseli (Johann Heinrich Füssli, 1745–1825). He married twice: to Verena Störi in 1770, and Anna Elisabeth Kilchsperger in 1774.

The only spider species he described (as Fuesslin, 1775) that is accepted as of February 2025 is the "daddy long-legs spider", Pholcus phalangioides, also known as the "cellar spider", which he called Aranea phalangoides. Aranea longipes, which he described in the same work, is now considered to be synonym of Tegenaria domestica, first described by C. Clerck in 1757.

He died, aged 43, in Winterthur.

== Publications ==
- Verzeichnis der ihm bekannten Schweitzerischen Inseckten (1775), doi:10.5962/bhl.title.65772
- Fuessly, Johann Caspar (1778). Magazin für die Liebhaber der Entomologie Vol. 1. Bey dem Herausgeber und bey Heinrich Steiner.
- Fuessly, Johann Caspar (1779). Magazin für die Liebhaber der Entomologie Vol. 2. Bey dem Herausgeber und bey Heinrich Steiner.
- Neue Magazin für Liebhaber der Entomologie (1781–86).
