= Jean Preudhomme =

Swiss painter

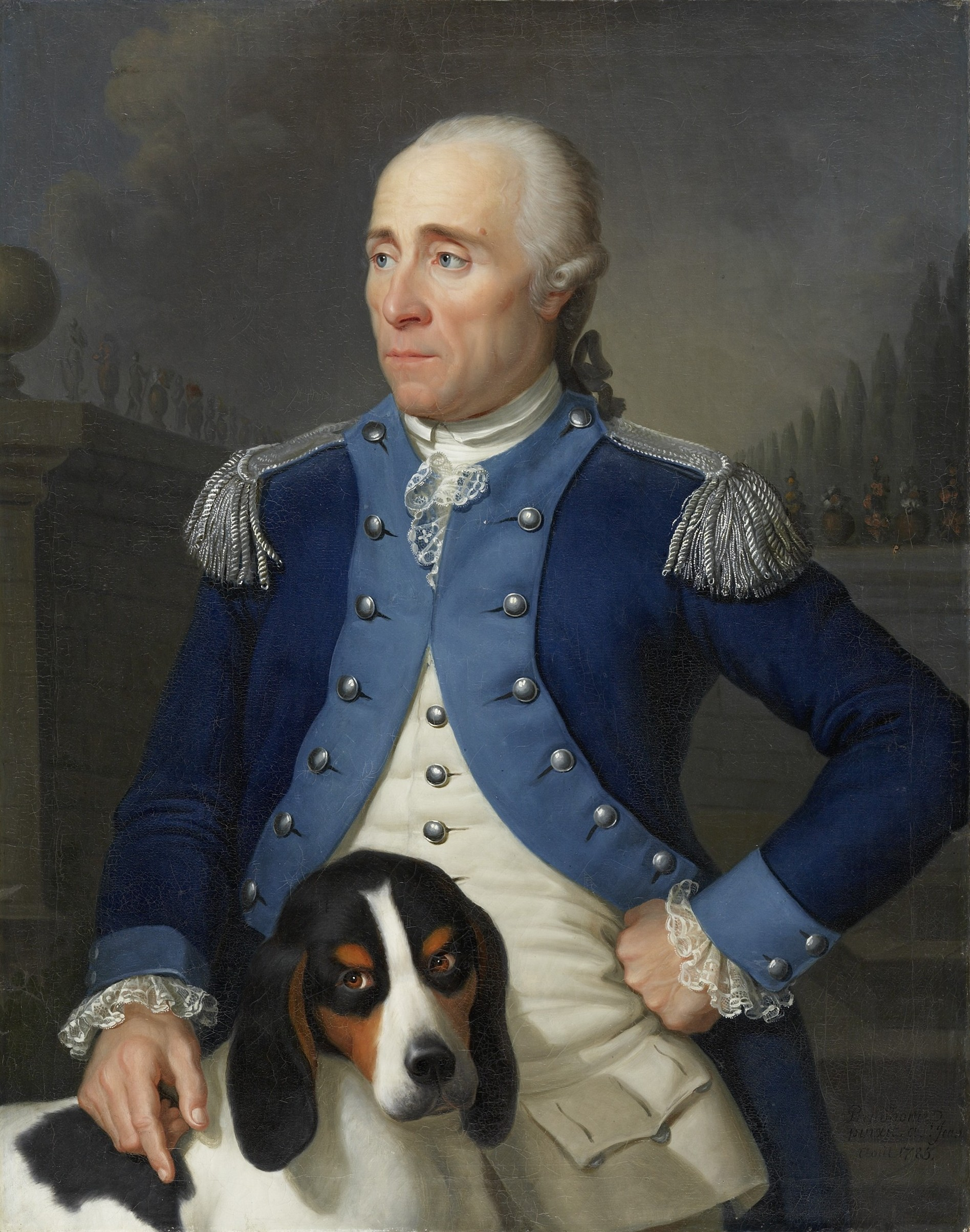
- Franz Rudolf Frisching in the uniform of an officer of the Bernese Huntsmen Corps with his Berner Laufhund, painted by Jean Preudhomme in 1785
- Born: c. 23 November 1732; Rolle, Switzerland
- Died: c. 20 July 1795 (aged 62)
- Burial place: La Neuveville, Switzerland
- Other names: Jean Preud'ho(m)me, Jean Prudhomme
- Occupation: painter
- Known for: portrait painting
- Notable work: portrait of Douglas, 8th Duke of Hamilton

Jean Preudhomme or Preud'ho(m)me or Prudhomme (c. 23 November 1732 – c. 20 July 1795) was a Swiss painter. He was a contemporary of the Swiss painters Anton Graff, Johann Jakob Schalch, Angelica Kauffman, Jakob Emanuel Handmann, Johann Caspar Füssli and his son Johann Heinrich Füssli.

== Life and work ==
Jean Preudhomme was baptised on 23 November 1732 in Rolle. He was a pupil of the well known painters Jean Baptiste Le Prince and Jean-Baptiste Greuze in Paris. He was a landscapist and an animal painter. However, his speciality was portrait painting. In Switzerland he was very popular with the landed gentry and the patricians in Geneva, Lausanne, Neuchâtel and Bern. In a Swiss publication, published between 1782 and 1786, he was described as a “portraitist à la mode”. Preudhomme's paintings, especially the portraits, are rare on the art market. His portrait of Franz Rudolf Frisching is one of his best known paintings.

== Paintings in public collections ==
Preudhomme's portrait of Douglas, 8th Duke of Hamilton, on his Grand Tour with his physician Dr John Moore and the latter's son John, with a view of Geneva in the distance, is in the collection of the National Museums of Scotland. On his Grand Tour the Duke and his companions stayed for two years in Geneva.

A portrait of a Lady is in the collection of the Musée Rath.

== Literature ==
- Brun, Schweizerisches Künstlerlexikon
