= Johann Caspar Füssli =

Swiss artist (1706–1782)

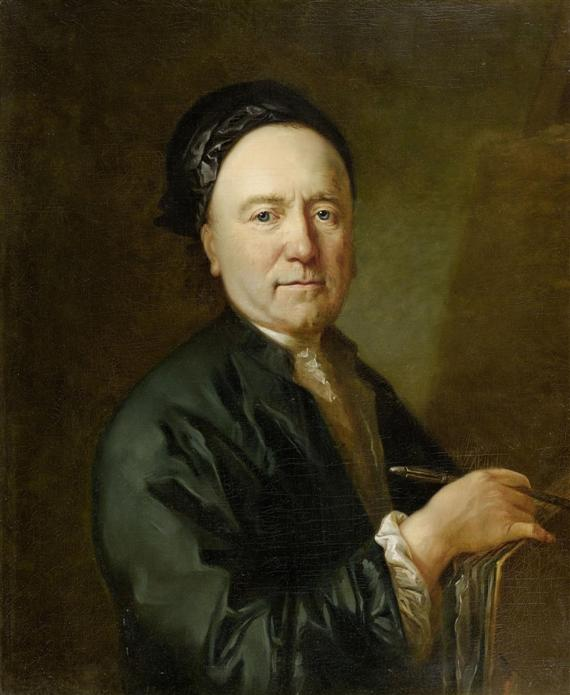
- Füssli by Anton Graff, 1765
- Born: 3 January 1706; Zurich
- Died: 6 May 1782 (aged 76); Zurich
- Children: Johann Heinrich, Johann Kaspar, Anna, 1 other daughter and 14 others

Johann Caspar Füssli (3 January 1706 – 6 May 1782) was a Swiss portrait painter and art historian.

== Biography ==
Füssli was born in Zürich to Hans Rudolf Füssli, who was also a painter, and Elisabeth Schärer. He studied painting in Vienna between 1724 and 1731, and then became a portraitist in the courts of southern Germany. In 1736, he returned to Zürich, where he painted members of the government and figures of the Enlightenment era such as Johann Jakob Bodmer and Friedrich Gottlieb Klopstock. He also wrote and illustrated two dictionaries of Swiss painters and became well known as an art historian.

He married Elisabeth Waser, and they had 18 children. Four of them later became known as painters: Johann Heinrich ("Henry Fuseli", 1741–1825), Johann Kaspar (1743–1786), Elisabeth (1744–1780), and Anna (1749–1772). Johann Caspar Füssli died in Zürich in 1782.

== Publications ==
- Geschichte und Abbildung der besten Mahler in der Schweitz ("History and Illustration of the Best Painters in Switzerland"), 1754–1757.
- Geschichte der besten Künstler in der Schweitz ("History of the Best Artists in Switzerland"), 1769–1779.

== Gallery ==
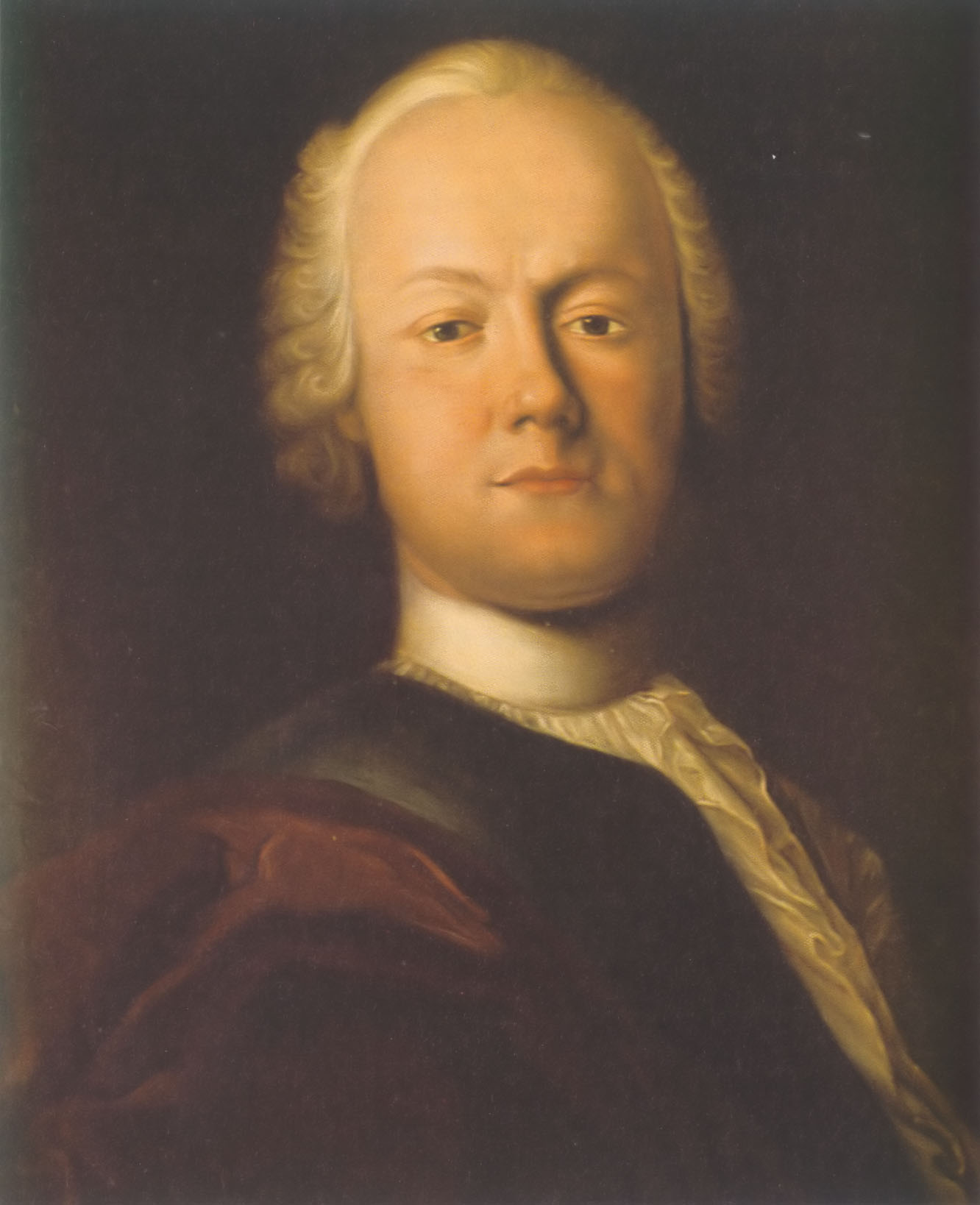
Portrait of Friedrich Gottlieb Klopstock (1750)

Portrait of Ewald Christian von Kleist (1753)

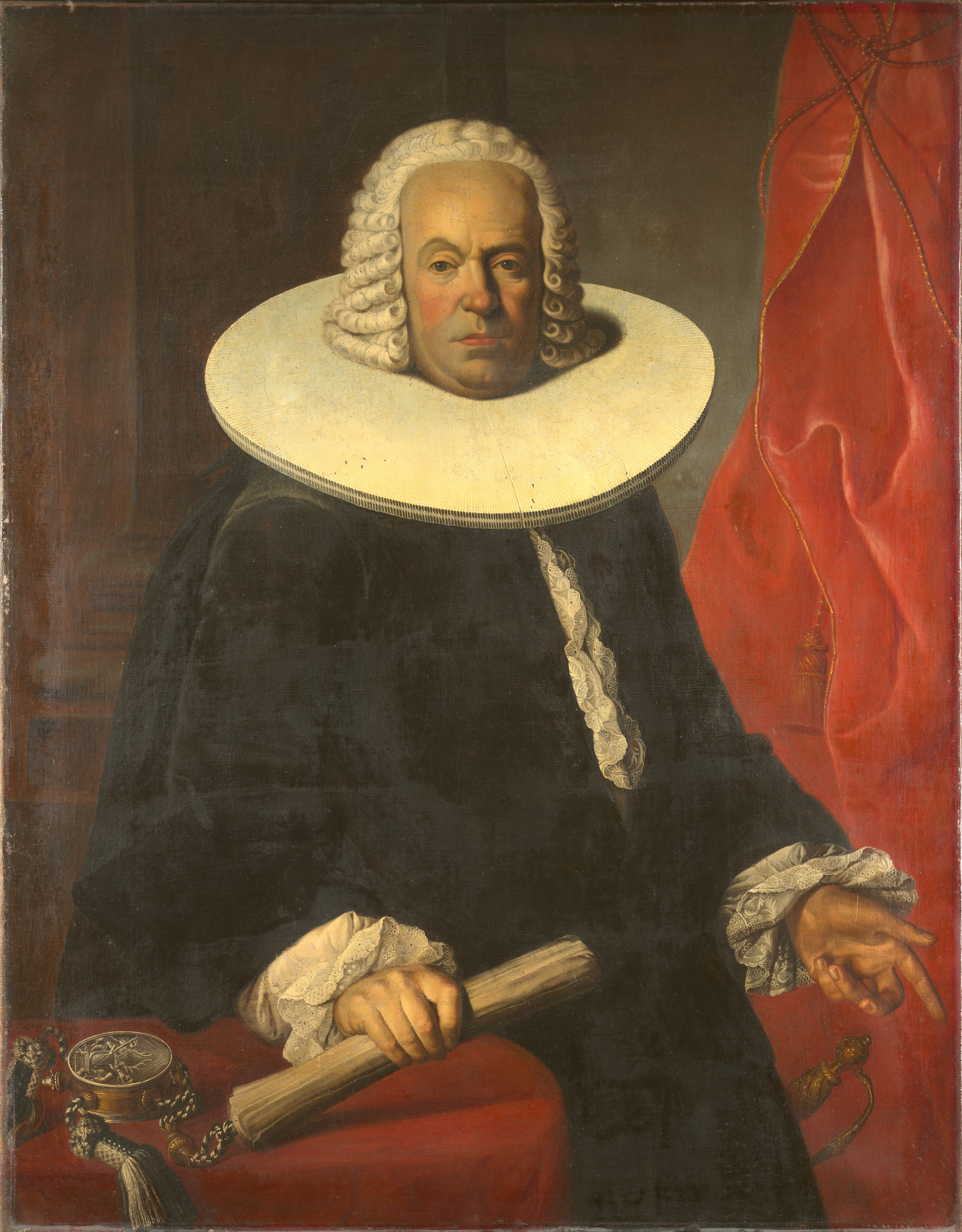
Portrait of Hans Jakob Leu (c. 1759)
