= Franz Rudolf Frisching =

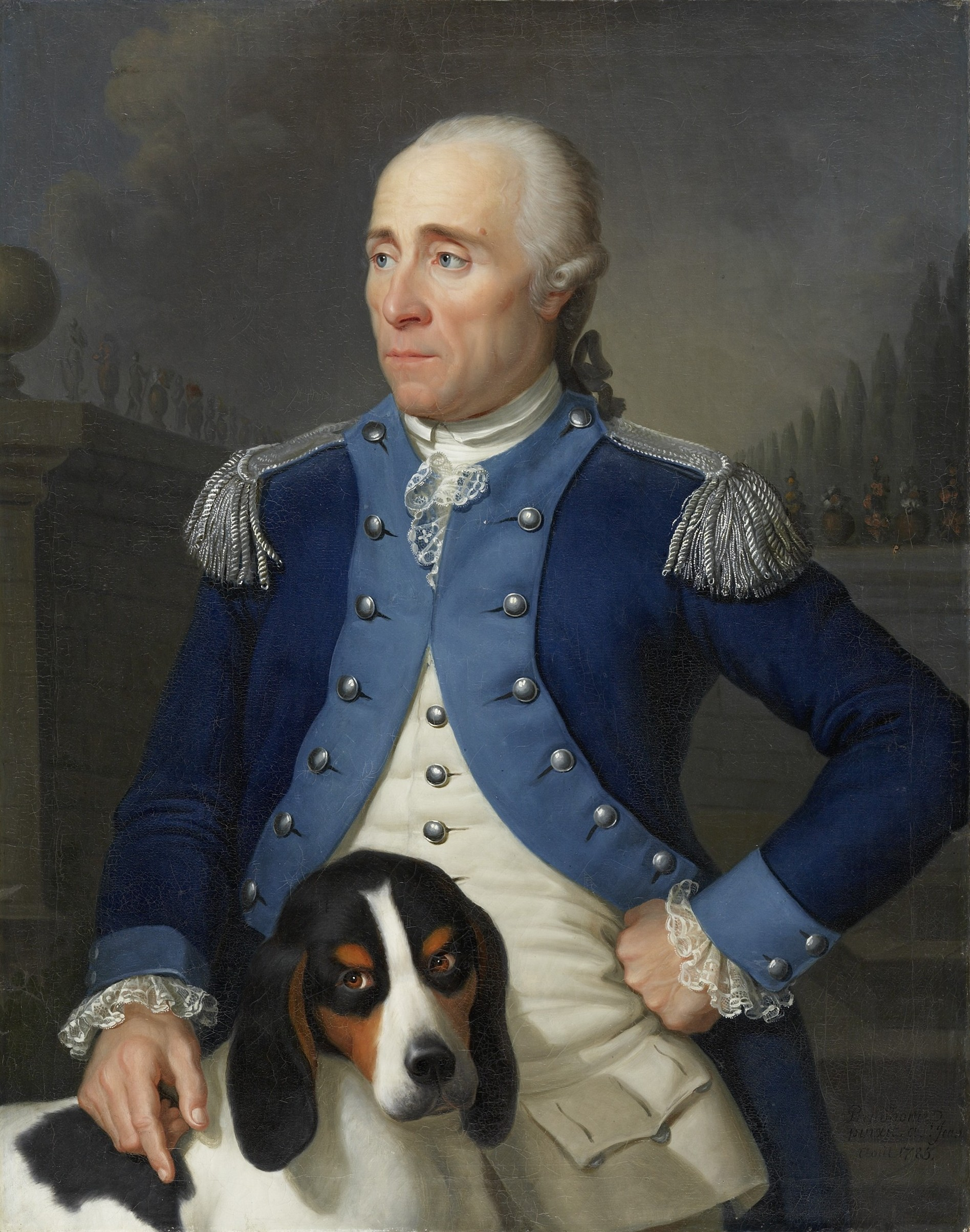
- Franz Rudolf Frisching in the uniform of an officer of the Bernese Jäger Corps with his Berner Laufhund, painted by Jean Preudhomme in 1785.
- Born: Franz Rudolf Frisching; 1733; Bern, Switzerland
- Died: 1807 (aged 73–74); Hofstetten
- Spouse(s): Anne Madeleine van Back (1738–1763); Secondly Frisching married Armanda Gross (1743–1829) in 1764 (the marriage was divorced later)
- Children: First marriage: Johann Rudolf (1761–1838); Anna Adrienne Margarethe (1755–1800); Second marriage: Julia Armanda (1768–1807)
- Parent(s): Vinzenz Frisching (1689–1764), Master of Schlosswil

Franz Rudolf Frisching (c. 1733 – c. 1807) was a Swiss nobleman, military officer, politician and industrialist.

== Life and career ==
Frisching was the son of Vinzenz Frisching (1689–1764) who was Master of Schlosswil. In 1748, Franz Rudolf Frisching became a member of the Swiss Guards of the Netherlands where he achieved the rank of a colonel.

In 1764, Frisching became a member of the Grand Council of Bern. In 1770 he became bailiff in the Vallemaggia, in 1780 bailiff in St. Johannsen and in 1793 office holder in Wimmis. He was lieutenant colonel of the Bernese Jäger Corps.

Frisching was the founder of the Frisching Faience Manufactory in Bern. Between 1750 and 1777 the Frisching family was in the possession of the large Lorraine Gut, a former country estate which is now part of the city of Bern. His ancestor, Samuel Frisching (II), built the Frisching-Haus, now known as the Béatrice-von-Wattenwyl-Haus on the Junkerngasse in Bern.
