= Morlot =

Morlot is a surname. Notable people with the surname include:

- Antoine Morlot (1766–1809), French military leader
- Daniel Morlot (1596–1670), Swiss politician
- François-Nicholas-Madeleine Morlot (1795–1862), French prelate of the Roman Catholic Church
- Franz Ludwig Morlot (1667–1725), Swiss officer and politician
- José Lacret Morlot (1850–1904), Cuban general and politician
- Ludovic Morlot (born 1973), French conductor of classical music
- Samuel Morlot (1670–1763), Swiss officer and politician

== See also ==
- Adolph von Morlot
- Albert von Morlot
- Gottlieb Emanuel von Morlot
- Morlot family
