= Gmelin =

Gmelin may refer to:

- Carl Christian Gmelin (1762–1837), German botanist, author of Flora Badensis, Alsatica et confinium regionum cis- et transrhenania (1806)
- Charles Gmelin (1872–1950), British Olympic athlete
- Christian Gottlob Gmelin (1792–1860), a German chemist and mineralogist
- Herta Däubler-Gmelin (born 1943), German politician (SPD), former German Minister of Justice
- Jeannine Gmelin (born 1990), Swiss Olympic rower
- Johann Friedrich Gmelin (1748–1804), German naturalist; publisher of the Systema Naturae of Carolus Linnaeus; son of Philip Friedrich
- Johann Georg Gmelin (1709–1755), German naturalist; explorer of Siberia, author of Flora Sibirica
- Leopold Gmelin (1788–1853), German chemist, son of Johann Friedrich
  - Gmelin's test, a chemical test introduced by Gmelin
  - Gmelin database, a German handbook/encyclopedia of inorganic compounds initiated by Gmelin
- Philipp Friedrich Gmelin (1721–1768), German botanist and chemist; brother of Johann Georg
- Samuel Gottlieb Gmelin (1744–1774), German naturalist; author of Historia Fucorum, the first work on marine biology; nephew of Johann Georg
- Wilhelm Gmelin (1891–1978), German footballer
