= Wilhelm Karl Ritter von Haidinger =

Austrian mineralogist (1795–1871)

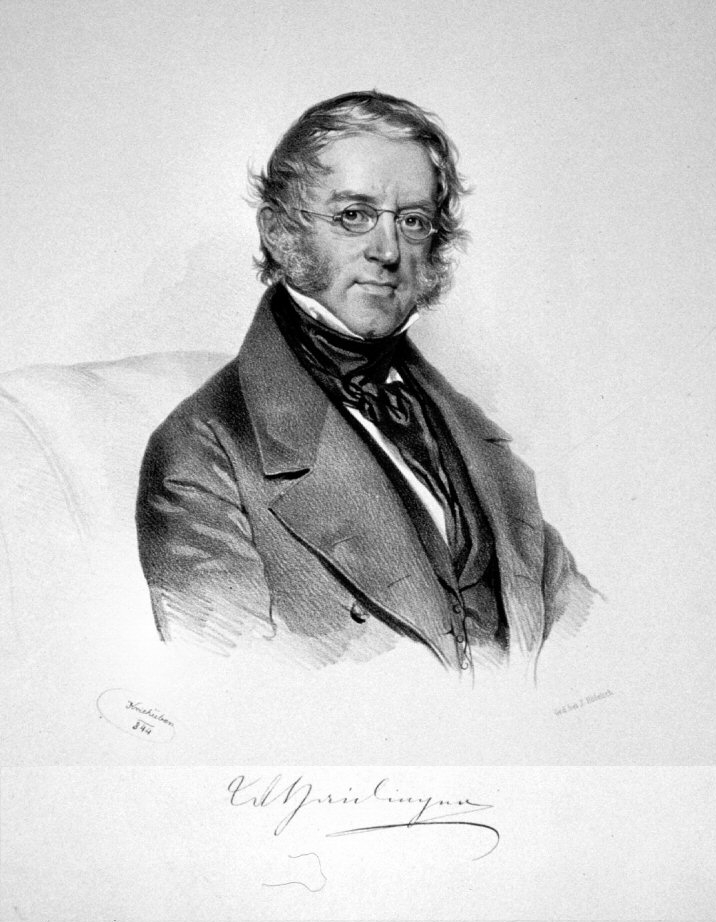
- Born: 5 February 1795; Vienna, Habsburg Austria
- Died: 19 March 1871 (aged 76); Dornbach, Vienna, Austrian Empire

Wilhelm Karl Haidinger (5 February 1795 – 19 March 1871), ennobled as Wilhelm Ritter von Haidinger in 1864, was an Austrian mineralogist.

== Early life ==
Haidinger's father was the mineralogist Karl Haidinger (1756–1797), who died when Wilhelm was only two years old. The books on mineralogy and the collection of rocks and minerals of his father almost certainly had raised the interest of young Wilhelm. The collection of his uncle, banker Jakob Friedrich van der Nüll, was by far larger and much more precious, even to such a degree that famous professor Friedrich Mohs of Freiberg (Germany) had been asked to describe it in detail. Young Wilhelm Haidinger and the professor often met in the house of Wilhelm's uncle. After completing the Normalschule and the Grammatikalschule, Wilhelm started out his preacademical training at the local Gymnasium. However, after completing only his first year, the Humanitätsclasse, Wilhelm (now 17 years old) was asked by professor Friedrich Mohs to join him as his assistant at the newly founded Universalmuseum Joanneum in Graz.

== Scientific career ==
During the next five years in Graz and the following six years in Freiberg, Wilhelm Haidinger remained a devoted assistant and admirer of professor Friedrich Mohs. During these years Haidinger became more and more involved in scientific work. In 1821 Wilhelm Haidinger published his first scientific paper: "On the crystallisation of copper-pyrites" in the Memoirs of the Wernerian Natural History Society (Edinburgh), volume 4, pp. 1–18. This paper formed the start of a grand total of some 350 scientific publications, all of which are listed in volume 3 of the Catalogue of Scientific Papers (1800–1863) and volume 10 of the same catalogue for the years 1864–1883. Apart from all these papers, Wilhelm Haidinger published several books: Anfangsgründe der Mineralogie, an account on the collection of the "k. k. Hofkammer im Münz- und Bergwesen"; a review of mineralogical research (which grew into a well-known series edited by Gustav Adolph Kenngott); his Handbuch der bestimmenden Mineralogie; an atlas to this textbook on mineralogy and the first complete geological map of Austria-Hungary.

In 1822, Wilhelm Haidinger accompanied August Graf von Breunner-Enckevoirt (1796–1877) on a six-month trip; they traveled from Linz to Munich, Basel, Paris, London, and Edinburgh. In Edinburgh, banker Thomas Allan provided Haidinger with the means to translate Mohs' Grundriss der Mineralogie into English. (The translation appeared in 1823 in three volumes: Treatise on Mineralogy.)

In 1823, Haidinger left Freiberg to resettle in Edinburgh, where he stayed until the summer of 1825. In Edinburgh, Haidinger met mineralogists Robert Jameson and Robert Ferguson of Raith, geologist James Hall, chemists Thomas Thomson and Edward Turner, and physicist David Brewster. The years in Edinburgh are among Haidinger's most productive: The translation of the comprehensive textbook by Mohs appeared in print and 33 scientific papers were written and published (in, for example, The Edinburgh Journal of Science of David Brewster and in the Philosophical Journal of Robert Jameson). While in Edinburgh Haidinger's friend Pierre Berthier named a new mineral (an iron antimony sulfide) "Haidingérite".

== Return to Austria ==
A long journey with Robert Allan (the son of Thomas Allan) in 1825 and 1826 brought Wilhelm Haidinger to Norway, Sweden, Denmark, Germany, Austria, and northern Italy. He spent the winter months of 1825 and 1826 in the highest scientific circles of Berlin, where he met, for example, Gustav Rose and Heinrich Rose, Friedrich Wöhler, Eilhard Mitscherlich, Heinrich Gustav Magnus, and Johann Christian Poggendorff. In the spring of 1826, the journey was continued and visits to Friedrich Mohs in Freiberg, to Johann Friedrich Ludwig Hausmann and Friedrich Stromeyer in Göttingen, Hermann von Meyer in Frankfurt, Carl Cäsar Ritter von Leonhard and Leopold Gmelin in Heidelberg, Christian Gmelin and Franz von Kobell in Munich, and Franz Xaver Riepl in Vienna completed their trip.

In 1827, Wilhelm Haidinger returned to Austria and became one of the directors of the Erste (böhmische) Porzellan-Industrie Aktien Gesellschaft (Epiag) in Elbogen (now Loket, Czech Republic). Working in the ceramics factory owned by his brothers Eugen and Rudolf did not prevent Wilhelm from continuing his mineralogical research and writing scientific papers.From 1827 to 1840, Haidinger published some 24 papers (according to the Catalogue of Scientific Papers), which appeared in such well-known journals as Poggendorff's Annalen and the Zeitschrift für Physik. One of the papers described the occurrence of fossil plants in the brown coal and sandstones of the surroundings of Elbogen (Loket).

In 1840, Haidinger moved to Vienna to succeed his tutor Friedrich Mohs as director of the mineralogical collection of the Kaiserlich-Königlichen Hofkammer im Münz- und Bergwesen. How much Haidinger devoted himself to science in general is evident from the fact that he founded a nongovernmental scientific society: the Freunde der Naturwissenschaften in Wien. Becker, in 1871, recalled how Haidinger had been able to organize his scientific society in spite of serious opposition from the Austrian police. Haidinger, founder and president of the Freunde der Naturwissenschaften in Wien undertook to publish its proceedings from 1840 to 1850. The last meeting of the Freunde der Naturwissenschaften in Wien took place on 29 November 1850. After that, the learned society ceased to exist. In addition to his work on the collections of the mineralogical museum and his lectures on mineralogy and geology to young mining engineers, Haidinger found the time to continue his own research and published some 105 papers from 1849 to 1860.

== Dolomitization ==
Haidinger's scientific work became increasingly concentrated on the phenomenon of "pseudomorphosis", that is, minerals that have taken up the outer aspect of another mineral. For example, anhydrite would have changed into gypsum, but the original cleavage planes and crystal habitus would give the impression of anhydrite. Another example given by Haidinger was that of calcium carbonate, which would readily change into calcium magnesium carbonate (dolomite). In his own words:

... part of the carbonate of lime is replaced by carbonate of magnesia, so as to form in the new species a compound of one atom each. How this change was brought about, is a difficult question to resolve, though the fact cannot be doubted, as we have in the specimen described a demonstration of it, approaching in certainty almost to ocular evidence.

To geologists, Haidinger is known especially for his postulate of the "dolomitization" reaction that would change calcium carbonate into dolomite at low temperatures (below 100 °C). A solution of magnesium sulfate would convert calcium carbonate into dolomite plus calcium sulfate in solution. Nonetheless in 1844, Haidinger related how his friends, well-known chemists Friedrich Wöhler, Eilhard Mitscherlich, and Leopold Gmelin, had explained to him that powdered dolomite will react, even at room temperature, with a solution of calcium sulfate to give calcium carbonate plus a solution of magnesium sulfate. (Durch meinem verehrten Freund Wöhler wurde ich auf die Beobachtung, die auch Mitscherlich und L. Gmelin anführen, aufmerksam gemacht, daß man Dolomit in Pulverform künstlich zerlegen kann, wenn man eine Auflösung von Gyps durch denselben dringen läßt. Bittersalz wird gebildet und kohlensaurer Kalk bleibt zurück. Dieser Versuch erläutert wohle mit hinreichender Evidenz die Bildung des Kalkspathes aus Dolomit bei unserer gewöhnlichen Temperatur und atmosphärischer Pressung: Haidinger, 1844, p. 250.) Haidinger's employee at the Kaiserlich-Königlichen Hofkammer im Münz- und Bergwesen, Adolph von Morlot, undertook to investigate the formation of dolomite in the laboratory (no doubt at the request of Haidinger). The outcome of the experiments confirmed what Friedrich Wöhler had predicted in 1843; dolomite does not form from calcium carbonate plus a solution of magnesium sulfate unless high temperatures (more than 200° Reamur = 250 °C) and high pressures were applied. Von Morlot used calcite powder soaked in a concentrated solution of magnesium sulfate sealed in a glass tube. Heating the glass tube in an oil bath increased the pressure inside it to at least 15 bar. The glass tube was able to withstand this high pressure only because it had been placed inside a gun barrel filled with sand. In this way, Von Morlot in 1847 had clearly demonstrated the existence of a minimum temperature for the synthesis of the mineral dolomite. When Von Morlot (1847 A) reacted dolomite powder with a concentrated solution of calcium sulfate at room temperature, the result was (solid) calcium carbonate plus a solution of magnesium sulfate. (Wenn man nämlich durch gepulverten Dolomit eine Auflösung von Gyps filtriert, so entsteht die umgekehrte doppelte Zersetzung in der Art, daß Bittersalz aufgelöst durch's Filtrum geht, während kohlensaurer Kalk zurück bleibt: Von Morlot, 1847 A, p. 309.)

== Moral standards ==
Ritter von Hauer (1871), in his necrology of Wilhelm Haidinger, recalled with great pride how open-minded Haidinger had been. The very thought of censoring any scientific publication would have been alien to him. In this regard, it must be remembered how Wilhelm Haidinger had allowed Adolph von Morlot to publish his accounts on the laboratory syntheses of dolomite first and foremost in Haidinger's own Berichte über die Mittheilungen von Freunden der Naturwissenschaften in Wien (at the same time Morlot's paper on the synthesis of dolomite appeared in four other well-known journals.)

As part of his mineralogical research, Haidinger studied the optical behaviour of minerals, which led to his discovery of the phenomenon of pleochroïsm.

A major step in Haidinger's career took place in 1849 - the founding of the Kaiserlich-Königliche geologische Reichs-Anstalt on 15 November 1849 in Vienna. Haidinger became its first director. The k. k. Hofkammer im Münz- und Bergwesen now became part of this newly founded geological office of Imperial Austria-Hungary. A detailed account of all events in relation with this major reorganization was published by Haidinger in 1864. Details of Haidinger's years as director of the Austrian geological survey were published by Haidinger's successor Franz Ritter von Hauer.

Little or no doubt can remain as to the scientific status that Wilhelm Haidinger achieved from 1850 to 1866: the Kaiserlich-Königliche Geologische Reichsanstalt became the epicentre of geological research of its time. Haidinger's unselfish attitude is best reflected in his motto: Förderung der Wissenschaft, nicht Monopolisirung der Arbeit (Advancement of science, not monopolisation of research).

== Political activity ==
According to Döll (1871), Wilhelm Haidinger played a major role in the founding of the "k. k. Geographischen Gesellschaft zu Wien" (Becker, 1871 mentions how Haidinger had started the Austrian Geographical Society after the example of the famous Royal Geographical Society of London); the Werner-Verein zur geologischen Durchforschung Mährens und Schlesiens, the Geologischer Verein für Ungarn in Pest, the Società Geologica in Milan, Italy, and its successor the Società Italiana di Scienze naturali. Haidinger remained convinced that such scientific organizations outside the official governmental societies were necessary, if not essential.

In 1860 Wilhelm Haidinger read in the Wiener-Zeitung that his "k. k. Geologischer Reichsanstalt" was going to be incorporated into the "Kaiserlichen Akademie der Wissenschaften". Haidinger was shocked, not only because he had to read this news in the paper, but especially because the two institutes were truly incompatible. After several months of great uncertainty, the Imperial government, the Reichsrath, decided to cancel the planned forceful unification. Thus, Haidinger was able to continue his work at the Imperial Geological Survey. With considerable pride Wilhelm Haidinger related, how Emperor Franz-Josef of Austria-Hungary had visited the building of the k. k. Geologischer Reichsanstalt in Vienna on 15 February 1862. In 1866, Wilhelm Haidinger became seriously ill and asked the government for early retirement; it was generously granted. After retirement, he continued his studies at home, when meteorites held his main interest (and several papers followed).

== Awards and honours ==
Emperor Franz Josef I of Austria-Hungary bestowed great honour onto Wilhelm Haidinger: the Order of Franz Joseph and the Order of Leopold with his elevation to knighthood ("Ritter von Haidinger") on 30 July 1864. Haidinger had received from the King of Prussia on 24 January 1857 the highly coveted civil version of the Königlich Preußischer Orden "Pour le Mérite".Wilhelm Karl Ritter von Haidinger | ORDEN POUR LE MÉRITE Furthermore, the King of Bavaria bestowed the Bavarian Maximilian Order for Science and Art; the King of Sweden gave the Nordstern Orden; and the King of Portugal made Wilhelm Haidinger Commander in the Portuguese Order of Christ. Although Wilhelm Haidinger had never completed his academic training, he was promoted to doctor honoris causa in philosophy by the Charles University in Prague and to doctor honoris causa in medicine by the University of Jena (see: Von Wurzbach, 1861).

After a short illness, Wilhelm Haidinger died at his home in Vienna on 19 March 1871.

== Optical research ==
- Haidinger fringes

== See also ==
- Haidinger's brush
