= Eduard Magnus =

German painter (1799–1872)

Self-portrait (1827), Alte Nationalgalerie

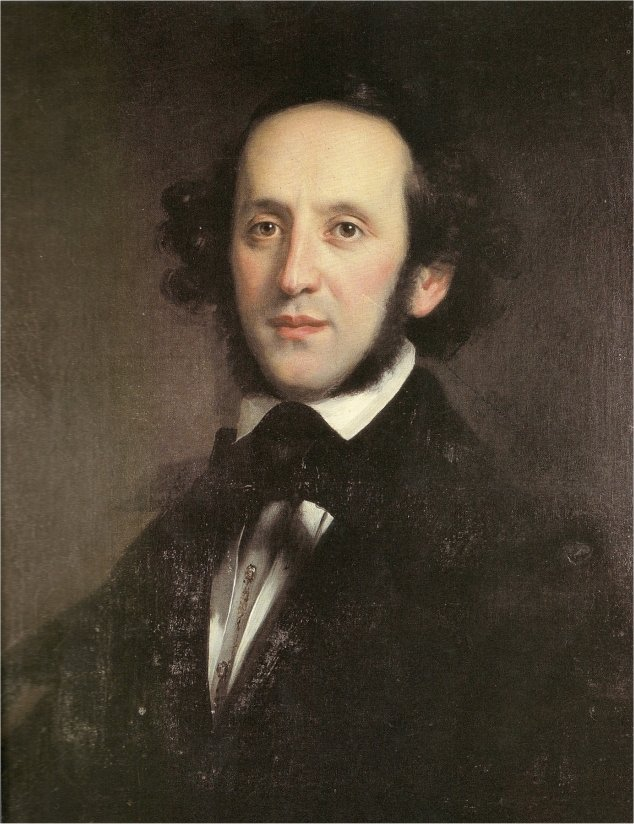
Portrait of Felix Mendelssohn (1846)

Eduard Magnus (January 7, 1799 – August 8, 1872) was a German painter, primarily known for portraits.

== Biography ==
Magnus was born in Berlin as the third son of Johann Matthias Magnus, the founder of the Prussian Magnus-Bank. He studied simultaneously at the Prussian Academy of Arts, Bauakademie, and University of Berlin, becoming educated in medicine, architecture, and philosophy. He took to painting, as a student of Jakob Schlesinger, exhibiting for the first time in 1826 with promising results. He later traveled to Paris and Italy, returning to Germany in 1829. He went to Italy again in 1831, and traveled through Paris and England before returning again in 1835. In 1837 he became a member of the Academy of Art, and in 1844 a professor. From 1850 to 1853 he traveled to France and Spain. He died in 1872 in Berlin. He was for a time the preeminent portrait painter in Berlin.

Eduard Magnus, who was Jewish, was the elder brother of the physicist and chemist Heinrich Gustav Magnus.

== Works ==
In Italy, Magnus produced two paintings, entitled The Return of the Palikaren, and The Benediction of the Grandson, which won him considerable renown.

Amongst his productions in the genre school, most of which have been engraved by Mandel, Trossin, and others, Two Young Girls at Sunrise and Two Children are prominent. He also painted portraits, amongst others, of Jenny Lind, Henriette Sontag, Mendelssohn Bartholdy, and the Prussian General Field Marshal Wrangel. Magnus gained a high reputation as a portrait painter, his productions in this department being marked by strong individuality and powerful colouring.

The Golden Age is also a notable work, distinguished by great natural simplicity, reminiscent of Sir Joshua Reynolds's pictures of a similar class of subject. It was one of the most attractive works exhibited at the Prussian Academy of Arts in 1839. It was purchased by the Art-Union Society of that city, and at the distribution of prizes fell to the lot of the Baron Werther, Minister of Foreign Affairs. It was afterwards engraved by Edward Mandel for the Society, who distributed it among their subscribers in 1843.

== Writings ==
- Ueber Einrichtung und Beleuchtung von Räumen zur Aufstellung von Gemälden und Sculpturen (On the arrangement and lighting of spaces for the display of paintings and sculpture; Berlin, 1864)
- Die Polychromie vom künstlerischen Standpunkte (Polychromy from an artistic standpoint; Bonn, 1872).
