= Daniel Morlot =

Swiss politician (1596–1670)

- Baptised: 11 March 1596; Bern, Switzerland
- Died: December 1670
- Occupation: Politician
- Spouses: Rosina Steiger (m. 1623) Katharina Michel (m. 1636)

Daniel Morlot (baptized 11 March 1596 – December 1670) was a Bernese politician. He was bailiff of Romainmôtier and of Morges, became a member of the Small Council in 1661, and was banneret (Venner) in 1670.

== Biography ==
Daniel Morlot was a member of the Morlot family. He was the son of Marc, the city physician (Stadtarzt), and Marthe Honorat. In 1623 he married Rosina Steiger, of the "white" Steiger family, daughter of Johannes Steiger, and in 1636 he married Katharina Michel, daughter of the bailiff (Landvogt) Beat Ludwig. His brother Theodor (1593–1661) also became a member of the Small Council. With his sons the family divided into two lines: the elder line of Johann (1630–1709) and the younger line of David (1640–1692), to which Franz Ludwig Morlot and Samuel Morlot belonged.

Morlot made a career in politics and administration. From 1629 he was a member of the Grand Council, from 1634 to 1640 bailiff of Romainmôtier, from 1645 to 1651 bailiff of Morges, from 1661 a member of the Small Council, from 1668 to 1670 master of the arsenal (Zeugherr vom Rat), and in 1670 banneret of the butchers' guild (zu Metzgern). He died in office in December 1670, probably in Bern.

== Bibliography ==
- B. von Rodt, Genealogien burgerlicher Geschlechter der Stadt Bern, 4, 92 (manuscript, 1950, Burgerbibliothek Bern)
