= Weilersteußlingen =

Village in Baden-Württemberg, Germany

Coordinates: 48°20′N 9°39′E

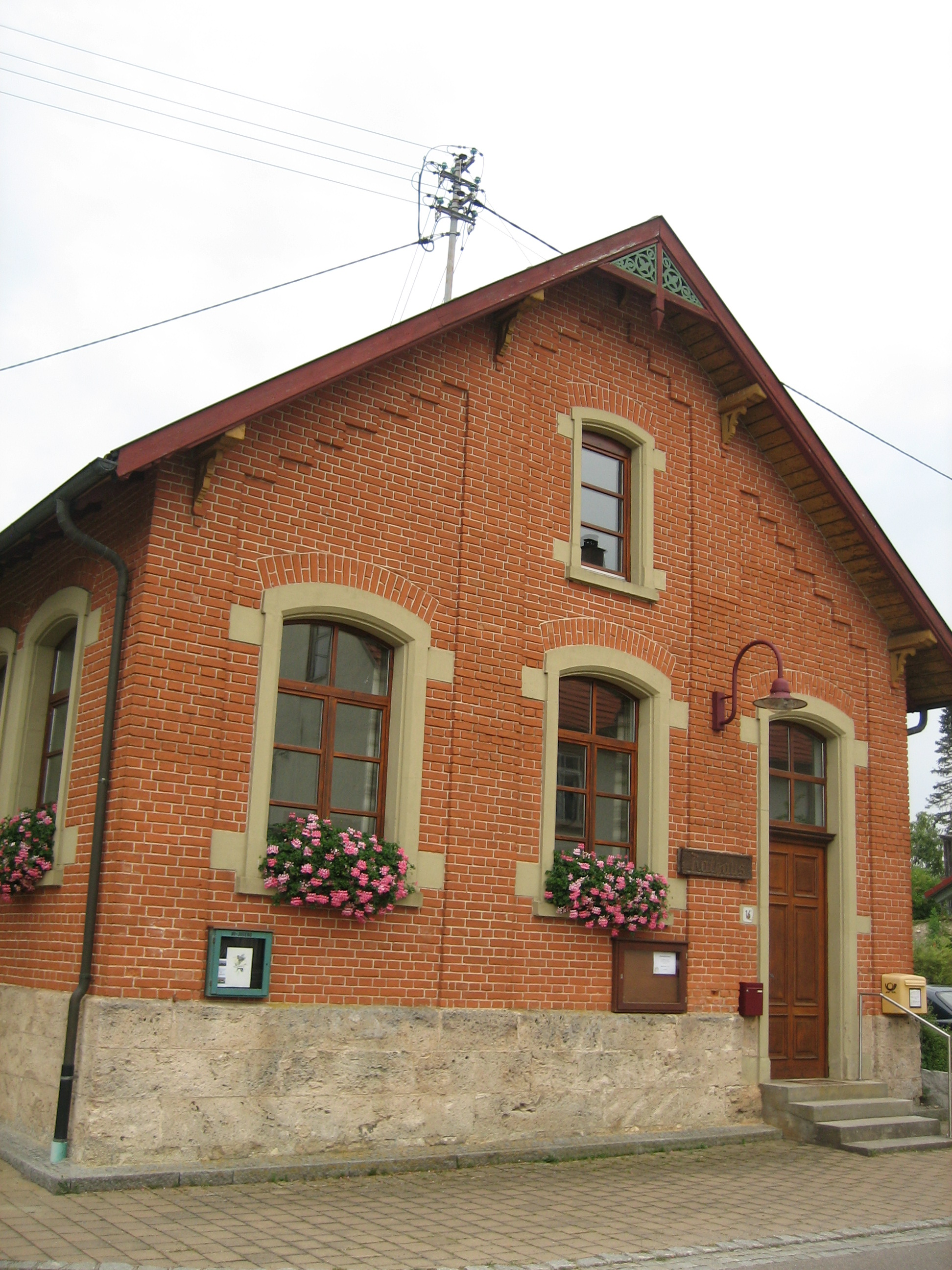
Weilersteußlingen

Weilersteußlingen is a small village in the Alb-Donau district, in Baden-Württemberg, Germany. As part of a merge in Baden-Württemberg alongside with the hamlet Ermelau, it was incorporated in Allmendingen since January 1, 1974. As of December 31, 2025, the population has 236 residents; 122 male and 114 female.
