= Elisabeth Studer-von Goumoëns =

Swiss nurse, editor and women's rights activist (1878–1970)

- Studer-von Goumoëns around 1910, photographed by Hermann Linck
- Born: Marie Bertha Elisabeth von Goumoëns; 4 November 1878; Bern, Switzerland
- Died: 24 April 1970 (aged 91); Berlingen, Switzerland
- Other name: Elisabeth Studer-de Goumoëns
- Occupations: Nurse; editor; women's rights activist
- Known for: Editor of the Schweizer Frauenblatt, 1945–1956
- Spouse: Kaspar Arnold Studer (m. 1906)
- Children: 5
- Relatives: Eduard von Goumoëns (brother)

Elisabeth Studer-von Goumoëns, in French Elisabeth Studer-de Goumoëns, born Marie Bertha Elisabeth von Goumoëns (4 November 1878 – 24 April 1970), was a Swiss nurse, editor, and women's rights activist. She was a founder of social welfare organizations in Winterthur, sat on the board of the Swiss Association for Women's Suffrage, and edited the women's weekly Schweizer Frauenblatt from 1945 to 1956.

== Early life and nursing ==
Marie Bertha Elisabeth von Goumoëns grew up in Bern and at Worb Castle, in a patrician family of Bern and Vaud, the von Goumoëns. Her parents were Ludwig Eugen Eduard von Goumoëns, a life insurance agent and property manager, and Sophie Bertha née Wyss. Of her two siblings, her elder brother Eduard von Goumoëns became known as an engineer, a company director, and director of the Federal Food Office.

From 1902 she trained for three years at the Schweizerische Pflegerinnenschule, a nursing school for women in Zurich. In 1905 she took a post as a nurse in the isolation unit of the cantonal hospital in Winterthur, where patients with highly contagious diseases were treated in isolation. In 1906 she married the physician Kaspar Arnold Studer, with whom she moved to Winterthur the same year and ran a medical practice there. Four of their five children, born between 1907 and 1916, reached adulthood, among them Adelheid Studer, later a historian and the wife of Marcel Beck.

== Social work in Winterthur ==
In Winterthur, Studer-von Goumoëns worked on behalf of people with leprosy, nursed soldiers with influenza during World War I, and took Polish refugees into her home during World War II. With her husband she founded the town's tuberculosis welfare service, and she was active in the temperance movement. In 1919 she initiated the Frauenhilfe Winterthur, a women's aid organization from which the Frauenzentrale Winterthur, the town's women's association liaison center, later emerged.

From 1922 to 1930 she was one of the first women on the Winterthur district school board (Kreisschulpflege). She sat on the nursing committee of the Schweizerische Pflegerinnenschule mit Frauenspital in Zurich and wrote the publication marking the school's 25th anniversary.

== Women's rights and journalism ==
At the national level, Studer-von Goumoëns campaigned for women's political and economic equality, and from 1928 to 1940 she sat on the board of the Swiss Association for Women's Suffrage (SVF). Her comedy Wi der Herr Chräbs gmurbet het, presented in 1928 at the first Swiss Exhibition for Women's Work (SAFFA), dealt with women's suffrage and with the possibility and consequences of a women's strike.

From 1925 she was a member of the newly founded cooperative council of the political weekly Schweizer Frauenblatt. As a member of its board and editorial committee she had a strong influence on the paper, a publication of the Swiss women's movement, and she was its president from 1930 to 1939. At the end of July 1945 she succeeded Iris von Roten, then Iris Meyer, as editor. Her first article of her own in the paper, published on 10 August 1945, dealt with women's voting rights in the canton of Zurich. She wrote many political and socially critical articles before stepping down in 1956 on account of her age.

Elisabeth Studer-von Goumoëns died in Berlingen in April 1970, aged 91, ten months before women won the right to vote and stand for election at the federal level. Her social and political work left its mark on Winterthur and helped prepare the ground for the introduction of women's suffrage in Switzerland.

== Works ==
- 25 Jahre Schweizerische Pflegerinnenschule mit Frauenspital in Zürich, 1901–1926, 1926
- Wi der Herr Chräbs gmurbet het. Luschtspiel i drei Szene, 1928
- "Eduard von Goumoëns 1874–1959", in Schweizer Pioniere der Wirtschaft und Technik, 12, 1961, 57–88

== Bibliography ==
- A. Peyer, Zeitspiegel Frau Schweizer Frauenblatt. Geschichte und Entwicklung eines der ältesten Erzeugnisse der Schweizer Frauenpresse, 1990 (typescript)
- R. Zürcher, Von Frauen für Frauen. Fünf Solidaritätswerke der Schweizer Frauenbewegung: SAFFA 1928 – Saffa 1958, 1999
- Der Landbote, 29 April 1970 (obituary); 6 February 2021
- K. Moeschlin, N. Pettannice, "Das Frauenstimmrecht: Befreiung oder Bedrohung?", in Winterthurer Jahrbuch, 2022, 112–115

=== Archives ===
- Archives cantonales vaudoises, Chavannes-près-Renens, Elisabeth Studer-de Goumoëns
- Archiv Gosteli-Foundation, Worblaufen, Elisabeth Studer de Goumoens
- Winterthurer Bibliotheken, Winterthur, Sammlung Winterthur, Elisabeth Studer-von Goumoëns
