= Adolph von Morlot =

Italian-Swiss scientist

Adolph von Morlot (also: Charles Adolph de Morlot; see Note 1) (5 April 1820 – 10 February 1867) was a scientist who specialized in geology and later in archaeology. He was born in Naples, Kingdom of the Two Sicilies and died in Bern, Switzerland (Note 2). Von Morlot is known for performing the first ever high-temperature synthesis of the mineral dolomite and known by archaeologists as one of the pioneers of underwater archaeology. He was elected as a member to the American Philosophical Society in 1864.

== Scientific career ==
Von Morlot was born into a well-to-do family, living in Bern, Switzerland. In the 17th century his family had moved from the Lorraine region of France to Switzerland. Because Adolph's grandfather had not been able to afford to pay for the possible procurement of a good position for all of his three sons (the family fortune had been decimated as the result of the French Revolution), Adolph's father had to study medicine and had started working as a family doctor in Bern. His father's marriage to the wealthy English lady Constance Ingleby freed him from further financial troubles (Note 3). The marriage between Mark Theodore de (or: von) Morlot (Note 4) and Constance Ingleby was blessed with the births of Karl Adolph and of his sister Margaretha Elisabeth Adolfine. The education of Adolph von Morlot started out at a public school in Gottstatt, near Biel/Bienne, Switzerland; during 1835 and 1836 he visited the municipal "Realschule"of Bern, where he developed a definite liking for mathematics. Eighteen years old Adolph von Morlot entered the University of Bern; not only to pursue his interests in mathematics, but also to study geology (under professor Bernhard Studer) and to take part in geological excursions. However, he felt the need for a better education in especially mathematics and in the autumn of 1838 he went to the Collège Sainte Barbe in Paris, which held a reputation for teaching mathematics. In 1843 Von Morlot went to Freiberg, Germany to study ore mining. At the suggestion of professor Bernhard von Cotta of Freiberg, Adolph von Morlot was asked to join the newly formed "Geognotisch-montanistischen Verein für Innerösterreich und das Land ob der Enns". The intention of this society, organized at the instigation of Erzherzog Johann von Österreich, was to study the geology of said part of Austria-Hungary. In the summer of 1844 Von Morlot moved to Vienna, where he started working at the "Kaiserlich-Königliches Hof-Mineraliencabinet", which was housed in the same building as that of the upcoming "Kaiserlich-Königliches Montanistisches Museum" of Wilhelm Haidinger. According to Wurzbach's "Biographisches Lexikon" Adolph von Morlot immediately felt at home in his new surroundings: the open and honest discussions greatly stimulated his lively, albeit independent mind. In the years that followed many publications on the regional geology of various parts of Austria from his hand appeared, including work on a new geological map. In 1844 Von Morlot travelled to Graz in order to assist in the activities of the "Geognostisch-montanistischen Verein für Innerösterreich und das Land ob der Enns", and there he met for example fellow scientists (phyto-paleontologist) Franz Unger and (mining specialist) Peter Ritter von Tunner. From Graz Von Morlot went to Salzburg, where he was introduced to Erzherzog Johann von Österreich, after which he travelled to Switzerland to visit his family. The 1844 journey ultimately took him to Freiberg, where Von Morlot again took up his studies of ore mining techniques. Meanwhile, in Graz the general assembly of the "Geognostisch-montanistischen Verein für Innerösterreich und das Land ob der Enns" had decided to appoint Adolph von Morlot as its "Vereinscommisar". Although his new appointment required him to live in Graz, Von Morlot tried his best to move to Vienna. On 2 June 1846 he held his first lecture at a meeting of the "Freunde der Naturwissenschaften" (the scientific society founded by Wilhelm Haidinger). What followed were five years in Vienna, devoted during the summer to field studies in geology and to scientific work in winter time.

== Dolomite synthesis ==
During his years in Vienna Adolph von Morlot performed a series of experiments (most probably at the request of Wilhelm Haidinger) to try and synthesize the mineral dolomite. Von Morlot (1847 A) started out his first paper on dolomite synthesis with stating, that Giovanni Arduino (1779) had been the first scientist to suggest the (high-temperature) conversion of limestone into dolomite. The chemical process would consist of a high-temperature reaction between limestone and magnesium. Furthermore, Von Morlot (1847 A) expressed his astonishment over the fact, that Arduino had ventured to postulate this far-reaching chemical process for the formation of dolomite merely on the basis of field observations only. At the same time Von Morlot mentioned the (field) observations made by Leopold von Buch (1824), who had found fossils in what once must have been limestone, but that now consisted of dolomite. From which it had been concluded, that some large-scale process must have changed limestone into dolomite. Von Buch (1824) had invoked "magnesia vapours" to explain the transition, but Von Morlot thought such a process unlikely, because it must have taken place at extremely high temperatures, which should have left other tell-tale changes in the limestone and the dolomite. At this point Adolph von Morlot introduced the view of Wilhelm Haidinger, who while writing on pseudomorphosis, had suggested that the change of limestone into dolomite would have taken place through the reaction of a solution of magnesium sulphate with the calcium carbonate of the limestone. The reaction products would be the double carbonate of calcium and magnesium (= dolomite) and a solution of calcium sulphate. After explaining the reaction, Von Morlot reminded his readers, that in chemistry only the reverse reactions was known (Note 5). Citing from Haidinger's own paper (1844) Von Morlot repeated the observation made by three well-known chemists of that time Friedrich Wöhler, Eilhardt Mitscherlich and Leopold Gmelin, that powdered dolomite reacts with a solution of calcium sulphate in water to give calcium carbonate powder in a solution of magnesium sulphate. Wilhelm Haidinger had admitted to Von Morlot (Note 6), that this must be the reaction that really takes place at room temperature (of around 25 °C), but at the same time he had suggested to Von Morlot that the change from calcium carbonate into dolomite would take place in the deeper realms of the earth, that is to say at elevated temperatures and under high pressure. All that was needed to prove the theory of Haidinger were a few laboratory experiments, as Von Morlot (1847 A) put it. The outlines of such experiments had been discussed between Wilhelm Haidinger and Friedrich Wöhler in 1843, and although Wöhler had started some experiments, he could not finish these because of his departure to Graz. As Von Morlot related, he himself took over the experiments of Wöhler in the winter of 1846. The various experiments were all conducted in a laboratory of the "k.k. Hofkammer im Münz- und Bergwesen" (Note 7). The laboratory syntheses of dolomite by Von Morlot involved finely powdered, pure calcite crystals mixed with a quantity of magnesium sulphate heptahydrate. The mixture was enclosed in a rather thick glass tube, which was closed by melting its open end. The glass tube was heated in an oil bath to a temperature of 200° Reamur (= 250 °C). The high pressure developing inside the glass tube was prevented from blowing it up through fitting it in a (steel) gun barrel filled up with fine sand. Von Morlot obtained only indirect evidence, that in these experiments dolomite had been formed; the mineral as such could not be isolated and identified. But the transition of the magnesium sulphate that had been present at the start of the experiment, into calcium sulphate indicated a fundamental change had taken place. Von Morlot (1847 A) claimed that 232 milligram of dolomite must have been formed, but his conclusion was based only on calculations and not only actual measurement. Only later, in a second paper published in 1847, Von Morlot could claim real success in synthesizing the mineral dolomite in the laboratory. After applying the rather simple method of adding dilute hydrochloric acid to distinguish between calcium carbonate and dolomite to the powder obtained in his high-temperature / high-pressure experiments, Von Morlot (1847 B) noted that not all of the precipitate would dissolve. Therefore, Von Morlot, somewhat hesitantly, suggested that dolomite had formed in his experiments. His doubt was not shared by Wilhelm Haidinger, who added as the last words to Von Morlot's paper (once more published in Haidinger's own "Berichte über die Mittheilungen von Freunden der Naturwissenschaften in Wien"), that there was no need at all for doubt: these experiments had clearly brought an answer through hard work in the laboratory.

== Archaeology ==
According to Franz von Hauer's account in the 1867 issue of the "Verhandlungen der Kaiserlich-Königlichen Geologischen Reichsanstalt" negative experiences with the internal politics of Imperial Austria-Hungary made Von Morlot decide to return to his native Switzerland. In 1850 Von Morlot had been dismissed from his position as the secretary of the "Geognostisch-montanistischen Verein für Innerösterreich und das Land ob der Enns", and his attempts to find employment at the "Geologische Reichsanstalt" in Vienna had been thwarted. In the summer of 1851 Adolph von Morlot left Austria, never to return. After his return to Switzerland Von Morlot, with the help of his father, became a professor in geology and mineralogy at the University of Lausanne (from 1851 to 1854). The second scientific career of Adolph von Morlot started out in Switzerland around 1860. Under the influence of archaeologist Frédéric-Louis Troyon (1815-1866) (for the latter's biography see: Rapin (1966)). After his success in synthesizing dolomite in the laboratory, Von Morlot now earned fame by performing the very first act of underwater archaeology by diving into Lake Geneva (on 24 August 1854) near Morges, Switzerland (Note 8) and exploring for remnants of prehistoric lake dwellings (see for example: Corboud, 2004.) As Corboud (2004) stressed, this dive only became possible because of Adolph von Morlot's ingenuity in designing and constructing his own diving helmet and hand-operated air pump. (Corboud, 2004 described how he had re-constructed Von Morlot's diving helmet and, during an actual dive in the same lake in 2001, found it to be not particularly well suited for underwater observations.) During the years devoted to archaeology Von Morlot visited Copenhagen (Denmark) and Lund (Sweden). His findings were recorded in the booklet "Études géologiques en Danemark et en Suisse". Von Morlot's studies and publications had such great effect on Danish scientists in this (new) field, that the King of Denmark bestowed the Danebrog-Orden on Adolph von Morlot (as Von Gümbel, 1885 related in the "Allgemeine Deutsche Biographie": see Note 1). From 1865 to 1867 Adolph von Morlot worked as the "Konservator" (custodian) of the archaeological collection of the city of Bern, now known as the Bernisches Historisches Museum. During these last years, the relentless Adolph von Morlot also occupied himself with investigating and re-creating ancient music instruments. As Chavannes (1867) stressed, Von Morlot had always been greatly interested in music. After his prolonged journey into Sweden and Denmark, Von Morlot made two shorter visits to Northern Germany (one to Schwerin, and a second one to Hallstadt). While writing a memoir on the archaeology of Northern Germany, Adolph von Morlot unexpectedly died on 10 February in Bern, Switzerland, only 47 years old.

== Publications ==
What is said to be Von Morlot's first paper (on glaciers) appeared in the "Wiener Zeitung" (Note 9) of 11 and 12 September 1844. An account on "Der Gletscher des Wiener Beckens" was printed on p. 1866 of the "Wiener Zeitung" of 11 September 1844 and its sequel on pp. 1873-1874 of the next day's paper. However, at the end of it Wilhelm Haidinger is mentioned as its author. Nonetheless, Haidinger did acknowledge Von Morlot's contributions on the subject. Von Morlot published according to the "Catalogue of Scientific Papers" some 61 different papers. According to a listing in Wurzbach's Lexikon (1868) two geological maps, four books and some 216 papers have been published by Von Morlot. The books are: "Erläuterungen zur Geologischen Uebersichtskarte der nordöstlichen Alpen" (1847, Braumüller & Seidel, Wien, 86 p.), "Leçon d'ouverture d'un cours sur la haute Antiquité, fait à l'Académie de Lausanne en Novembre et Décembre 1860" (1861, Impr. C. Pache-Simmen, Lausanne, 14 p.) and "Études géologico-archéologiques en Danemark et en Suisse" (1860, F. Blanchard, Lausanne, 64 p.). More books can be found in the worldwide catalogue of OCLC's worldcat.org. For example: Ueber die geologischen Verhältnisse von Istrien mit Berücksichtigung Dalmatiens und der angrenzenden Gegenden Croatiens, Unterkrains und des Görzer Kreises (1848), Braumüller und Seidel, Wien, 33 p.; Allgemeine Bemerkungen über die Altertumskunde (1859), Haller, Bern, 15 p.; General views on archaeology (1861), Congressional Globe Office, Washington, 62 p.; Sur le passage de l'âge de la pierre à l'âge du bronze et sur les métaux employés dans l'âge du bronze (1866), Thiele, Copenhagen, 38 p.; l'Archéologie du Mecklenbourg comparée à celle de l'Europe Centrale. Première Partie. Âge de la pierre (1868), Herzog, Zürich, 41 p.; but at closer look these are all reprints of papers that originally appeared in various science journals.

== Notes ==
1: The present article is based mainly on the texts of the necrology by Chavannes (1867), the biography of Adolph von Morlot as printed on pp. 96–100 in C. von Wurzbach's "Biographisches Lexikon des Kaiserthums Oesterreich, enthalten die Lebensskizzen der denkwürdigen Personen, welche seit 1750 in den österreichischen Kronländern geboren wurden oder darin gelebt und gewirkt haben. Neunzehnter Theil (Moll - Mysliveczk). Druck und Verlag der k.k. Hof- und Staatsdruckerei, Wien, 518 p. (1868)" and on Von Gümbel's contribution on Ch. Adolph von Morlot in the "Allgemeine Deutsche Biographie", (1885), volume 22, pp. 325–327, Verlag von Duncker & Humblot, Leipzig. .

2: Most publications on Karl Adolph von Morlot tend to follow Chavannes'(1867) necrology and mention 22 March 1820 as the date of his birth; perhaps more confidence should be placed in the date of 5 April 1820 given by the genealogy data base of the old families of Bern, "Berner Geschlechter" , the more so because the latter site gives the full names of his father, mother and sister, lacking in most other biographies.

3: Constance, the youngest daughter of Sir John Ingleby of Ripley Park, Yorkshire, had been born in July 1795 and married Mark Theodore de Morlot MD on 5 July 1819 in Koniz, Switzerland. (see: The European Magazine and London Review (1819), vol.76, p. 177.)

4: In the course of time, Von Morlot's name has been printed in several ways; the "Katalog der Deutschen Nationalbibliothek" lists his name as: Adolph Morlot, Adolf Morlot, Adolphe Morlot, Charles Adolphe Morlot, Ch. Adolphe von Morlot, A. Morlot, A. v. Morlot, Charles Adolphe von Morlot and Adolphe Morlot. It must be realized, that in Switzerland four different languages are officially recognized, among which German and French.

5: "Aber die Chemie weist gerade die entgegengesetzte Reaktion auf": Von Morlot (1847 A, p. 309).

6: As stated by Von Morlot (1847 A, p. 310): "Ja, sagt Haidinger, unter dem einfachen Luftdruck und bei gewöhnlicher Temperatur geschieht das auch in der Natur, wie es die Pseudomorphosen von Kalkspath nach Dolomit zeigen, die Rauchwacke sogar, die jetzt Kalkstein ist, war früher Dolomit."

7: At first look the combination of coins and mining in one government office may seem somewhat unusual. However, when realizing that the Austria-Hungarian Empire relied ever since the first half of the 18th century on a mercantile economic system, the mystery is easily solved. The silver and gold needed to make coins had to be mined within the borders of Austria-Hungary itself. The "k.k. Hofkammer in Münz- und Bergwesen" was in practice a major part of the Austrian Department of Finance. The search for silver and gold was relegated to those young men, who had successfully absolved the "Bergakademie" of Schemnitz (now: Banská Štiavnica). Later the training of future employees took place in Vienna, in the newly instituted "Montanistisches Museum", where Friedrich Mohs, formerly professor at Freiberg, taught from 1826 to 1839. (see also: Weiß,1966)

8: A hand-coloured drawing depicting this pioneering act of underwater archaeology by Messrs. Von Morlot (under water), Frédéric Troyon and François-Alfonse Forel (both in the rowing boat) can be found at this link

9: The "Oesterreichisch-Kaiserlich privilegirten Wiener Zeitung" is one of the oldest daily papers of the world (founded 8 August 1703), and exists up to the present day. The paper contains a section with government announcements called the "Amts-Blatt". Many of the (historical) issues of the "Wiener Zeitung" are freely available at .
