= Karl Haidinger =

Austrian mineralogist and geologist

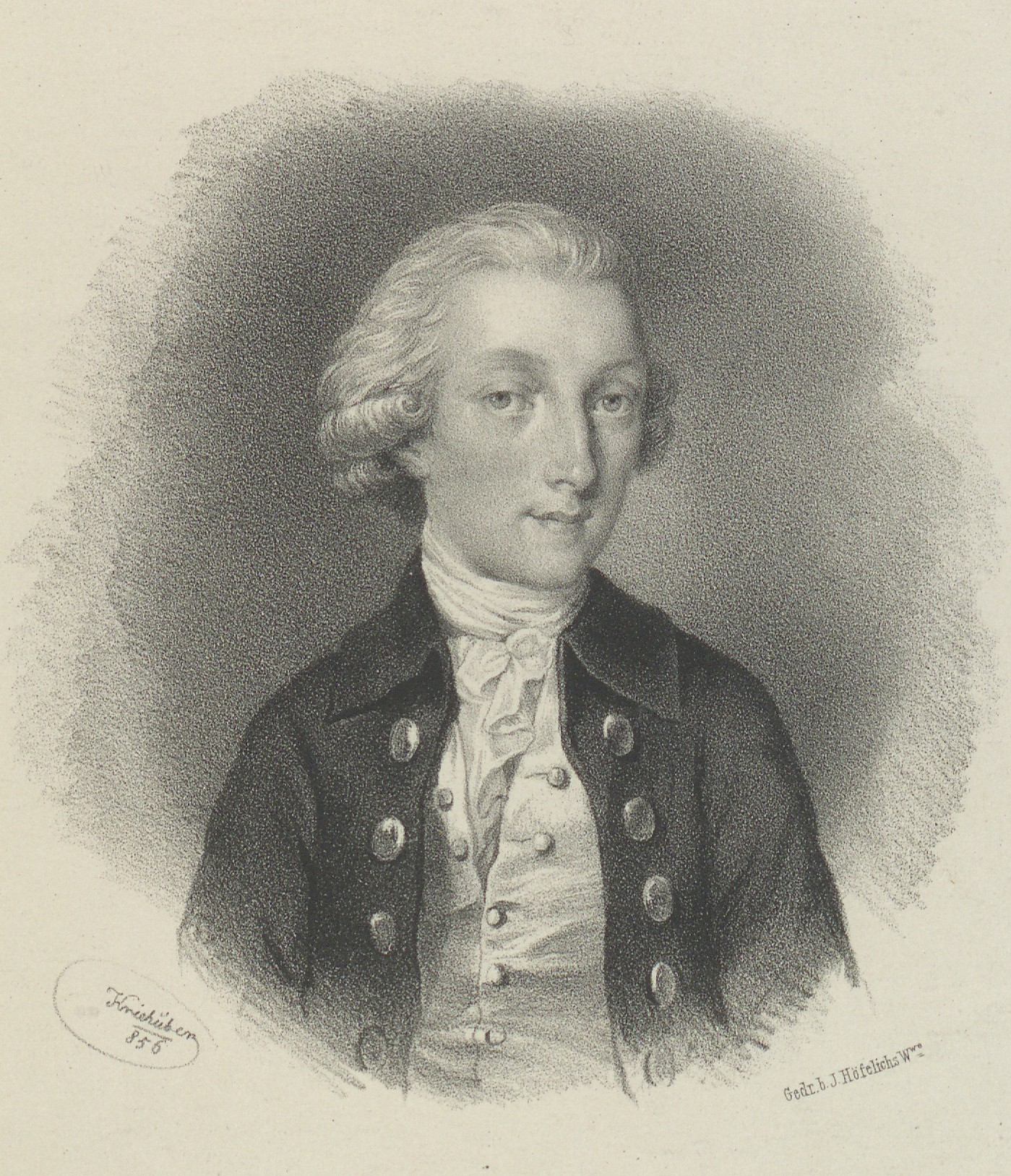
Karl Haidinger, 1856

Karl Haidinger (10 July 1756, Vienna – 16 March 1797, Vienna), was an Austrian mineralogist and geologist.

From 1780 onwards, Haidinger was employed at the "Kaiserlich-Königliches Naturalien Cabinet". One of the collections of the Cabinet was of rocks and minerals; in 1782 Karl Haidinger published a book on that part of the collection.

In addition to his classification activities, Karl Haidinger engaged in scientific research on, for example, the metallurgical amalgamation process, and taught its application to mining engineers in Schemnitz, now known as Banská Štiavnica in Slovakia. Several of his papers were published in Ignaz Edler von Born's science magazine Physikalische Arbeiten der einträchtigen Freunde in Wien and in the Sitzungsberichte der kaiserlichen Akademie der Wissenschaften in Wien. One of Karl Haidinger's papers, "Entwurf einer systematischen Eintheilung der Gebirgsarten" won a first prize in the 1785 competition organized by the Imperial Academy of Sciences and Arts of St. Petersburg, Russia and was published separately as a book.

To gain more knowledge of the latest developments in science and technology, Karl Haidinger took part in an official visit to England in 1795, with other scientists in government service. The planning and the construction of canals, the production and use of steam engines, the iron casting process, and the manufacture of porcelain were studied. After his return to Vienna, Karl Haidinger started to write his part of the reports, but his task was never finished. His son Wilhelm, who was born two years before his death, carried on his mineralogical work.
