= Viscosuisse =

Swiss man-made fiber manufacturer (1906–2006)

- Formerly: Société de la Viscose Suisse
- Industry: Textiles
- Founded: 1906
- Defunct: 2006
- Headquarters: Emmen, Switzerland
- Products: Artificial silk; viscose staple fiber; tire yarn; nylon

Viscosuisse was a Swiss manufacturer of man-made fibers based in Emmen. Founded in 1906 at Emmenbrücke, it was the first Swiss company to produce nylon. It ceased to exist in 2006.

== History ==
The company was founded in 1906 at Emmenbrücke as a subsidiary of the French business group Ernest Carnot. In 1922 it was converted into a joint-stock company under Swiss law, the Société de la Viscose Suisse, which took the name Viscosuisse in 1976. After experimental beginnings, from 1908 it produced artificial silk yarn from wood cellulose. The company expanded rapidly, and in 1924 a factory was built at Widnau. Eduard von Goumoëns had opened the factory at Emmenbrücke (Viscose Emmenbrücke) in 1906 on behalf of the Société française de la viscose and became its director.

After a sales crisis and a temporary shutdown from 1931 to 1935, the company grew again during World War II, and in 1941 it began producing viscose staple fiber (Zellwolle). In 1947 Viscosuisse took over Steckborn Kunstseide AG, and from 1948 it made viscose yarn for car tires. Thanks to its links with the French company Rhône-Poulenc, it was the first Swiss company to produce nylon, and it subsequently held a monopoly in Switzerland. Viscose production ended in 1980.

Because of global restructuring, from 1989 Viscosuisse was increasingly integrated into large international groups. Job cuts followed. The workforce numbered 60 in 1906, 800 in 1914, 2,400 in 1924, 5,500 in 1973, 2,003 in 1980, and 360 in 2006. After several changes of name, the company ceased to exist in 2006.

Viscosuisse pursued a pronounced company social policy (betriebliche Sozialpolitik) and encouraged its employees to identify with the firm. As a developer, property owner, and taxpayer, it influenced the development of the municipality of Emmen.

== Bibliography ==
- 50 Jahre Viscose Emmenbrücke, 1906–1956, 1956
- 75 Jahre Viscosuisse, 1981
- B. Schumacher, In Bewegung: Geschichte der Gemeinde Emmen, 2, 2004, 102–137, 236–251, 304
