= Marcel Beck =

Swiss historian and politician (1908–1986)

- Born: 16 April 1908; Bogotá, Colombia
- Died: 17 February 1986 (aged 77); Winterthur, Switzerland
- Occupations: Historian; politician
- Spouse: Adelheid Studer (m. 1933)
- Relatives: Elisabeth Studer-von Goumoëns (mother-in-law)

Marcel Beck (16 April 1908 – 17 February 1986) was a Swiss historian and politician. He was professor of medieval history at the University of Zurich from 1947 to 1978, and a member of the National Council from 1965 to 1967.

== Early life and academic career ==
Marcel Beck was born in Bogotá, the son of Robert Beck, a merchant, and Lotti née Haggenmacher. From 1926 he studied history, church history, and classical philology in Geneva, Zurich, and Munich, and he received his doctorate in 1932. In 1933 he married Adelheid Studer, daughter of the physician Caspar Studer and the women's rights activist Elisabeth née von Goumoëns. From 1933 to 1935 he was a research associate at the Berlin institute of the Monumenta Germaniae Historica, and from 1935 to 1937 at the Institut für geschichtliche Landeskunde (institute for historical regional studies) in Freiburg im Breisgau. From 1939 to 1947 he was a librarian at the Swiss National Library in Bern.

From 1947 to 1978 Beck was professor of medieval history at the University of Zurich. His main interests were historical spheres of life and culture and the forces at work in them, in the early and high Middle Ages, the Crusades, and Byzantium. He looked for answers to his questions exclusively in contemporary sources, and he opened new approaches to the origins of the Swiss Confederacy within the Empire. Beck was unsparing in his criticism of older and more recent historiography that obscured the view of events (the liberation tradition, William Tell). He made many trips to the Orient with students.

== Politics ==
As a member of the Democratic Party, of which he was cantonal president from 1961 to 1963, Beck sat in the Cantonal Council of Zurich from 1955 to 1963 and in the National Council from 1965 to 1967. He repeatedly took up subjects that were still taboo in his time, such as neutrality, the environment, Switzerland and Europe, and the election of the Federal Council. For many years he used his columns in two daily newspapers to argue his political concerns and his views on Swiss history with a sharp pen.

== Works ==
- Legende, Mythos und Geschichte. Die Schweiz und das europäische Mittelalter, 1978 (with bibliography)

== Bibliography ==
- Neue Zürcher Zeitung, 18 February 1986 (obituary); 30 July 2002
- H. F. Haefele, "Marcel Beck", in Deutsches Archiv für Erforschung des Mittelalters, 42, 1986, 387–389 (obituary)
- "Marcel Beck (1908–1986)", in Schweizerische Zeitschrift für Geschichte, 37, 1987, 109 (obituary)

=== Archives ===
- Winterthurer Bibliotheken, Winterthur, Sammlung Winterthur, Marcel Beck, 1950–1985
