= Schweizer Frauenblatt =

Feminist Swiss weekly newspaper published in German

The Schweizer Frauenblatt (Swiss Women's Journal) was a Swiss weekly journal in German. Its stated aim was to raise public awareness of the social, economic and political situation of women and to support women's suffrage. It was created in 1919 in Aarau. Elisabeth Thommen was the first editor in charge. After her departure in 1921, the weekly started to take a less radical editorial line. It was part of the Swiss Women's Societies Alliance from 1922 to 1964. Iris von Roten was editor from 1943 to 1945. She was succeeded at the end of July 1945 by Elisabeth Studer-von Goumoëns, who had been the journal's president from 1930 to 1939 and remained editor until 1956. The journal switched to a monthly schedule in 1974. In 1979, it changed its title to Mir Fraue, and in 1989 to Zeitspiegel der Frau. It was discontinued in 1990.
