= Allmendingen Castle, Bern =

Allmendingen Castle
- Schloss Allmendingen (German)
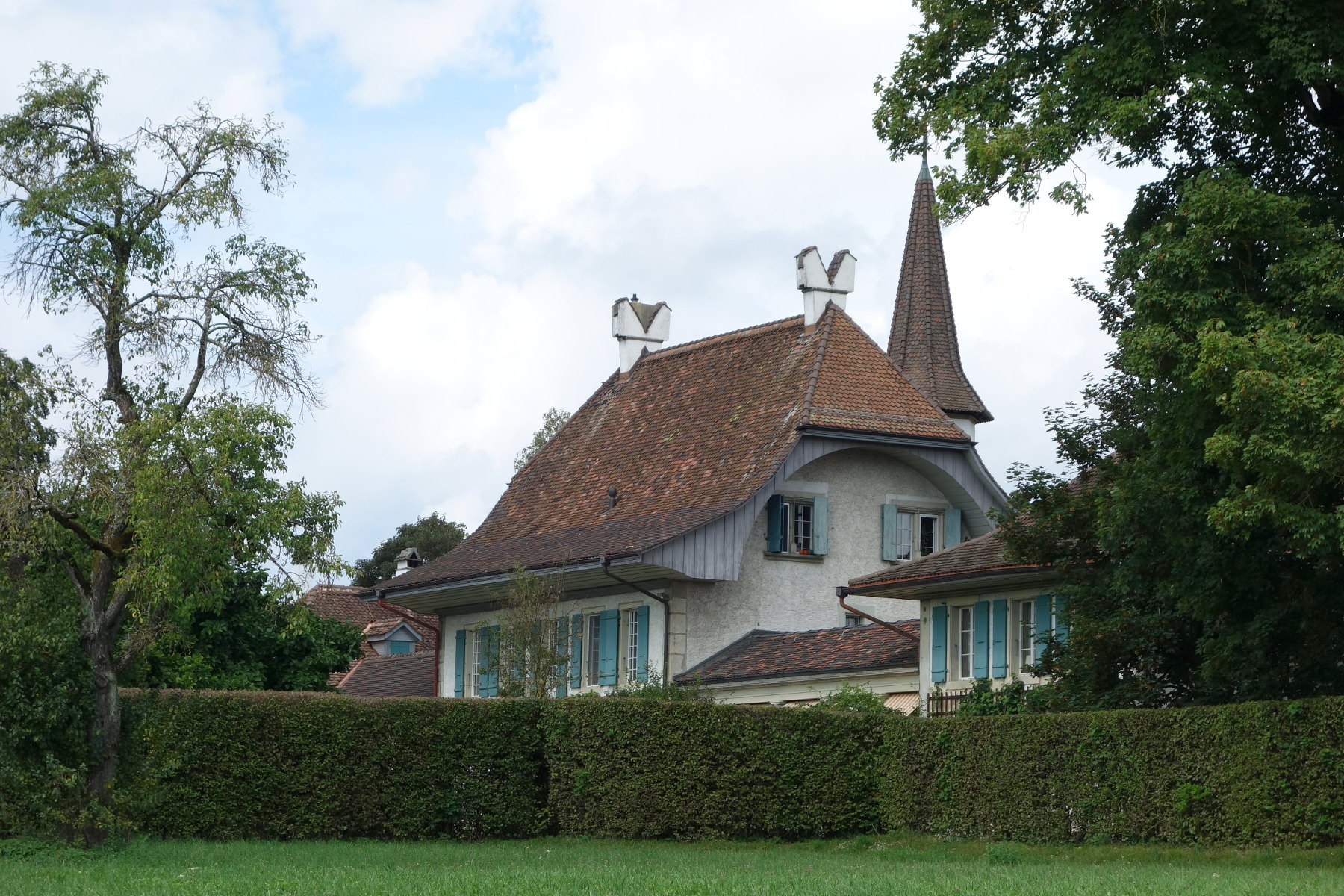
- Allmendingen Castle

- Allmendingen Castle in Switzerland Allmendingen Castle, Bern (Switzerland)
- 46°55′00″N 7°31′20″E
- Location: Allmendingen

History
- Built: Before 1239
- Built for: Lords of Allmendingen
- Demolished: 16th century
- Rebuilt: around 1607

Allmendingen Castle (German: Schloss Allmendingen) is a castle in the municipality of Allmendingen of the canton of Bern in Switzerland.

== History ==
The original Allmendingen Castle was built during the High Middle Ages probably for the Lords of Allmendingen or Alwandingen. Between 1239 and 1256 Rudolf von Alwandingen was mentioned in the record. In 1256 the Lords of Allmendingen sold both Allmendingen and the neighboring hamlet of Märchligen to Interlaken Monastery. The castle fell into disrepair and during the 16th century the cartographer Thomas Schöpf referred to it as a arx disruta or broken castle. In 1676 Albrecht Kauws mentioned the ruins of Alt-Allmendingen Castle and by 1729 the ruins were still visible. The old castle had walls that were about 2.1 meters (6.9 ft) and was a square with 9 meters (30 ft) long walls. The south and west side had no windows.

After the Protestant Reformation in 1528, Interlaken Monastery was secularized and its lands, including Allmendingen, were taken by Bern. A new Allmendingen Castle was built near the old castle during the 16th or 17th century. One clue as to the construction date is that a door in the tower bears the year 1607. The new castle was built for the Graffenried family in the Renaissance style. The tower was initially topped with a high pointed roof, which was later replaced with a lower one. In the 18th century, the castle was renovated by the Schultheiss Isaak Steiger and then by his son Franz Ludwig. They expanded the castle with a garden court yard and a connecting arbor.

On 17 September 1946 Winston Churchill visited Allmendingen Castle.

== See also ==
- List of castles in Switzerland
