= Eduard von Goumoëns =

Swiss engineer, industrialist and army officer (1874–1959)

- Born: 14 June 1874; Bern, Switzerland
- Died: 6 February 1959 (aged 84); Thun, Switzerland
- Occupations: Engineer; company director; army officer
- Spouse: Helene von Morlot

Eduard von Goumoëns (14 June 1874 – 6 February 1959) was a Swiss engineer, industrialist, and army officer. He was director of the artificial silk factory at Emmenbrücke that became Viscosuisse, and in 1918 he was director of the Federal Food Office.

== Biography ==
Eduard von Goumoëns was the son of Eduard von Goumoëns, estate manager for the Burgergemeinde (burgher community) of Bern, and Bertha née Wyss. He married Helene von Morlot, daughter of Albert von Morlot. He studied mechanical engineering in Dresden and Charlottenburg, and began his career as an instructor officer (Instruktionsoffizier) in the artillery.

In 1906, on behalf of the Société française de la viscose, he opened an artificial silk factory at Emmenbrücke (Viscose Emmenbrücke; from 1922 the Société de la Viscose Suisse; Viscosuisse), of which he became director. The company, which started with about thirty workers, employed 800 people in 1914 and 4,000 in 1956. In 1924 factories were opened at Widnau and at Gozzano in Piedmont. In 1950 Goumoëns introduced the manufacture of nylon in Switzerland, under the name Nylsuisse.

He was president of the Swiss association of artificial silk manufacturers (Schweizerischer Verband der Kunstseidenhersteller). From 1922 he sat on the board of directors of Maschinenfabrik Oerlikon, of which he was vice-president from 1938 to 1946 and president from 1946 to 1954.

He was chief of staff of the 3rd Division in 1915 and a member of a military mission to the German and French armies in 1917. In 1918 he was director of the Federal Food Office (Eidgenössisches Ernährungsamt), and in 1919 he became a colonel.

== Bibliography ==
- E. Studer-von Goumoëns, "Eduard von Goumoëns 1874–1959", in Schweizer Pioniere der Wirtschaft und Technik, 12, 1961, 57–88
- L'Etat-major général suisse, 8, 145–146
