= Albert von Morlot =

Swiss engineer (1846–1931)

- Lithograph from the Schweizerische Portrait-Gallerie, 1899
- Born: 16 February 1846; Bern, Switzerland
- Died: 21 January 1931 (aged 84); Bern, Switzerland
- Occupation: Engineer
- Spouse: Anna Margaritha von Wurstemberger

Albert von Morlot (16 February 1846 – 21 January 1931) was a Swiss engineer. From 1891 to 1918 he was the federal chief inspector of public works (Eidgenössischer Oberbauinspektor).

== Biography ==
Albert von Morlot was the son of Carl August Niklaus von Morlot and Louise Sophie née Kern. He married Anna Margaritha von Wurstemberger. He studied engineering in Zurich and Paris. His daughter Helene married Eduard von Goumoëns.

Until 1876 Morlot worked as an engineer in Bern and on the Jura water correction at Nidau. From 1876 to 1891 he was an engineer at the Federal Inspectorate of Public Works (Eidgenössisches Oberbauinspektorat), and from 1891 to 1918 he was federal chief inspector of public works. In this role he devoted himself above all to containing major floods and to measures against the devastating effects of torrents and ground movements. He was a lieutenant colonel in the engineer troops.

== Bibliography ==
- Der Bund, 23 January 1931
