= Jakob Schlesinger =

German painter (1792–1855)

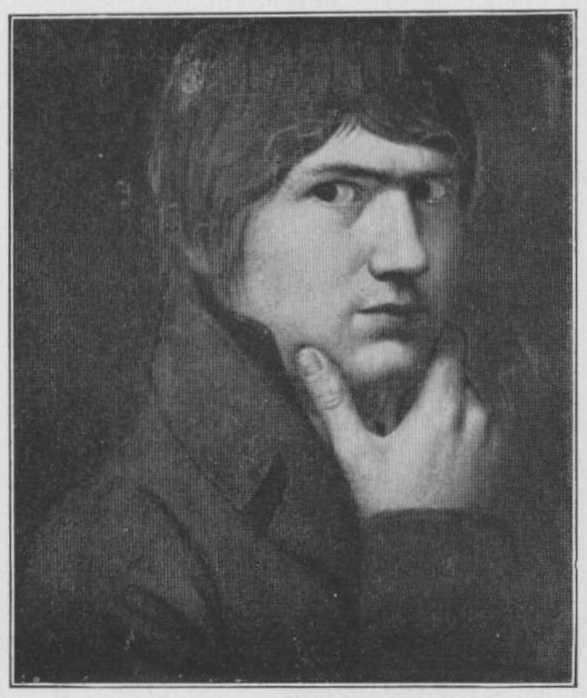
Self-portrait (1810)

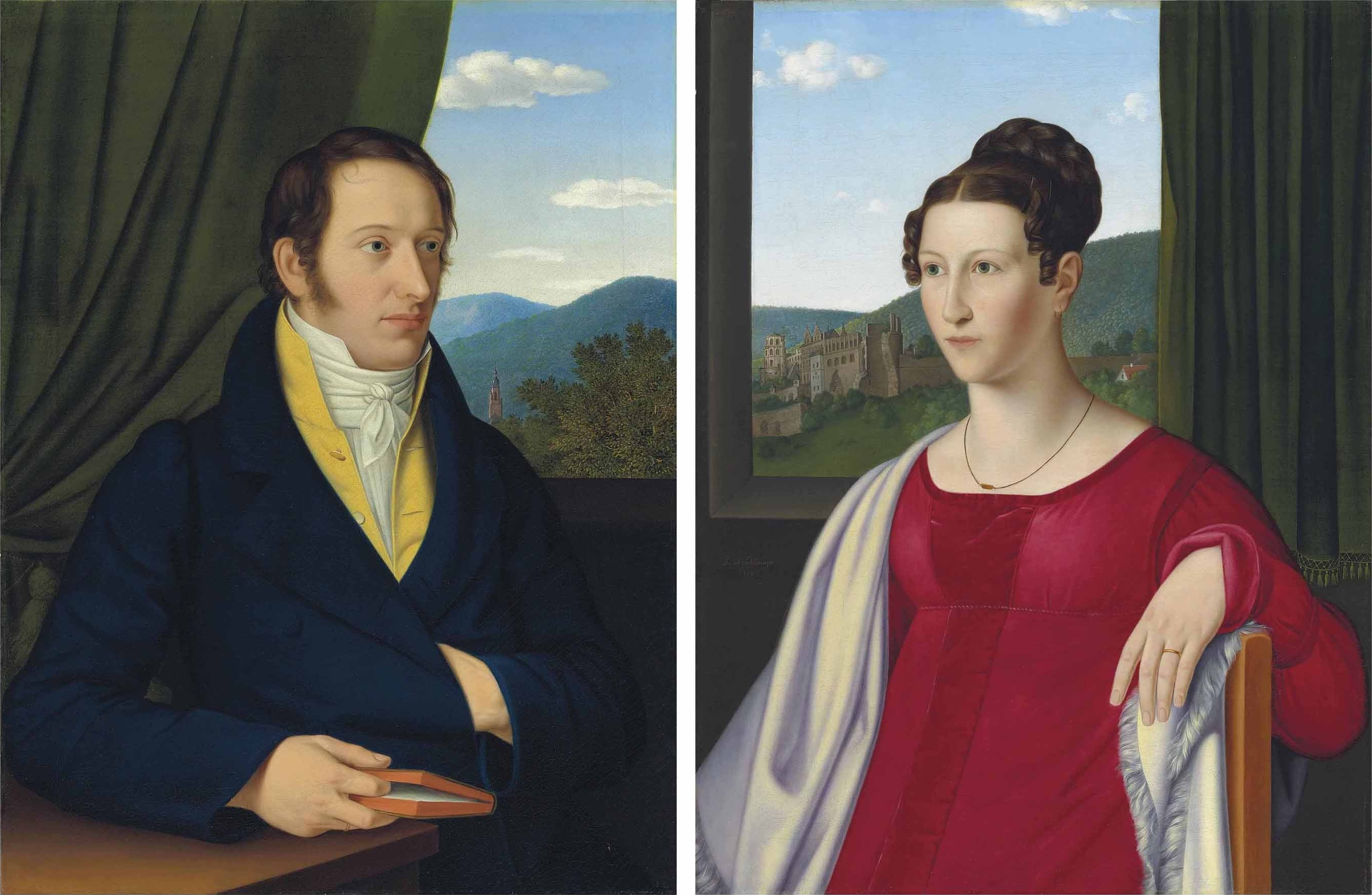
The Heidelberg Chemist Leopold Gmelin and his wife (1820)

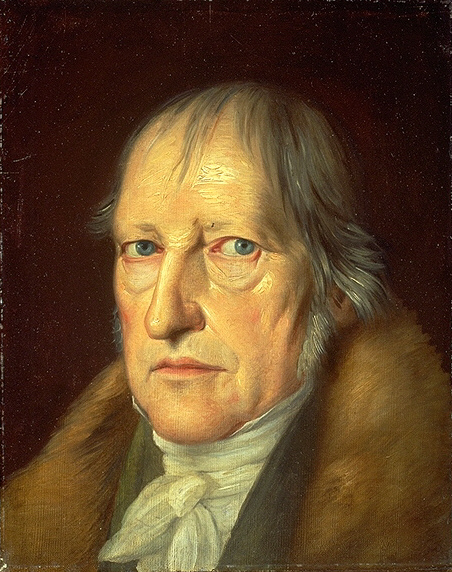
Georg Wilhelm Friedrich Hegel (1831)

Jakob Schlesinger, also Johann Jakob Schlesinger (13 January 1792 – 12 May 1855), was a German painter and restorer.

== Early years ==
Johann Jacob Schlesinger was born in Worms as the son of the painter Johann Adam Schlesinger (1759–1829) and his wife Catharina Barbara, née Becker. His father, also a renowned painter, came from Ebertsheim, the mother from Grünstadt. The couple lived for some time in Worms, the birthplace of their son. The family moved to Grünstadt soon after. There, the boy grew up and received his first artistic training possibly from his uncle (his father's brother), Johann Schlesinger (1768–1840), an already regionally known painter.

From 1809 to 1816 Johann Jacob Schlesinger attended the University of Heidelberg and then continued his education in Mannheim and Munich. In the Bavarian capital he started his studies from May 12, 1819, on "historical painting" at the Academy of Fine Arts, Munich. Because of an eye disease, however, he had to interrupt his studies for three years.

== Career ==
Schlesinger developed a special talent for the restoration of paintings and gained a considerable reputation in this field. In particular, he devoted himself to the old German school. At first, he was working mainly for the brothers Boisserée in Heidelberg. In 1822 he received an appointment as a professor and general restorer at the Royal Museum in Berlin.

Schlesinger was recognized as a great painter and excellent copyist, with a fondness for art from the 16th century. In 1821 he traveled to Dresden and reproduced Raphael's Sistine Madonna for the Speyer Cathedral. In 1834 he lithographed, for the Karlsruhe Art Club the heads of Saint Barbara and the Pope, separately. He is also known for landscape portraits and pictures of fruit and flowers, though in academic cool manner, but very thoroughly elaborated. In addition to painting, Schlesinger worked as a lithographer. He died in 1855 in Berlin.

As of the early 21st century, Schlesinger's most famous work is the portrait of Hegel in his last year of life (1831), which has been widely reproduced.

Annik Pietsch's book, Weder Haut noch Fleisch: Das Inkarnat in der Kunstgeschichte (Neither skin nor flesh: The flesh tones in the history of art) contains a detailed discussion on the Hegel portrait.
