= Eduard Mandel =

German engraver

Johann August Eduard Mandel
- Johan Vilhelm Gertner, Portrait of Eduard Mandel, 1848
- Born: 15 February 1810; Berlin, Kingdom of Prussia
- Died: 20 October 1882 (aged 72); Berlin, German Empire
- Known for: Engraving

Johann August Eduard Mandel (15 February 1810 – 20 October 1882) was a German engraver.

== Biography ==
He was born at Berlin in 1810, and early received encouragement from King Frederick William III. He entered the academy in 1826, and worked under Professor Buchhorn. In consequence of the success of his first work,' The Warrior and his Daughter,' after Hildebrand, in 1830, he was appointed by the academy to engrave the 'Loreley' after Regas. In the same year he obtained a third class medal at Paris, and in 1844 a second class. In 1855 he sent to the Paris Universal Exhibition, 'Christ weeping over Jerusalem,' after Ary Schefier, the 'Portrait of Frederick William TV. after Otto; 'Two Children,' after Magnus, and his famous 'Portrait of Charles I,' after Vandyke; and was rewarded with a medal of the first class. He was appointed professor of engraving in 1842. Mandel was born in Berlin. He studied from 1824 with the map engraver Johann Karl Mare, and from 1826 to 1830 in the studio of Ludwig Buchhorn. His first engraving was a portrait of Friedrich Wilhelm III after his own design (1830). He completed his first larger work in 1835, Der Krieger und sein Kind, after a painting by Theodor Hildebrandt; it was so well received that he was assigned by the Prussian Art Association to make an engraving after Lurlei by Carl Joseph Begas (completed 1839). In 1837, he was appointed a member of the Akademie der Künste. In 1840 he traveled to Paris, to study further with Louis Pierre Henriquel-Dupont and Auguste Gaspard Louis Desnoyers, among others. While there, he produced the engraving Italienischen Hirtenknaben after a painting by Pollack. After his return he produced a series of engravings considered among the finest in 19th-century German engraving. He was head of the engraving studio at the Akademie der Künste from 1856. His most important work, done shortly before his death, was an engraving after the Sistine Madonna of Raphael.

== Engravings ==
The Warrior and His Child, copper engraving after Theodor Hildebrandt

- Portrait of Friedrich Wilhelm III (1830)
- Der Krieger und sein Kind, after Theodor Hildebrandt (1835)
- Lurlei, after Carl Joseph Begas (1839)
- Italienischen Hirtenknaben, after Pollack (1840)
- Self-portrait, after Anthony van Dyck (1841)
- Self-portrait, after Titian (1843)
- Portraits of Friedrich Wilhelm IV and Elisabeth Ludovika of Bavaria
- Portrait of Charles I of England (1850)
- Several portraits of Frederick the Great
- Madonna Colonna, after Raphael (1855)
- Ecce homo, after Guido Reni (1858)
- Portrait of a Young Man, after Raphael (1860)
- Madonna della Seggiola, after Raphael (1865)
- La Bella, after Titian (1868)
- Panshanger Madonna, after Raphael (1872)
- Maria und Johannes, after Bernhard Plockhorst
- Die Ehebrecherin, after Bernhard Plockhorst
- Sistine Madonna, after Raphael
Madonna della Seggiola, copper engraving after Raphael

Ecce Homo, copper engraving by Guido Reni

Self-portrait, copper engraving after Anthony van Dyck

Mater Dolorosa, copper engraving after Carlo Dolci

Gretchen’s Churchgoing, copper engraving after Wilhelm von Kaulbach

Portrait of Elisabeth Ludovika of Bavaria, copper engraving after Joseph Karl Stieler

Young Shepherd with a Jug, copper engraving after Leopold Pollak

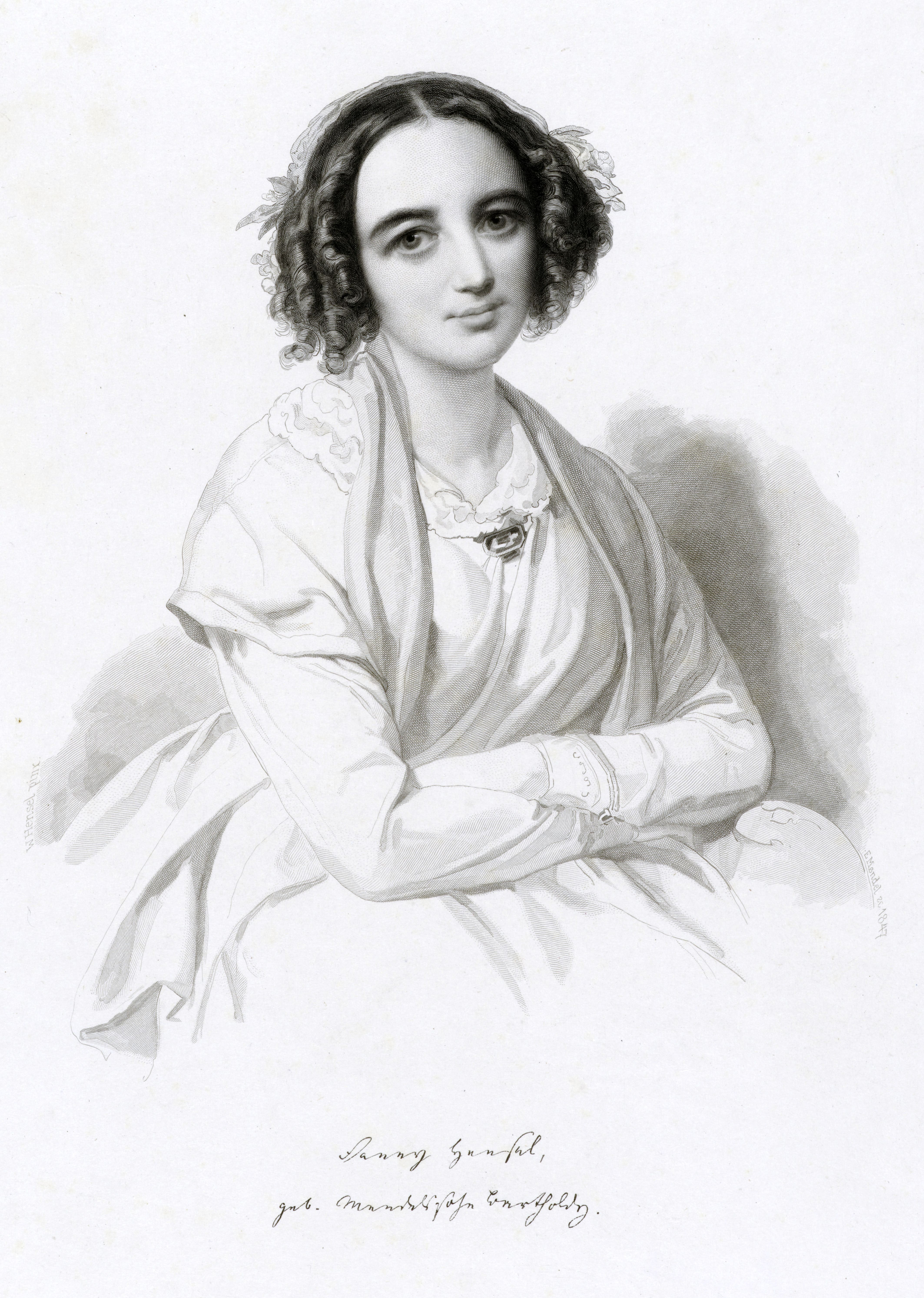
Portrait of Fanny Hensel, copper engraving after Wilhelm Hensel

== Bibliography ==
- "Mandel". Meyers Konversations-Lexikon (in German). Vol. 11 (4th ed.). 1890. p. 180.

== Note ==
- This article, or an earlier version, was translated from an article in the 4th edition of the Meyers Konversations-Lexikon, a publication now in the public domain.
