= Allmendingen bei Bern =

- Municipality
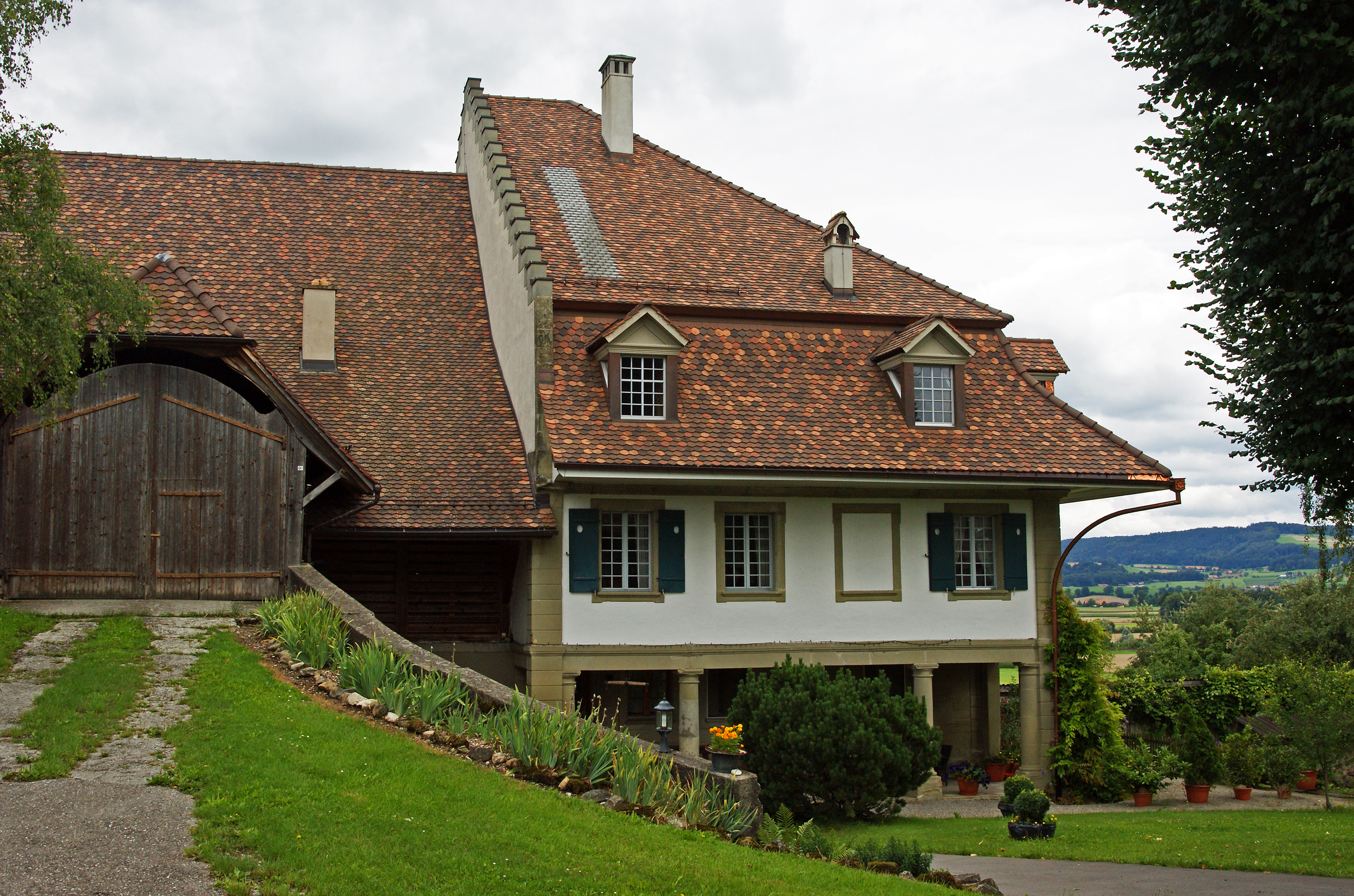
- The Noble's Manor House in Allmendingen

- Flag Coat of arms
- Location of Allmendingen bei Bern
- Location within Switzerland Location within Canton of Bern
- Coordinates: 46°55′N 7°31′E
- Country: Switzerland
- Canton: Bern
- District: Bern-Mittelland

Government
  - Executive: Gemeinderat with 5 members
  - Mayor: Gemeindepräsident; Alfred Jost (as of 2026)

Area
  - Total: 3.8 km^{2} (1.5 sq mi)
- Elevation: 589 m (1,932 ft)

Population (December 2020)
  - Total: 579
  - Density: 150/km^{2} (390/sq mi)
- Time zone: UTC+01:00 (CET)
  - Summer (DST): UTC+02:00 (CEST)
- Postal code: 3112
- SFOS number: 630
- ISO 3166 code: CH-BE
- Surrounded by: Belp, Muri bei Bern, Rubigen, Worb
- Website: www.allmendingen.ch

Allmendingen bei Bern is a municipality in the Bern-Mittelland administrative district in the canton of Bern in Switzerland. Besides the village of Allmendingen, the municipality includes the settlement of Märchligen.

== History ==
Allmendingen is first mentioned in 1256 as Alwandigen under the control of Rudolf von Alwandingen.

Until the end of 1992, Allmendingen was a part of Rubigen, which it separated from on 1 January 1993 to become a separate municipality.

Some traces of a prehistoric settlement and High Medieval fortifications were discovered in the Hüenliwald. The fortifications were abandoned by 1256, when the village was first mentioned. During the High Medieval period, Allmendingen Castle was built in the village. The castle was later abandoned and fell into ruin. The ruins were still visible in the village in 1729, but have since vanished.

In 1256 the Lords of Allmendingen sold both Allmendingen and the village of Märchligen to Interlaken Monastery. In 1528, the city of Bern adopted the new faith of the Protestant Reformation and began imposing it on the Bernese Oberland. The monastery and its villages rose up in an unsuccessful rebellion against the new faith. After Bern imposed its will on the monastery, they secularized it and annexed all its lands, including Allmendingen.

Starting in the 17th century, Bernese patricians, trying to escape the city, built country manor houses in Allmendingen. These included the 1607 Neue Schloss for Kaspar von Graffenried and the 1723 Märchligen Estate for Samuel Morlot, both of which were used as summer residences. Other nobles built country estates and became gentleman farmers, including the Alter Sandacker estate (which was built before 1794) and the Hübeli estate from 1846.

During the early 20th century agriculture remained the major source of income in the village, while Bern grew around the village. In 1972 a number of zoning restrictions were lifted which finally allowed new construction. The municipality is located outside Bern but has easy access to the city along the old Bern-Thun highway, the Bern-Thun railway line from 1859, the Bern-Langnau-Lucerne railway from 1864 to 1875 and the A6 motorway which was built in 1973.

== Geography ==
Allmendingen has an area of 3.81 km^{2} (1.47 sq mi). Of this area, 2.47 km^{2} (0.95 mi^{2}) or 65.0% is used for agricultural purposes, while 0.81 km^{2} (0.31 mi^{2}) or 21.3% is forested. Of the rest of the land, 0.37 km^{2} (0.14 mi^{2}) or 9.7% is settled (buildings or roads), 0.06 km^{2} (15 acres) or 1.6% is either rivers or lakes and 0.07 km^{2} (17 acres) or 1.8% is unproductive land.

Of the built up area, housing and buildings made up 4.7% and transportation infrastructure made up 3.9%. Out of the forested land, all of the forested land area is covered with heavy forests. Of the agricultural land, 47.4% is used for growing crops and 14.7% is pastures, while 2.9% is used for orchards or vine crops. All the water in the municipality is flowing water.

It consists of the village of Allmendingen and the hamlet of Märchligen.

On 31 December 2009 Amtsbezirk Konolfingen, the municipality's former district, was dissolved. On the following day, 1 January 2010, it joined the newly created Verwaltungskreis Bern-Mittelland.

== Coat of arms ==
The blazon of the municipal coat of arms is Per Chevron embowed Sable and Argent.

== Demographics ==
Allmendingen has a population (as of December 2020) of 579. As of 2010, 6.8% of the population are resident foreign nationals. Over the last 10 years (2000–2010) the population has changed at a rate of -0.6%. Migration accounted for 0.4%, while births and deaths accounted for 2.3%.

Most of the population (as of 2000) speaks German (471 or 95.2%) as their first language, French is the second most common (7 or 1.4%) and English is the third (7 or 1.4%). There are 4 people who speak Italian.

As of 2008, the population was 52.0% male and 48.0% female. The population was made up of 249 Swiss men (48.3% of the population) and 19 (3.7%) non-Swiss men. There were 231 Swiss women (44.9%) and 16 (3.1%) non-Swiss women. Of the population in the municipality, 115 or about 23.2% were born in Allmendingen and lived there in 2000. There were 253 or 51.1% who were born in the same canton, while 70 or 14.1% were born somewhere else in Switzerland, and 39 or 7.9% were born outside of Switzerland.

As of 2010, children and teenagers (0–19 years old) make up 19% of the population, while adults (20–64 years old) make up 60.2% and seniors (over 64 years old) make up 20.8%.

As of 2000, there were 209 people who were single and never married in the municipality. There were 258 married individuals, 17 widows or widowers and 11 individuals who are divorced.

As of 2000, there were 46 households that consist of only one person and 11 households with five or more people. In 2000, a total of 198 apartments (90.8% of the total) were permanently occupied, while 18 apartments (8.3%) were seasonally occupied and 2 apartments (0.9%) were empty. The vacancy rate for the municipality, in 2011, was 0.44%.

The historical population is given in the following chart:

== Heritage sites of national significance ==
The Noble's Manor House, the Alter Sandacker and the Villa at Bergliweg 11 are listed as Swiss heritage site of national significance.

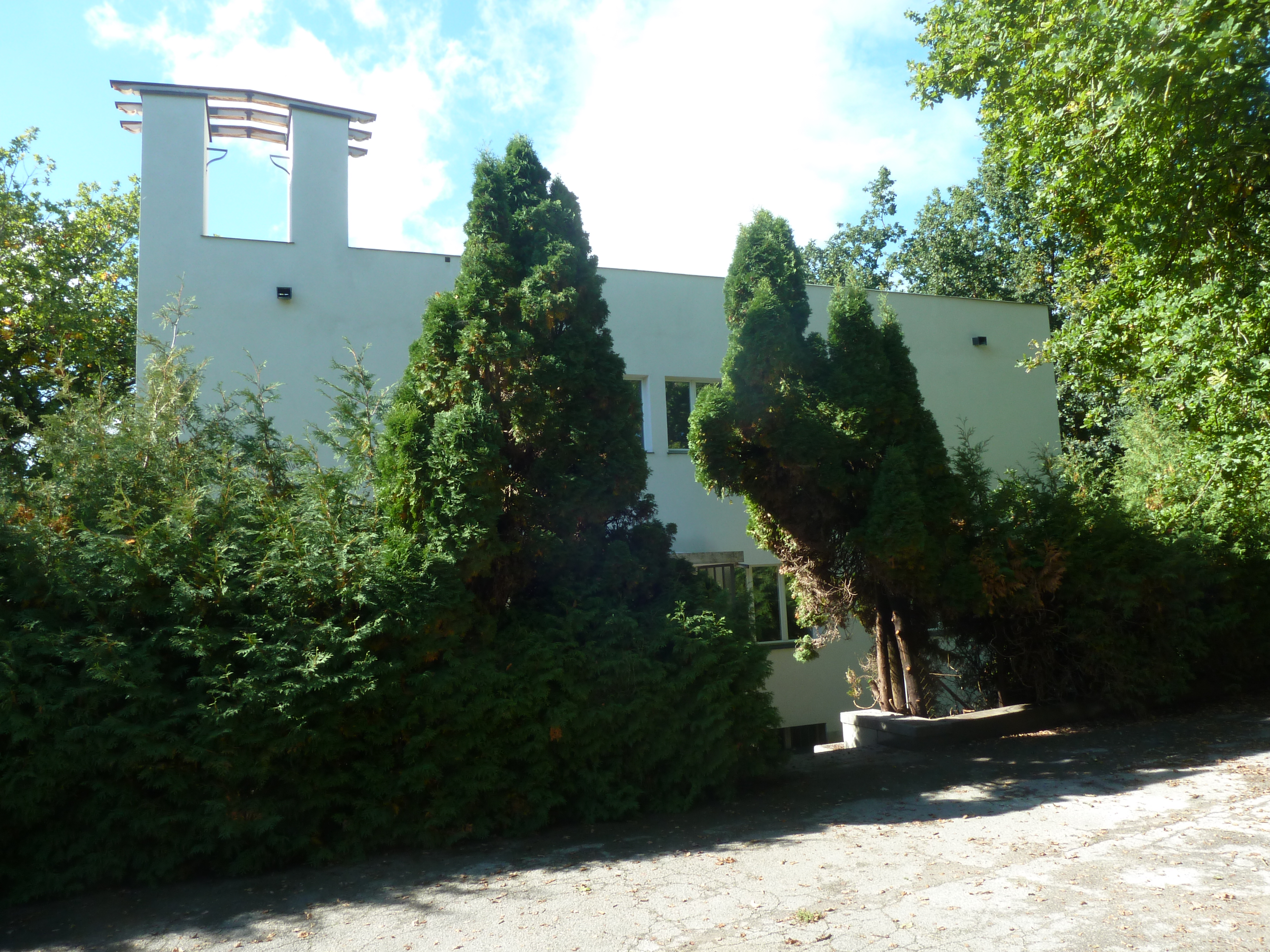
Allmendingen Villa

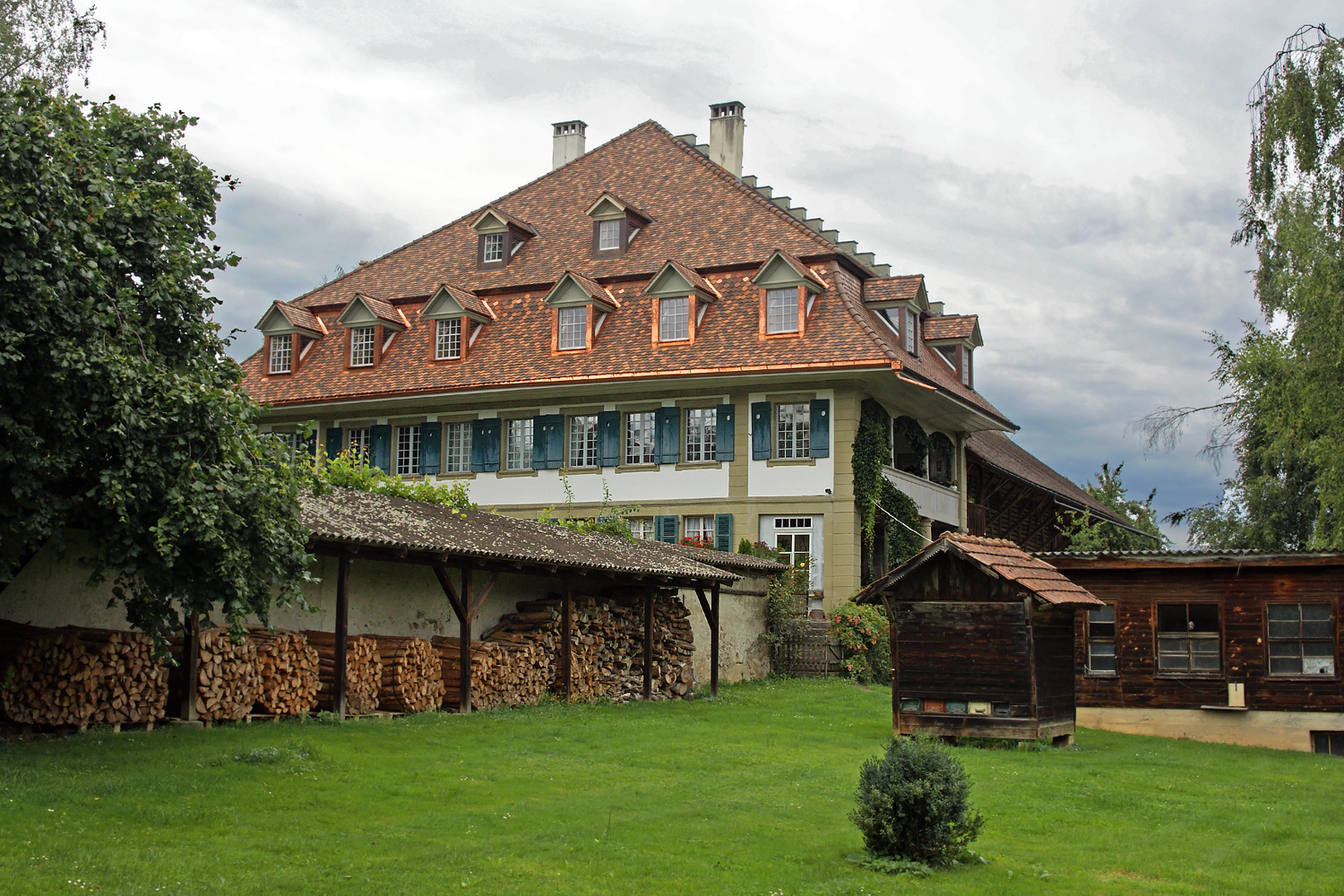
The Noble's Manor House

== Politics ==
In the 2011 federal election the most popular party was the SVP which received 31.8% of the vote. The next three most popular parties were the BDP Party (21.7%), the SPS (13.9%) and the FDP (12.3%). In the federal election, a total of 256 votes were cast, and the voter turnout was 63.5%.

== Economy ==
As of 2011, Allmendingen had an unemployment rate of 1.49%. As of 2008, there were a total of 215 people employed in the municipality. Of these, there were 47 people employed in the primary economic sector and about 14 businesses involved in this sector. 18 people were employed in the secondary sector and there were 3 businesses in this sector. 150 people were employed in the tertiary sector, with 14 businesses in this sector.

In 2008 there were a total of 171 full-time equivalent jobs. The number of jobs in the primary sector was 34, all of which were in agriculture. The number of jobs in the secondary sector was 16 of which 2 or (12.5%) were in manufacturing and 14 (87.5%) were in construction. The number of jobs in the tertiary sector was 121. In the tertiary sector; 76 or 62.8% were in wholesale or retail sales or the repair of motor vehicles, 9 or 7.4% were in the movement and storage of goods, 13 or 10.7% were in a hotel or restaurant, 2 or 1.7% were technical professionals or scientists, 4 or 3.3% were in education.

In 2000, there were 99 workers who commuted into the municipality and 223 workers who commuted away. The municipality is a net exporter of workers, with about 2.3 workers leaving the municipality for every one entering. Of the working population, 23.6% used public transportation to get to work, and 46.6% used a private car.

== Religion ==
From the 2000 census, 51 or 10.3% were Roman Catholic, while 371 or 74.9% belonged to the Swiss Reformed Church. Of the rest of the population, there were 3 members of an Orthodox church (or about 0.61% of the population), and there were 31 individuals (or about 6.26% of the population) who belonged to another Christian church. There were 6 (or about 1.21% of the population) who were Islamic. 32 (or about 6.46% of the population) belonged to no church, are agnostic or atheist, and 16 individuals (or about 3.23% of the population) did not answer the question.

== Education ==
In Allmendingen about 230 or (46.5%) of the population have completed non-mandatory upper secondary education, and 108 or (21.8%) have completed additional higher education (either university or a Fachhochschule). Of the 108 who completed tertiary schooling, 66.7% were Swiss men, 25.9% were Swiss women, 4.6% were non-Swiss men.

The Canton of Bern school system provides one year of non-obligatory Kindergarten, followed by six years of Primary school. This is followed by three years of obligatory lower Secondary school where the students are separated according to ability and aptitude. Following the lower Secondary students may attend additional schooling or they may enter an apprenticeship.

During the 2009–10 school year, there were a total of 35 students attending classes in Allmendingen. There was one kindergarten class with a total of 9 students in the municipality. Of the kindergarten students, 11.1% were permanent or temporary residents of Switzerland (not citizens) and 22.2% have a different mother language than the classroom language. The municipality had 2 primary classes and 26 students. Of the primary students, 3.8% were permanent or temporary residents of Switzerland (not citizens) and 3.8% have a different mother language than the classroom language.

As of 2000, there were 8 students in Allmendingen who came from another municipality, while 41 residents attended schools outside the municipality.
