= Iris von Roten =

Swiss feminist writer, journalist and lawyer

Iris von Roten-Meyer (2 April 1917 – 11 September 1990) was a Swiss journalist, writer, feminist, jurist and a lawyer.

== Biography ==
Iris von Roten was born in Basel, Switzerland. She was the editor of the women's paper Schweizer Frauenblatt in 1943–1945. She was a feminist, inspired by Simone de Beauvoir. She is most known for her feminist work Frauen im Laufgitter: the book received such negative criticism and hostility that she was blamed for the fact that the proposal for women's suffrage was voted down in 1959.

On 6 December 1955, during the "Panthermantel Affair", von Roten was stopped by Police officers at 2 am while on the way to her analyst. The police officers did not believe that she was a lawyer and took her to the police station where she was interrogated for refusing to comply with their questions. She later claimed that she had been arrested because she had been wearing trousers and thus the police had mistaken her for a prostitute. Feeling discriminated against, von Roten went to the news to open a dialogue about women's right. This incident in part inspired her to write her controversial book "Frauen im Laufgitter"

Her book "Frauen im Laufgitter" evoked a negative reaction from men and women alike. Men saw her as man-hating and mocked her; the women of Switzerland saw her as a radical, and blamed her for the losing vote on women's suffrage. They believed in gradual change and saw her as far too extreme. von Rotens daughter Hortenia has been quoted explaining the rejection, saying: "Women do not like to recognize and do not gladly admit what a lousy situation they are."

After the negative reception of her book, she left for Turkey to fulfill a childhood dream and not, as many believed, to run from the backlash. Once in Turkey, she thoroughly enjoyed herself and did as she pleased, being able to ignore traditional Gender roles.

After her short stay in Turkey, von Roten returned to Switzerland and wrote a memoir of her travels. It was rejected by publishers. Following her rejection, she chose to continue traveling.

Iris von Roten committed suicide on 11 September 1990 at the age of 73. She was quoted saying, "Just as a guest has to know when it's time to depart, a person should rise from the table of life while there's still time."
