= Gottlieb Emanuel von Morlot =

Swiss beekeeper (1788–1844)

- Baptised: 27 December 1788; Bern, Switzerland
- Died: 29 February 1844; Bern, Switzerland
- Occupations: Civil servant; beekeeper
- Notable work: Die Bienenzucht, theoretisch und praktisch (1839)

Gottlieb Emanuel von Morlot (baptized 27 December 1788 – 29 February 1844) was a Bernese civil servant and beekeeper. After he went blind, he founded the first Bernese institution for the blind (Blindenanstalt) in Bern in 1837.

== Biography ==
Gottlieb Emanuel von Morlot was a member of the Morlot family. He was the son of Karl Emanuel, a member of the Grand Council and state secretary (Staatsschreiber), and Katharina von Sinner. He did not marry.

Morlot first worked in the Bernese state service as chancellery archivist (Kanzleiarchivar) and forestry secretary (Forstsekretär). After he went blind, he founded the first Bernese institution for the blind (Blindenanstalt) in Bern in 1837 and became president of its board (Direktionspräsident). He was also an internationally respected beekeeper and wrote on the subject: in 1839 he published Die Bienenzucht, theoretisch und praktisch.

== Bibliography ==
- Sammlung bernischer Biographien, 1, 1884, 125–140
