= Gmelin's test =

Chemical test

Gmelin's test is a chemical test used for detecting the presence of bile pigments in urine. It is named after Leopold Gmelin, who introduced the test. Five millilitres of urine is slowly added to five millilitres of concentrated nitric acid in a test-tube. Different coloured rings between the two layers are visible if bile pigments are present as they are oxidised to various chemical products. Nitric acid is used as the oxidising agent. Blue, green and violet rings are seen if bilirubin is present. Gmelin's test is not sensitive, so a positive result always indicates the presence of bile pigments, but a negative result does not exclude the presence of small quantities of bile pigments.
