= Morlot family =

Patrician family of Bern, Switzerland

The Morlot family (also von Morlot) is a family of the city of Bern, originally from Lorraine, that was eligible to hold government office (regimentsfähig). Its progenitor Marc, a physician, was admitted to the citizenship of Bern in 1600. The family later divided into two lines: the elder, which still exists, produced several pastors and turned to banking in the 19th century, while the younger, now extinct, stayed in state service and was mainly in Dutch mercenary service, and later produced engineers and natural scientists. The family has borne the particle von since 1838.

== History ==
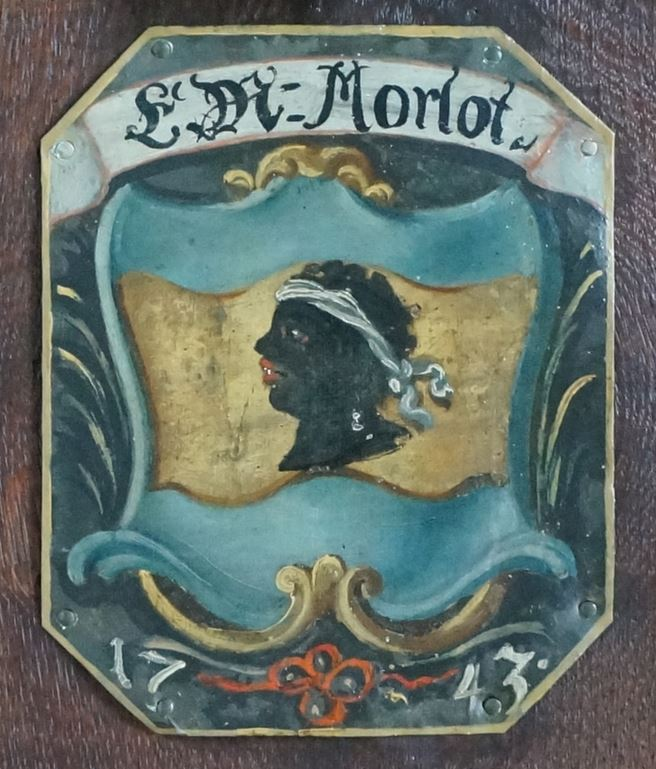
Morlot coat of arms, 1743

The family came from Lorraine. Its progenitor Marc (born 1562) came from Basel: he was called to Bern as city physician (Stadtarzt) and was admitted to the citizenship of Bern (Burgerrecht) in 1600. His sons Theodor (1593–1661) and Daniel became members of the Small Council.

With Daniel's sons the family divided into two lines. The elder line, that of Johann (1630–1709), produced several pastors, while the members of the younger line, that of David (1640–1692), stayed in state service and were mainly in Dutch mercenary service, among them Franz Ludwig and Samuel. As holders of the lordship of Münchenwiler in the first half of the 17th century, and through their marriages with other ruling families, the Morlots belonged to the third class of the vesten Familien, according to a booklet of forms of address (Titulaturenbüchlein) of about 1651.

From the 19th century the elder line, which still exists, turned to banking, while the younger line, now extinct, produced engineers and natural scientists such as Gottlieb Emanuel, Adolf, and Albert. The family has borne the particle von since 1838.

== Bibliography ==
- Schweizerisches Geschlechterbuch, 2, 371–376; 6, 433–435
- B. von Rodt, Genealogien burgerlicher Geschlechter der Stadt Bern, 4, 89–101 (manuscript, 1950, Burgerbibliothek Bern)
