= Leopold Gmelin =

German chemist (1788–1853)

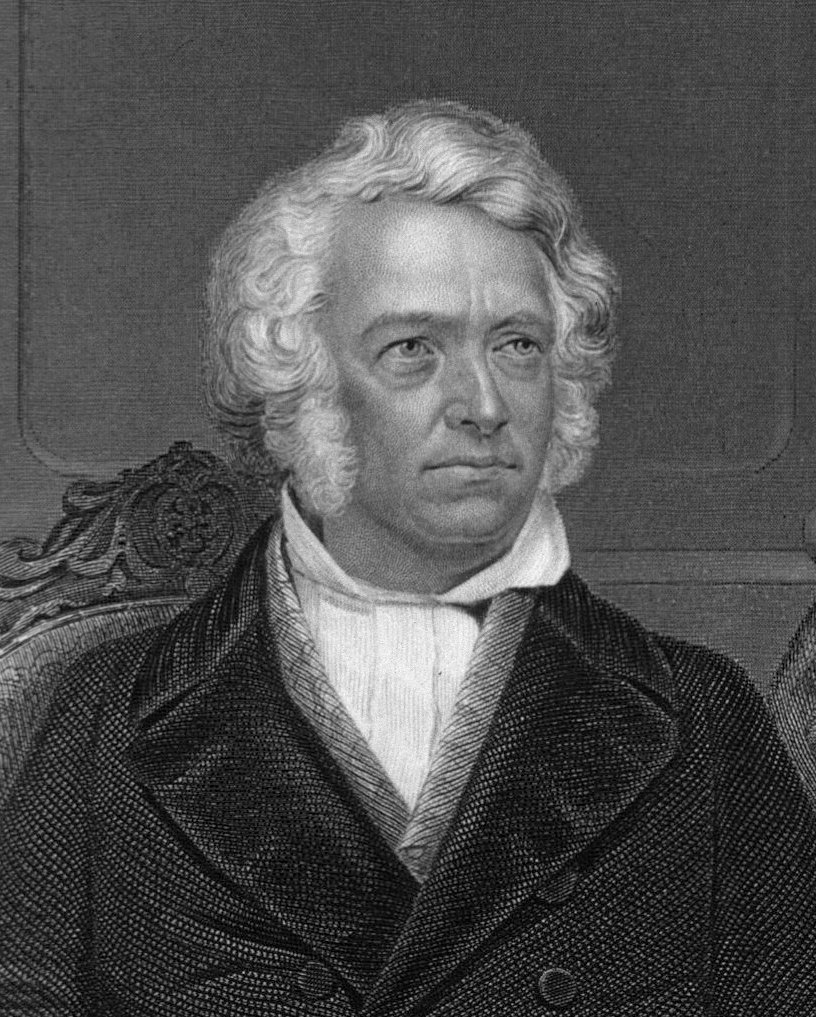
- Born: 2 August 1788; Göttingen, Electorate of Hanover, Holy Roman Empire
- Died: 13 April 1853 (aged 64); Heidelberg, Grand Duchy of Baden, German Confederation
- Known for: Gmelin's test Croconic acid Potassium ferricyanide
- Scientific career
- Fields: Chemistry
- Workplaces: University of Heidelberg

Leopold Gmelin (2 August 1788 – 13 April 1853) was a German chemist. Gmelin was a professor at the University of Heidelberg. He worked on the red prussiate and created Gmelin's test, and wrote his Handbook of Chemistry, which over successive editions became a standard reference work still in use.

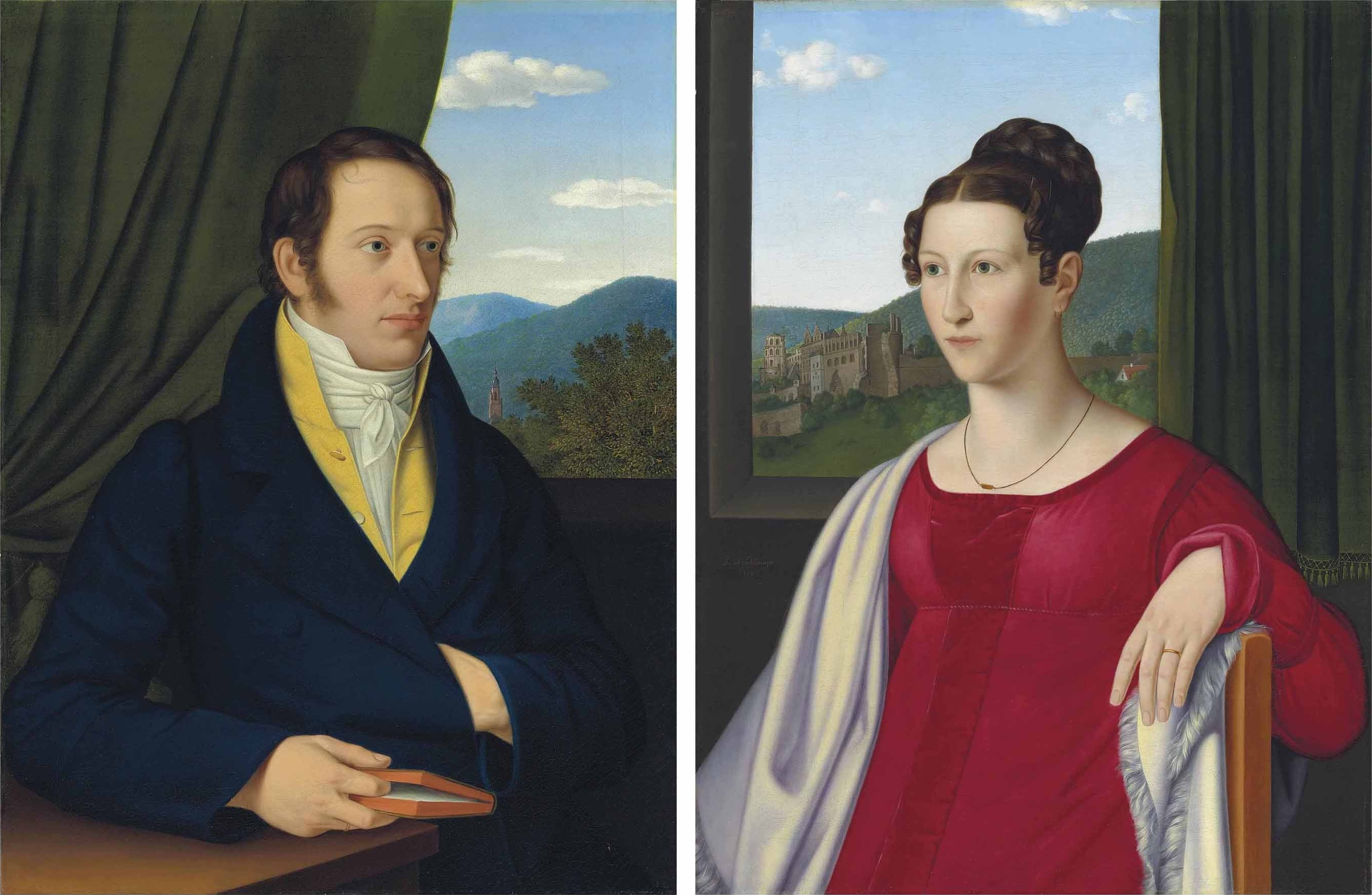
Gmelin and his wife, portraits by Jakob Schlesinger, 1820

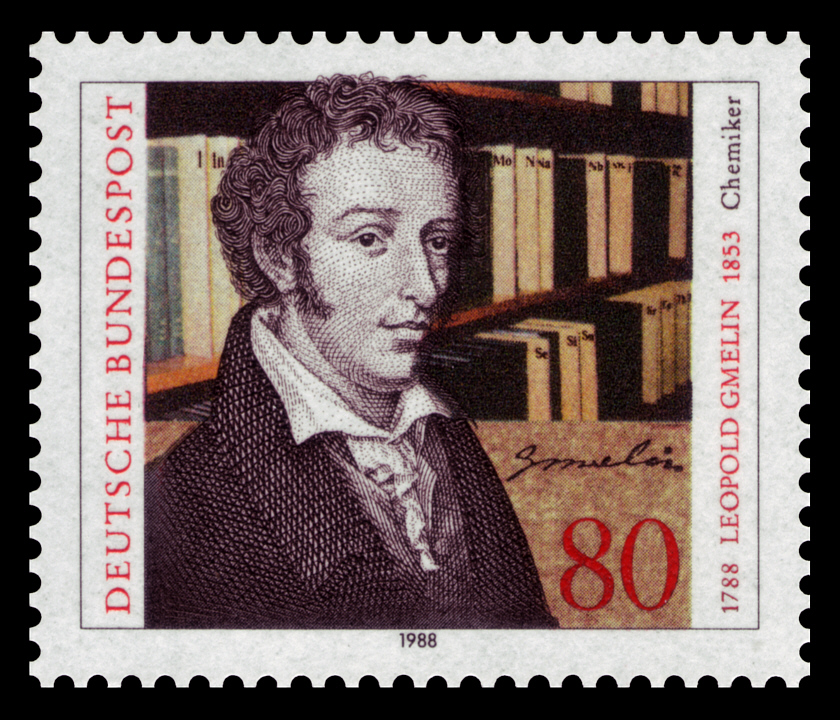
German postal stamp featuring Gmelin

== Life ==
Gmelin was a son of the physician, botanist and chemist Johann Friedrich Gmelin and his wife Rosine Schott. Due to his family he early came in contact with medicine and the natural sciences, in 1804 he attended the chemical lectures of his father. In the same year Gmelin moved to Tübingen to work in the family pharmacy, he also studied at the University of Tübingen among other relatives including Ferdinand Gottlieb Gmelin (a cousin) and Carl Friedrich Kielmeyer (husband of a cousin). Supported by Kielmeyer, Gmelin moved to the University of Göttingen in 1805 and later he worked as assistant in the laboratory of Friedrich Stromeyer, by whom he successfully passed his exams in 1809.

Leopold Gmelin returned to Tübingen and again heard the lectures of Ferdinand Gottlieb Gmelin and Carl Friedrich Kielmeyer. In February 1811, Gmelin clashed with the medical student Gutike, according to an insult he challenged him to a duel, without serious injuries. Because duels were forbidden among students the incident was kept a secret at first, he nevertheless came to light. On March 10, Gmelin fled and went to Joseph Franz von Jacquin at the University of Vienna. Focus of his research was the Black pigment of oxen and calves eyes, outcome of this work was also the subject of Gmelins dissertation. In 1812, he received his doctorate in Göttingen in absentia. Until 1813, Gmelin went on an extensive study trip through Italy. After his return, he began to work as a Privatdozent at the Heidelberg University since the winter semester of 1813/14, at first he worked on his Habilitation in Göttingen. On 26 September of the following year, he was appointed associate professor in Heidelberg.

In the fall of 1814, he went on another educational trip to Paris to study at the Sorbonne, he remained there until the spring of 1815. Together with his cousin, Christian Gottlob Gmelin he made the acquaintance of René Just Haüy, Joseph Louis Gay-Lussac, Louis Jacques Thénard and Louis Nicolas Vauquelin.

In 1816, Gmelin married Louise in Heidelberg-Kirchheim, a daughter of the Kirchheimer pastor Johann Conrad Maurer, the lawyer Georg Ludwig von Maurer became his brother-in-law. Together they had three daughters and one son, including Auguste, the future wife of the physician Theodor von Dusch.

When the chemist Martin Heinrich Klaproth died in Berlin in 1817, Gmelin should have succeeded him. However, he refused and became full Professor of Chemistry at the Heidelberg University. There, a close cooperation with Friedrich Tiedemann evolved with time. The two published "The digestion after tests" in 1826 and established the basis of the physiological chemistry. In the field of digestive chemistry Gmelin later discovered more components of bile and introduced Gmelin's test. When Friedrich Wöhler worked on complex cyanogen compounds in 1822, Gmelin assisted him and discovered the Red prussiate.

From 1833 to 1838, Gmelin owned a paper mill in the north of Heidelberg situated Schriesheim, he had taken it over in the hope of profit. However, the work in the mill showed to be very time- and money-consuming and at the expense of his academic activity.

In 1817, the first volume of Gmelin's Handbook of Chemistry was published. By 1843, it had grown in the fourth edition to 9 volumes. In this edition Gmelin included atomic theory and devoted much more space to the increasingly important organic chemistry. The Handbuch was published in print until the 8th edition in 1990, with an online database, which is less complete and less up-to-date than the print edition. The terms ester and ketone (from German Aketon, meaning acetone) were introduced by Gmelin. Until his death Gmelin worked on the fifth edition of the handbook, which had become a valuable source of chemical information and documentation. He also established the basis of an unambiguous classification of inorganic substances, later named the Gmelin system.

At the age of 60, Gmelin suffered a first stroke, and another in August 1850. In both strokes the right half of his body was affected; he was able to recover from the paralysis, but remained debilitated. In the spring of 1851, Gmelin applied for retirement, which was granted a few months later. In the two following years, he suffered increasingly from the effects of a brain illness, at nearly 65 years Leopold Gmelin died in Heidelberg on 13 April 1853, and was buried at the Mountain Cemetery in Heidelberg. The grave complex is located in the department E. There also rests his wife Luise Gmelin and more family members.

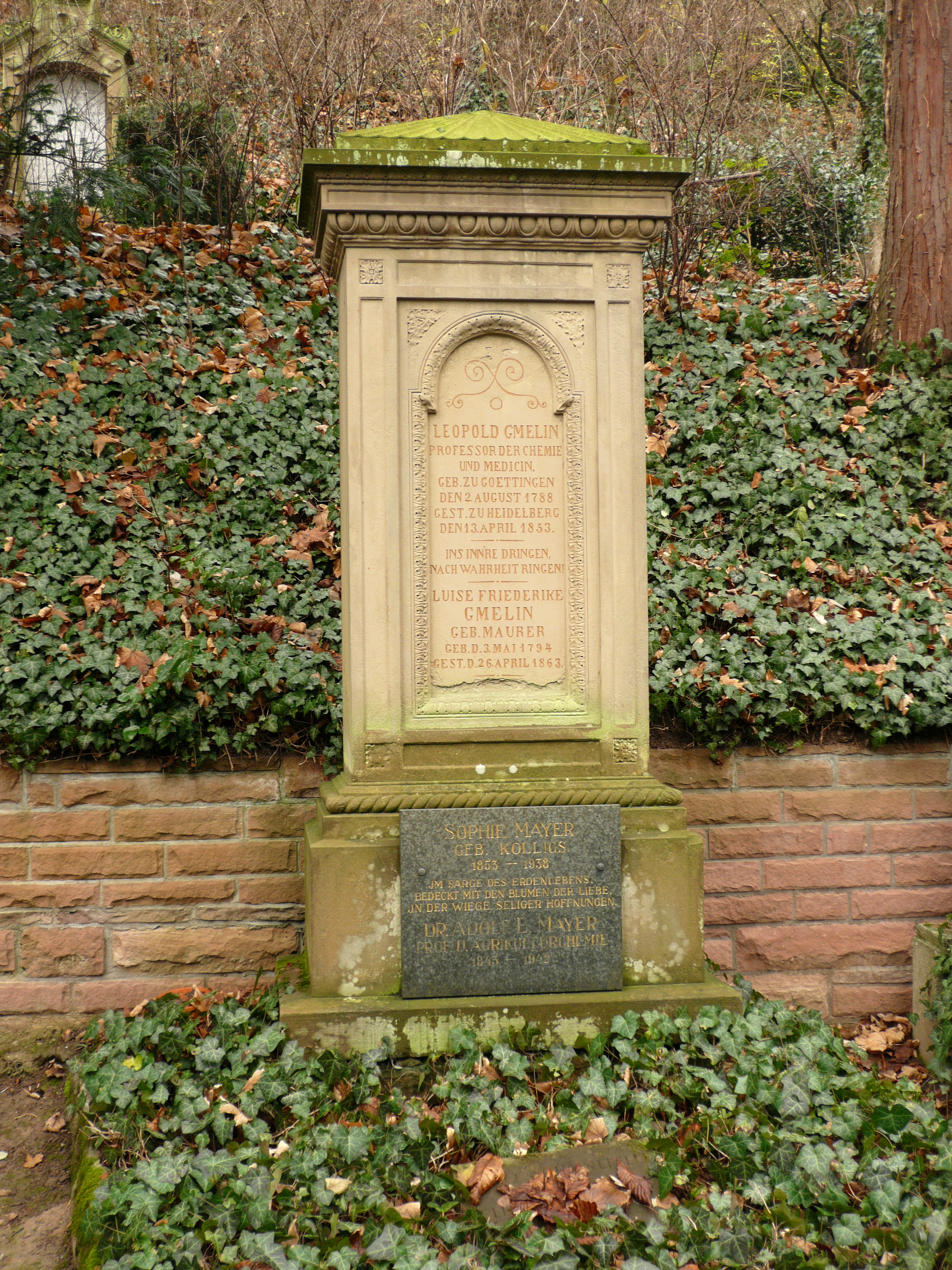
Leopold Gmelin's grave on the Mountain Cemetery in Heidelberg in the Dept. E

== Work ==
In his works Leopold Gmelin dealt with physiology, mineralogy and chemistry. His experimental work was marked by his very thorough and comprehensive way of working; also some writing talent is attributed to him.

Gmelin's first physiological work was his dissertation on the black pigment of oxen's and calves' eyes, whose coloring principle he tried to fathom. Despite the simplest chemical means he could describe the properties of the pigment and recognized the carbon rightly as the cause of staining. Gmelin's most important physiological work was the 1826 released digestion by experiments, which he made together with Friedrich Tiedemann. The work, which also described many new working techniques, contained groundbreaking insights into the gastric juice, in which they found hydrochloric acid, and bile, in which Gmelin and Tiedemann among others discovered cholesterol and taurine. Introduced by Gmelin, Gmelin's test enabled the detection of bile constituents in the urine of people suffering from jaundice. Furthermore, Gmelin and Tiedemann delivered a new, more refined view of the absorption of nutrients through the gastrointestinal tract; they were the founders of modern physiology.

The mineralogical works of Gmelin dealt with the analyses of various minerals, such as the hauyne, a silicate mineral, with which he made his habilitation in Göttingen, or the laumontite and the cordierite. In addition, Gmelin also analysed mineral waters and in 1825 published the work try of a new chemical mineral system, since he knew that the time's usual division on outer or physical characteristics was inadequate. Leopold Gmelin's mineral system was taken largely critical among experts, but the basic idea of an order based on the chemical composition proved to be useful.

Gmelin released the Handbook of theoretical chemistry, which was continued as the Gmelin Handbook of Inorganic Chemistry until 1997 in about 800 volumes by the Gmelin Institute, and it is continued by the Gesellschaft Deutscher Chemiker as a database. The manual, even during his lifetime his most important work, was initially intended to be a textbook, which should unite the whole chemical knowledge at that time. Due to the enormous increase in knowledge and the associated development of the handbook into a reference book, Gmelin published a compact textbook of chemistry in 1844. His chemical achievements include the discovery of the croconic acid; he thus had synthesised the first cyclic organic compound, and he made the previously mentioned discovery of the red prussiate.

In 1843, building on work done by Johann Wolfgang Döbereiner, Gmelin developed a forerunner of the periodic table, listing 55 chemical elements grouped by common characteristics. He also developed improved chemical equipment.

== Selected publications ==
- Chemische Untersuchung des schwarzen Pigments der Ochsen- und Kälberaugen, nebst einigen physiologischen Bemerkungen über dasselbe, Dissertation, Göttingen 1812, in Latein. Schweiggers Journ. 10, S. 507–547, 1814
- Oryktognostische und chemische Beobachtungen über den Haüyn und einige mit ihm vorkommende Fossilien, nebst geognostischen Bemerkungen über die Berge des alten Latiums, Schweiggers Journ. 15 S. 1-41, 1815; Ann. Phil. Thomson 4, S. 115-122; 193-199, 1814
- Leopold Gmelin, Friedrich Wöhler: Neue Cyanverbindungen, Schweiggers Journ. 36 S. 230–235, 1822
- Versuch eines neuen chemischen Mineralsystems, Taschenbuch gesammte Mineralog. 19, I S. 322-334; 418-474; 490-507, 1825, II S. 33-77; 97-148, 1825
- Friedrich Tiedemann, Leopold Gmelin: Die Verdauung nach Versuchen, Heidelberg und Leipzig 1826, 2 Bde.
- Lehrbuch der Chemie zum Gebrauche bei Vorlesungen auf Universitäten, in Militärschulen, polytechnischen Anstalten, Realschulen etc. sowie zum Selbstunterrichte, Heidelberg, Universitätsbuchhandlung Karl Winter, 1844

== Literature ==
- Claude K. Deischer: Gmelin, Leopold. In: Complete Dictionary of Scientific Biography. Band 5, Charles Scribner’s Sons, Detroit 2008, S. 429–432 (online).
- August Hirsch (1879). "Gmelin, Leopold" . Allgemeine Deutsche Biographie (in German). Vol. 9. Leipzig: Duncker & Humblot. pp. 272–273.
- Erich Pietsch (1964). "Gmelin, Leopold". Neue Deutsche Biographie (in German). Vol. 6. Berlin: Duncker & Humblot. pp. 480–481. (full text online).
- Friedrich Rosmäsler: Gallerie der vorzüglichsten Ärzte und Naturforscher Deutschlands. Perthes, Gotha 1831 (2 Bde.; darin Dauderts Gemälde).
- Bernd Wöbke (1988). "Das Portrait: Leopold Gmelin (1788–1853)". Chemie in unserer Zeit. 22 (6): 208–216. doi:10.1002/ciuz.19880220605.
- Petra Renate Stumm: Leopold Gmelin (1788–1853). Leben und Werk eines Heidelberger Chemikers. Universität Heidelberg, Dissertation, 2011 (online)
- Petra Stumm: Leopold Gmelin (1788–1853). Leben und Werk eines Heidelberger Chemikers. Neuere Medizin- und Wissenschaftsgeschichte, Centaurus Verlag & Media, Quellen und Studien Bd.33, 2012.
- Erich Pietsch (1939). "Leopold Gmelin – der Mensch, sein Werk und seine Zeit". Berichte der Deutschen Chemischen Gesellschaft (A and B Series). 72 (2): A5–A33. doi:10.1002/cber.19390720242.
