= Samuel Morlot =

Swiss officer and politician (1670–1763)

- Baptised: 27 January 1670; Bern, Switzerland
- Died: 19 March 1763; Muri bei Bern, Switzerland
- Occupations: Officer; politician
- Spouse: Maria Magdalena von Graffenried (m. 1700)
- Relatives: Franz Ludwig Morlot (brother)

Samuel Morlot (baptized 27 January 1670 – 19 March 1763) was a Bernese officer and politician. After a career in Dutch service, he held offices in the Bernese state, including bailiff of Grandson, banneret (Venner) and treasurer of the French-speaking territories (Welschseckelmeister). He built the New Castle (Neues Schloss) in Gerzensee and the summer residence of Märchligen in Allmendingen.

== Biography ==
Samuel Morlot was a member of the Morlot family. He was the son of David, a bailiff (Landvogt), and Johanna von Erlach, and the brother of Franz Ludwig Morlot. In 1700 he married Maria Magdalena von Graffenried, daughter of Johann Anton von Graffenried.

After his career in Dutch service, which he ended as a captain, Morlot entered the service of the Bernese state. From 1701 he was a member of the Grand Council, from 1715 to 1720 bailiff of Grandson, and from 1726 a member of the Small Council. He was banneret (Venner) of the butchers' guild (zu Metzgern) in 1731–1734, 1751–1756 and 1763, and treasurer of the French-speaking territories (Welschseckelmeister) from 1734 to 1740. Between 1727 and 1739 he served several times as an envoy to the Bernese–Fribourg diets (Tagsatzungen).

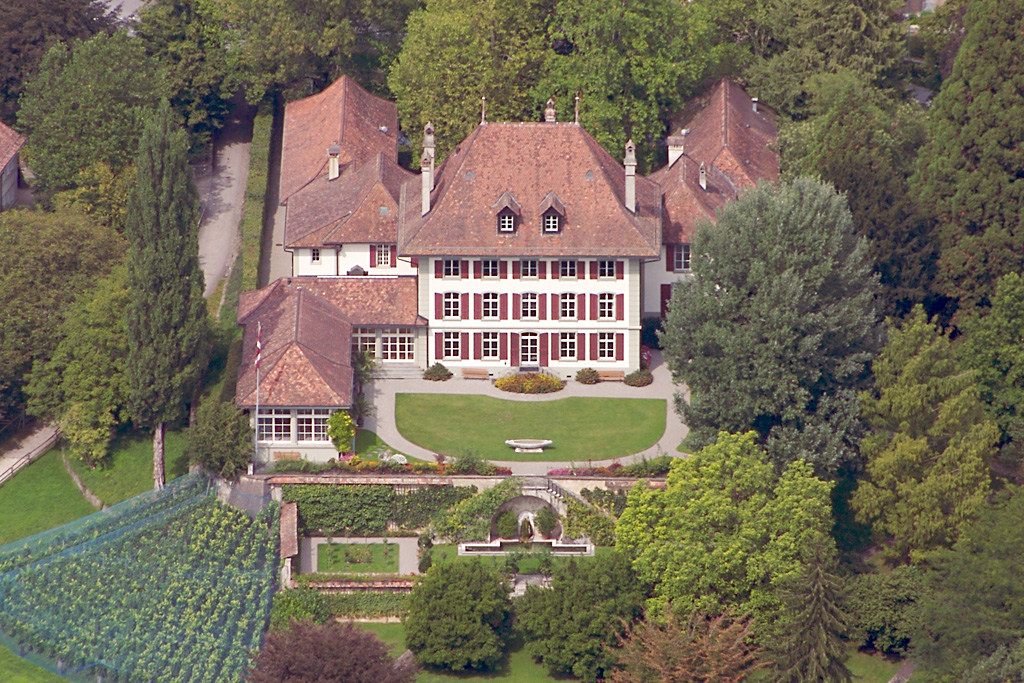
The New Castle (Neues Schloss) in Gerzensee

In 1700 Morlot built the house known as the New Castle (Neues Schloss) in Gerzensee, and in 1723 the summer residence of Märchligen in Allmendingen. He died in Muri bei Bern in 1763.

== Bibliography ==
- B. von Rodt, Genealogien burgerlicher Geschlechter der Stadt Bern, 4, 96 (manuscript, 1950, Burgerbibliothek Bern)
