= Friedrich Mohs =

German geologist and mineralogist (1773–1839)

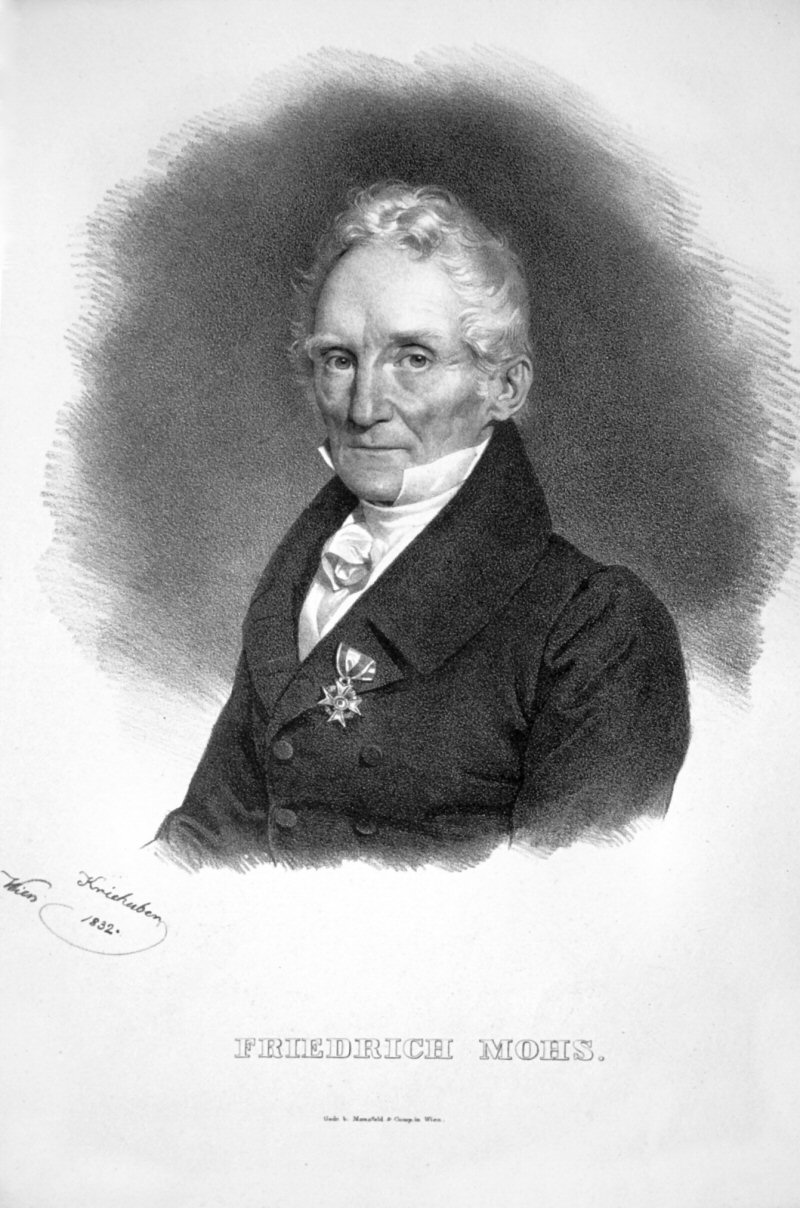
- Friedrich Mohs, 1832
- Born: 29 January 1773; Gernrode, Anhalt-Bernburg, Holy Roman Empire
- Died: 29 September 1839 (aged 66); Agordo, Lombardy–Venetia, Austrian Empire
- Education: University of Halle
- Known for: Mohs scale of mineral hardness
- Scientific career
- Fields: Geology, mineralogy

Carl Friedrich Christian Mohs (/moʊz/ MOHZ, German: [ˈfʁiːdʁɪç ˈmoːs]; 29 January 1773 – 29 September 1839) was a German chemist and mineralogist. He was the creator of the Mohs scale of mineral hardness. Mohs also introduced a classification of the crystal forms in crystal systems independently of Christian Samuel Weiss.

== Early life and education ==
Mohs was born on 29 January 1773, in Gernrode, in the Harz mountains, Anhalt-Bernburg (present-day Saxony-Anhalt, Germany). He showed an interest in science at an early age and received private education before entering the University of Halle. There, Mohs studied chemistry, mathematics and physics. In 1798, he joined the Mining Academy in Freiberg, Saxony, being a student of Abraham Gottlob Werner.

== Career ==
After acquiring the job of a foreman at a mine in 1801, Mohs relocated in 1802 to Austria, where he was employed in trying to identify the minerals in a private collection of the banker J. F. van der Nüll. Mohs described this collection, and a catalogue was printed and published. In 1812 he relocated to Graz where he was employed by Archduke Johann in his newly established museum and academy of science, which was divided subsequently into the Joanneum and the Graz University of Technology. In 1818, Mohs was appointed successor of his former professor at the Freiberg Mining Academy, A. G. Werner, who died in 1817. In 1826 Mohs became full professor of mineralogy at the University of Vienna. At the same time he was assigned curator of the Imperial Mineralogical Collection, into which the van der Nüll collection of minerals was incorporated in 1827. In 1835, Mohs resigned. He became Bergrat which meant being an imperial counselor in charge of mining affairs, published by orders from his department an instruction on mining, and was commissioned with the establishment of a montanistic museum in Vienna.

== Mineral properties ==
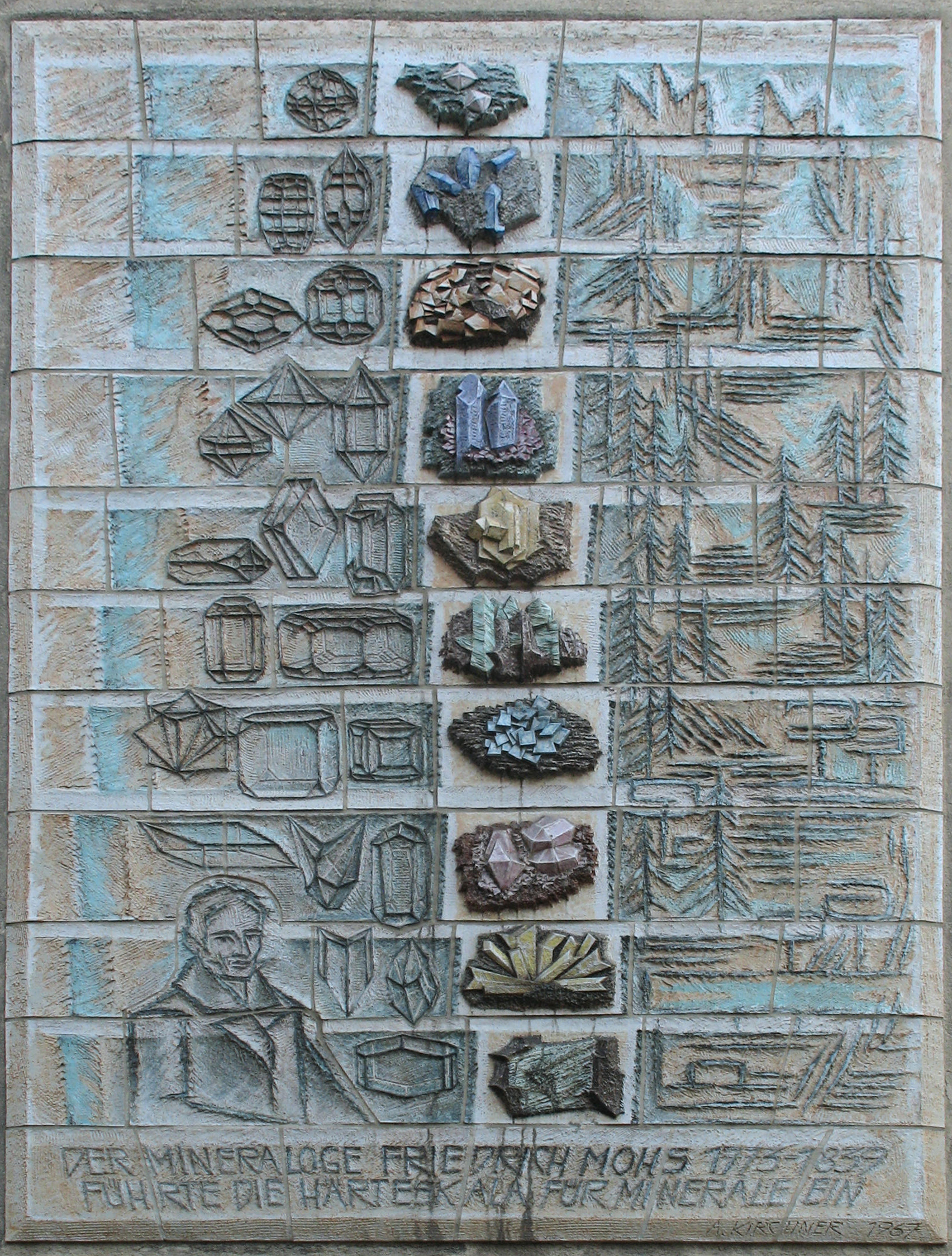
Memorial plaque in Vienna

As part of this task, he started classifying minerals by their physical characteristics, instead of their chemical composition, as had been done traditionally. This emphasis on physical characteristics was at odds with the prevailing chemical systematics. However, both Theophrastus and Pliny the Elder had compared the relative hardness of minerals known to them during ancient times, including diamond and quartz. They knew that diamond could scratch quartz, so showing it to be harder. This became the basis of the hardness scale developed by Mohs. The hardest mineral, diamond, was given a value of 10 and softer minerals such as talc were given the value of 1. Other minerals were given values intermediate, depending on their ability to scratch another mineral in the scale. Thus gypsum was given the value 2 because it will scratch talc crystals, and calcite the value 3 because it will scratch gypsum. Minerals are also now classified by chemical characteristics, but the physical properties are still useful for field examination.

In 1812, Mohs became a professor in Graz. In 1818, Mohs was appointed professor at his alma mater in Freiberg. In 1826, Mohs was a professor in Vienna.

== Personal life and death ==
In 1816, Mohs settled in Vienna. Two years later, he relocated to Freiberg, Saxony. Mohs died during a journey to Agordo, Italy (then in the Austrian Lombardy–Venetia) in 1839, at the age of 66.

== See also ==
- Geometrical crystallography before X-rays

== Notes ==
Sources

- Authier, André (2013). Early Days of X-ray Crystallography. Oxford University Press. ISBN 978-0-19-965984-5.
