= Franz Ludwig Morlot =

Swiss officer and politician (1667–1725)

- Baptised: 11 August 1667; Bern, Switzerland
- Died: 6 February 1725; Bern, Switzerland
- Occupations: Officer; politician
- Spouse: Katharina Lombach (m. 1695)
- Relatives: Samuel Morlot (brother); Rudolf Stettler (grandson)

Franz Ludwig Morlot (baptized 11 August 1667 – 6 February 1725) was a Bernese officer and politician. He rose to the rank of captain in Dutch service and then held offices in the Bernese state, becoming a member of the Small Council in 1719 and banneret (Venner) in 1723.

== Biography ==
Franz Ludwig Morlot was a member of the Morlot family. He was the son of David, a bailiff (Landvogt), and Johanna von Erlach, and the brother of Samuel Morlot. In 1695 he married Katharina Lombach, daughter of Anton. He was the grandfather of the officer Rudolf Stettler.

Morlot first made a career in Dutch service, where he rose to the rank of captain. He then entered the service of the Bernese state: from 1701 he was a member of the Grand Council, from 1711 to 1717 administrator of the chapter of St. Vincent (Stiftschaffner), from 1719 a member of the Small Council, from 1721 to 1723 master of the arsenal (Zeugherr vom Rat), and from 1723 until his death banneret (Venner) of the butchers' guild (zu Metzgern). In 1720 and 1723 he was an envoy to the Bernese–Fribourg diets (Tagsatzungen) for the auditing of the accounts of the common bailiwicks.

== Bibliography ==
- B. von Rodt, Genealogien burgerlicher Geschlechter der Stadt Bern, 4, 94 (manuscript, 1950, Burgerbibliothek Bern)
