= Christian Gmelin =

German chemist (1792–1860)

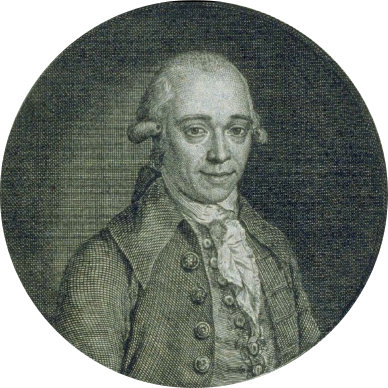

Christian Gottlob Gmelin (12 October 1792 – 13 May 1860) was a German chemist. He was born in Tübingen, Holy Roman Empire, and was a grandson of Johann Konrad Gmelin and a great-grandson of Johann Georg Gmelin.

== Scientific career ==
In 1818, Gmelin was one of the first to observe that lithium salts give a bright red color in a flame.

In 1826, Jean-Baptiste Guimet was credited with having devised a process for the artificial manufacture of ultramarine. Two years later, in 1828, Gmelin published his own process for the artificial manufacture of ultramarine. Since Gmelin was the first to publish this process, he received the recognition for this discovery. In his publication, Gmelin stated that silica, alumina, and soda are the main constituents of ultramarine and the rich color comes from sulfur.

== Death ==
Gmelin died in Tübingen, Germany, where he spent his entire life, on May 13, 1860.

== Works ==
- Einleitung in die Chemie . Vol.1&2 . Laupp, Thüringen 1835-1837 Digital edition by the University and State Library Düsseldorf
