= Stettler (surname) =

Stettler is a surname with German-language origins. It directly means someone from a town or city, roughly translating to "townsman" in English, and may have begun as a nickname. The surname may have more specific toponymic origins from Stettlen or Stödtlen.

Notable people with the surname include:

- Albrecht Friedrich Stettler (1796–1849), Swiss politician and legal scholar
- Anton Stettler (1587–1648), Swiss translator and bailiff
- Carl Stettler (1861–1920), Swiss-Canadian postmaster
- Céline Stettler (born 2001), Swiss floorball player
- Christian Stettler (born 1966), Swiss pastor and theologian
- Eduard Stettler (1803–1879), Swiss architect
- Eduard Stettler (1880–1940), Swiss Esperantist
- Emanuel Stettler (1925–2026), Swiss army officer
- Ernst Stettler (1921–2001), Swiss racing cyclist
- Eugen Stettler (1840–1913), Swiss architect
- Gordon Stettler (1900–1951), Australian rugby league footballer
- Gustav Stettler (1913–2005), Swiss artist
- Hanna Stettler (born 1964), Swiss pastor and theologian
- Heinrich Hüni-Stettler (1813–1876), Swiss businessman and politician
- Heinz Stettler (1952–2006), Swiss bobsledder
- Janice Stettler (born 2004), Swiss cyclist
- Karin Stettler (born 1988), Swiss soccer player
- Karl Ludwig Stettler (1773–1858), Swiss politician and historian
- Karl Stettler-von Rodt (1802–1870), Swiss patrician
- Kurt Stettler (1932–2020), Swiss soccer goalkeeper
- Kurt Stettler (1910–1974), Swiss racing cyclist
- Martha Stettler (1870–1945), Swiss painter and engraver
- Martin Stettler (born 1984), Swiss ice hockey player
- Michael Stettler (1580–1642), Swiss chronicler
- Michael Stettler (1913–2003), Swiss art historian
- Nicolas Stettler (born 1996), Swiss soccer player
- Robert Stettler, Swiss curler
- Rudolf Stettler (1731–1825), Bernese politician
- Rudolf Stettler (1746–1809), Bernese brigadier in Sardinian service
- Sonja Stettler Spinner (born 1969), Swiss soccer player
- Thomas Stettler (born 1969), Swiss politician
- Ulrich Stettler (born 1938), German political party official
- Wilhelm Stettler (1643–1708), Swiss painter

== See also ==
- Stettler family
