= Michael Stettler =

Michael Stettler may refer to:

- Michael Stettler (chronicler) (1580–1642), chronicler from Bern
- Michael Stettler (art historian) (1913–2003), Swiss art historian and museum director
