= Rudolf Stettler =

Rudolf Stettler may refer to:

- Rudolf Stettler (politician) (1731–1825), Bernese politician and treasurer of the German lands (Deutschseckelmeister)
- Rudolf Stettler (soldier) (1746–1809), Bernese officer and brigadier in Sardinian service
