= Stettler =

Stettler can mean the following:

== Places ==
- Stettler, Alberta, a town in Canada
  - County of Stettler No. 6, a municipal district in central Alberta, Canada
  - Drumheller-Stettler, a provincial electoral district in Alberta, Canada
  - Lacombe-Stettler, a defunct electoral district
  - Stettler (provincial electoral district), a defunct electoral district
  - Stettler Airport, a registered aerodrome near Stettler, Alberta
- Frank C. Stettler House, a historic building in Portland, Oregon

== Other uses ==
- Stettler (surname), a Swiss and German family name
- Stettler family, a Bernese patrician family
- Stettler Lightning, an ice hockey team
- HMCS Stettler, a Royal Canadian Navy River-class frigate named after the town
