= Trostburg Castle =

Castle in Teufenthal, Aargau, Switzerland

- Teufenthal
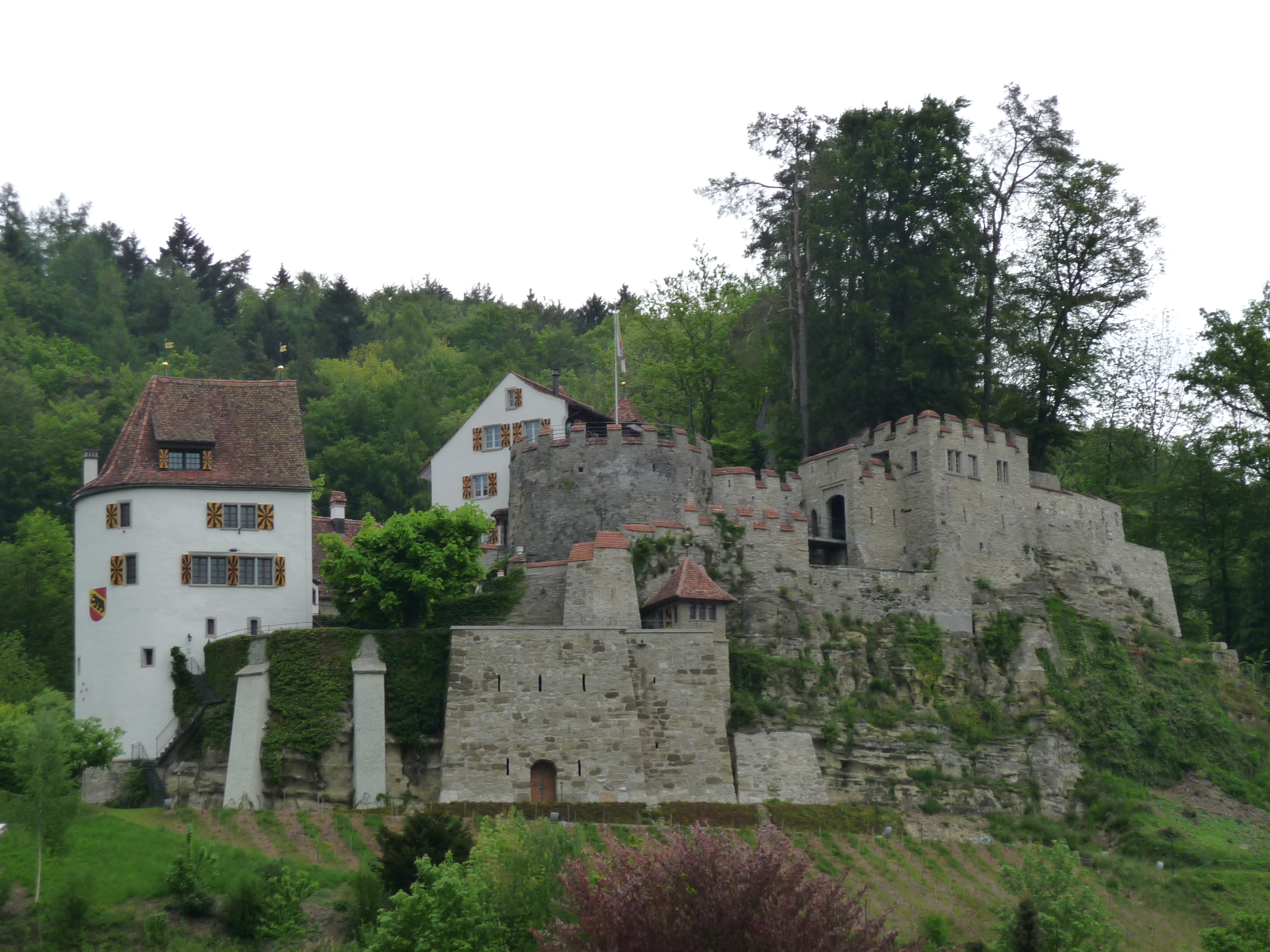
- Trostburg from a nearby street

Site information
- Type: hill castle
- Code: CH-AG
- Condition: preserved

Location
- Location within Switzerland
- Coordinates: 47°19′51.38″N 8°07′06.49″E
- Height: Height missing, see template documentation

Site history
- Built: 1200

Trostburg Castle is a small castle in the municipality of Teufenthal in the canton of Aargau in Switzerland.

== History ==
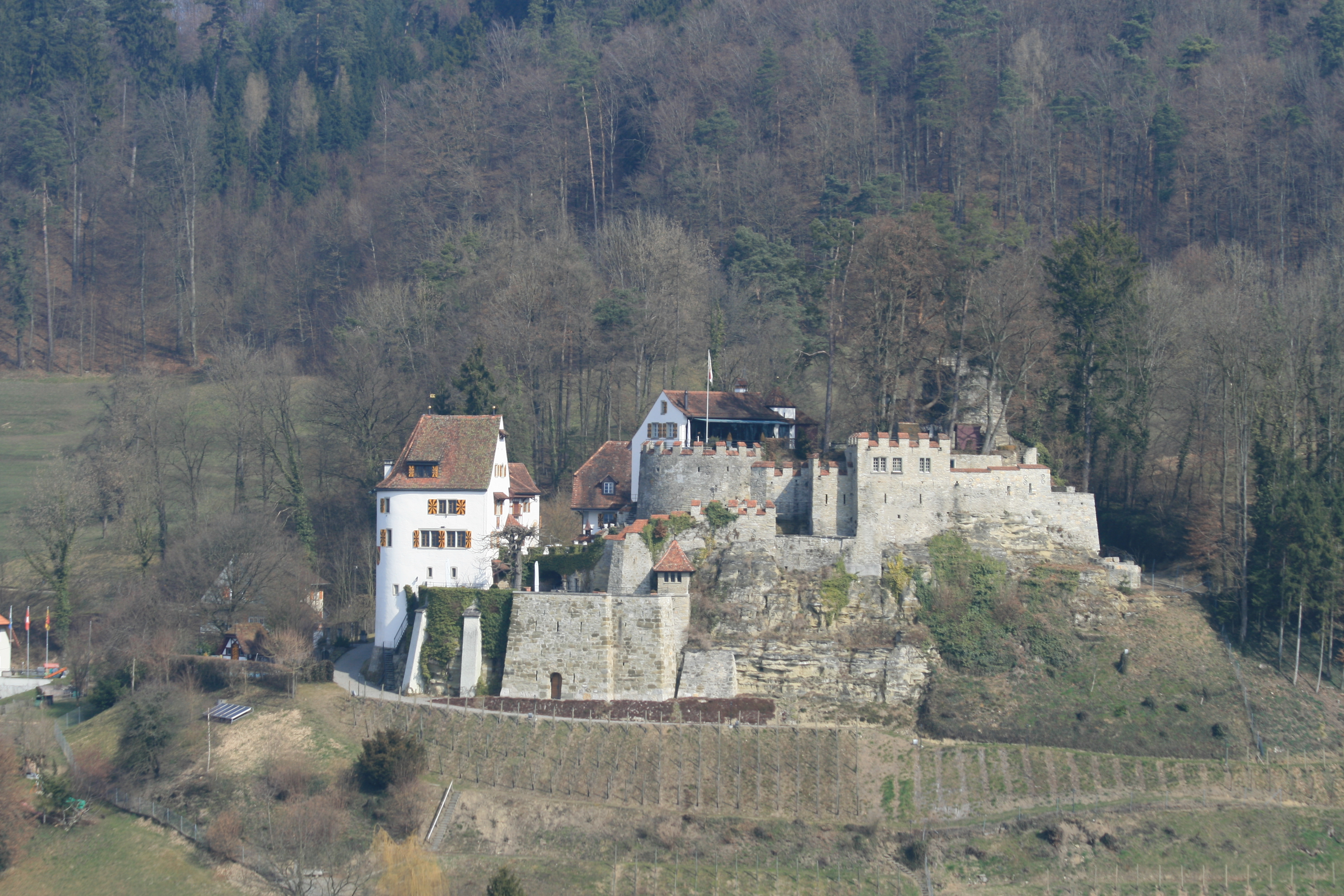
Trostburg Castle

The castle was probably built in the 12th century, though nothing is known of its early history. At some point in the 12th or early 13th century, a junior line moved a short distance away and built Liebegg Castle near Gränichen. On 28 May 1241, Burkhart I of Trostberg and his relative Ludwig of Liebegg appear in a document as witnesses and unfree knights in service to the Counts of Kyburg. In 1253, Burkhart signed his name as Burchardus Barhandus de Trostberc. Eventually they passed from Kyburg service to Habsburg service. In 1317, a knight named Rudolf von Trostberg was the Habsburg vogt at Kyburg Castle.

Around the mid-14th century, the Trostburg line died out. The castle and surrounding estates were inherited by the Lords of Rinach. In 1415, the city-state of Bern conquered the Aargau from the Habsburgs. The owner of the castle, Hans Rudolf von Rinach, kept his castle and lands, but was forced to accept Bernese authority and grant them a preeminent right to buy it. In 1486, the Schultheiss and council of Bern decided to sell Trostburg along with its lands and serfs to Hans von Hallwil, the victor of the Battle of Murten.

Under the Hallwil family, the castle was fortified and expanded with a chapel and residence hall (known as the Hallwil House) added on the northwest side of the site. It remained with the Hallwil family for 130 years. In 1616, Hugo von Hallwil moved to Bohemia and tried to sell the castle to the city of Brugg. Apparently, fearing that Brugg was expanding its influence, the city of Bern quickly bought the castle and then sold it to a cooperative of wealthy Bernese citizens. Bern retained the rights to high justice and some income, which they transferred to Lenzburg Castle. Over the following century, the castle fell into ruin except for the Hallwil House. In 1754, it was described as looking like a peasant's hovel.

In the 19th century, the castle was converted into a music box factory. In the early 20th century, it was partly rebuilt by a German butcher, but World War I hindered project completion. A large part of the western curtain wall collapsed in 1922. In 1933, it was acquired by another private owner who used the castle as his private residence. An archeological project in 1999 explored the history of the castle and also repaired and strengthened many of its walls.

== Castle site ==
The castle is located on the same line of hills on which Liebegg Castle stands and the remaining castle walls wrap around the local hill top. The bergfried is a square 6.6 meters (22 ft) on each side and about 7 meters (23 ft) tall. The hill falls away from the tower toward the north, with a courtyard south and west. West and north of the courtyard the ground slopes down toward the Hallwil House. The residence building is four stories tall with massive walls that are between 1–1.7 m (3.3–5.6 ft) thick.

== See also ==
- List of castles and fortresses in Switzerland

== Literature ==
- Rolf Bolliger and Markus Widmer-Dean: Trostburg - Liebegg, 376 Pages, Verlag Widmer-Dean, 2005
- Stettler, Michael (1948). Die Kunstdenkmäler des Kantons Aargau. Vol. 1, Bezirke Aarau, Kulm, Zofingen. Basel: Birkhäuser Verlag. pp. 234–236.
