= Lenzburg Castle =

Castle in Lenzburg, Aargau, Switzerland

- Lenzburg
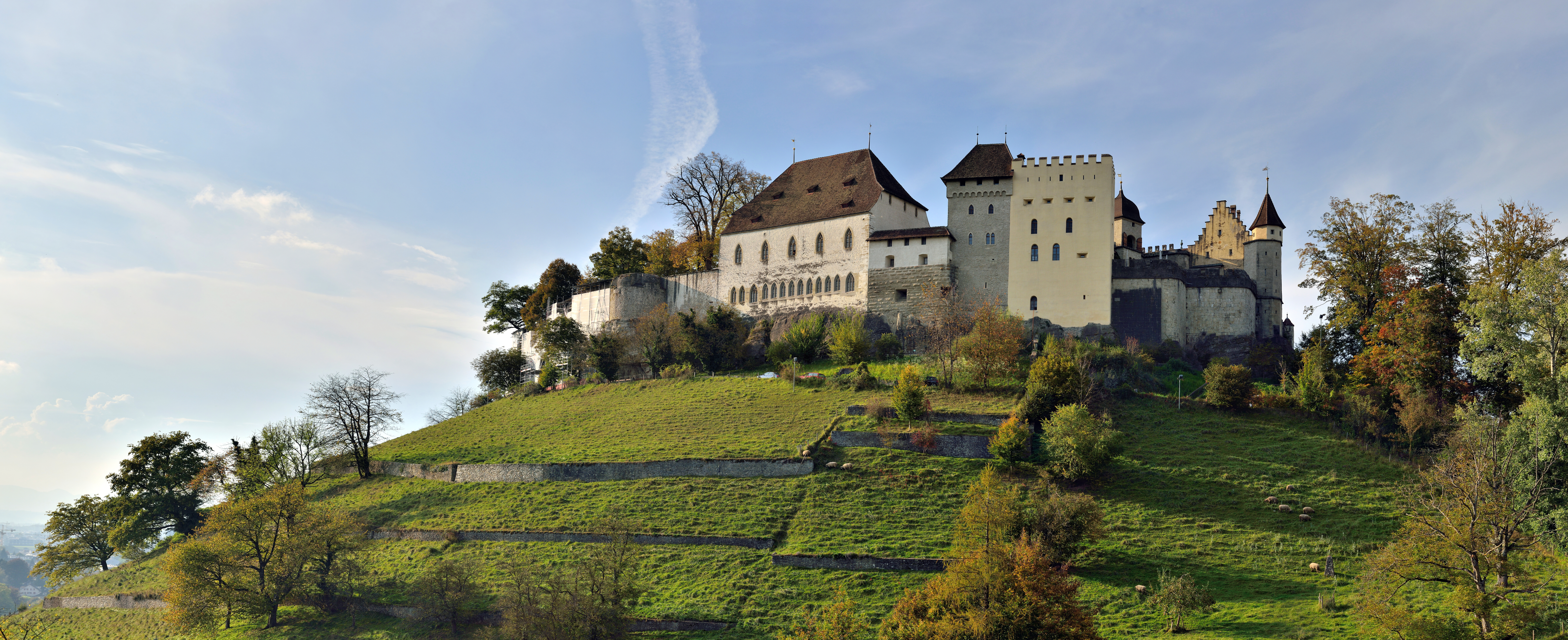
- Lenzburg Castle from the southeast

Site information
- Type: hill castle
- Code: CH-AG
- Condition: preserved

Location
- Location within Switzerland
- Coordinates: 47°23′15″N 8°11′08″E
- Height: 508 m above the sea

Site history
- Built: before 1036

Lenzburg Castle (German: Schloss Lenzburg) is a castle located above the old part of the town of Lenzburg in the Canton of Aargau, Switzerland. It ranks among the oldest and most important of Switzerland. The castle stands on the almost circular castle hill (altitude: 504 m), which rises approximately 100 m (330 ft) over the surrounding plain but is only about 250 m (820 ft) in diameter. The oldest parts of the castle date to the 11th century, when the Counts of Lenzburg built it as their seat. The castle, its historical museum and the castle hill with its Neolithic burial grounds are listed as heritage sites of national significance.

== History ==
The prominent hill was already a settlement site in prehistoric times. For example, in 1959 a Neolithic gravesite was uncovered in the carpark. There have also been small discoveries from the Roman and Alemannic eras.

A legend tells that there was once a dragon living in a cave in the hillside, who was defeated by two knights, Wolfram and Guntram. The grateful people made the two Counts of Lenzburg and gave them permission to build a castle on the hilltop.

=== Seat of nobility ===
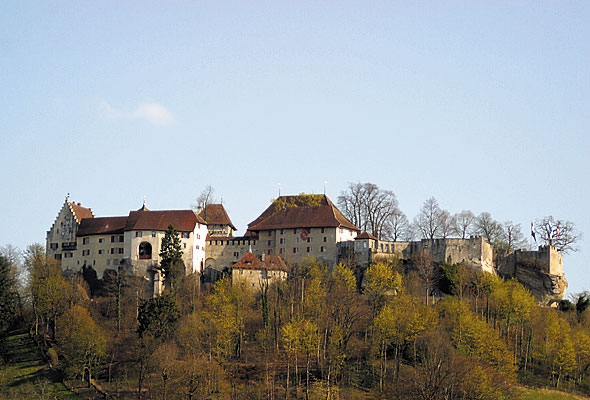
View of the castle from the north

A charter dated 1036 names one Ulrich, Count of Aargau. He was the Emperor's Vogt in Zürich and overseer of the abbeys of Beromünster and Schänis. The first definite record of the existence of a castle dates to 1077: Ulrich's grandson, also Ulrich, had taken the emperor's position in the Investiture Controversy and imprisoned two Papal legates for half a year. At that time the Counts of Lenzburg were among the most important feudal lords on the Swiss Plateau and maintained close connections to the emperor.

The line died out in 1173. Ulrich IV, the last Count of Lenzburg, named Emperor Friedrich I Barbarossa as his personal heir in his will; they had been on the Second Crusade together. The emperor came to Lenzburg Castle and personally supervised the division of the estate, giving a majority of the lands to his son, the Count palatine Otto of Burgundy. However, after Otto's death in 1200, the House of Hohenstaufen was forced to withdraw from the Aargau. By way of two neighbouring aristocratic houses (Andechs-Merania and Chalon), in about 1230 Lenzburg castle came by marriage into the possession of the Counts of Kyburg. They then founded a fortified market settlement at the western base of the castle hill, today's town of Lenzburg.

Hartmann, the last Count of Kyburg, died in 1264 without male issue. Rudolph I, Count of Habsburg and later King of the Romans, placed the heir, Anna of Kyburg, under his protection and she later married Eberhard I of Habsburg-Laufenburg. In 1273 Rudolph took possession of the estate from his impoverished relatives and in 1275 held court there. However, the castle then declined into a regional seat of government, as the power of the Habsburgs shifted more and more to Austria. On 20 August 1306, Lenzburg received its charter as a town from Count Frederick the Fair. From 1339 on, Count Frederick II of Tyrol-Austria resided at the castle. He was to have married a daughter of King Edward III of England and had the Knights' Hall built for the purpose, but died in 1344 without ever seeing his bride, and the building remained incomplete. After 1369, the Schultheiss-Ribi family were tenants of the castle. In 1375 the castle underwent a siege by the Gugler.

=== Bernese rule ===
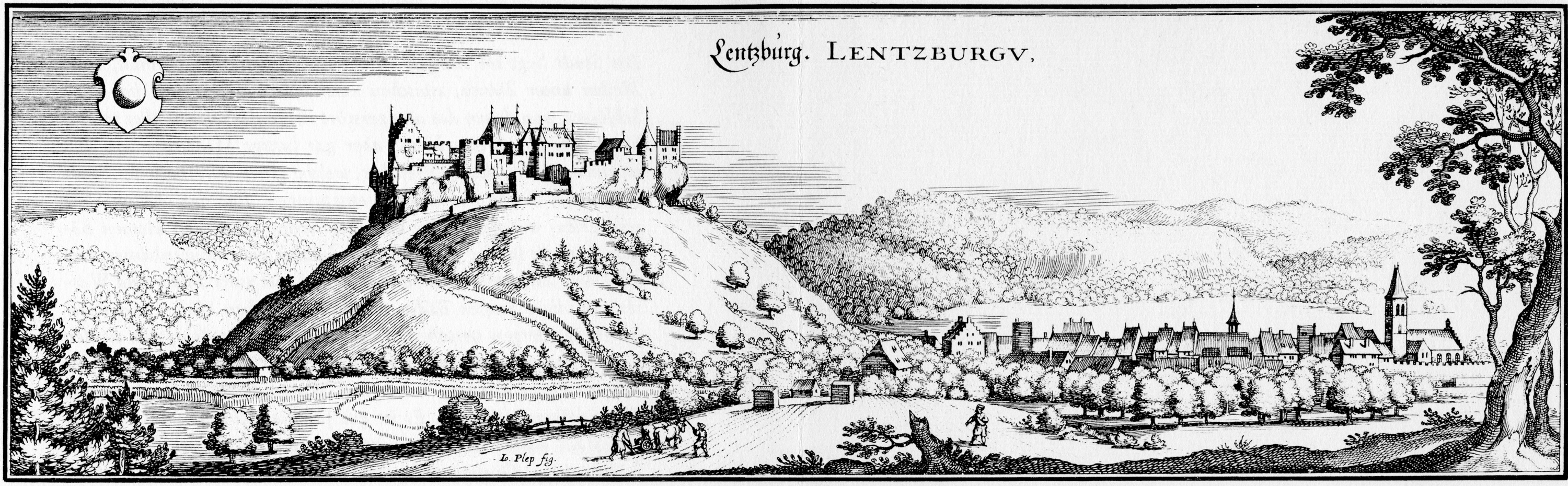
View of Lenzburg and Lenzburg Castle in about 1642, by Matthäus Merian

The latent tensions between Sigismund, King of Germany and Frederick IV, Duke of Austria exploded in 1415 at the Council of Constance, when Frederick assisted one of the three then reigning popes, Antipope John XXIII, in escaping from the town. Sigismund took the opportunity to harm his opponent, ordering his neighbours to seize his lands in the name of the Empire. Bern willingly conquered the western part of the Aargau.

The town of Lenzburg immediately surrendered to the advancing army on 20 April, but the castle for the moment remained untouched by the conflict. Konrad of Weinsberg, the king's representative, attempted to secure it for the Empire and had it prepared for a siege. But by August he saw the futility of this plan and in 1418 returned the castle to the control of the Schultheiss family. After lengthy negotiations, Bern was able to secure control of the County of Lenzburg as subtenants in 1433 and finally in 1442 of the castle.

The first Bernese Landvogt took up residence in the castle in 1444, governing the district of Lenzburg from there. The duties of a Landvogt included collecting taxes, implementing administrative measures, judicial and police tasks and the power of military decree; they were also responsible for the upkeep of the castle. The Landvogt was elected from the ranks of the city council of Bern for four–year terms. The best known Landvogt of Lenzburg was Adrian I of Bubenberg, from 1457 to 1461, later Schultheiß of Bern and hero of the Battle of Morat.

In 1509–10, extensive work was carried out at the castle, including partial demolition and rebuilding of the unfinished Knights' Hall. In 1518 there was a serious fire; which buildings were destroyed is not recorded (most likely the Arburghaus on the north side). In 1520 the Landvogt received a new residence, the Landvogtei. During the Second War of Kappel in 1531, the castle served as base of operations for the Protestants.

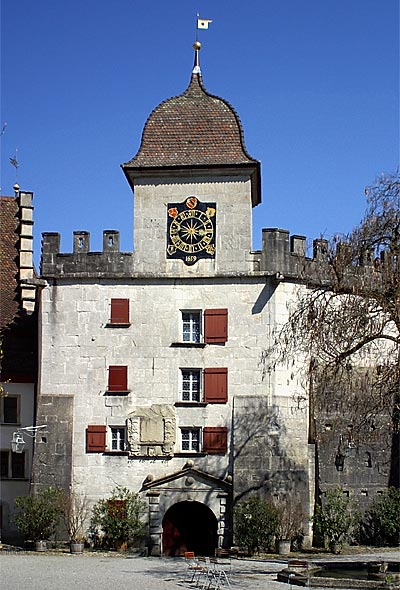
The east bastion

In 1624 Landvogt Joseph Plepp drew the first precise drawings and plans of the castle, which at the time had more the appearance of a fortified farmhouse. His plans formed the basis for plans to expand it into a fortress. As the first step, in 1625 a double curtain wall and double gatehouse were constructed in a new position in the north section and the height of the earthen embankments on the east and south sides was increased. From 1642 to 1646, a wall eleven metres high was raised to form the east bastion. However, lack of money prevented execution of the remaining projects. Also, the east bastion had a major disadvantage: rainwater seeped through the adjacent walls and rendered the Landvogt's residence uninhabitable due to persistent damp. For this reason a new residence was constructed in the north section between 1672 and 1674.

During the 18th century, the Bernese developed the castle into a large grain store. For this purpose, the individual buildings were connected and partially hollowed out. By this means storage for over 5,000 tonnes of wheat was provided.

In March 1798, Viktor von Wattenwyl, the 71st and last Landvogt, surrendered the castle to the advancing French troops.

=== Leasehold and private possession ===
In 1803 the Canton of Aargau was founded, and a year later the castle passed into its possession. The cantonal authorities were uncertain what use should be made of the castle and so it stood empty for almost twenty years. Using it for governmental purposes was out of the question for this symbol of the rule of the downtrodden. Finally, Christian Lippe, a teacher active in Hofwil, showed an interest. He rented the castle and in 1822 opened an educational institution based on the principles of Johann Heinrich Pestalozzi. While it flourished, it had 50 students and 12 teachers, with above all sons of prominent manufacturing families in Basel and Alsace receiving their education there. The Hintere Haus or rear building was used as the school building while the teachers lived in the Landvogtei. In 1853 the institution had to close because Lippe was gravely ill.

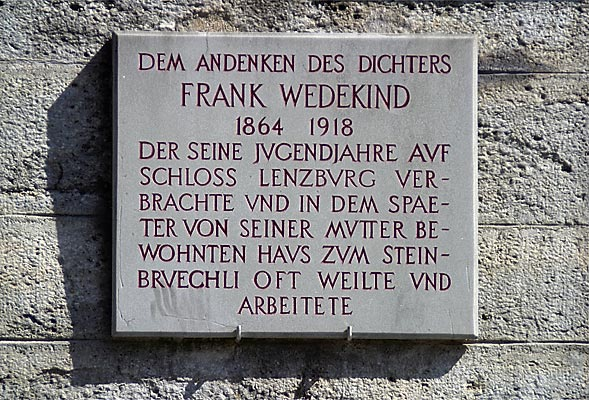
Plaque at the castle commemorating Frank Wedekind, 'who spent his childhood years at Lenzburg Castle and often stayed and worked at the house in which his mother later resided, Zum Steinbrüchli'

In 1860, the canton sold the castle for 60,000 francs to Konrad Pestalozzi-Scotchburn of Zürich. Little is known about him. In 1872, for 90,000 francs, the castle came into the possession of Friedrich Wilhelm Wedekind. He had emigrated to San Francisco after the failure of the March Revolution of 1849 and there made a sizeable fortune speculating in land during the California Gold Rush. Returning to Europe in 1864, in protest against Prussian domination of the German Empire he emigrated once more, this time to Switzerland, and settled in the castle. His 6 children, among them the singer Erika Wedekind and the authors Frank Wedekind and Donald Wedekind, spent their childhoods there.

To make division of the inheritance possible, the Wedekind family sold the castle in 1893 for 120,000 francs to the American industrialist Augustus Edward Jessup. He was from Philadelphia, but was a long-time resident of England. He was married to Mildred Marion Bowes-Lyon, the aunt of the Queen Mother, Elizabeth Bowes-Lyon, and thus allied by marriage to the British royal family. Under Jessup's leadership, the castle underwent a comprehensive renovation and by dismantling of the newer construction and military facilities was largely returned to its condition in the Middle Ages. In addition, he furnished the interiors with expensive furniture and installed modern facilities such as central heating, plumbing and electricity. He defrayed the half a million francs in costs from his personal fortune.

Another American industrial magnate, James Ellsworth, who collected medieval art, learnt that Lenzburg Castle contained a table from the period of Friedrich Barbarossa. Wishing to add it to his collection, he found it impossible to purchase it without also purchasing the entire castle. As a result, the castle changed hands in 1911 for 550,000 francs. His son, the Polar explorer Lincoln Ellsworth, inherited the castle in 1925 but lived there only intermittently.

=== Recent history ===
After Lincoln Ellsworth's death in 1951, ownership of the castle passed to his widow Marie Louise Ellsworth-Ulmer. She sold the castle in 1956, together with its contents for 500,000 francs to a foundation set up by the town of Lenzburg and the Canton of Aargau. This made it possible to open the castle to the public. In 1960, the Stapferhaus Lenzburg cultural foundation was established and moved into the Hintere Haus. Between 1978 and 1986, the castle was once more thoroughly renovated, and a French-style garden established in the southwest section. In 1987, the canton transferred its comprehensive cultural history collections to the castle and opened the Historisches Museum Aargau (Historical Museum of the Aargau), which in 2007 became the Museum Aargau (Aargau Museum). Since 2009, the displays have been undergoing renovation in stages.

=== Owners of Lenzburg Castle ===
- c. 1000–1173: Counts of Lenzburg
- 1173: Emperor Barbarossa
- 1173–1273: Counts of Kyburg
- 1273–1415: Dukes and kings of Habsburg
- 1415–1798: City of Bern (in full possession from 1433, seat of the Landvogt from 1444)
- 1803–1860: Canton of Aargau (rented from 1822 to 1853 as a boarding school)
- 1860–1872: Konrad Pestalozzi Scotchburn
- 1872–1893: Dr. Friedrich Wilhelm Wedekind (father of the playwright Frank Wedekind)
- 1893–1911: Augustus Edward Jessup
- 1911–1925: James W. Ellsworth
- 1925–1951: Lincoln Ellsworth, son of James
- 1951–1956: Marie Louise Ellsworth-Ulmer, widow of Lincoln
- 1956–present: Canton of Aargau (through a joint foundation with the town of Lenzburg)

== Castle buildings ==
The entrance to the castle is on the northeast side. Via either the old castle path or a stairway, one comes to the lower gatehouse, built in 1625, and then to the outer curtain wall. Inside the middle gatehouse (which was also built in 1625 and enlarged in 1761–62), the path makes a 180° turn and leads up to the drawbridge and through the inner gatehouse into the inner bailey.

On the east side, the inner bailey is protected and has 7 buildings arranged in a horseshoe. On the southwest side, the French-style garden is enclosed within the curtain wall. While the ground is fairly level within the walls of the castle, outside it falls off rapidly. Only on the eastern side, where it is possible to cross to the Goffersberg (altitude: 507 m), is the slope less steep, forming a saddle-shaped depression.

=== North section ===
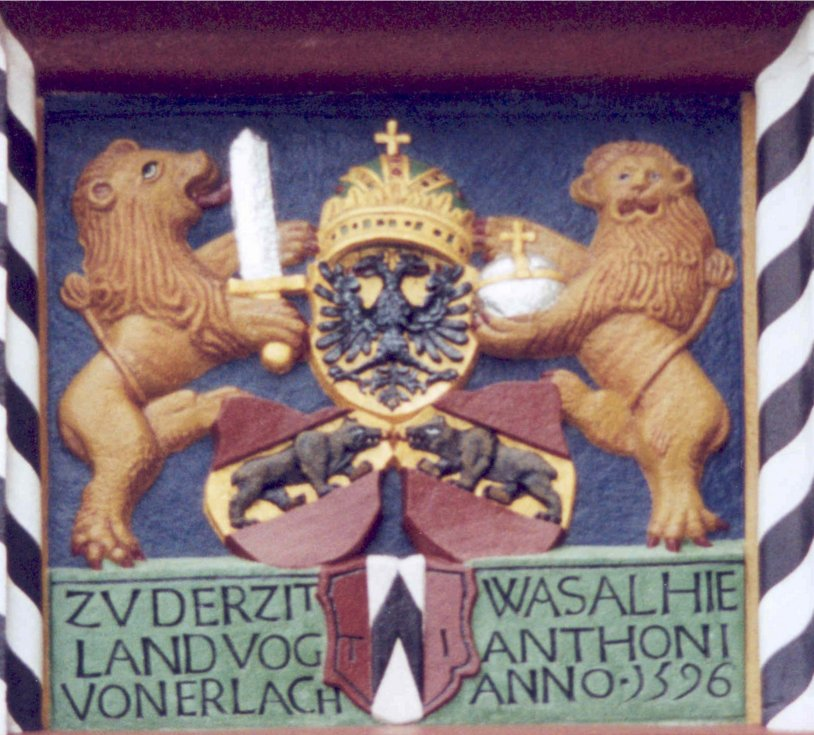
Arms of the Holy Roman Empire, the Canton of Bern and the von Erlach family above the upper gatehouse

The north section is a group of connected buildings, consisting of the upper gatehouse, the remains of the northern keep and the new Landvogt's residence.

The upper gatehouse, the only entrance to the inner bailey, was constructed in 1518, in part on older foundations. It is thought that this was the location of the 1330 Arburghaus which was destroyed in the fire. Above the doorway is a plaque dated 1596 combining the coats of arms of the Empire, the Canton of Bern and the von Erlach family, and naming Anthoni von Erlach as Landvogt.

To the east of the gatehouse stands the north keep, since the complete rebuilding of 1718–20 connected to the adjacent buildings. The gatehouse and dungeons were once located here. Of the original building only the west wall and parts of the foundation of the south and east walls remain.

The new Landvogt's residence was built in 1672–74 on the site of a 1625 guardhouse and laundry. The neighbouring Landvogtei at the northeast corner was at the time no longer inhabitable because of penetration of the walls by damp following the construction of the east bastion. Today the administrative centre of the Aargau Museum is located here.

=== Landvogt's residence ===
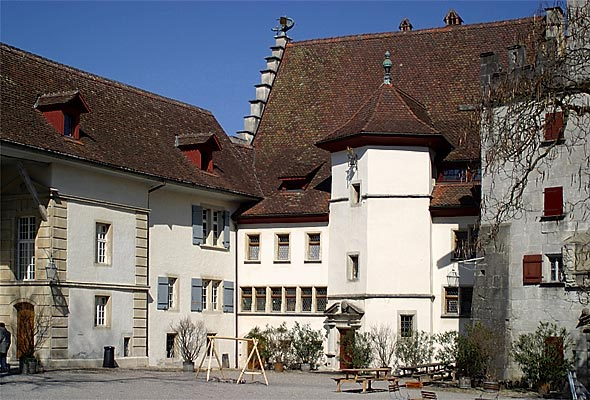
The Vogt's residence, or Landvogtei

The three-storey late Gothic Landvogtei with its stepped gable was built in 1520. It served as a new office and residence for the Bernese Landvögte after the destruction of the previous building dating to the 14th century in a fire in 1518. In contrast to the other buildings, the Landvogt's residence does not back directly up to the ring wall, but is separated from it by a 1 to 2-metre gap. The exception is a small round tower at the southeast corner; built in 1626, it replaced a protruding bay that served as an outhouse.

The pentagonal stairway tower which was attached to the façade in 1630 replaced a steep staircase within the building. Its original onion dome was replaced with a hip roof in 1760. The foyer still dates back in part to around 1460. On the first upper floor a gallery, constructed in 1565, extends the length of the north side.

From 1646 until 1894, the building was uninhabitable because of encroachment of damp after the construction of the east bastion. Renovation was only possible after the removal of the embankment in 1902. The renovation included a new façade facing the inner bailey. Today the building houses part of the Aargau Museum, with a permanent exhibit on the lives of the castle owners from the late Middle Ages until the 20th century.

=== East bastion ===
The bastion on the eastern perimeter of the inner bailey was constructed in 1642–46, replacing a curtain wall with battlements, to close the gap between the Palas and the Landvogt's residence and protect the castle from cannon bombardment from the Goffersberg. The adjacent residence was covered by a huge earthen embankment which absorbed moisture and rendered the building uninhabitable. In 1659, a clocktower was built on the east bastion; its pointed roof was replaced in 1760 with an onion dome.

In 1893–94, the exterior wall was lowered by 6.5 m, making it possible to free the walled-up windows on the south side of the Landvogt's residence, and to dry out the walls. A rose garden was laid out on top of the now lower embankment. During the comprehensive renovation of 1978–86, the last remnant of the embankment was removed and a basement level excavated, which now houses part of the Aargau Museum.

=== Palas ===
The Palas (residence of the Count) was built in 1100 as a 4-storey, 18 m high fortified building. Together with the adjacent tower, it is one of the oldest buildings in the castle complex. The entrance was originally on the second floor, accessible only by way of a wooden outdoor staircase. The main floor had a fireplace, the top floor had the sleeping accommodations, and the lower two floors were storerooms.

During the period of the Bernese Landvögte, the building was called the "Kill" because the torture chamber was located in it. In 1598–99 a new arched entrance was built on the ground floor. Between 1978 and 1986, the division of the floors and connection to the stairs were rearranged to make it possible to use the building for the Historical Museum.

=== Tower ===
The tower (also called the South Keep) is 10 m square and has walls 3 m thick. It was built on to the Palas around 1170 and used its west end as a boundary wall. After the death of Ulrich IV, who had ordered it built, the work stopped and the building remained incomplete for almost 200 years. It was only finished in 1344. During the period of Bernese rule, beginning approximately in the early 17th century, the gaol was located on the first floor; it can still be visited today.

To create more storage space for grain, in 1728–29 the tower and the neighbouring Knights' Hall, and the well between them, were joined with an unornamented utility building. This required the removal of the north façade, because the tower was not aligned with the Knights' Hall. In 1896, Augustus Jessup had the granary demolished and the tower returned to its original state. The well, first mentioned in 1369, was left in the open once more. During the renovation of 1978–86, the division of the floors and connection to the stairs were rearranged to accommodate part of the Historical Museum.

=== Knights' Hall ===
The construction of the Knights' Hall began in 1339 under Habsburg rule. Duke Frederick II of Tyrol-Austria intended to marry the daughter of King Edward III of England at Lenzburg Castle, and thus ordered a suitable Gothic residential building to be erected. However, the young duke died in 1344 shortly before work could be completed, and the walls remained unplastered.

In 1508 the western part was in such bad condition that it had to be demolished and rebuilt. In the eastern part the exterior walls were left standing, but the interior was completely rearranged here, too. The building received new rafters and several columns to improve its load-bearing capacity, and the walls were now plastered. The length of the building was somewhat reduced, as the exterior wall at the west end was rebuilt a little further east.

Around 1590 the building had increasingly declined into a large barn, with grain storage and wine pressing. In the same period, it acquired embrasures. In 1758, the interior was once more completely changed; newly constructed intermediate floors made it possible to store even more grains.

In 1893, the building was restored as far as was possible to its original condition. The intermediate floors were removed and the pointed-arched windows restored to the great hall on the upper floor. Today the hall can be rented for social events.

=== Stapfer House ===
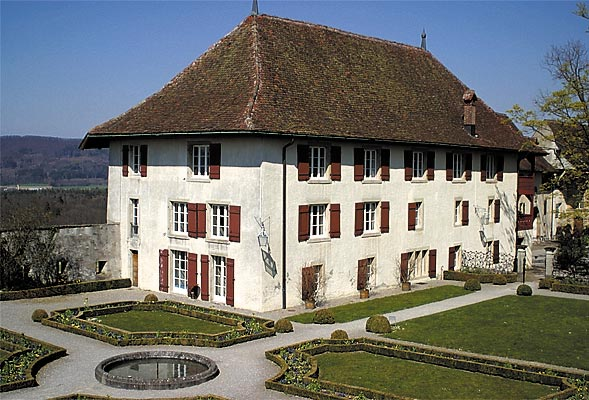
Stapfer House

In 1599–1600, a plain two-storey building was added on the southwest side of the castle complex, the Hintere Haus or rear building. It was created by uniting the stable and mill under one roof. In 1705–07, the building was lengthened on the east side to create additional grain storage capacity. From 1822 to 1853, the educational reformer Christian Lippe headed an educational institution at the castle which used advanced teaching principles for the period. In 1893 the granary extension was demolished and replaced by a reconstructed battlement leading to the upper gatehouse.

Today the rear building is Stapfer House, named for Philipp Albert Stapfer, a revolutionary and a minister in the Helvetic Republic. Since 1960 it has served as the Events Centre of the Stiftung Stapferhaus Lenzburg (Lenzburg Stapfer House Foundation), offering a variety of cultural activities such as exhibitions on current events.

== Aargau Museum ==
The Museum Aargau (Aargau Museum), until 2007 the Historisches Museum Aargau (Aargau Historical Museum), includes in addition to Lenzburg Castle Hallwyl Castle, and since 2009 Habsburg Castle and Königsfelden Abbey. It also has a collection of approximately 40,000 historic artefacts, assembled from various sources: cantonal property, private collections bequeathed to the canton, public collections, purchases, and gifts.

Lenzburg Castle contains five sections of the museum:

- Domestic museum: An exhibit on the way of life of the castle residents from the late Middle Ages through the Renaissance, the Baroque era, and the early modern period until 1900.
- Armoury: An exhibition of numerous weapons dating from the Middle Ages to the 18th century. The most valuable items are two swords which were used in the Battle of Sempach in 1386.
- Faith, Piety, Art: Various works of sacred art from the Canton of Aargau.
- The Culture of the Banquet and Silver from Aargau: An exhibit on 18th-century banqueting with numerous valuable table settings and secular silver.
- Children's museum in the attic of the Landvogt's residence.

The castle is reached from the carpark at the foot of the castle hill via a footpath or a lift between the tower and the Knights' Hall which provides access for the handicapped.

== Sources ==
- Hans Dürst and Hans Weber. Schloss Lenzburg und Historisches Museum Aargau. Aarau: AT Verlag, 1990. ISBN 3-85502-385-9
- Jean-Jacques Siegrist and Hans Weber. Burgen, Schlösser und Landsitze im Aargau. Aaarau: AT Verlag, 1984. ISBN 3-85502-199-6
- Michael Stettler and Emil Maurer. Die Kunstdenkmäler des Kantons Aargau, Bezirke Lenzburg und Brugg. pp. 121–136. Basel: Birkhäuser Verlag, 1953.
- Fritz Stuber, Jürg Lang et al. Stadtbilduntersuchung Altstadt Lenzburg. Zürich: Urbanistics, 1976. ISBN 3-85957-001-3
