= Vorburg =

Castle in Canton of Glarus, Switzerland

- Glarus Nord
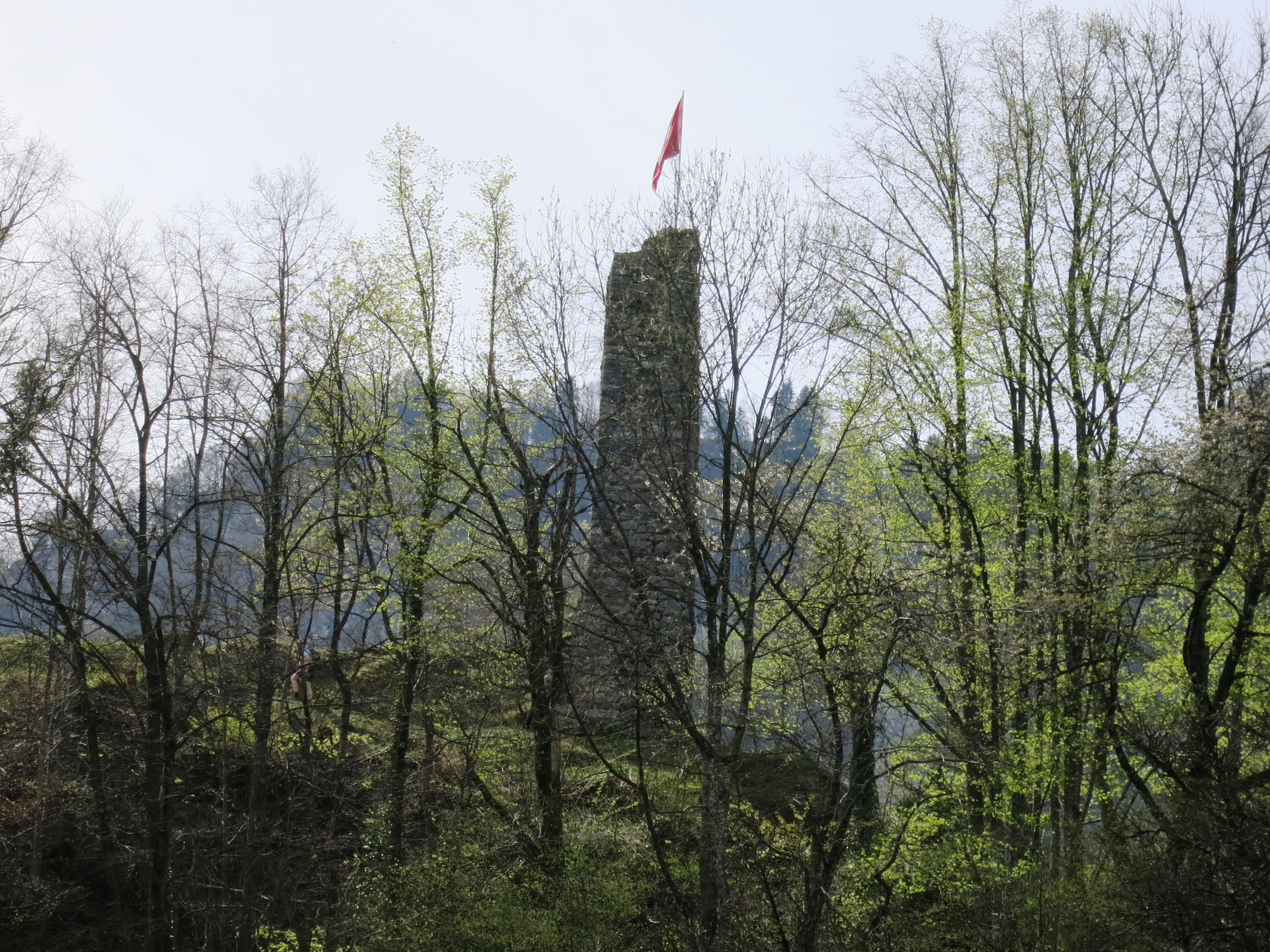
- Vorburg Castle

Site information
- Code: CH-GL
- Condition: Ruined

Location
- Coordinates: 47°07′05″N 9°03′26″E

Site history
- Built: 13th century
- Materials: Roughly finished Limestone

The Vorburg is a ruined castle located in the village of Oberurnen, now part of the municipality of Glarus Nord in the Canton of Glarus of Switzerland. It is the most significant castle in the canton.

== History ==
During the High Middle Ages the area around Oberurnen was owned by Schänis Abbey and paid taxes to Säckingen Abbey. In 1264 the Habsburgs inherited the bailiwick of Glarus from the Counts of Kyburg. About two decades later, in 1288, Säckingen Abbey granted them a fief over the abbey's lands as well. To consolidate their control over Glarus, the Habsburgs built Näfels Castle and probably also built or expanded Vorburg. By about 1300 the castle was a Habsburg administrative center. In the mid-14th century it was the residence of the Austrian Habsburg Vogt Hermann von Landenberg. In 1351 Glarus rebelled against the Habsburgs and attacked and destroyed Näfels Castle. They may have also attacked Vorburg, though there are no surviving records of this. The castle was probably expanded after the destruction of Näfels, either by the Habsburgs or Glarus. In 1369 it appears in a document when a Rudolf Stucki pledged the castle as collateral. In 1386 it was mentioned as a refuge castle and was probably not regularly inhabited. In the 15th century it was abandoned and fell into ruin. Many of the stones show evidence of a large fire in the castle, but whether it was an accident or due to an attack is unknown.

The north west wall of the tower was repaired and preserved during the 19th century. In 1940 the south ring wall was excavated and stabilized. An archeological excavation in 1970 discovered traces of an outbuilding as well as a layer of animal bones.

== Castle site ==
The ruins sit on a hill north of the village of Oberurnen. The north-west wall of the palas rise about 16 meters (52 ft) above the ground. The palas was a rectangle of 18 m × 21 m (59 ft × 69 ft) with walls that are about 2 m (6.6 ft) thick. The walls are made of roughly finished and squared limestone blocks with more carefully finished bossage stones at the corners. A newer wall connects the palas with a residential wing on the eastern side. South and west of the palas, a narrow zwinger and two ditches protected the castle. Traces of the foundations of a bridge over the north side of the inner ditch are still visible. The gatehouse was probably on the north side of the ring wall. The palas was probably built at the end of the 13th century, while the ring wall, zwinger and other out buildings are from the early 14th.

== See also ==
- List of castles and fortresses in Switzerland
