= Liebegg Castle =

Castle in Gränichen, Aargau, Switzerland

- Schloss Liebegg
- Gränichen
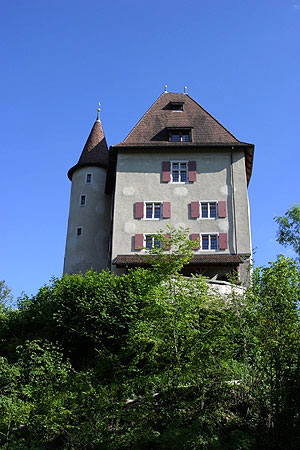
- Liebegg Castle

Site information
- Type: hill castle
- Code: CH-AG
- Condition: preserved

Location
- Coordinates: 47°20′11″N 8°07′04″E
- Height: 510 m above the sea

Site history
- Built: 1150-1200

Liebegg Castle is a small castle in the municipality of Gränichen in the canton of Aargau in Switzerland. It is located on a outcropping about 70 meters (230 ft) above the Wynental valley floor. The current castle grew out of a medieval castle. A cantonal agricultural school opened in 1958 near the castle.

== History ==
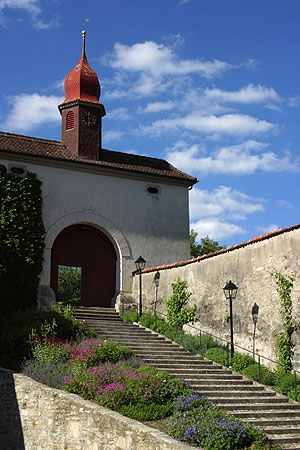
Gate and steps added in 1982

The origins of the castle and the von Liebegg family are unclear, though they were probably a junior line of the von Trostburg family. The first castle was probably built in the 2nd half of the 12th century. About a century later the second castle was built south of the first. The first mention of the family is in 1241 when Burkhard I and Ludwig von Liebegg appear as witnesses in a document. At that time they were unfree knights in the service of the Counts of Kyburg. When the Kyburg line died out, the Habsburgs became the overlord over Liebegg. The Habsburgs granted a half share to the Twing of Liebegg to the von Liebegg family. The other half was given by the Habsburgs to the Lords of Aarburg, who in turn granted it as an under-fief to the von Liebeggs. In 1415 the city-state of Bern invaded and captured the Aargau region from the Habsburgs. The castle was not attacked and the von Liebegg family retained their lands and castle under the new rulers. However, in 1433 Johann oder Hemmann von Liebegg, the last male heir of the family, died.

The castle and estates were inherited by Petermann von Luternau and his descendants. By the 16th century, they were one of the six most powerful families in Bern. At the height of their power, in 1561/62, Augustin von Luternau demolished the medieval castle, building on its site a late-Gothic residence. Today only traces of the original two castles remain. In 1602 they sold the castle to Marx Escher from the city of Zürich. A few years later, in 1615, he sold it to Reinhard Graviseth. Reinhard built a new castle and residence hall south of the Luternauhaus (Luternau House) in 1617. He owned the castle for about half a century, but in 1668 traded it to his brother in law Johann Friedrich von Breitenlandenberg. Then, in 1709 the Breitenlandenberg's traded Liebegg back to the Graviseth family. In 1772 the von Diesbach family inherited it from the Graviseths. A few decades later the 1798 French invasion and the Helvetic Republic swept away the old medieval system of noble landlords who ruled over villages and estates. While the von Diesbach family retained their castles, they lost their land holdings, including the Twing of Liebegg. In 1875 Friedrich Bernhart von Diesbach sold Liebegg Castle to the wealthy industrialist Guido Hunziker-Zuest from Aarau. His son, Julius Hunziker lived in the castle until his death in 1941. In 1946 the Canton of Aargau bought the castle from his heirs.

The Canton established a cantonal agricultural school in 1958 in the castle outbuildings. Between 1983 and 1998 the castle was home to the cantonal teacher's college. Today the castle is available to host meetings, conferences, weddings, celebrations and other events.

== Castle site ==
Today there are no visible traces of the medieval castle. The first or old castle stood on the highest point of hilltop, where the late-Gothic Luternauhaus now stands. The south wing of the Luternauhaus was demolished in 19th century when it fell into ruin. The second or new castle was south of the old and is now the site of 1617/18 Baroque residential palace. An earthquake in 1817 collapsed the western wall of the Baroque residential hall. Due to unstable foundations, it was moved back several meters and was rebuilt in the Neoclassic style.

== See also ==
- List of castles and fortresses in Switzerland
