= Daniel Rhagor =

Swiss horticultural writer (1577–1648)

- Baptised: 9 February 1577; Herzogenbuchsee, Switzerland
- Died: 1648; Bern, Switzerland
- Occupations: Official; writer
- Notable work: Pflantz-Gart (1639)
- Spouse: Susanna Bucher (m. 1597)
- Relatives: Anton Stettler (son-in-law)

Daniel Rhagor (also Ragor or Rhagorius; baptized 9 February 1577 – 1648) was a Bernese official and the author of the Pflantz-Gart (1639), the first systematically organized German-language guide to fruit growing, vegetable growing and viticulture in Switzerland.

== Biography ==
Daniel Rhagor was the son of Johann Ulrich, a pastor, and Christina Egglin. In 1597 he married Susanna Bucher, daughter of Jakob, a town clerk (Stadtschreiber). His daughter Susanna married Anton Stettler in 1616.

In 1601 Rhagor was elected to the Grand Council of Bern. He became clerk of the consistory (Chorschreiber) in 1604, bailiff (Landvogt) of Gottstatt in 1612, administrator of the wine cellars of the German-speaking territories (Teutsch-Weinschenk) in 1620, bailiff of Thorberg in 1625, registrar of the chancery (Gewölberegistrator) in 1631, and steward (Schaffner) of the Interlaken house (Interlakenhaus) in Bern in 1641. He died in Bern in 1648.

Engraved title page of the Pflantz-Gart, 1639

Rhagor was well versed in ancient and more recent horticultural literature and was an experienced practitioner. In 1639 he published the Pflantz-Gart, the first German-language, systematically organized guide to fruit growing, vegetable growing and viticulture in Switzerland; it already describes the potato and asparagus, for example. The book, fundamental for its time, reached a fifth edition in 1676.

== Bibliography ==
- S. Martini, "Daniel Rhagor (1577–1648)", in Schweizerische Landwirtschaftliche Monatshefte, 39, 1961, 335–341
- G. Herzog, "Daniel Rhagors Pflantz-Gart aus dem Jahre 1639", in Berns mächtige Zeit, ed. A. Holenstein, 2006, 406–411
