= Counts of Lenzburg =

Noble family in central Europe (11–12th centuries)

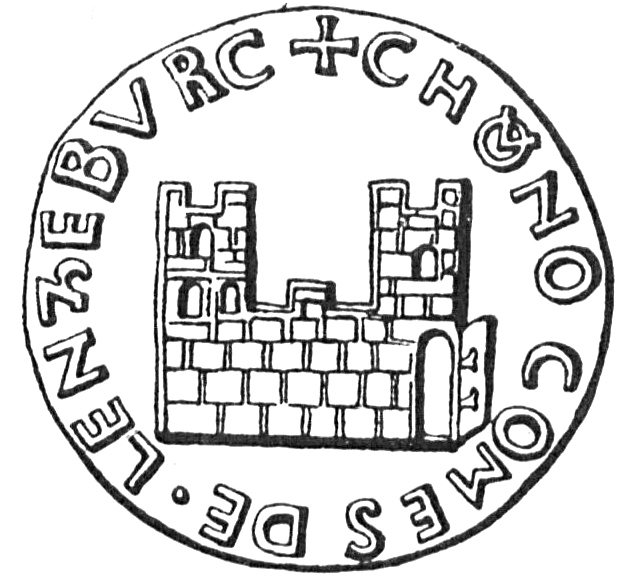
- Country: Aargau, Switzerland
- Founded: 11th century
- Founder: Ulrich I
- Final ruler: Ulrich IV
- Titles: Count
- Deposition: 1173

The Counts of Lenzburg (also Counts of Baden by the early 12th century) were a comital family in the Duchy of Swabia in the 11th and 12th centuries, controlling substantial portions of the pagi (shires) of Aargau and Zürichgau.

After the extinction of their male line in 1173, their lands were distributed between the houses of Kyburg, Zähringen and Hohenstaufen. Subsequent Habsburg expansion into former Lenzburg territories were one of several factors that led to the formation of the Old Swiss Confederacy in the late 13th century.

== History ==
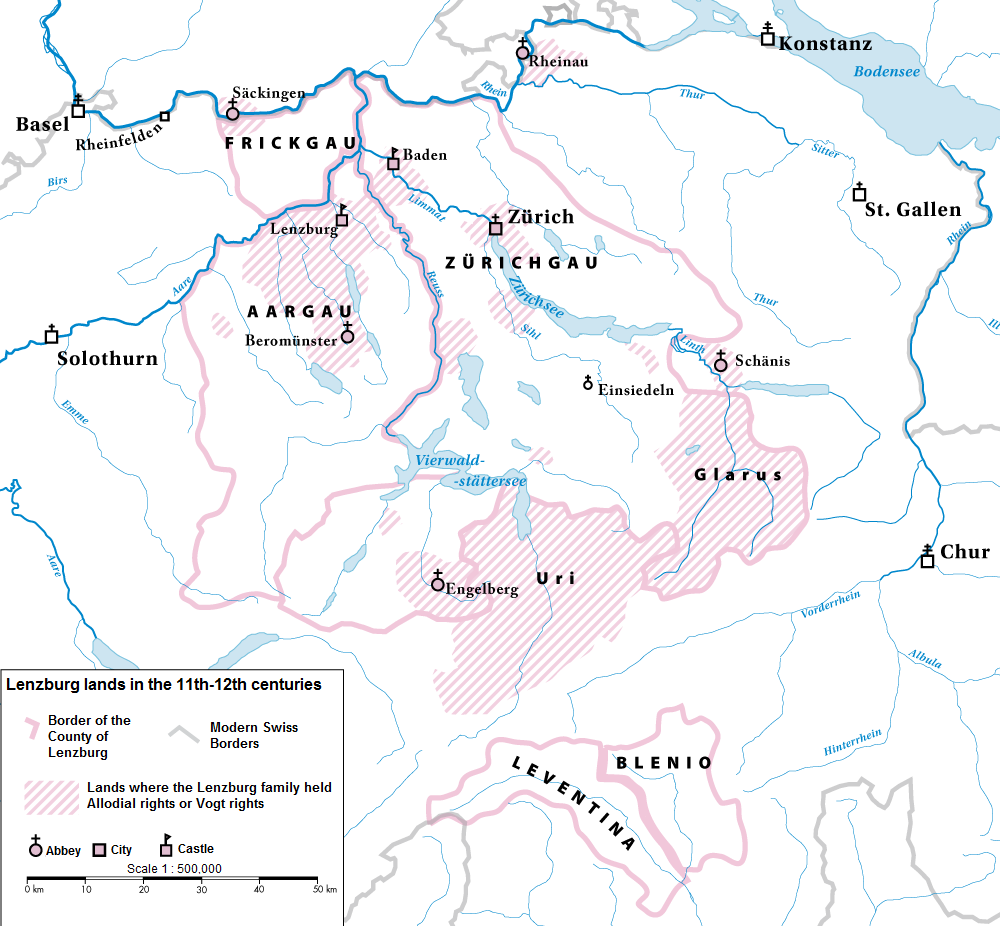
Lenzburg lands during the 11th and 12th centuries

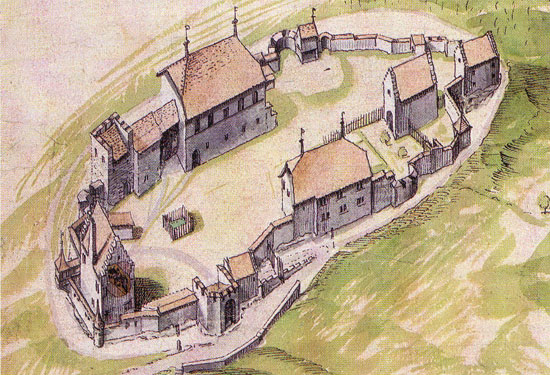
Lenzburg Castle in 1624

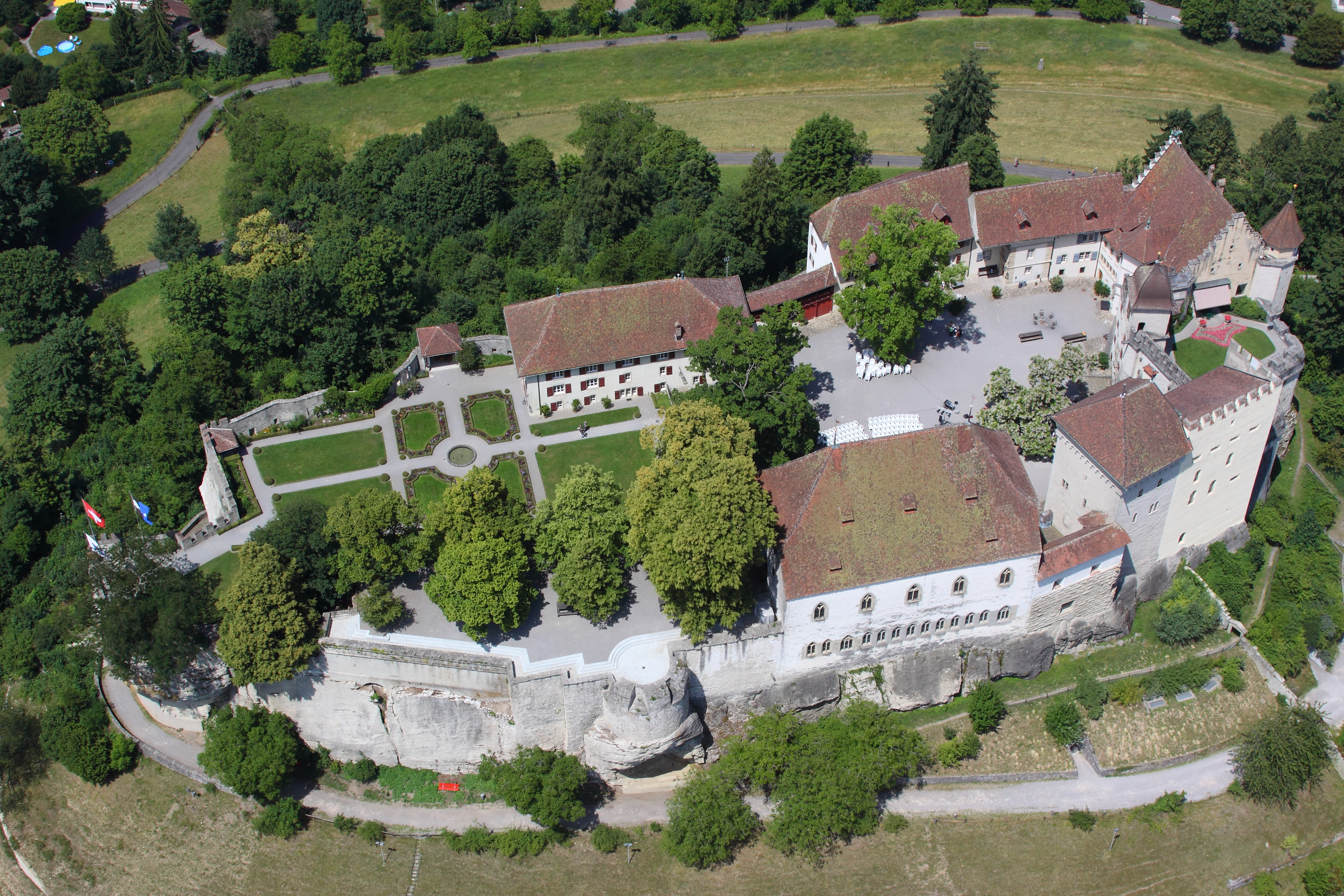
Modern Lenzburg Castle

The Lenzburg family was first mentioned in 1077 in connection with Lenzburg Castle, though they were probably descended from the Carolingian Count Hunfrid of Rhaetia through a female line to the Lords of Schänis, the religious vogt over Schänis Abbey. Through this line, Ulrich (died 972) is usually considered the first member of the Lenzburg family.

The Lenzburgs were related to several other noble houses including the Counts of Habsburg, Steffling in Regensburg and the Kyburgs. The spotty records and intermarriage between the families makes it difficult to determine exactly which family held lands, but Ulrich clearly had land in the Hinterrhein valley and a position as vogt at Schänis Abbey. His son, Arnold, was appointed a vogt in 976 over the two largest monasteries in Zurich, the Grossmünster and Fraumünster, and their lands in Uri.

When Ulrich II supported Emperor Henry IV during the Investiture Controversy he was granted the Zürichgau or lands around Zürich. His brother Arnold I, became Count of the Frickgau in 1064 and vogt over Säckingen Abbey in 1073. When he died childless, those lands and titles came to the main Lenzburg line. Rudolf, the son of Ulrich II, ruled over the County of Aargau and lands in Unterwalden, Uri and Schwyz. In 1125 he became the vogt over Rheinau Abbey. His brother Arnold II held the imperial vogtei of Zurich and the county of Zürichgau.

In the early 12th century the Lenzburg lands were divided. The sons of Arnold II (died 1172) started calling themselves the "Counts of Baden". They held Stein Castle in Baden together with Baldern Castle on the Albis ridge overlooking Zürich, and held the eastern part of the Lenzburg lands. The sons of Rudolf called themselves the Counts of Lenzburg. Rudolf's son Ulrich IV was a close friend of Frederick Barbarossa and after Ulrich's death he bequeathed the Lenzburg lands to Barbarossa. While there were numerous male Lenzburgs, both lines ended when Ulrich IV died.

After the extinction of the Counts of Lenzburg, the Lenzburg lands eventually became part of the Habsburg lands. Expanding from these formerly Lenzburg lands into central Switzerland brought the Habsburgs into conflict with the Forest Cantons in the 13th century and led to the Eternal Alliance of 1291 and the eventual creation of the Old Swiss Confederation.

=== Ulrich I (the rich) ===
The next time a member of the family is mentioned is in 1036 when the son of Arnold, Ulrich I (also known as the rich) had the authority over the collegiate church of Beromünster and a county in Aargau that crossed the Aare River and included lands in central Switzerland. In 1045, he became the religious vogt over Schänis Abbey and restored it to prosperity and a sound economic footing by numerous gifts of property. He established a number of dependent farms and churches that surrounded and supported the Abbey. In the same year he convinced Emperor Henry III to grant Schänis Abbey, Beromünster and his County imperial immediacy. Under Conrad II and Henry III he helped support the plans of the Emperors in what would become Switzerland. His sons Henry, the Bishop of Lausanne 1039–51/56, and Conrad, probably Bishop of Geneva 1020/30, both belonged to the Imperial Episcopate.

=== Henry ===
Henry the son of Ulrich I was first mentioned in 1036 as the dean of Beromünster. He became the Bishop of Lausanne and was sent as the chief ambassador of the Kingdom of Burgundy to the funeral of Emperor Conrad II in 1039. He received the pallium from Pope Leo IX when the Pope traveled through the Diocese of Lausanne in September and October 1050. He died on 16 January 1051 or 1056.

=== Ulrich II ===
Ulrich II was the grandson of Ulrich I (the rich) and nephew of Bishop Henry of Lausanne. He was the Count of Aargau and Frickgau and vogt of Beromünster, Zurich and Säckingen. He married Richenza of Habsburg (died on 27 May in some year around 1100). During the Investiture Controversy, he was a supporter of Emperor Henry IV. In 1077 he arrested the Papal legate Abbot Bernard of Marseilles, who had supported the election of the anti-king Rudolf of Rheinfelden, and fought Rudolf's forces. As a reward, the victorious Emperor, granted him the Zürichgau (lands around Zürich). His death date is unknown, but was after 1077. His sons Ulrich III, Rudolf I and Arnold II followed him as counts and also acquired the vogtei over Rheinau.

=== Ulrich IV ===
Ulrich IV was first mentioned in 1125. He was the son of Rudolf I of Lenzburg and Count of Aargau. Ulrich remained a supporter of the Emperor and in 1136/37 he took part in Emperor Lothar III's Italian campaign. About ten years later in 1147–49, he joined the Second Crusade as a close confidant of King Conrad III. He joined the court of Frederick Barbarossa in 1152 and was permanently at court for ten years. When he died without an heir on 5 January 1173, he bequeathed his lands to Frederick Barbarossa. The Emperor gave some of the lands to Albert III of Habsburg in 1173 and the rest to his son Otto of Burgundy in 1188. Otto added the title Count of Lenzburg to his titles.

== Coat of arms ==
There were several versions of the Lenzburg coat of arms.

The Allgemeine Deutsche Biographie states that it was

eine mit zwei zinnengekrönten Eckthürmen besetzte Mauer; im Eckthurme rechts drei Bogenfenster (1 über 2); im Thurm links ein Bogenfenster; unter demselben in der Mauer eine nach links auswärts geöffnet stehende Bogenthüre. Tinkturen: Blau in Silber. Helmzierde: ein von Silber und Roth (Blau?) gewecktes Kissen.

or

two crenelated towers flanking a wall. The right-hand corner tower had three arched windows (1 over 2); the left one arched window. Below the left corner tower there is a round topped door that opens to the left. Color: silver on a blue field. The helmet is silver with red or blue mantling.

Another version was discovered on a gravestone in Muri in 1674, which had a castle flanked by two crenelated towers, but each tower had only one round topped window and in the center was a round topped door.

== Counts of Lenzburg ==
- Ulrich I, also count of Schannis
- Arnold I (?-after 976)
- Ulrich II the Rich (?-1052/53)
- Arnold II (?-after 1045), ruled in the Lenzburg possessions in Aargau
- Ulrich III (?-after 1077)
- Ulrich IV (1077-1086/1101), ruled in the Lenzburg possessions in Aargau
- Arnold III (1077/1101-1127/30)
- Rudolf I (1130-1136)
- Ulrich V (1130-1133), cited ruling Lenzburg possessions in Baden and Zürichgau
- Arnold IV (1130-1172), cited ruling Lenzburg possessions in Baden and Zürichgau
- Werner (1130-1159), cited ruling Lenzburg possessions in Baden
- Cuno (1130-1168/9), cited ruling Lenzburg possessions in Baden and Zürichgau
- Humbert I (1136-1156)
- Ulrich VI (1136-1173)
- Rudolf II (1136-after 1152)
- Arnold IV (1136-after 1152)

== See also ==
- House of Kyburg
- House of Habsburg
- Lenzburg Castle
