= Stapferhaus =

Museum in Switzerland

Coordinates: 47°23′26″N 8°10′12″E

The Stapferhaus in Lenzburg, Switzerland, was founded in 1960 as a place for encounters and intellectual debate.

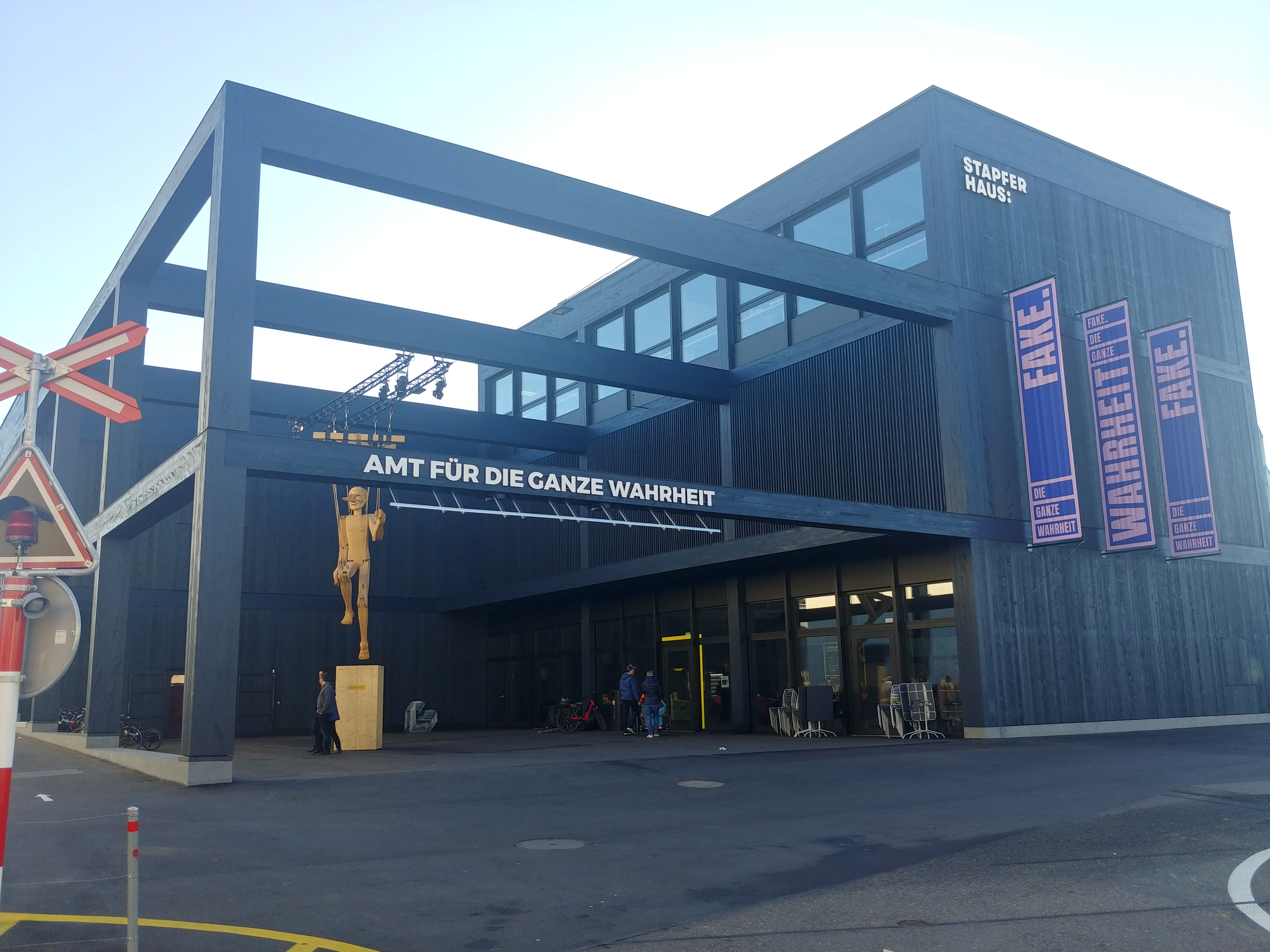
The Stapferhaus

== Founders and founding site ==
The Stapferhaus was founded by the representatives of Pro Helvetia, Pro Argovia, the Canton Aargau and the City of Lenzburg. It was named for Philipp Albert Stapfer (1766–1840), who is considered the founder of the Canton of Aargau. Today Sybille Lichtensteiger is the director of the Stapferhaus. She is responsible for the strategy, setting the themes and the programme. Sybille Lichtensteiger studied History and German studies in Zurich and Berlin and started working at the Stapferhaus 20 years ago.

In 1960 the Stapferhaus was opened in Lenzburg castle and hosted conferences and debates there for about 30 years. In 1994, its first exhibition was Anne Frank and us, done under the direction of Hans Ulrich Garner.

From 2002 to 2018 the Stapferhaus showed its exhibitions at the Zeughaus in Lenzburg, while its offices were still located in Lenzburg castle.

In 2018 the Stapferhaus took up its first permanent home close to Lenzburg railway station, which is now used for both exhibition spaces and offices. The first exhibition in the new building, from 2018 until 2020, was FAKE. And the Office for the Whole Truth. The flexible building is designed to be constantly remodelled, which makes the architecture special. Stairs and walls in the building can be shifted, the floors can be opened, and the façade and forecourt can be changed and re-designed.

== Foundation ==
The Stapferhaus Foundation has operated the Stapferhaus, one of Canton Aargau's eleven cultural flagships, since 2007.

=== Financing ===
The Stapferhaus is financed on a project basis, with financial requirements dependent on the rhythm and size of the respective project. As an institution of national significance, the Stapferhaus is financed by public funds and its own operating income. It also relies on the support of foundations, private partners and sponsors. In recent years the Stapferhaus Foundation has been one of the largest recipients of money from the Lottery Fund.

=== Foundation board ===
The Stapferhaus Foundation board is responsible for the strategic orientation of the cultural institution and securing its funding and determining the management of the institution. The board determines its roles and responsibilities itself, but the Canton of Aargau and the City of Lenzburg have a representative in the board. The canton also appoints the chair of the foundation.

== Mission ==
With its large thematic exhibitions, the Stapferhaus tries to deal with current issues. The goal is for visitors to share their knowledge and experiences and to confront their own perspectives.

== Exhibitions ==
Until mid–May 2022, the Stapferhaus has an exhibition about Gender and Sex.

- 1994: Anne Frank and us
  - Publication: Beat Hächler (ed.): Anne Frank and us. Chronos, Zürich 1995, ISBN 978-3-905311-71-6
- 1997: A walk on the wild side. Jugendszenen der Schweiz von den 30er Jahren bis heute
  - Publication: Barbara Rettenmund (ed.): A walk on the wild side. Jugendszenen der Schweiz von den 30er Jahren bis heute. Chronos, Zurich 1997, ISBN 978-3-905312-03-4
- 1999–2001: Last Minute. Eine Ausstellung zu Sterben und Tod
  - Hans-Ulrich Glarner (ed.): Last minute. Ein Buch zu Sterben und Tod. Hier und Jetzt, Baden 1999, ISBN 978-3-906419-05-3
- 2002: Autolust. Eine Ausstellung über die Emotionen des Autofahrens
  - Publication: Autolust. Ein Buch über Emotionen des Autofahrens. Hier und Jetzt, Baden 2002, ISBN 978-3-906419-29-9
- 2003: SuperAargau
- 2004–2005: Strafen (Punishment)
  - Publication: Nathalie Unternährer (ed.): Strafen. Ein Buch zur Strafkultur der Gegenwart. Hier und Jetzt, Baden 2004, ISBN 978-3-906419-82-4
- 2006–2007: Glaubenssache (Matter of Faith). Eine Ausstellung für Gläubige und Ungläubige
  - Nathalie Unternährer (ed.): Glaubenssache. Ein Buch für Gläubige und Ungläubige. Hier und Jetzt, Baden 2006, ISBN 978-3-03919-038-6
- 2009–2010: Nonstop. Eine Ausstellung über die Geschwindigkeit des Lebens
  - Publication: Nonstop. Ein Lese- und Hörbuch über die Geschwindigkeit des Lebens. Hier und Jetzt, Baden 2009, ISBN 978-3-03919-110-9
- 2010–2011: Home. Willkommen im digitalen Leben
  - Publication: Home – willkommen im digitalen Leben. Hier und Jetzt, Baden 2010, ISBN 978-3-03919-191-8
- 2012–2014: Entscheiden (Decision Making). Über das Leben im Supermarkt der Möglichkeiten
  - Publication: Entscheiden. Das Magazin zur Ausstellung. Stapferhaus, Lenzburg 2014, ISBN 978-3-033-03632-1
- 2014–2016: Geld. Jenseits von Gut und Böse
  - Publication: Michael Fässler (ed.): Geld – jenseits von Gut und Böse. Stapferhaus, Lenzburg 2014.
- 2017–2018: Heimat. Eine Grenzerfahrung
  - Publication: Heimat – eine Grenzerfahrung. NZZ Libro, Zürich 2017, ISBN 978-3-03810-256-4
- 2018–2020: FAKE. And the Office for the Whole Truth
  - Publication: Fake. Das Magazin. Stapferhaus, Lenzburg 2018, ISBN 978-3-907291-17-7
- 2020–2022: Gender and Sex. Discover now
  - Publication: Sibylle Lichtensteiger (ed.). Geschlecht. Jetzt entdecken. NZZ Libro, Basel 2020, ISBN 978-3-907291-17-7

== Awards and nominations ==
=== Awards ===
In 2020 the Stapferhaus won the European Museum of the Year Award for the flexibility of its building and its exhibition work. Due to the COVID-19 pandemic, the awards ceremony had to happen virtually. The museum was acknowledged as a laboratory for the art of living, and its approach was called innovative, creative and future-oriented. The Stapferhaus has won or been nominated for several other awards over the years:

- 2019: Best Architects Award, award in public building
- 2019: European Design Awards (*EDAWARDS), silver award in exhibition design
- 2019: MUSE Design Awards, platinum-award in Interior
- 2020: AIT Award, special mention
- 2020: European Museum Award of the Year, the main award
- 2021: IDA Design Awards, bronze award in the categories Zines/Flyers and Print/Editorial for FAKE. Das Magazin
- 2021: Award with the Swiss LGBTI-Label
- 2021: Award for Marketing and Architecture, category audience construction, sports complex, hospitals, train stations, school buildings, cultural constructions.
- 2021: Swiss Print Award, silver in the category Publications for the book Gender
- 2021: Prix Lignum, recognition award
- 2021: Best in Heritage, Projects of Influence, third place

=== Nominations ===
- 2018: Hochparterre Die Besten
- 2019: Archmarathon – Worldwide Architecture Award
- 2019: Archmarathon – Worldwide Architecture Award, nominated in Arts & Culture
- 2020/2021: Dasa Award, European Academy Nomination, among the last three institutions
