= Baldern Castle =

Castle in Zürich, Switzerland

- Stallikon, Canton Zürich

Site information
- Type: Exact type unclear
- Code: CH-ZH
- Condition: burgstall (no above-ground ruins)

Location
- Coordinates: 47°18′52.93″N 08°30′20.78″E
- Height: 810 m above the sea

Site history
- Built: Possibly about 853AD

Baldern Castle (German: Burg Baldern or Burgstelle Baldern) is a former castle in the municipality of Stallikon and the canton of Zürich in Switzerland. The remains of the castle comprise a set of earthworks, situated on the Albis ridge at some 810 metres (2,660 ft) above sea level and about 4 kilometres (2.5 mi) south of the summit of Uetliberg. The earthworks are obscured by the site's woodland nature.

A legend recorded ca. 1510 suggests that the castle was built by Ludwig the German, the first king of East Francia, in the 9th century, but there is no strong evidence for this. The castle is known to have been owned by the Counts of Lenzburg in the 12th century. There have been no significant archeological investigations of the site, and the date and reason it was abandoned is unknown.

The site of the castle lies about 500 metres (1,600 ft) walk north of the upper station of the Adliswil-Felsenegg cable car at Felsenegg. The panoramic footpath from Uetliberg to Felsenegg passes through the old castle site.

== Gallery ==
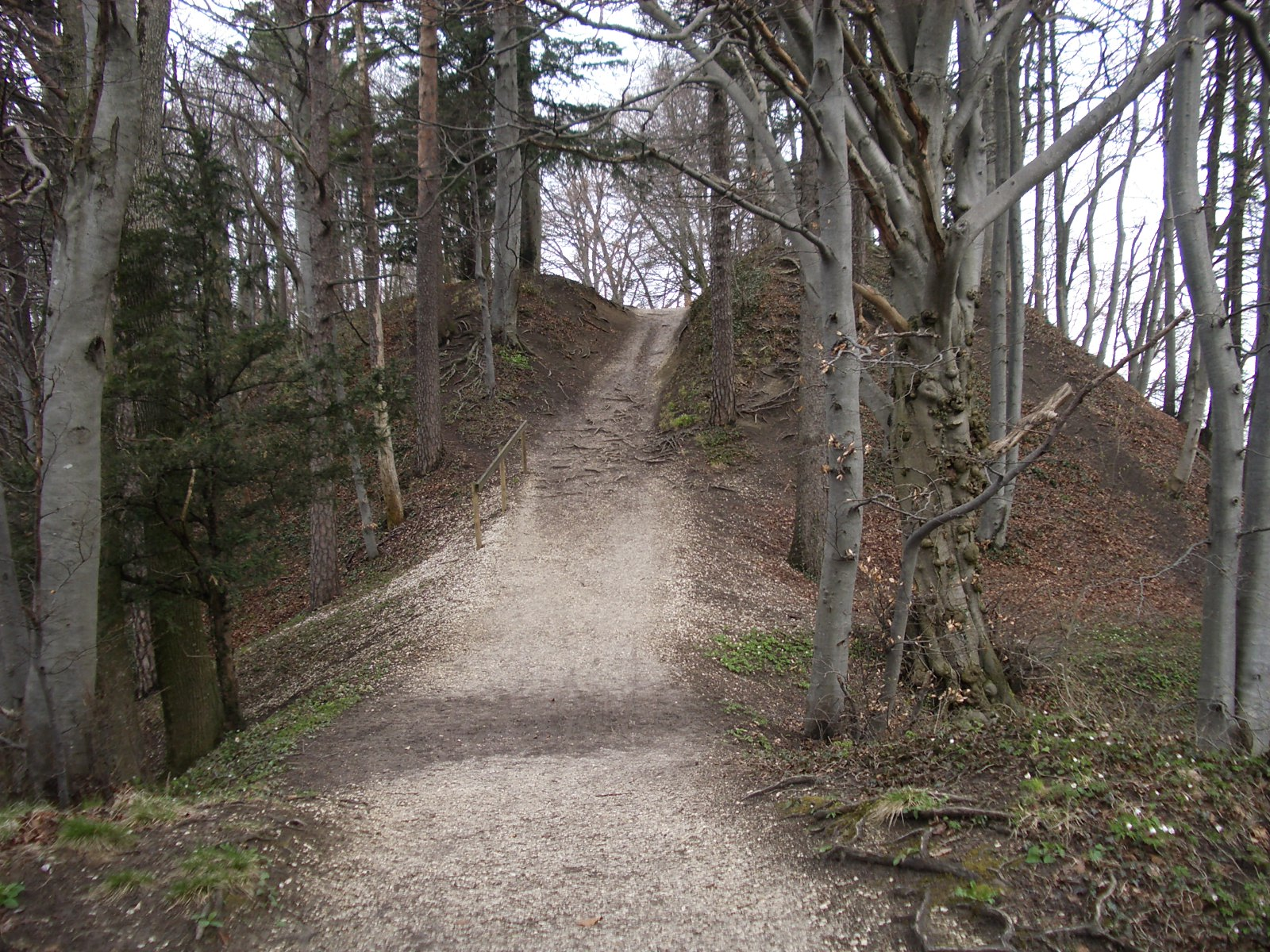
The approach to the castle from the south

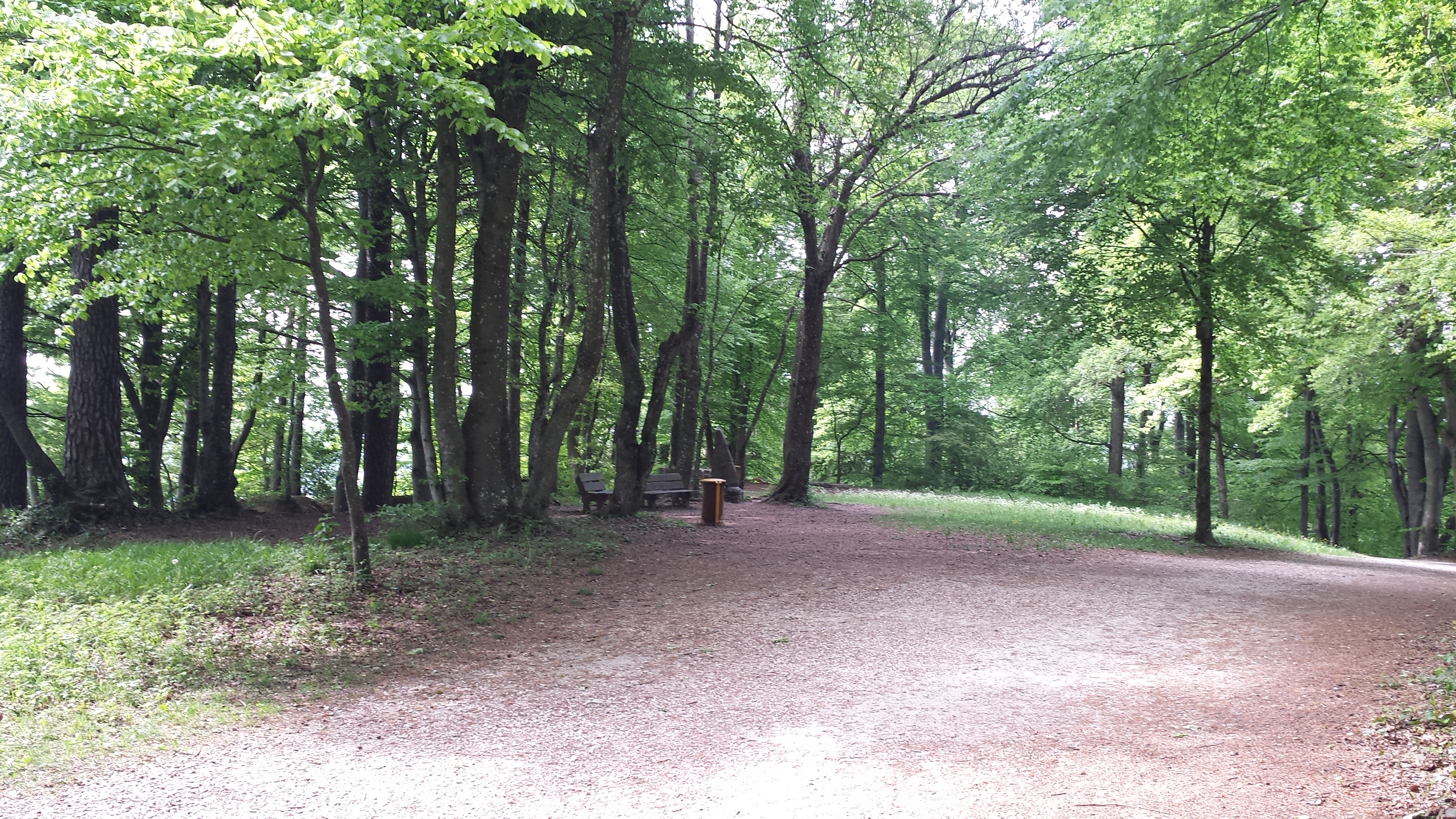
The interior of the castle site

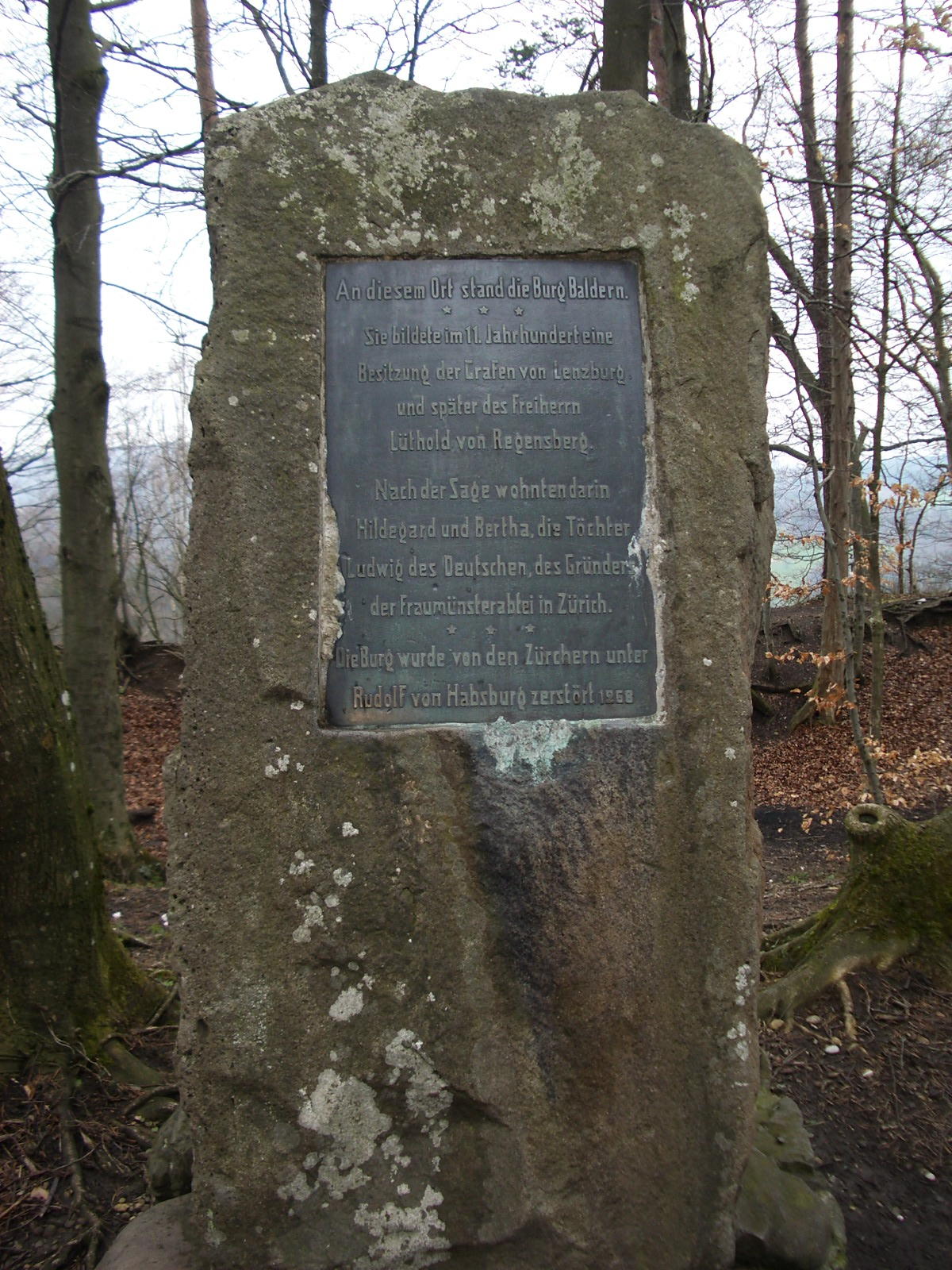
Plaque marking site

== See also ==
- List of castles in Switzerland
