= Albrecht Friedrich Stettler =

Swiss jurist and politician (1796–1849)

- Born: Bern
- Baptised: 28 April 1796
- Died: 15 February 1849; Bern, Switzerland
- Occupations: Jurist; politician
- Spouses: Marie Emilie Stettler; Margarethe von Graffenried
- Father: Albrecht Friedrich Stettler
- Relatives: Eduard Stettler (brother)

Albrecht Friedrich Stettler (baptized 28 April 1796 – 15 February 1849) was a Swiss jurist and politician from Bern. He was an associate professor of constitutional and financial law at the University of Bern and was considered the most liberal Bernese patrician.

== Early life ==
Albrecht Friedrich Stettler was a member of the Stettler family. He was the son of Albrecht Friedrich Stettler, a jurist and professor of history, and the brother of Eduard Stettler. He married first Marie Emilie Stettler and then Margarethe von Graffenried.

== Career ==
He studied law in Bern, Heidelberg, and Göttingen, and became secretary of the council of justice (Justizratsschreiber). In 1834 he became a Privatdozent at the University of Bern, and in 1844 an associate professor (ausserordentlicher Professor) of constitutional and financial law; in the same year he was rector of the university.

From 1826 to 1846 Stettler was a member of the Grand Council of Bern. In 1831 he was prefect (Regierungsstatthalter) in Interlaken, in 1834 he became commissioner for fiefs (Lehenskommissär), and from 1836 to 1838 he was an envoy to the Federal Diet (Tagsatzung). He was considered the most liberal Bernese patrician. As an opponent of the Sonderbund War, he was dismissed by the radical government in 1848.

== Works ==
- Staats- und Rechtsgeschichte des Kantons Bern, 1845

== Bibliography ==
- E. Gruner, Das bernische Patriziat und die Regeneration, 1943
- H. von Greyerz, Nation und Geschichte im bernischen Denken, 1953
- Die Dozenten der bernischen Hochschule, 1984
