= Anton Stettler =

Swiss translator and bailiff (1587–1648)

- Baptised: 7 December 1587; Seedorf, Switzerland
- Died: 1648; Genoa
- Occupations: Official; translator
- Spouse: Susanna Ragor (m. 1616)
- Relatives: Michael Stettler (brother)

Anton Stettler (baptized 7 December 1587 – 1648) was a Bernese official and translator. He was a member of the Grand Council of Bern and bailiff of Avenches and Grandson, and he translated the 126 Quatrains of Guy du Faur de Pibrac into German.

== Biography ==
Anton Stettler was a member of the Stettler family. He was the son of Hieronymus, a tanner and member of the Small Council, and Anna Grätz, and the brother of the chronicler Michael Stettler. In 1616 he married Susanna Ragor, daughter of Daniel Ragor.

From 1619 Stettler was a member of the Grand Council of Bern. He was clerk of the consistory (Chorgerichtsschreiber) from 1619 to 1627, bailiff (Landvogt) of Avenches from 1627 to 1633, and bailiff of Grandson from 1638 to 1640.

At the suggestion of Wilhelm Fabry, Stettler translated into German the 126 Quatrains of the Catholic nobleman Guy du Faur de Pibrac. These moral rules in the form of quatrains were widely circulated until the middle of the 17th century, including in Reformed areas. Stettler's work was printed in Bern in 1642, together with his translations of sonnets by the same author, of a moral poem by Pierre de Ronsard, and of a hymn in praise of peace by Guillaume de Salluste du Bartas. Stettler died in Genoa in 1648.

== Bibliography ==
- R. d'Anacker, Les traductions d'Antoine Stettler, 1927
