= Wilhelm Stettler =

Swiss painter (1643–1708)

- Baptised: 12 March 1643; Bern, Switzerland
- Died: before 9 February 1708; Bern, Switzerland
- Occupations: Painter; draftsman
- Spouse: Anna Rosina Wagner (m. 1677)
- Relatives: Michael Stettler (grandfather)

Wilhelm Stettler (baptized 12 March 1643 – before 9 February 1708) was a Bernese painter and draftsman. He drew and painted the family trees of several Bernese families and drew several thousand medals for the physician and numismatist Charles Patin.

== Biography ==
Wilhelm Stettler was a member of the Stettler family. He was the son of Samuel, a clerk of the consistory (Chorschreiber), and a grandson of the chronicler Michael Stettler. In 1677 he married Anna Rosina Wagner.

Zu Bern beim Spitz, around 1680 (Burgerbibliothek Bern)

Stettler went to school in Geneva and turned to art. After returning to Bern he took drawing lessons from Joseph Werner and Jakob Wäber, and then learned etching from Conrad Meyer in Zurich. After a journey to Versailles, he drew and painted the family trees of several Bernese families (Berner Wappenbuch, 1684). He made drawings after medals and books by Andreas Morell, illustrated the deeds of Alexander the Great and Albrecht Herbort's Kurtze ostindianische Reiss-Beschreibung, and then drew several thousand medals for Charles Patin.

From 1680 to 1695 Stettler was a member of the Grand Council of the city of Bern. In 1703 St. Urban Abbey paid him for designs for stained-glass panels (Scheibenrisse). He gave 350 books and his collection of prints to the city library of Bern (Stadtbibliothek). His work consists mainly of small-format wash drawings, an album of views (Vedutenalbum) of towns and landscapes, and illustrations of Aesop's fables. In 1679 he wrote a treatise giving instruction in perspective painting and in copying.

== Bibliography ==
- O. Bätschmann, "Gelehrte Maler in Bern", in Im Schatten des Goldenen Zeitalters, 2, 1995, 165–200
- Biografisches Lexikon der Schweizer Kunst, 1998, 1005
- H. Thomke, "Die Bibliothek Wilhelm Stettlers", in Berns mächtige Zeit, ed. A. Holenstein, 2006, 309
