= Eduard Stettler (architect) =

Swiss architect (1803–1879)

- Born: 17 February 1803; Bern, Switzerland
- Died: 7 May 1879 (aged 76); Köniz, Switzerland
- Education: École des Beaux-Arts
- Occupation: Architect
- Spouses: Adelheid von Büren (m. 1837) Catharina von Ougspurger (m. 1857)
- Children: Eugen Stettler
- Buildings: Hotel Schweizerhof; Houses on the Nydeggasse, Bern

Eduard Stettler (17 February 1803 – 7 May 1879) was a Swiss architect. Especially in the 1830s and 1840s, his new buildings shaped the townscape of Bern.

== Biography ==
Eduard Stettler was a member of the Stettler family. He was the son of Albrecht Friedrich Stettler, a professor of law, and the brother of Albrecht Friedrich Stettler. In 1837, he married Adelheid von Büren, and in 1857, Catharina von Ougspurger. His son was the architect Eugen Stettler.

He studied architecture at the École des Beaux-Arts in Paris, in Munich, and in Rome.

Stettler was imprisoned for taking part in the patrician opposition to Bern's new liberal government in 1832. He later served on the Burgerrat, the council of the burgher community (Burgergemeinde), and from 1850 to 1860 on the municipal council (Gemeinderat) of Bern.

Stettler was a member of the Swiss Society of Engineers and Architects and its president in 1850. In 1872, he was one of the founders of the Kirchenfeld building company (Kirchenfeld-Baugesellschaft), which initiated the construction of the Kirchenfeld Bridge and the development of the Kirchenfeld district.

Especially in the 1830s and 1840s, Stettler shaped the townscape of Bern with new buildings. He was responsible for the Hotel Schweizerhof, houses on the Nydeggasse, and guild halls (Zunft- und Gesellschaftshäuser).

From 1858, he was the owner of the Stettlergut estate in Köniz.

== Bibliography ==
- Architektenlexikon der Schweiz 19./20. Jahrhundert, 1998, 516
