= Stettler family =

Patrician family of Bern, Switzerland

The Stettler family is a patrician family of Bern that still existed at the beginning of the 21st century. Its first proven ancestor is Wilhelm, who entered the Grand Council of Bern in 1541. In 1716 Emperor Charles VI raised the family to the rank of imperial knights. In the 19th and 20th centuries it produced a dynasty of architects.

== History ==
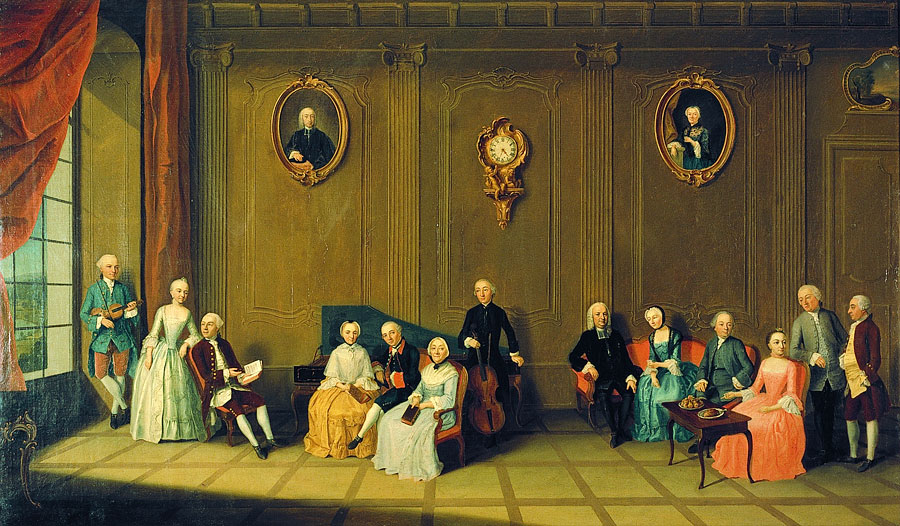
The family of Johann Rudolf Stettler (1696–1757), painted by Johann Ludwig Aberli around 1755

The family has membership rights (Stubenrecht) in the tanners' guild, the Gesellschaft zu Ober-Gerwern. It has no genealogical connection to the earlier von Stettlen family. Various bearers of the name Stettler are mentioned as members of the council of Bern from 1325, but only Wilhelm, who entered the Grand Council of Bern in 1541, can be proven to be the family's progenitor. Although the Stettlers, thanks to their many branches, steadily increased their presence in the Grand Council, they remained rooted in the crafts until the 17th century, first as tanners and later also as glaziers, among other trades.

Gradually, with Anton and the chronicler Michael, the Stettlers became established in important posts as clerks (Schreiber). The painter Wilhelm came from this milieu. Four members of the Grand Council entered the Small Council, where Johann Rudolf (1696–1757) rose to the office of Venner (banneret) and his son Rudolf to that of treasurer of the German lands (Deutschseckelmeister). Karl Ludwig, who withdrew from politics in 1831, made his name as a historian, while Albrecht Friedrich was regarded as the most liberal Bernese patrician. From about 1700 the Stettlers were also active in mercenary service, in which Rudolf rose to the rank of brigadier. In 1716 Emperor Charles VI raised the family to the rank of imperial knights (Reichsritterstand).

With the withdrawal from politics and the end of foreign military service, many sons of the family took up academic careers in the 19th and 20th centuries. Besides lawyers, engineers, physicians and, continuing a tradition of the Ancien Régime, several pastors, the Stettlers produced a dynasty of architects, among them Eduard, his son Eugen, and Eugen's grandson Michael; the artist Martha also came from this dynasty. Emanuel pursued a military career up to the rank of Divisionär (major general). At the beginning of the 21st century several members of the family lived in England and the United States.

== Bibliography ==
- Schweizerisches Geschlechterbuch, 1, 1905, 579–588; 4, 1913, 518–530
- B. von Rodt, Genealogien burgerlicher Geschlechter der Stadt Bern, 5, 124–162 (manuscript, 1950, Burgerbibliothek Bern)

=== Archives ===
- Family archives, Burgerbibliothek Bern
