= Emanuel Stettler =

Swiss army officer (1925–2026)

- Born: 23 November 1925
- Died: 12 March 2026 (aged 100); Kirchdorf, Switzerland
- Education: University of Bern
- Spouse: Ruth Elisabeth Häberlin
- Military career
- Allegiance: Switzerland
- Branch: Swiss Army
- Rank: Divisionär

Emanuel Stettler (23 November 1925 – 12 March 2026) was a Swiss army officer who reached the rank of divisional commander (Divisionär). He was director of the Federal Office of Air Raid Protection Troops from 1976 to 1982 and of the Federal Office of the Adjutancy from 1982 to 1987.

== Biography ==
Emanuel Stettler was a member of the Stettler family. He was the son of Werner Stettler, an engineer trained at ETH Zurich and director of the Société de la Viscose Suisse. He married Ruth Elisabeth Häberlin, daughter of Heinrich Häberlin, a bank director. He studied law at the University of Bern from 1946 to 1952 and became an attorney in 1952.

From 1955 Stettler was an artillery instructor officer, and from 1959 a general staff officer. In 1974 he became a brigadier and chief of staff of Mountain Army Corps 3, a post he held until 1975. From 1976 to 1982 he was director of the Federal Office of Air Raid Protection Troops (Bundesamt für Luftschutztruppen). In 1982 he became a divisional commander, and from 1982 to 1987 he headed the Federal Office of the Adjutancy (Bundesamt für Adjutantur).

== Bibliography ==
- Der Schweizerische Generalstab (L'Etat-major général suisse), 9, 448
