= Karl Ludwig Stettler =

Swiss politician and historian

- Born: 7 November 1773; Bern
- Died: 27 February 1858 (aged 84); Köniz, Switzerland
- Occupations: Politician; historian
- Spouse: Rosa Jütz (m. 1804)
- Parents: Karl Ludwig Stettler (father); Sophie von Graffenried (mother)

Karl Ludwig Stettler (7 November 1773 – 27 February 1858) was a Swiss politician and historian from Bern. During the Regeneration he opposed the liberal constitutional state in publications, and in 1833 he fled to Schwyz.

== Biography ==
Karl Ludwig Stettler was a member of the Stettler family. He was the son of Karl Ludwig Stettler, a bailiff (Landvogt) and colonel, and Sophie von Graffenried. In 1804 he married Rosa Jütz, daughter of Josef Leonz Karl, an envoy (Ehrengesandter) to Bern.

In 1799, in the lead-up to the First Battle of Zurich, Stettler had to take the field as a captain in the army of the Helvetic Republic. In 1802, again as a captain and as an opponent of the Helvetic government, he took part in the Stecklikrieg. In 1814 he entered Bernese politics as a member of the Grand Council. He was district governor (Oberamtmann) of Trachselwald from 1815 to 1821 and a judge of the court of appeal from 1829 to 1831. He withdrew from politics in 1831.

During the Regeneration he opposed the liberal constitutional state in publications. In 1833 he fled to Schwyz, where several Bernese patricians who had been banished or had fled because of press offenses, among them Bernhard Friedrich von Wattenwyl, formed an anti-liberal rallying point.

Stettler made a name for himself as a historian with his treatise Adrian von Bubenberg [...] (1828) and with his unpublished multi-volume works Geschichte und Genealogie der wichtigsten edlen Berner Geschlechter (History and genealogy of the most important noble Bernese families) and Historische Topographie des Kantons Bern (Historical topography of the canton of Bern).

== Bibliography ==
- Neues Berner Taschenbuch, 1910, 198–277
- E. Gruner, Das bernische Patriziat und die Regeneration, 1943
- H. Sawerschel, Karl Ludwig Stettler von Köniz, 2007

=== Archives ===
- Burgerbibliothek Bern
