= Eugen Stettler =

Swiss architect (1840–1913)

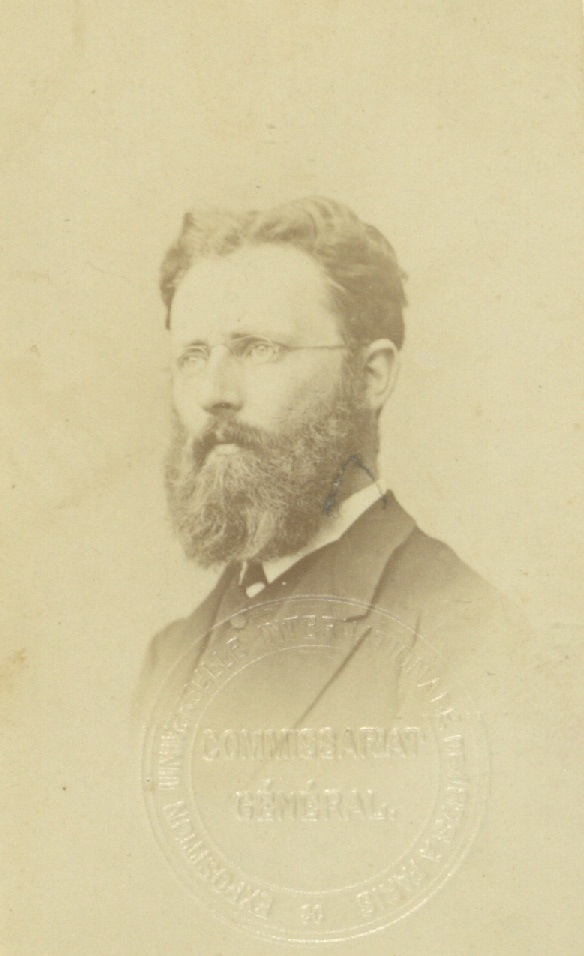
- Born: 17 June 1840; Bern, Switzerland
- Died: 13 February 1913 (aged 72); Bern, Switzerland
- Education: École des Beaux-Arts
- Occupation: Architect
- Spouse: Clara von Fischer
- Children: Martha Stettler
- Parents: Eduard Stettler (father); Adelheid von Büren (mother)
- Buildings: Museum of Fine Arts Bern; Municipal gymnasium, Bern

Eugen Stettler (17 June 1840 – 13 February 1913) was a Swiss architect. He was city building inspector (Stadtbauinspektor) of Bern from 1867 to 1876, and his works include the Museum of Fine Arts Bern.

== Biography ==
Eugen Stettler was a member of the Stettler family. He was the son of Eduard Stettler and Adelheid née von Büren. He married Clara von Fischer. His daughter was the painter Martha Stettler. His grandson was Michael Stettler.

Stettler trained as an architect at the École des Beaux-Arts in Paris, where he received distinctions. From 1863 to 1866 he worked for the French architect Charles Garnier in Paris. From 1867 to 1876 he was city building inspector in Bern; until 1882 he was also master builder of Bern Minster (Münsterbaumeister), and from 1887 he was a member of the Kirchenfeld building company (Kirchenfeld-Baugesellschaft). He served on the juries of national and international competitions, and in 1878 at the World's Fair in Paris.

Stettler built several school buildings and other public buildings, as well as numerous villas in and around Bern. His works include the Museum of Fine Arts, the municipal gymnasium (städtisches Gymnasium), and numerous sophisticated residential buildings in the newly developed Kirchenfeld district. He was also known as a draftsman and watercolorist.

== Bibliography ==
- Architektenlexikon der Schweiz 19./20. Jahrhundert, 1998, 516–517
