= Rudolf Stettler (politician) =

Swiss politician (1731–1825)

- Baptised: 22 April 1731; Schinznach, Switzerland
- Died: 2 December 1825 (aged 94); Bern, Switzerland
- Title: Deutschseckelmeister of Bern
- Term: 1794–1798
- Spouse: Henriette Herport

Rudolf Stettler (baptized 22 April 1731 – 2 December 1825) was a Bernese politician. He was a member of the Small Council of Bern, treasurer of the German lands (Deutschseckelmeister) from 1794 to 1798, and an envoy to the Federal Diet in 1792 and 1794.

== Biography ==
Rudolf Stettler was a member of the Stettler family. He was the son of Johann Rudolf, a councillor, bailiff (Landvogt) of Saanen, and Venner (banneret). He married Henriette Herport.

In 1754 Stettler became secretary of the commissions (Kommissionsschreiber), in 1760 a member of the Grand Council of Bern, and in 1768 Rathausammann (an official of the town hall). From 1771 to 1777 he was bailiff of Frienisberg. In 1786 he became a member of the Small Council, in 1788 inspector of churches (Kirchmeier), and from 1794 to 1798 he was treasurer of the German lands. In 1792 and 1794 he was an envoy to the Federal Diet (Tagsatzung). From 1803 to 1824 he was again a member of the Small Council. He owned a country estate at Kirchberg.

== Bibliography ==
- R. Feller, Geschichte Berns, 4, 1960
