= Martha Stettler =

Swiss artist (1870–1945)

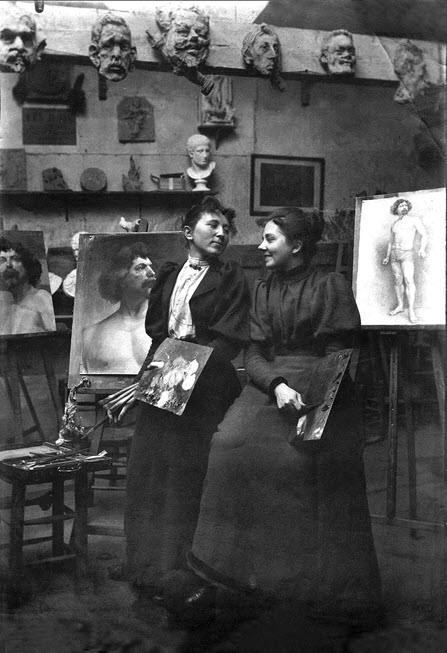
- Alice Dannenberg (left) and Martha Stettler (right), 1894
- Born: 25 September 1870; Bern, Switzerland
- Died: 16 December 1945 (aged 75); Châtillon, Hauts-de-Seine, France
- Occupations: Painter, engraver
- Known for: Co-founder and director of the Académie de la Grande Chaumière

Adelheid Fanny Martha Stettler (25 September 1870 – 16 December 1945) was a Swiss painter and engraver. She was one of the founders of the Académie de la Grande Chaumière, and was co-principal of the school from 1909 until 1945.

== Biography ==
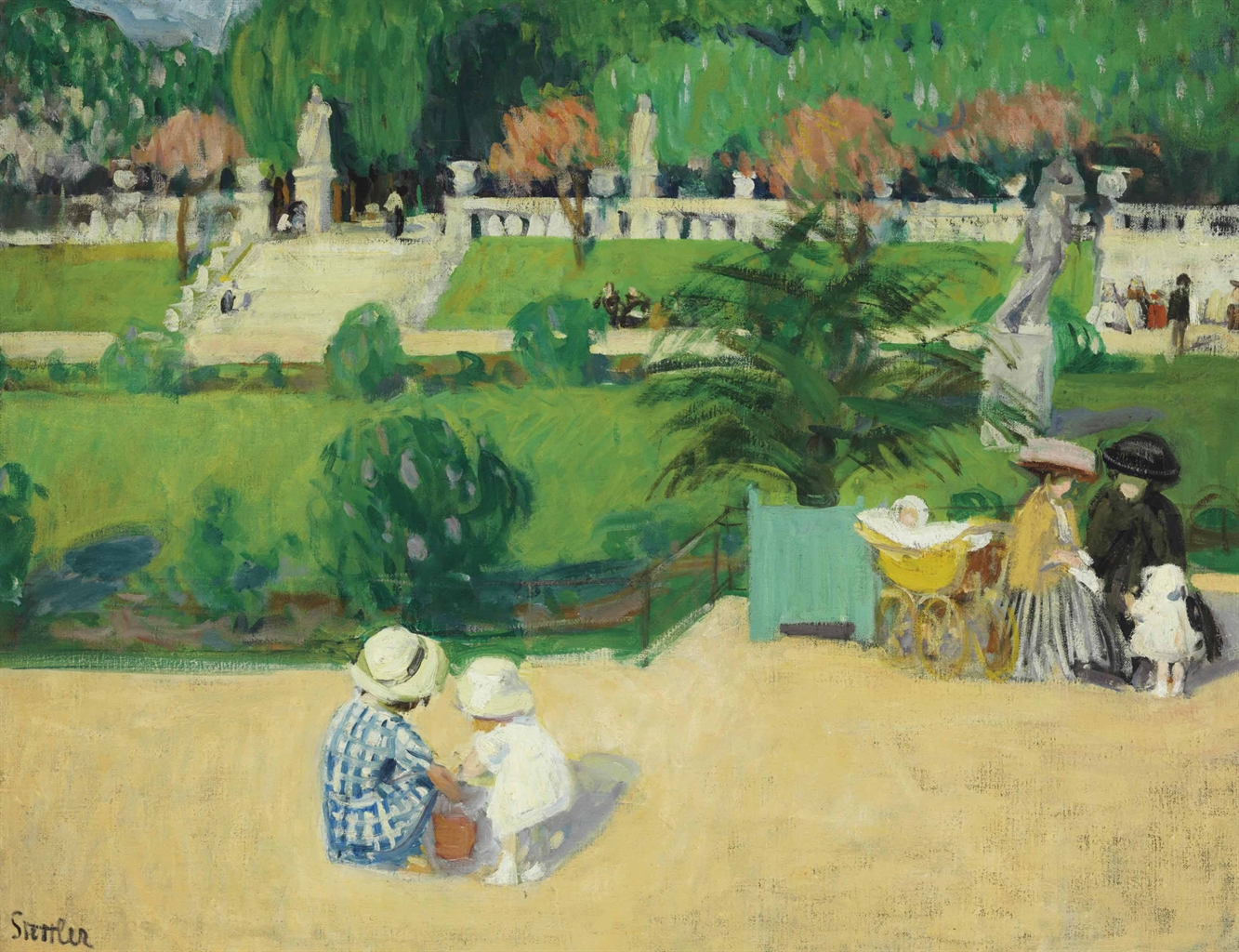
Dans le Jardin du Luxembourg by Martha Stettler

Martha Stettler was born in Bern. Her father, Eugen Stettler, was an architect who gave her early instruction in drawing. In 1893, after studying art in Bern and Geneva, she went to Paris, where she attended the Académie Julian. She studied with Luc-Olivier Merson from 1893 to 1898 and became a student of Lucien Simon in 1899. The Académie de la Grande Chaumière, of which Stettler was a co-founder, had its origin in a group of art students. Simon, Antoine Bourdelle, and Émile-René Ménard were among the school's early instructors. Stettler and her partner and fellow artist Alice Dannenberg were the directors of the school from 1909 to 1945.

Stettler began participating in the Paris Salon in 1897 and exhibited at the Salon des Indépendants, the Salon des Tuileries, and the salon of the Société Nationale des Beaux-Arts, of which she became an associate member in 1912. She won a medal for work exhibited at the 1910 Exposition universelle in Brussels and contributed a painting to the Swiss pavilion at the 1920 Venice Biennale.

Stettler's subjects included many outdoor scenes of children playing in the Jardin du Luxembourg and the Tuileries Garden, as well as interiors, still lifes, landscapes, portraits and animal studies. After 1920, when she moved to the Parisian suburb of Fontenay-aux-Roses, her artistic output declined. Stettler died on 16 December 1945 at Châtillon, Hauts-de-Seine, near Paris. In 1946 the Kunsthalle Bern held a memorial exhibition of her work. Stettler's works are held by the Kunstmuseum Winterthur, the Museum of Fine Arts Bern, the Musée d'Art et d'Histoire in Geneva, the Musée du Luxembourg in Paris, and the Galleria Nazionale d'Arte Moderna in Rome.
