= Michael Stettler (chronicler) =

Swiss chronicler (1580–1642)

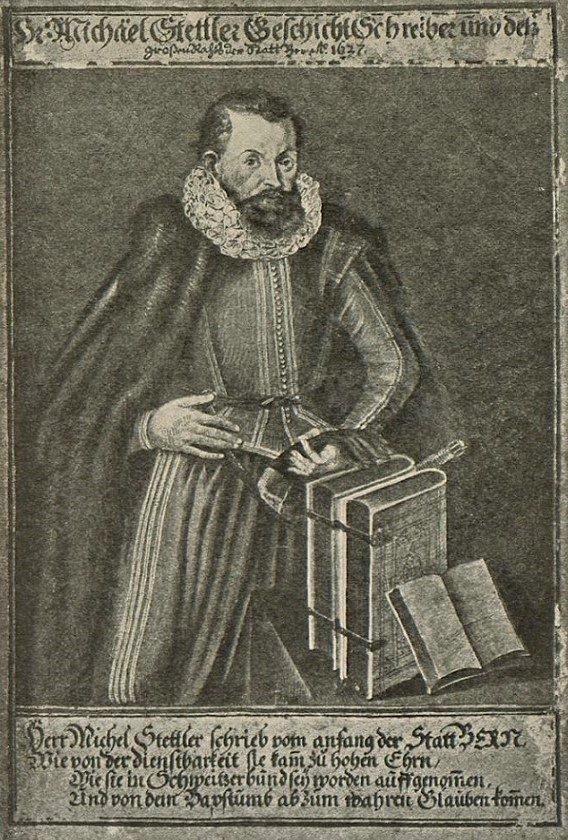
- Portrait, 1627
- Born: 1580; Bern, Switzerland
- Died: 1642 (aged 61–62); Bern, Switzerland
- Occupations: Chronicler; official
- Spouses: Maria Guldi (m. 1601) Judith Ramuz (m. 1604) Margaretha von Büren (m. 1632)
- Relatives: Anton Stettler (brother); Wilhelm Stettler (grandson)

Michael Stettler (1580–1642) was a Bernese chronicler and official. After writing a history of Bern in several volumes, he published a two-volume history in 1626, which appeared in 1631, expanded and censored by the authorities, as the Schweitzer-Chronic.

== Biography ==
Michael Stettler was a member of the Stettler family. He was the son of Hieronymus, a tanner and member of the Small Council, and Anna Grätz, and the brother of Anton Stettler. He married Maria Guldi in 1601, Judith Ramuz in 1604, and Margaretha von Büren in 1632. His grandson was the painter Wilhelm Stettler.

Stettler trained as a notary in Geneva or Lausanne. In 1605 he became clerk of the consistory and marriage court (Chor- und Ehegerichtsschreiber) in Bern, in 1606 a member of the Grand Council, and in 1610 secretary of the treasury of the German lands (Deutschseckelschreiber). He was bailiff (Landvogt) of Oron from 1616 to 1622 and of St. Johannsen from 1627 to 1629, and from 1629 to 1642 chief commissioner of fiefs (Oberlehenskommissär) for the welsche Lande, the French-speaking territories.

Frontispiece of the first volume of Stettler's chronicle of Bern, 1623 (Staatsarchiv Bern)

As a young man, Stettler wrote, without great talent, poems of praise and, among other works, a drama in 33 acts (Vom Ursprung löblicher Eidsgenossenschaft, 1605). He then turned to historiography and gathered material by copying records and, above all, the works of earlier Bernese chroniclers that had not yet been printed. In 1614 he presented the council with a three-volume history of the city covering the years 1526 to 1610, which he revised and expanded into a work of ten volumes. At the request of the burghers, a two-volume history was published in 1626; expanded by an appendix and censored by the authorities, it appeared in 1631 under the title Schweitzer-Chronic.

The work is characterized by a strong belief in the "all-governing God", who directs every event and passes judgment in this world and the next. For Stettler, the miracle of the emergence, strengthening, and expansion of the small Confederacy in the midst of hostile potentates was unthinkable without God's special protection. He attached great value to history, because from it those who govern could derive rules of conduct for the present and guidance for the future. In Stettler's view, aristocracy represented the golden mean between monarchy and democracy. His interest lay in the state, and he mentioned cultural history only occasionally. Stettler's chronicle had a long afterlife.

== Bibliography ==
- Sammlung bernischer Biographien, 2, 1896, 49–58
- H. von Greyerz, Nation und Geschichte im bernischen Denken, 1953, 57–61
- R. Feller, E. Bonjour, Geschichtsschreibung der Schweiz vom Spätmittelalter zur Neuzeit, 1, 2nd edition, 1979, 356–359
- U. M. Zahnd, "'Wir sind willens ein kronick beschriben ze lassen'", in Berner Zeitschrift für Geschichte und Heimatkunde, 67, 2005, 37–61
