= Rudolf Stettler (soldier) =

Swiss brigadier (1746–1809)

- Born: 28 June 1746; Bern, Switzerland
- Died: 15 March 1809 (aged 62); Bern, Switzerland
- Spouse: Sophie von Tavel (m. 1785)
- Military career
- Allegiance: Kingdom of Sardinia; Republic of Bern
- Rank: Brigadier
- Commands: His own regiment in Sardinian service (1794); Auszügerbataillon Burgdorf (1798)

Rudolf Stettler (28 June 1746 – 15 March 1809) was a Bernese officer who became a brigadier in the service of Sardinia-Piedmont. In 1798 he commanded the elite battalion of Burgdorf against the French.

== Biography ==
Rudolf Stettler was a member of the Stettler family. He was the son of Johann Karl, a salt director (Salzdirektor), and Elisabeth Morlot, and a grandson of Franz Ludwig Morlot. In 1785 he married Sophie von Tavel, daughter of Daniel Ludwig, a bailiff (Landvogt).

In Sardinian-Piedmontese service, Stettler became colonel of his own regiment in 1794 and a brigadier in 1796. During the defense of the town of Mondovì in Piedmont, he was taken prisoner by Bonaparte's troops, but he was soon released to Bern. In 1798 he commanded the elite battalion (Auszügerbataillon) of Burgdorf on the western front against the French. After 1798 he lived on his estate, Wyler, near Bern.

== Bibliography ==
- R. de Steiger, Les généraux bernois, 1864, 58

=== Archives ===
- Schafroth collection, Bibliothek am Guisanplatz, Bern
