= Schänis Abbey =

Coordinates: 47.159873°N 9.045081°E

Imperial Abbey of Schänis Reichskloster Schänis
- 1045–1803
- Coat of arms

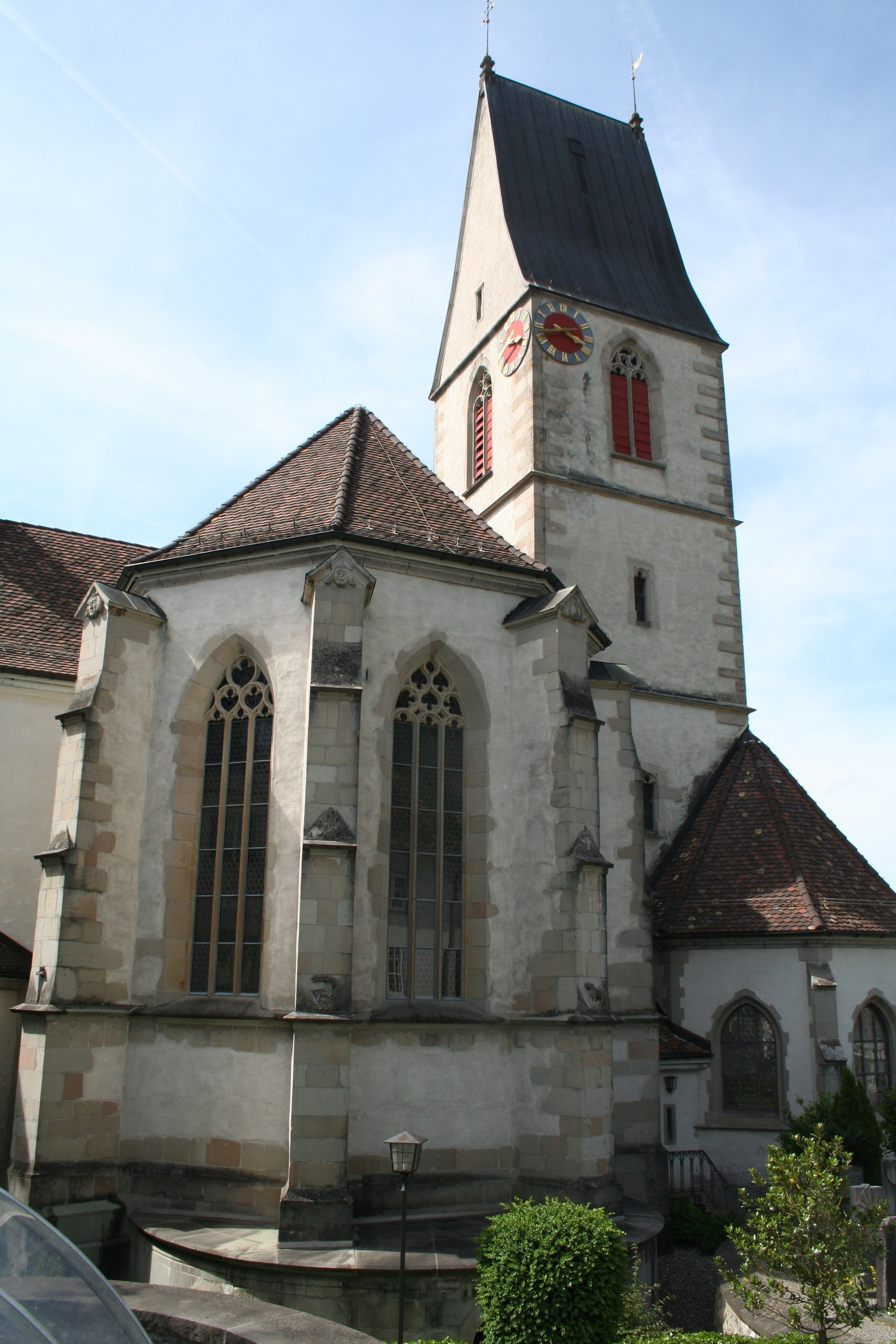
- Status: Imperial Abbey of the Holy Roman Empire
- Capital: Schänis Abbey
- Government: Theocracy
- Historical era: Middle Ages
  - Founded: 9th century
  - Granted Imp. immediacy by Emperor Henry III: 1045
  - Vogtei transferred from Windegg to cantons of Glarus and Schwyz: 1438
  - Abbey's rights confirmed by King Frederick IV: 1442
  - Abbey suspended during Protestant Reformation: 1529–31
  - Secularised by Napoleon's Act of Mediation: 19 February 1803
  - Dissolved by Great Council of St Gallen: 1811
Preceded by	Succeeded by
County of Lenzburg	Canton of St. Gallen
- Today part of: Switzerland

Schänis Abbey (German: Kloster Schänis) was founded in the 9th century. It was situated in the present town of Schänis in the canton of St. Gallen, Switzerland. It was a house of secular canonesses of the nobility (German: adliges Damenstift) and was dissolved in 1811.

== History ==
According to the report of a monk from Reichenau Abbey the founder was believed to be Count Hunfried of Chur-Rhaetia, who was said to have promised Charlemagne to make the foundation for the worthy safekeeping of a precious reliquary cross containing a fragments of the True Cross, as well as an onyx vessel containing some of the Blood of Christ. Such evidence as is available does indicate that the abbey was founded at about that time, possibly as a daughter foundation of St. Stephan's Abbey in Strasbourg, but the foundation at Schänis soon fell into obscurity.

After many years Ulrich I, Count of Lenzburg, restored the abbey to prosperity and a sound economic footing by numerous gifts of property. Also, by exchanges of land and rights of patronage he created a stable and unified ecclesiastical and parochial structure in the foundation's immediate vicinity. It was presumably at this time that the dedication was altered from the "Holy Cross" to Saint Sebastian.

In 1045 Emperor Henry III granted Schänis Abbey royal immunity and free election of its abbesses. Despite several attempts at reform Schänis remained a free secular canonry with relatively relaxed rules. In the 14th century it lost its estates in Vorarlberg and the Rhine valley.

The Vögte generally came from the greater aristocracy of the region. By inheritance from the Lenzburgs the Vogtei passed first to the counts of Kyburg, then later to the Habsburgs and the Counts of Toggenburg. By the transfer of the lordship of Windegg to the cantons of Glarus and Schwyz in 1438 the abbey passed, as part of the common overlordship of Windegg, to the Old Swiss Confederacy. Although the German Kaiser confirmed the abbey's rights in 1442, the connection to the Holy Roman Empire was broken; Glarus and Schwyz considered themselves from that point onwards as successors to the royal Vögte.

Nevertheless, the abbess continued to bear the title of Princess of the Holy Roman Empire. Despite further attempts to reform the abbey's monastic life, there was no compulsion to take vows and only women of the aristocracy were accepted as community members. Applicants were initially obliged to prove descent from four grandparents of the higher aristocracy, but later from 16 great-great-grandparents of the same rank. In this way Schänis became a place of care for the unmarried female offspring of the higher nobility of southern Germany.

During the Reformation the abbey was briefly suspended in 1529, but reinstated in 1531 after the re-Catholicisation of the Linthgebiet. In 1585 and again in 1610 it burnt down, with the destruction of all the ancient deeds and privileges. At the same time there were increasing conflicts with the protecting powers, Glarus and Schwyz, who felt the foundation to be an alien body and treated it accordingly.

In 1782 the community buildings and the church were refurbished in the Rococo style. After the end of the Old Swiss Confederacy in 1798 Schänis Abbey, by the operation of the Act of Mediation of 1803, lost all its feudal rights and was gradually forced to dispose of all possessions outside the canton of St. Gallen. In 1811 the Great Council of the canton dissolved the abbey. The community buildings were sold at auction and the church was taken over for the use of the parish.
