= Michael Stettler (art historian) =

Swiss art historian (1913–2003)

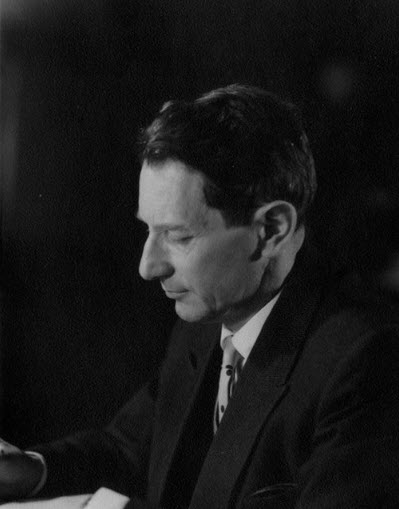
- Born: 1 January 1913; Bern, Switzerland
- Died: 18 June 2003 (aged 90); Steffisburg, Switzerland
- Education: ETH Zurich
- Occupations: Art historian; museum director; writer
- Spouse: Barbara von Albertini (m. 1945)
- Parents: Wilhelm Stettler (father); Ella von Graffenried (mother)
- Relatives: Eugen Stettler (grandfather)

Michael Stettler (1 January 1913 – 18 June 2003) was a Swiss art historian, museum director, and writer. He was director of the Bern Historical Museum from 1948 to 1961 and founding director of the Abegg Foundation (Abegg-Stiftung) in Riggisberg from 1961 to 1977.

== Biography ==
Michael Stettler was a member of the Stettler family. He was the son of Wilhelm Stettler, an architect, and Ella née von Graffenried. In 1945 he married Barbara von Albertini. He was a grandson of the architect Eugen Stettler.

He studied architecture at ETH Zurich and obtained his doctorate in 1940. He was an assistant at the Museum of Fine Arts Bern (Kunstmuseum Bern), and from 1942 he compiled the inventory for Die Kunstdenkmäler des Kantons Aargau (The art monuments of the canton of Aargau). Volume 1 appeared in 1948, and he was co-author of volume 2 (1953).

From 1948 to 1961 Stettler was director of the Bern Historical Museum, which he reorganized. From 1961 to 1977 he was the founding director of the Abegg Foundation in Riggisberg. He was president of the Gottfried Keller Foundation from 1948 to 1965 and a member of the foundation board (Stiftungsrat) of Pro Helvetia from 1965 to 1970.

Stettler published numerous contributions on art and architecture. He also wrote poems, literary portraits, and autobiographical notes. He received the literature prize of the city of Bern in 1953 and that of the canton of Bern in 1964, and honorary doctorates from the universities of Fribourg (1973) and Bern (1979). In 1993 he became an honorary citizen of Steffisburg.

== Bibliography ==
- Kunst + Architektur in der Schweiz, 54, 2003, no. 4, 76–77
- Berner Zeitschrift für Geschichte und Heimatkunde, 66, 2004, 221–222
