= Swiss units of measurement =

Units of measurement used in Switzerland

Before the adoption of the metric system, a great variety of units of measurement was used in the area of present-day Switzerland. The Romans introduced their own system in the 1st century BC. In the Middle Ages, determining and supervising weights and measures was one of the rights of lordship, and from the late Middle Ages the authorities tried to bring order to their variety.

In the concordat of 1835, twelve cantons agreed on a common system that was based on the meter but followed the old units, with the Fuss (foot) set at 30 cm and the Pfund (pound) at 500 g; it was introduced in 1838–1839. The federal act of 1851 tried to make it compulsory for all cantons. The metric system was legalized alongside the concordat system in 1868, Switzerland joined the Meter Convention in 1875, and from January 1877 the metric system was used throughout the country. In 1977 Switzerland adopted the International System of Units, whose base units have been the basis for measurement in Switzerland since 1978.

== System before metric system ==
Units were varied and were not in fixed values. During the transition to the metric system, units were fixed. Before 1856, almost every canton had its own system of units.

=== Length ===
A number of units were used to measure length. One pied (1 fuss) was equal to 0.30 m, according to the fixed value defined during the transition to the metric system. Some other units and their fixed values are given below:

1 ligne = 1/144 pied

1 linie = 1/144 pied

1 pouce = 1/12 pied

1 zoll = 1/12 pied

1 aune = 2 pied (or 4 pied)

1 elle = 2 pied

1 brache = 2 pied

1 toise = 6 pied

1 ruthe = 6 pied

1 perche = 16 pied (or 10 pied)

1 lieue = 16 000 pied. Lieue was used as a road measure.

=== Area ===
One arpent was 400 pied^{2} or 1.44 ha

=== Mass ===
A number of units were used to measure mass.

==== Ordinary ====
One livre (pfund of the Zollverein) was equal to 0.500 kg according to the fixed value defined during the transition to the metric system. Some other units and their fixed values are given below:

1 loth = 1/32 livre

1 once = 1/16 livre

1 quintal = 100 livre.

==== Medicine (apothecary or pharmacy) ====
One livre was equal to 0.375 kg according to the fixed value defined during the transition to the metric system. Some other units and their fixed values are given below:

1 grain = 1/5760 livre

1 scruple = 1/288 livre

1 drachme = 1/96 livre

1 once = 1/12 livre.

=== Capacity ===
Two main systems, dry and liquid, were used.

==== Dry ====
Several units were used to measure dry capacity. Some units are given below:

1 quarteron (divided into 1/4 and 1/16) = 10 emine = 15 L (0.4257 bushel)

1 double quarteron = 2 quarteron

1 sac = 10 quarteron.

Quarteron is the volume of 30 livre of pure water at 4 °C. Quarteron was equal to 5/9 of a cubic pied.

==== Liquid ====
Several units were used to measure liquid capacity. Some units are given below:

1 setier = 25 pot

1 muid = 4 setiers

1 pot = 1.5 L (1.585 quarts).

Pot was the bulk of 3 livres weight of pure water at the temperature of 4 °C. Pot was equal to 1/18 pied^{3} and was subdivided into 1/2, 1/4 and 1/8.

== History ==
=== Earliest weights and measures ===
The Roman jugerum and its subdivisions: schematic woodcut in Glarean's treatise on the units of measurement and coins of the Roman Empire and their modern equivalents (Liber de asse, & partibus eius), first edition, Basel, 1550

Measuring and weighing originally consisted of comparison with quantities that were always at hand, such as the foot, the pace, the thumb, the arm, the cup, the jug, the bucket, and the sack. These quantities, together with their names, later entered the systems of measurement of all countries.

The use of weights and measures in the area of present-day Switzerland can be traced from the 1st century BC with the Romans. They introduced their own system of weights and measures in all their provinces, as archaeological finds also show for Switzerland. From about AD 200 the Helvetii again used the Gallic road measure leuga, equal to 2.22 km or 1.5 Roman miles, alongside the Roman mile. Along Roman roads there were mile and leuga stones (milestones) giving the distance from the point of reference (for example a colonia). Other Celtic measures, however, such as a foot of about 31 cm, are difficult to pin down.

The end of the Roman period and the settlement of the Alemanni led to the decline of the Roman system of measures in Switzerland. As part of a larger cultural area (the Burgundian and Merovingian kingdoms), however, Switzerland remained integrated into a wider development of weights and measures, and the Roman tradition in measures of length and in weights continued there too. With slightly changed sizes, the pes (foot; German Fuss, French pied), the uncia (ounce; German Unze, French once, Italian oncia), the cubitus (ell; German Elle, Italian braccio), and the decempeda-pertica (rod; German Rute, French perche, Italian pertica) survived, as did the Roman subdivision of weights. A few pounds also show their Roman origin, such as the libbretta of Ticino and the French poids de marc (1 livre = 1.5 libra). Of the measures of capacity, some terms such as modius, sextarius, and hemina survived, but not the corresponding quantities. A characteristic of the post-Roman period is the absence of a general mathematical ordering of the various weights and measures. Every substance and every measurable activity had its own measures, which at first were only loosely correlated with one another and bore no relation to other measures. Not even liquid and grain measures, both of them measures of capacity, matched.

Knowledge of historical weights and measures rests largely on the measurements made in the 19th century. What lies further back in time is known by name from administrative records from the Middle Ages onward (among them tax rolls and rent rolls), but rarely as a concrete quantity. Nor do archaeological finds of early and high medieval vessels used as measures give reliable results. Moreover, the figures handed down from the 19th century represented the end point of a long development and were the outcome of reforms, only partly known, by which the authorities had tried from the late Middle Ages to bring order to an almost bewildering variety.

=== Weights and measures as an expression of lordship ===
In the Middle Ages, determining and supervising weights and measures was, along with other rights of lordship, one of the rights of manorial and judicial lordship (Grund- und Gerichtsherrschaft), in connection with the market, the court, and the power to tax. Lords (nobles, monasteries, and towns) determined the weights and measures valid in their territories and scattered holdings and had them checked at their market places. When the towns gradually acquired former manorial institutions on town land in the late Middle Ages, the right to weights and measures was among them. As a rule, a town's authority over weights and measures applied within the sphere of influence of the former lord of the town and of the town market, that is, usually only in the town itself and its immediate surroundings. Rights over large areas were rarer, for example those of Burgdorf, which in 1383 acquired from the counts of Kyburg the right to weights and measures in the whole of the Oberaargau. From the 15th century the city cantons (Stadtorte) sought uniformity in their territories by imposing the town's own weights and measures. Weights and measures of length, area, and liquids could be partly harmonized by the 18th century, but not grain measures, the old units of rents and tithes, to which places and regions clung stubbornly. Reforms of grain measures, such as Lucerne's in its rural territory in the 15th century or Bern's in Vaud in 1616–1617, therefore met local resistance, partly because of the legal uncertainty that was feared.

The lord's keeping of the peace at his market combined regulated supervision of weights and measures with the market court, which punished fraud. Visitors to the market had to pay a fee to use the public measures and the market lord's scales, and to have their own measures checked by the lord's official against a standard measure (Eichmass); only the measures customary in the place were permitted. From the 13th and 14th centuries, officials of the towns or of the countryside, or guilds, checked the weights and measures on market days. Depending on the place, public scales (among them scales for fish, rice, butter, and silver) were under the master of the weigh house, of the merchants' hall (Kaufhaus), or of the Sust (warehouse). Despite all the checks, the weights and measures for everyday use, made of wood or iron by village craftsmen and prone to warping and rust, proved deficient. In daily dealings, measuring and weighing achieved only approximate accuracy. Greater precision was achieved in weighing precious metals and medicines.

=== Influence of the economy on weights and measures ===
The spread of weights and measures depended not only on the political power of the responsible authority to impose them. Belonging to important economic areas played a more decisive role. In this respect southern Switzerland (Ticino and the southern valleys of the Grisons) belonged to northern Italy, and western Switzerland was under the influence of Savoy, France, and the Free County of Burgundy. The city of Basel looked to Alsace, whereas its rural territory, like the Swiss Plateau, was oriented toward southern Germany. Eastern Switzerland was traditionally linked with the area beyond the Rhine and Lake Constance, while the ties between the Grisons and Vorarlberg and Tyrol were looser.

Through the exchange of goods with international trading centers, foreign weights and measures came to Switzerland, took hold there, and displaced local units or existed alongside them, for example German and French commercial weights (the Antwerp or Cologne pound, the poids de marc) or measures of the foot and the ell (the pied de roi, the aune de roi, the braccio di Milano, and the Nuremberg and Rhenish foot). Unlike in international trade, where the foreign weights and measures were left unchanged, in regional trade they gave rise to new local measures, above all in the economically strong grain-growing regions. Bern contributed much to the standardization of weights and measures in its large territory, and the trade of Zurich shaped the country from the Rhine to the Alps of the Grisons. Central Switzerland, with the market of Lucerne, proved to be an intermediate region that combined influences from the north (Alsace, the Rhineland), the east (the market of Zurich), and the west (the farming country of Bern). The Napf–Reuss and Reuss–Aare lines formed barriers to east–west exchange. North of the Alps there were no southern influences on weights and measures worth mentioning.

The situation in the three pass regions of the Alps was different. Along its trade routes, the market town of Chur combined weights and measures from the area of Zurich, Vorarlberg, and Tyrol into systems of its own, but it had little influence on the Engadine and the southern valleys. In the upper Rhône valley, the different weights and measures of the individual valleys point to the independence of the Zenden (dizains) and the weakness of the central authority. Only in the 18th century did Valais open up to French influence. On the Gotthard route, foreign weights and measures were hardly integrated into the local units. Uri kept to its grain and wine market in Lucerne, and Ticino to northern Italy. In contrast, the Alpine regions from east to west agreed strikingly in the yield measures of their pasture farming (the Kuhrecht, literally "cow right").

=== Weights and measures in the Old Swiss Confederacy ===
Unlike the mathematically derived systems of weights and measures of the Romans, with their emphasis on decimal and duodecimal division, the systems later customary in Switzerland were based on other numbers, above all on four (Viertel, Vierling, Quartane), six (Sester, Ster), eight, twelve, and sixteen. Systems built on the numbers five, seven, and ten were not customary. The decimal structure of various weights and measures went back to reforms of the 18th and 19th centuries.

Various categories of weights and measures can be distinguished in all the systems. The most frequent were commercial weights and measures, that is, medium-sized, handy weights and measures for daily official and private use, as was common among traders, innkeepers, millers, and craftsmen, among others. They included units or basic measures and weights such as the foot (Fuss), the ell (Elle), the Viertel, the Mass, and the pound (Pfund). For grain and wine there were further categories: the transport measures for carriage by boat, wagon, and pack animal (Sack, Saum); the smaller carrying measures (Eimer, Brente), as quantities between consumption and transport; and finally the mere units of account of the administrators of granaries, cellars, and salt, oversized units of 250–1,000 liters for which there were no vessels to measure them.

The old practice of measuring and weighing had different weights and measures for different purposes. Certain units, however, were applied to other fields. Mountain areas, for example, also used their grain measures (Viertel, Fischel, bichet, mesure, staio, staro) to measure areas of arable land.

==== Linear and cubic measures ====
The Romans used the pace (gradus, passus), the forearm (cubitus), and the foot (pes), measures whose original lengths were approximately preserved. The most common measure of length in western and German-speaking Switzerland was the foot, a craftsman's measure of between about 26 and 36 cm. From the late Middle Ages three feet predominated: in the west the Paris or French foot (pied de roi) and the Bern foot (Bernfuss), and in the east and north the Nuremberg foot. Beyond the Bernese state (the canton of Bern, Vaud, and Aargau), the Bern foot was also used by its neighbors Fribourg, Solothurn, Biel, and Neuchâtel, alongside and in competition with the pied de roi. In the 18th century the latter displaced the Savoy foot in Geneva and local feet in the Prince-Bishopric of Basel and in Valais. The foot of the craftsmen's town of Nuremberg was able to spread from eastern Switzerland as far as the Reuss and into the Grisons (except for the southern valleys). The short town foot of Lucerne resembled the field foot (Feldschuh) of northern and western Switzerland (Basel, Neuchâtel, Vaud). Local feet survived in the mountain areas (the Bernese Oberland, Central Switzerland, the Engadine, and the Erguel). Because not every craft used the same foot, several feet were usually in use side by side in the same place. The building trades used the work foot (Werkschuh) and the quarryman's foot (Steinbrecherschuh); woodworkers used the Paris and Bern feet in the west and the Nuremberg foot in the east; and surveyors used the field foot (Feldschuh, Feldmessfuss, pied de commissaire).

The ell (Elle), the cloth measure, was roughly two to four times the length of the foot, but was not derived from the local foot. In German-speaking Switzerland and the Grisons, ells of about two feet were used, and in western Switzerland aunes (German Stab) twice as long, four feet in length. In southern Switzerland, which had no measures of the foot until the 19th century, the cloth and craftsman's measure braccio had the length of an ell. Where cloth manufacture and the cloth trade had long played an important role, as in eastern, western, and southern Switzerland, different cloth measures were used for linen, wool, and silk, some of them corresponding to those of trading partners. Thus southern Switzerland, like Lombardy, measured with a long cloth ell (braccio lungo) and a short silk ell (braccio corto). The ells of eastern Switzerland resembled those of southern Germany. Through the cloth trade with France, the French aune de roi prevailed in western Switzerland (as far as the Saane) from the late Middle Ages, and further local cloth measures of various sizes were derived from it. In German-speaking Switzerland the aune de roi was used as the Pariser Stab (Paris Stab) for muslin and cotton.

The measures of land surveying, the Klafter and the Rute (rod), as well as the cubic Klafter (toise cube), a measure of volume, were also based on the foot, as a rule on the local feet (except in the Grisons, St. Gallen, and Valais). In Valais, various toises point to old feet that have disappeared. Klafter measures were used in the building trades, and the square Klafter (toise carrée) and the square Rute (perche carrée) in field surveying. The smaller firewood measure with a shorter log length, the wood or forest Klafter (Holzklafter or Waldklafter; French toise pour le bois, moule, corde; in Ticino spazzo and catasta), differed from the cubic Klafter with equal sides used to measure hay, peat, and coal.

==== Land measures (measures of area) ====
Land measures were mostly not derived from measures of length but were based on an estimate of the work done within a certain time. What was plowed in a day's work was called Juchart, Tagehri, Mal, or journal; what was mown, Mannwerk, Tagwan, or faux. The grain-growing zone of the Swiss Plateau had the largest measures for arable land and meadowland, in contrast to the small ones of the hill and mountain regions of southern Grisons, Valais, Ticino, and the Jura. Measures for meadowland, which had once been partly smaller (Aargau, Zurich) and partly up to twice as large (Neuchâtel) as the local measure for arable land, were largely adjusted to those for fields through intervention by the authorities by the 18th century. The large forest Jucharten of the Swiss Plateau (Aargau, Zurich, the St. Gallen Rhine Valley), on the other hand, survived until the 19th century. In viticulture the estimated measures Manngrab, Mannsschnitz, or ouvrier were used. In the old wine-growing areas of western and eastern Switzerland these were smaller than the measures for arable land, but in the younger ones of the Swiss Plateau they were of similar size. In regions with Alpine pasture farming, such as the higher hill country, the Jura, and the pre-Alpine and Alpine areas, yield measures were used alongside measures of area, or even exclusively. Because the yield of an Alpine pasture varies greatly with altitude, exposure to the sun, and the quality of the soil and of its upkeep, only a determination of size by yield made sense. The yield capacity of a pasture was therefore estimated by the number of cows summered on it. From this developed the Kuhrecht, which is both an entitlement to pasture and a measure of pasture use, and which is still customary in the mountain areas.

==== Grain measures ====
The market square of Gruyères, photographed by Charles Morel, a postcard publisher in Bulle, c. 1920. The measures cut in granite in the foreground were first mentioned in the cadastral plan of 1745, but certainly existed earlier; the largest cavity is a coupe holding 51.8 liters.

Until the 19th century, grain, pulses, nuts, and salt were not weighed but measured by volume. Measures of capacity, called dry measures (Dürrmasse or Trockenmasse), served as measuring instruments. In some areas (Aargau, Central and eastern Switzerland), different measures were used for dehusked ("smooth") and unhusked ("rough") grain. In no other field did the variety of measures remain so great, because in the grain-growing regions the authorities' reforms met with resistance from the rural population, who feared that changes would bring a hidden increase in ground rents and tithes. Standardization did succeed, however, in areas that depended on urban grain markets, such as the Bernese Oberland, Central Switzerland, and the Grisons.

The most widespread were the smaller commercial measures, which held 10 to 38 liters depending on the area and were filled at the market, according to local custom, either level or heaped. They in turn corresponded to a quarter (quarteron, staio, Fischel) or a sixth (Sester, staro, Ster) of larger transport units such as the Sack and the Mütt. The latter were based on the loads a man could carry and, whatever they were called, consisted of the usual commercial sacks of drill (Zwilch) holding from 65 to over 150 liters. Large measures of up to 840 liters, such as the Malter, the Viernzel, the bichot, and the large muid, were units of account without a measuring vessel. Where two systems of measures met, both were used in reckoning. At the transition from the Bernese Mütt–Mäss system to the Vaud sac–quarteron system, for example, Fribourg combined both into a system of its own with the muid, the sac, and the bichet (= Mäss).

For salt, an important commodity, measures of capacity were used: the Sack (sac) in the west, and the Mäss and the Viertel in the east. The wagon (Wagen, French sommée), of about 495 kg, was a unit of account in western Switzerland, while in eastern Switzerland the barrel (Röhrli) of 165–270 kg was used as a transport unit. In the 18th century the authorities, for example Zurich in 1772, changed from measuring to weighing. The French salt weight of 489.5 g was the most widespread.

==== Liquid measures ====
For liquids, separate measures of capacity were used again, although a few systems extended over larger areas, such as the Saum, the Eimer (Brente), and the Mass in German-speaking Switzerland, from Fürstenberg to the Alps and from the Saane to Lake Constance. The west, including the Jura and Valais, had the system of the char, the setier (brante), and the pot; southern Switzerland had that of the brenta, the staio, and the pinta (boccale). The most important units for wine and water, the Mass, pot, pinta, or boccale, held between about 1 and more than 2 liters. Towns sometimes used smaller measures than their rural surroundings, and dairy-farming areas larger units. Wine was carried from the cask in the cellar to the cart in front of the house in open wooden vessels, the carrying measures Eimer, Brente, and Zuber (Tinne, coupe). Wooden casks holding up to 180 liters served as transport measures (Saum). Large measures such as the Fuder (bosse) were mere units of account without a measuring vessel. Special measures were used for milk, oil, and honey. In the 17th and 18th centuries, with fruit growing from Aargau to eastern Switzerland, measures for cider (Trübmasse for Most) and, newly, measures for spirits gained in importance.

==== Weights ====
Weights were related to one another far more than measures were. Most were derived from the Roman weight; in some cases the weight itself was adopted, in others only the term and the division. In the area of present-day Switzerland the unit was almost everywhere called the pound (Pfund), but very different weights lay behind this name. They ranged from light "little pounds" (Pfündchen) of just over 300 g, related to the Roman pound, to heavy pounds of over 900 g. The division into ounces was adopted from the Roman weight, the ounces weighing different amounts and their number varying with the weight of the pound in question. All weight systems had a rigid structure: the German system with the Unze, the Lot, and the Quent; the French with the once and the denier; and the Italian with the oncia and the denaro.

The distribution of the various weights in Switzerland shows how great the influence of neighboring economic areas, trading centers, and international transport routes was. Weights of international standing, such as the French poids de marc and the Antwerp or Cologne pound, were the most important commercial and special weights. Normally at least two weights were in use in a place: a light supraregional pound for trade goods and spices, and a heavy local one for bulk goods. Southern Switzerland, like Lombardy, had the light libbrette in trade and the heavy libbre grosse in the local exchange of goods. Zurich, eastern Switzerland, and the Grisons used the Antwerp pound as their commercial weight; in Chur it was called the Ladenpfund, and the Krinne of the Grisons was derived from it. The heavy pounds resembled those in southern Germany and Vorarlberg. In the first quarter of the 15th century, Zurich and Lucerne imposed the Zurzach or old Zurich pound as the commercial weight in their markets, and it soon became valid from the Rhine to Uri and in the Grisons. Urban centers also had special weights for metals (precious metals, iron, brass), medicinal and apothecary goods, and silk.

Most important old units of measurement in Switzerland from the Middle Ages to the 19th century
	German	French	Italian
Length	Fuss	pied	
Length	Elle		braccio
Length	Stab	aune	
Area	Juchart	pose	pertica
Area	Manngrab	fossorier, ouvrier	
Area	Mannwerk, Mad	seiteur, faux	
Cubic	Klafter (Holzklafter)	toise, moule, corde	spazzo, catasta
Grain	Viertel, Sester	quarteron, quart	staio, staro
Grain	Mäss, Fischel	bichet, mesure, fichelin, boisseau	
Grain	Mütt, Sack	muid, coupe, sac	
Grain	Malter, Viernzel	bichot	moggio
Salt	Sack, Wagen	sac, sommée	
Beverages	Mass	pot	pinta, boccale
Beverages	Schoppen	pinte	boccale
Beverages	Eimer, Ohm	setier	staio
Beverages	Brente, Zuber	brante, tinne	brenta
Beverages	Saum, Lagel		soma
Beverages	Fuder	char, bosse	
Weights	Pfund, Krinne	livre	libbra, libbretta
Weights	Unze	once	oncia
Weights	Zentner, Ledi		

=== Transition to international systems in the 19th century ===
In the wake of the French Revolution, a new system of weights and measures based on the units of the meter and the gram and on decimal counting was created in France between 1790 and 1799. In 1801 Switzerland received a copy of the prototype meter kept in Paris. However, the Helvetic law on weights and measures introducing metric units in Switzerland, drafted and decreed in 1801, was never implemented. From 1803 the supervision of weights and measures passed to the cantons, which now also took the initiative for standardization at the national level, especially as the Federal Diet (Tagsatzung) had been unable to agree on a reform.

For trade with France, the cantons of western Switzerland introduced wholly or partly metric systems between 1800 and 1827, but kept the old names for the new units. In 1826 the canton of Ticino adopted, in a system of its own, some of the old weights and measures of Milan. From 1828 an intercantonal commission drew up a Swiss system of weights and measures that was based on the meter but followed the old weights and measures. In the concordat of 1835, twelve cantons joined together to introduce it, which was done in 1838–1839.

With the creation of the federal state in 1848, the regulation of weights and measures became a federal responsibility. Supervision was left to the cantons, but these were placed under the overall supervision of the federal verification office (Eidgenössische Eichstätte), founded in 1862. The federal act of 1851 tried to put an end to the existing variety by making the partly metric concordat system of 1835 compulsory for all cantons, but western and southern Switzerland did not want to give up their new systems, and Uri insisted on its own. The coexistence of different systems continued until, as a first step, the metric system was legalized alongside the concordat system in 1868. As a second step, Switzerland then joined the Meter Convention in Paris in 1875. In January 1877 weights and measures were standardized throughout Switzerland in the metric system.

Swiss weights and measures, 1838–1876
Linear measures	1 Fuss = 10 Zoll = 100 Linien = 1,000 Striche
Linear measures	1 Klafter = 6 Fuss = 1.8 m
Linear measures	1 Rute = 10 Fuss = 3 m
Linear measures	Unit: 1 Fuss = 30 cm
Linear measures	1 Swiss Wegstunde = 16,000 Fuss = 4.8 km
Area measures	1 square Fuss = 0.09 m^{2}
Area measures	1 Juchart = 40,000 square Fuss = 36 ares
Cubic measures	1 cubic Klafter = 6 × 6 × 6 Fuss = 5.8 m^{3}
Cubic measures	1 Holzklafter = 6 × 6 × 3 Fuss = 2.9 steres
Dry measures for grain	1 Malter = 10 Viertel = 100 Immi or 40 Vierling
Dry measures for grain	Unit: 1 Viertel = 15 L
Liquid measures	1 Saum = 4 Viertelsaum (Eimer, Branten) = 100 Mass
Liquid measures	Unit: 1 Mass = 1.5 L
Weights	1 Pfund = 32 Lot = 128 Viertellot
Weights	1 Zentner = 100 Pfund
Weights	Unit: 1 Pfund = 500 g

=== Basis of knowledge of old weights and measures ===
In the course of the introduction of new measures between 1800 and 1857, the cantonal verifiers (Eichmeister), on behalf of their governments, determined the old local standard weights and measures by comparison with the new units. On the basis of these cantonal conversion tables, which are now kept in state archives and cantonal libraries, Friedrich Ris-Schnell, director of the federal verification office in Bern, compiled in 1889 the first overview of the old weights and measures in Switzerland, which he published in Alfred Furrer's Volkswirtschafts-Lexikon der Schweiz (4 vols., 1889–1892). Thanks to new technical aids, the cantonal tables are highly precise. In view of the inherent inaccuracy of the old practices of measuring and weighing and of the often faulty standard measures, however, the conversion tables on the one hand give a false impression of additional variety, and on the other hand included only the most important weights and measures, so that local variants, among them numerous small measures, were not taken into account. Important information on these, however, can be found in dialect dictionaries.
