= Hintersassen =

Non-citizen residents in Swiss history

In Switzerland, in the late Middle Ages and until the 16th century, Hintersassen (also Hintersässen; sometimes used synonymously with Ansassen, Beisassen and Insassen; French: habitants or résidents; Italian: dimoranti) were the people who "sat behind" a lord, that is, who were subject to a bailiff (Vogt), a judicial lord or a landlord (lordship). Later, the term mainly designated those who moved to an urban or rural commune or settled under a territorial authority, and who, as inhabitants with lesser rights, did not hold the full citizenship (Bürgerrecht, Landrecht or Dorfrecht) of the long-established town citizens, the Landleute of the rural cantons, and the members of the communes and villages. This usage appeared earlier in the towns and rural cantons than in the rural communes. Compared with the Aufenthalter (farmhands, servants and journeymen), the Hintersassen were more permanently resident in the commune, often with their own household, and more closely integrated into local society and the local economy (freedom of domicile). The status of the Tauner, by contrast, is to be defined primarily in economic terms.

== Admission ==
In the urban cantons, the admission of Hintersassen was the responsibility of the commune or of the council, and in the 17th and 18th centuries sometimes also of special commissions (Hintersassenkommissionen) that supervised the Hintersassen. In the Landsgemeinde cantons, this function was exercised by the Landsgemeinde or the Nachgemeinde (an assembly held after the Landsgemeinde to deal with business left pending), the Landrat or the Grand Council. In the subject territories, by contrast, the communes had a say in the decision, even though they could not always assert this right, particularly when applications for admission were disputed, against the territorial authority, which counted the right to confirm the admission of citizens and Hintersassen among its sovereign powers. In the associates (zugewandte Orte) such as Geneva, Neuchâtel and the Prince-Bishopric of Basel, too, the admission of Hintersassen depended on the consent of the communal authorities.

Hintersassen ordinance of the town of Schaffhausen of 1679, 18th-century copy (Staatsarchiv Schaffhausen, Ordnungen A 20, 289). The ordinances handed down for Schaffhausen from the 16th century onward record the rights and duties of the Hintersassen. Their duties included firefighting, military service, and labor and watch duties. As the Hintersassen of Schaffhausen mostly worked in the vineyards as day laborers or under contract, knowledge of viticulture was a condition of admission. The ordinance of 1679 was the first to require every newly admitted Hintersasse to plant and tend six oaks, which were needed to produce tanbark.

Admission as a Hintersasse depended on several conditions: a certain length of residence in the commune, an official certificate of free and honorable birth (Mannrecht), proof of a certain amount of property, the practice of a craft or trade needed in the locality, and membership of the dominant confession. It was also indispensable to pay a one-time entry fee (Einzugsgeld) and an annual fee, the Einsitzgeld or Hintersassengeld (French: deniers de résidence, habitation), which was often shared between the commune and the lordship, and to deposit a surety, called Trostung, to secure solvency, for example in the event of debts. On admission, the Hintersasse had to swear an oath of loyalty and obedience to the town, the rural canton or the authorities.

== Development ==
While the Hintersassen did not yet form a sharply defined group in the late Middle Ages, and the distance between citizens and Hintersassen appears to have been still slight, not least because of the high turnover, their more precarious legal status became more pronounced from the 16th century onward. This was a consequence of population growth, of the growing pressure on the means of subsistence and income in agriculture, crafts, trade, government and administration, and of the pressing problems of poor relief policy. From the late 16th and the 17th century in particular, citizenship, Landrecht and village rights began to be closed off. This can be seen in the introduction and steady increase of entry fees, in the creation of new categories of citizens (Ewige Einwohner, "perpetual inhabitants"), and sometimes even in communes ceasing to admit new citizens and Hintersassen. As a result, the Hintersassen grew as a population group and acquired the profile characteristic of the ancien régime, although the diversity of local conditions must be taken into account. In urban and rural settings alike, however, the Hintersassen remained excluded from the decisive rights of the citizens, Landleute or village members, but were often called upon to fulfill their duties, such as firefighting, military service, taxes and labor services. Marriage restrictions and disadvantages in the allocation of church pews show how the relationship between citizens and Hintersassen was also expressed in social and everyday distinctions.

== In the towns ==
Constitutional conditions and the economic interests of the citizens led to considerable differences in the share of Hintersassen among urban households. It was 5.4% in Zurich in 1756, 25.7% in Basel in 1779, 46% in Geneva in 1781 (including the natifs), and 52.3% in Bern in 1764. The status of the Hintersassen was shaped on the one hand by their exclusion from the guilds, the prohibition on acquiring houses and land, and the denial of any political participation: they had no access to the communal assembly, were not eligible for the council, and thus had no access to the higher offices of government and administration. On the other hand, they suffered social discrimination. However, one cannot speak of shared living conditions, particularly in the towns with a high proportion of Hintersassen and in view of their social and occupational differentiation.

== In the countryside ==
In the countryside, the Hintersassen generally had no access to the use of the communal property (the common land or Allmend, forest and pasture), or only limited access without legal security. Their situation was also marked by exclusion from political decisions, by restrictions on buying or leasing land and on practicing crafts and trades (freedom of trade and industry), and by a freedom of movement that was sometimes restricted. In the countryside, too, the Hintersassen had to pay a one-time entry fee and, every year, obtain an extension of their residence for a fee. They always had to reckon with the commune ordering their expulsion out of fear of outside competition on the local land and marriage market.

As in the towns, the Hintersassen in the rural communes did not form a homogeneous marginal group, even though they included more of the very poor than the local citizens did. Their share of the local population fell within a range comparable to that of the towns: in the 18th century it was often between 5% and 15%, but seldom more than 20%. The exceptional example of the Emmental, where Hintersassen made up as much as 30% of the population in some communes and took part in political life, shows how much local conditions determined their position. After the abandonment of the three-field system and the distribution of the common land among the farms in the 16th century, most communes in the Emmental were left without communal property, which made acquiring their citizenship unattractive. In this region, poor and rich households are thus found equally among both citizens and Hintersassen.

== Political equality ==
Although the political equality of the Hintersassen with the citizens under the Helvetic Republic was short-lived, the foundation was laid at that time for the principle, which still shapes most cantons today, of the dualism between the residents' commune (Einwohnergemeinde) and the citizens' commune (Bürgergemeinde). After some cantons had led the way in 1831, the introduction of the Einwohnergemeinde and political equality in federal and cantonal matters were laid down in the Federal Constitution of 1848. Swiss citizens who had settled in a commune were placed on an equal footing with the commune's own citizens in all communal matters only with the Federal Constitution of 1874.

== Bibliography ==
- J. J. Blumer, Staats- und Rechtsgeschichte der schweizerischen Demokratien oder der Kantone Uri, Schwyz, Unterwalden, Glarus, Zug und Appenzell, 2/I, 1858, 312–328
- Schweizerisches Idiotikon, 7, 1347–1360
- W. A. Liebeskind, "Die Hintersässen im Glarner Landrecht des 16. Jahrhunderts", in Beiträge zur Geschichte des Landes Glarus, 1952, 79–99
- P. Caroni, Le origini del dualismo comunale svizzero, 1964
- A. Perrenoud, La population de Genève du seizième au début du dix-neuvième siècle, 1979
- K. Bächtold, "Die Hintersassen in der Stadt Schaffhausen", in Schaffhauser Beiträge zur Geschichte, 59, 1982, 18–43
- R. Braun, Das ausgehende Ancien Régime in der Schweiz, 1984, 115–121, 148–163
- Livre des habitants de Genève, ed. A. Perrenoud, 1985
- M.-J. Ducommun, D. Quadroni, Le Refuge protestant dans le Pays de Vaud (fin XVII^{e}–début XVIII^{e} siècle), 1991, 238–243
- A.-M. Dubler, "Der 'Hintersässe' – ein armer Fremder, ein Gemeindeglied ohne politische Rechte?", in Schweizerisches Archiv für Volkskunde, 89, 1993, 143–164
- H. Berner, Gemeinden und Obrigkeit im fürstbischöflichen Birseck, 1994, 257–309
- M. Galgano, Die Beisassen des Alten Landes Schwyz zwischen 1798 und 1803, licentiate thesis, Fribourg, 2003
