= Feudal dues in Switzerland =

Pre-revolutionary seigneurial charges in Switzerland and their abolition

Feudal dues (German: Feudallasten; French: redevances féodales) is the term for all the charges, fees, taxes, and services from the period before the French Revolution that subordinates (subjects, tenant farmers, serfs) owed to a lord by virtue of a personal relationship of dependence and lordship in the territory of present-day Switzerland. Although the adjective "feudal" might suggest only dues derived from fief law, the French Revolution applied the word to everything connected with pre-revolutionary lordship. The German term Feudallasten arose during the Helvetic Republic as a translation of the French redevances féodales, serving as a collective label for all pre-revolutionary charges—those of feudal law as well as those arising from judicial, personal, ecclesiastical, and landed lordship.

The term as coined by the revolutionaries carried an implication of illegitimacy, and Marxism–Leninism added that of exploitation, holding that feudal dues served to exploit the peasantry. This ideological interpretation influenced the 20th-century image of the Middle Ages and the Ancien Régime; the Brockhaus of 1908, for instance, spoke of dues "oppressing" the peasantry.

== Origin and development ==
Feudal dues did not originally carry the meaning given to them in later interpretations. Emerging gradually from the Early Middle Ages, these charges, fees, taxes, and services functioned as a return offered by dependents (free or unfree) for a service provided by a superior, a powerful, or a propertied person—a secular or ecclesiastical lord. The service might be a thing, such as a farm made available to a peasant who paid a rent in return, or a public-law institution such as a court, or the personal protection that the arms-bearing noble gave to his dependents, or to traveling merchants, in exchange for the bailiwick due or safe conduct payment. This reciprocity of service and counter-service between a lord and his dependents characterized the society of estates. Very varied, the feudal dues mostly dated from before the 15th century; they were paid in kind, in labor (corvées) or, for a minority of later creation, in money. Economically, the agricultural dues were the material backbone and principal income of secular and ecclesiastical lordship in the Middle Ages.

Most dues stemmed from landed and judicial lordship. Labor services and rents in kind reflected an archaic organization of work, while money dues (often the conversion of former dues in kind) grew out of the money economy. Alongside the rents levied on holdings, the corvées point to the peasants' former obligation to cultivate the lord's demesne. As original owner of the land, the lord could demand fees for forest pasturing (pannage) and for concessionary enterprises. The judicial lord received the proceeds of fines, levied fees, and used corvées to maintain his buildings; as guarantor of public order and security—pursuing criminals and supervising the routes by land and water—he was entitled to the confiscated property of the condemned and to traffic dues (tolls, safe conduct). The dues on persons (bailiwick and advocacy dues) were compensation to the lord charged with personal protection. Serfdom gave rise to dues later sharply criticized, such as mortmain, the poll tax, the right of withdrawal, and the marriage tax levied on marriage outside the lordship—though these represented reduced claims compared with the lord's original assertion of full disposal over the persons and property of his serfs. The ecclesiastical tithe, owed in return for pastoral and later also social and educational services, was one of the most profitable levies before 1800; although not strictly a feudal due, the tithe was central to the peasants' struggle for abolition.

The reason the feudal dues were attacked as "illegitimate" at the end of the 18th century was chiefly that they had lost their original character as a justified return for a seigneurial service. Most were "perpetual" and unalterable: the amount of a rent, for example, had remained nominally unchanged over centuries, so that its capitalized real value generally lay, from the 17th century, well below half the market value of the parcels. The tenant had thus risen to the status of an owner and the lord had sunk to that of a mere rentier. The diversity of these rights posed administrative problems for the lords, who had sought to replace dues in kind with money dues that were easier to manage but exposed to currency depreciation; given the high mobility of the late-medieval population, dues attaching to persons, especially serfs, had been converted into landed charges on peasant holdings.

The social origin of the holders of these rights had also changed. In the Middle Ages, lordships, lands, and dues belonged to the nobility or to the ecclesiastical institutions it had founded or endowed. From the 14th century they passed increasingly to towns and townspeople who, grown wealthy, bought them from nobles in need of ready money; at the same time towns and burghers began to acquire rights of patronage, and thus tithes, even before the authorities of the Protestant cantons seized the rights of ecclesiastical lordships (secularization). Lordships (allods or fiefs) and private and public institutions were already freely traded; soon landed charges too could be mortgaged, pledged, divided, bequeathed, or sold, like rent-charges, sometimes detached from any link to the land. In this process of commercialization the feudal dues lost their original function. By the end of the 18th century the surviving dues could be irritating (especially the corvées) but were no longer a heavy burden, since the real value of the money rents, fixed in the late Middle Ages, had generally fallen; mortgage debts, contracted in particular to buy out co-heirs, weighed far more heavily on the peasantry. Only the tithe, paid in kind, had kept the same rate—a levy of 10 percent on the produce of the soil, the only regular tax of the Ancien Régime, which fell almost exclusively on the rural population.

=== Types of feudal due ===
The dues were conventionally grouped by the kind of lordship from which they arose:

- Personal lordship: the bailiwick due (Vogtzins; compensation to the bailiff for personal protection, often a hen or a measure of oats); corvées (transport and labor services); and the advocacy due, owed to the Vogt who exercised justice on behalf of an abbey or chapter.
- Serfdom: mortmain (Fall, the lord's claim to the best beast, garment, weapon, or bed from a dependent's movable estate—originally a right to all of a serf's movable goods); the right of withdrawal (Abzug, a property tax on those leaving the lordship, replacing the serf's former bondage to the soil); the marriage tax (on marriage between serfs of different lords, originally forbidden); and the poll tax (originally a personal head tax, later a money rent on holdings).
- Landed lordship: ground rents, hereditary and emphyteutic rents (rent for a holding or a concessionary enterprise such as a mill, forge, or bakery); the plot due owed to a town lord; Tagwen (labor services originally for the lord's demesne—mowing, harvest, plowing, threshing, woodcutting); the oat due for forest and pasture rights; pannage (for gathering acorns and beechmast to fatten pigs); banalities (for the use of a seigneurial establishment—tavern, mill, press, oven); and the water due (for the use of water power).
- Judicial lordship: fines (which paid the judges); corvées for maintaining the lord's buildings; the beadle's due (in hens or grain, for court auxiliaries); the Ohmgeld (an indirect tax on alcoholic drinks, levied chiefly by towns and, from the 15th century, by territorial rulers); safe conduct (for the protection of travelers); tolls (on persons and goods using roads, bridges, and ferries); a lump-sum grain due for local use of a bridge; the right to stray livestock and swarms; confiscation of the property of banished or executed criminals; and the right to the estates of illegitimate persons and foreigners.
- Ecclesiastical lordship: tithes (great and small tithes, the tithe on young animals, and others—one tenth of field and garden produce, the increase of herds, hay, and so on, originally for the upkeep of the parish church and, from the 16th century, also for poor relief and schooling); novalia (tithe on newly cleared land); and first fruits (the clergy's right to the first grain and young animals).

== Redemption ==
=== Before the Helvetic Republic ===
Cases of redeeming feudal dues for money appear already in the late Middle Ages, particularly early in the Prealps: in 1395 the people of Glarus agreed with Säckingen Abbey to convert the mortmain dues, tithes, and ground rents owed to it into a money rent. From the 1440s, peasants in the grain-growing Plateau refused dues (tithes, corvées, Ohmgeld, transfer fees) they wished to shed, wholly or in part, but the effects were limited because secular and ecclesiastical lords received the backing of the sovereign authorities. In the unrest of 1525, emboldened by the Reformation, the peasants demanded not the redemption of dues but their abolition—especially of the tithes, the corvées, and the charges tied to serfdom, whose suppression they also sought. Lords and authorities rejected most of these demands on the basis of established rights, but some change followed: Basel and Bern abolished the small tithes in the secularized ecclesiastical lordships, and in 1532 Bern permitted the conversion of the hay and young-animal tithes into money. During the peasant war of 1653 the general abolition of feudal dues was no longer at issue; in the 17th and 18th centuries various circles, peasant and otherwise, called with some success—sometimes amid social unrest—for the redemption or reduction of mortmain and transfer dues. For mortmain, Zürich confined itself to a declaration of intent in 1768, but Bern authorized redemption in the Oberaargau in 1792 and the prince-abbot of St. Gallen did so in his lands in 1795–1796.

=== Attempts under the Helvetic Republic ===
The republican government held, on natural-law grounds—as the liberals would later—that property should be freed of the traditional charges regarded as "feudal," that is, as illegitimately imposed by tyrannical lords. On 4 May 1798 a provisional decree abolished the feudal dues "attaching to persons," though their definition and origin were unclear; heedless of this, the population hoped, as at the time of the Reformation, that abolition would extend in particular to the tithes, the ground rents, and the tolls. But the law of 10 November 1798 abolished without compensation only the low-value dues—the small and novalia tithes, transfer fees, mortmain, and grain dues—while the important levies, above all the great tithe, had to be redeemed; the question of tolls was not addressed.

Compulsory redemption was governed by a complicated procedure. The state was to collect 2 percent of the land's value from those liable and to compensate the former recipients with fifteen times the average income of the years 1775–1788 for tithes, and fifteen times the value of rents in kind or twenty times that of money rents. As early as 1801 the Republic raised the compensation, in cases of voluntary redemption, to twenty times the average yield. Short of money, since it could collect neither redemption payments nor taxes, it eventually reinstated the feudal dues, which provoked the Bourla-Papey uprising in the canton of Léman in 1802.

=== The work of the cantons ===
The redemption that the Helvetic Republic had been unable to carry through became, after 1803, a task of the cantons, all of which tied it to the introduction of a tax. The tithes had to be replaced, since public worship, poor relief, and education depended on them, whether they were mostly state property (Protestant cantons) or the property of ecclesiastical institutions (Catholic cantons; 90 percent of the tithes at Lucerne, for example).

The pace varied by region. It was rapid in the Latin cantons, which chose compulsory and favorable redemptions (in Vaud, for example, the compensation was only five times the annual income). In the former Prince-Bishopric of Basel (the Bernese Jura from 1815), the feudal dues had already been abolished without compensation under French rule. But in most cantons the procedure, on a voluntary basis, lasted decades. In the grain-growing regions, the larger and middling peasants redeemed most of the tithes—which hindered the introduction of new techniques—before 1815, either in cash (a favorable market having enriched them) or by taking out mortgages, while the ground rents remained. Poor harvests and crises then slowed the process. To revive it, the liberal governments of Thurgau, Solothurn, Fribourg, Bern, and Neuchâtel made redemption compulsory and set more favorable terms; the Bernese radicals went so far as to halve the redemption price in 1846.

After 1850, the progress made in redeeming the tithes (97 percent complete in Thurgau by about 1862, for example) meant that this charge scarcely hindered the modernization of agriculture and the shift to market-oriented individual farming. The cantons then turned to liquidating the remaining feudal dues, above all the ground rents: Lucerne, Zürich, and Thurgau ordered their definitive conversion into money at low rates between 1861 and 1865. The last survivals disappeared only with the federal land register created under the Swiss Civil Code of 1912, which admits only charges connected with the economic nature of the burdened property or serving the needs of a dominant property (articles 782–792).

== Bibliography ==
- R. J. Böppli, Die Zehntablösung in der Schweiz, speziell im Kanton Zürich, 1914
- G. Franz, "Der Kampf um das 'alte Recht' in der Schweiz im ausgehenden Mittelalter", in Vierteljahrschrift für Sozial- und Wirtschaftsgeschichte, 26, 1933, 105–145
- H. Rennefahrt, Grundzüge der bernischen Rechtsgeschichte, 4, 1936, 144–172
- H. Nabholz, "Der Kampf der Schweizerbauern um Autonomie und Befreiung von den Grundlasten", in Wirtschaft und Kultur, 1938, 484–502 (repr. 1966)
- G. P. Chamorel, La liquidation des droits féodaux dans le Canton de Vaud 1798–1821, 1944
- M. Lemmenmeier, Luzerns Landwirtschaft im Umbruch, 1983, 159–199
- F. Walter, Les campagnes fribourgeoises à l'âge des révolutions (1798–1856), 1983, 113–158
- J. Stark, Zehnten statt Steuern, 1993
