= Seigneurial rights in Switzerland =

Lordship-based rights in medieval and early modern Switzerland

Seigneurial rights in Switzerland (German: Herrschaftsrechte; French: droits seigneuriaux) is a modern term in historical scholarship—not a term found in the sources—for the body of rights that, in the Middle Ages and the early modern period, were based on lordship. In the legal sources of those periods, these rights generally appear only individually. Revolutionaries later loosely labeled them "feudal," a collective term absent from the sources.

Seigneurial rights comprised both the protective prerogatives and duties of a lordship toward its subjects and the lord's right to dues (feudal charges) and taxes, in kind or in money, as well as to services intended to cover the lord's expenses. Their diversity reflects the many forms of lordship—over persons, over serfs, landed, judicial, territorial, urban, and ecclesiastical—and the wide range of their holders, from the head of a household to the emperor. Already in the Middle Ages they constituted assets that could be divided, bequeathed, exchanged, pledged, given, or sold almost without restriction, which gave them the character of private property. They were not subject to prescription and often survived until the abolition of feudal charges in the 19th century.

== Rights over persons ==
The earliest seigneurial rights were based on the Munt (the protective and commanding authority of the head of a household over his family, servants, and guests). From it, the king, the nobility, and the higher clergy derived their power over those who placed themselves, voluntarily or not, under their protection; elements of the Munt survived in the guardianship of widows and orphans.

Various forms of advocacy (Vogtei) also grew out of lordship over persons. Advocates represented unmarried and widowed women before the courts, and married women in their husbands' absence; seigneurial advocates exercised protective and judicial authority over the people under them; Kastvögte were entrusted with the protection of ecclesiastical institutions over whose familia they held jurisdiction; and the imperial advocate (Reichsvogt) represented the lordship in parts of the Empire. Whatever the particularities of the office, the advocate was always charged with protecting the innocent and surrendering or punishing the guilty, which gave the noble advocate the coercive power to summon his people to court and to require dues from them.

== Landed and judicial rights ==
Many seigneurial rights were tied to landed lordship, such as peasant tenure with its transfer tax (Ehrschatz; French lods), but above all Twing und Bann (the lord's power of command and coercion within the village and judicial district). Low justice—the competence to judge minor offenses punishable by fines, and civil cases concerning real property and debts—was originally linked to landed lordship. But since such rights were divisible, low justice often passed into other hands, giving rise to local judicial lordship.

Other rights attached to landed and judicial lordship could likewise be divided among different holders, and are recorded from the 14th century onward in manorial customals (Offnungen) and tenure laws. They included water rights (for irrigation or motive power), the licensing and taxation of seigneurial monopolies (taverns, mills, presses, and the like), corvées, fees for the use of forest (such as acherum) and common land, and the redemption of stray livestock and captured swarms of bees, as well as the fines and other revenues of low justice. Despite their protests, landed and judicial lords were deprived of a growing share of their rights, first by territorial lordship in the 15th century, and then under the Ancien Régime by the state, which gradually took control of common lands, forests, riverbanks and watercourses, and the licensing of monopolies.

== Rights over serfs ==
Some late-medieval seigneurial rights were survivals of earlier serfdom. Originally the lord inherited all the movable property of a deceased serf; later this was reduced to a share, the Fall, a charge on the tenure regardless of the personal free or unfree status of the peasant who worked it. Other rights linked to serfdom were transformed into taxes: bondage to the soil (with the lord's right to pursue fugitive serfs) gave way to a levy on wealth upon departure (the right of detraction), and the prohibition on women marrying outside the lordship (Ehegenossame) could be lifted on payment of a tax. The abolition of serfdom began in the 15th century under pressure from territorial lords, who could draw services (taxes, levies, military service) only from free men; rights and poll taxes burdening persons were therefore converted into annual rents on tenures or redeemed by a single payment.

== Rights over towns ==
The lord of a town held an authority over people and land that was the origin of rights over the farmsteads (Hofstatt) made available to townspeople. In return, the burghers had to pay rents and taxes, mount guard, perform military service, and carry out corvées for the upkeep of the town fortifications. Outburghers (Ausbürger) domiciled outside the town maintained their citizenship by paying a tax called Udel in German-speaking Switzerland. During the late-medieval communal movement, towns gradually took over from their lords not only judicial, fiscal, and military sovereignty but also rights over markets, customs, weights and measures, safe conduct, and coinage. Municipal rights are known from texts of the 12th and 13th centuries.

== Rights over parishes ==
Arising from the rights recognized to the landed lord who owned a proprietary church, the right of patronage could be held in either ecclesiastical or lay hands, as property or as a fief. It entailed the protection and upkeep of a parish church or the preservation of its benefice, as well as the right to appoint a incumbent, to dismiss him, and to grant him the associated benefice. The lord levied the tithe, including on newly cleared land (novalia), which amounted to a tax on the entire agricultural production of a parish. The first fruits (the first produce of the land and the first animals born of the herd) went to the beneficed cleric or his vicar.

== From noble to territorial lordship ==
The great noble lordships of the late Middle Ages stood at the top of the seigneurial pyramid; like the lordships of Twing und Bann, they rested on the possession of a fief or an allod. The higher judicial offices were exercised by the nobility, in some cases with the title of landgrave. The landgrave was a judge charged with prosecuting ex officio the offenses that endangered the public peace, and from the 14th century he also heard capital cases ("blood justice") in his own regional courts; he had the right to convene diets within his district. His office allowed him to profit from highly lucrative regalian rights (the confiscated property of banished or executed criminals, the inheritance of illegitimate persons and foreigners, ownerless property, and rights over forest, hunting, fishing, tolls, safe conduct, mines, and salt works). According to the sources, however, the landgrave possessed no power of a "state" nature—no sovereign authority in military or fiscal matters, and no right to cartage services.

From the 15th century, most high-justice rights and landgraviates passed, through pledging, purchase, or conquest, to towns, which soon began to build up their territorial lordships on the basis of the rights thus acquired, generally respecting the small original spatial structures. They later introduced military obligations, cartage services, and taxes—though without legitimate title—which led to conflicts such as the Twingherrenstreit in Bern.

== The oath ==
Every lord could require the periodic swearing of an oath in which subjects acknowledged the lord's rights and the duties that followed from them. This obligation was an indispensable moral means of pressure for the exercise of any power at a time when policing was scarcely effective. The subjects' oath introduced by the territorial authorities in the 16th and 17th centuries perpetuated this old usage (homage).

== Transformation into state monopolies ==
As precursors of the modern state, the territorial authorities had already begun, in the closing period of the Middle Ages, to dismantle the semi-state regime of lordship and to replace seigneurial rights with state monopolies in the fields of defense, administration, justice, customs, and taxation. The French invasion of 1798 accelerated the process. The Helvetic Republic issued the first laws abolishing the "feudal rights" (4 May and 10 November 1798). After 1803 the cantons—first in Latin Switzerland, then in German-speaking Switzerland—continued to abolish the taxes and obligations regarded as feudal charges. The former beneficiaries were rarely compensated. The tithe survived longest, in fact until it became possible to dispense with taxes in kind.

== Bibliography ==
- Deutsches Rechtswörterbuch, 5, 871

=== Sources ===
- Sammlung Schweizerischer Rechtsquellen (SSRQ)
