= Freedom of domicile in Switzerland =

Right to settle anywhere in Switzerland

Freedom of domicile (German: Niederlassungsfreiheit; French: liberté d'établissement; Italian: libertà di domicilio) in Switzerland is guaranteed by Article 24 of the Federal Constitution of 1999 as the right of every person with Swiss citizenship to settle anywhere in the country, to leave Switzerland and to enter it. The municipalities record the movements of the population (arrivals and departures) through their residents' registration offices.

== History ==
Under the ancien régime there was no right to choose one's domicile freely: residence in a community was subject to a permit granted by the authorities (right of departure). As a rule, the right of domicile and the exercise of full political rights were a hereditary privilege reserved for the descendants of the long-established inhabitants of a place. The right of domicile could also be acquired, but in the course of the 17th and 18th centuries the communities limited the admission of new members and raised the barriers to entry. Different classes of citizens thus formed, especially in the towns and in the larger communities.

Historically, the demand for the free movement of persons was closely linked to the demands for freedom of trade and industry. Freedom of domicile within the nation-state was an achievement of the French Revolution; in Switzerland it was introduced for the first time under the Helvetic Republic (1798–1803). The Helvetic Constitution of 1798 abolished all distinctions of birth (Article 8) and introduced Swiss citizenship (Article 19). Freedom of domicile was thus granted to all adult Swiss citizens, with the exception of Jews. With the Act of Mediation of 1803, the achievements of 1798 were largely undone: the matter returned to the competence of the cantons, which often restored the old restrictions and the distinctions between full citizens and Hintersassen (residents without full citizenship rights).

After 1815 the legal system largely restored the regulations in force under the ancien régime. In 1819 only 13 cantons, which had signed a concordat to that effect, recognized freedom of domicile on their territory for Swiss citizens, provided that they were able to support themselves. The other cantons did not join the concordat, mainly because they feared that their (Catholic) confessional unity might be compromised, or for fear of being obliged to support the poor. This attitude brought economic disadvantages to the cantons outside the concordat, which introduced more or less severe restrictions on domicile: craftsmen and industrialists, most of them Protestants, chose other places for their activity.

Caricature from the Nebelspalter, 1875, no. 27: "Since the adoption of the citizenship article, the settled resident of the laudable city of Zurich leaves much more self-confidently than before." On 27 June 1875 the voters of the canton of Zurich had approved, by a majority of 38 votes, a proposal allowing cantonal and Swiss citizens to acquire the citizenship of their municipality of residence after ten years without paying a fee.

With the founding of the new federal state in 1848, freedom of domicile became a central issue of legislative reform. Despite some opposition, persons of Christian faith from other cantons were placed on a practically equal footing with the inhabitants of their canton of residence (Article 41 of the Federal Constitution of 1848). The restrictions on Jews remained in force until 1866. The cantons often obstructed the practical application of freedom of domicile, and the disputes frequently required the intervention of the Federal Supreme Court. Freedom of domicile was extended by the Federal Constitution of 1874 and again in 1891, when Swiss citizens who had moved from other municipalities obtained political rights at the municipal level as well. In 1975 the last restrictions on freedom of domicile fell.

=== Foreign nationals ===
Under the Helvetic Republic, freedom of domicile for foreigners depended on the presentation of a certificate of origin (Heimatschein) and a certificate of good conduct. After 1803 it was generally regulated by bilateral treaties between foreign states and the cantons. The first was the treaty with France (1803), followed by others (with Bavaria in 1822); in some cases only part of the cantons signed them (with Sardinia and France in 1827). After 1848, the Confederation concluded treaties with numerous countries, in particular with its neighbors (France in 1864, Italy in 1868, Austria in 1875 and Germany in 1876). Their nationals were granted freedom of domicile without many formalities, except for German nationals, who had to present a certificate of good conduct.

The outbreak of World War I brought a limitation of freedom of movement: from 1914, the immigration of foreigners was regulated according to economic and political criteria. Following a federal decree of 1925 that gave the Confederation the power to legislate on foreigners (Article 69ter of the 1874 Federal Constitution; Article 121 of the 1999 Federal Constitution), a federal law on the residence and settlement of foreigners (Bundesgesetz über Aufenthalt und Niederlassung der Ausländer) was passed in 1931 with the aim of adapting migration flows to the needs of the economy. Foreigners were divided into clearly distinct categories. Cross-border commuters had their domicile abroad, while seasonal workers (a status abolished with the bilateral agreements of 2000 with the European Union) and holders of a residence permit (permit B) or a short-term residence permit (permit L) had permits that did not allow them to change canton. Settled foreigners, on the other hand, had the right to change canton if there was an agreement with their home country.

Around the turn of the 21st century, the debate on freedom of domicile largely shifted from the national to the supranational level, after the European Union had in principle achieved freedom of domicile within its territory. The rights of European Union citizens to settle and work in Switzerland, and vice versa, were expanded under the Bilateral Agreements I, in force since 2002 and extended to Eastern European countries in 2005, but they remain a controversial political issue. Asylum seekers, by contrast, do not have freedom of domicile.

== Bibliography ==
- E. Rüegg, Niederlassungsfreiheit, 1958
- H. C. Peyer, Verfassungsgeschichte der alten Schweiz, 1978
- R. Braun, Das ausgehende Ancien Régime in der Schweiz, 1984
- A. Kölz, Neuere schweizerische Verfassungsgeschichte, 2 vols., 1992
- P. Garrone, La libre circulation des personnes: liberté de mouvement, égalité, liberté économique, 1993
- Y. Hangartner, A. Kley, Die demokratischen Rechte in Bund und Kantonen der Schweizerischen Eidgenossenschaft, 2000
- G. Arlettaz, S. Arlettaz, La Suisse et les étrangers: immigration et formation nationale (1848–1933), 2004
- S. Arlettaz, Citoyens et étrangers sous la République helvétique (1798–1803), 2005
