= Pannage =

Method of raising pigs

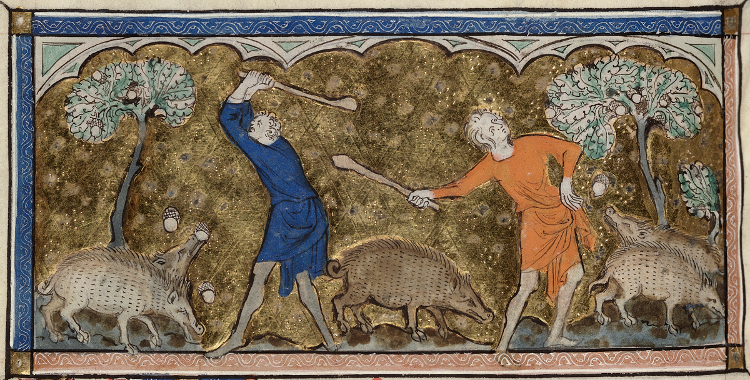
Men knocking down acorns to feed swine, from the 14th century English Queen Mary Psalter, MS. Royal 2 B VII f.81v

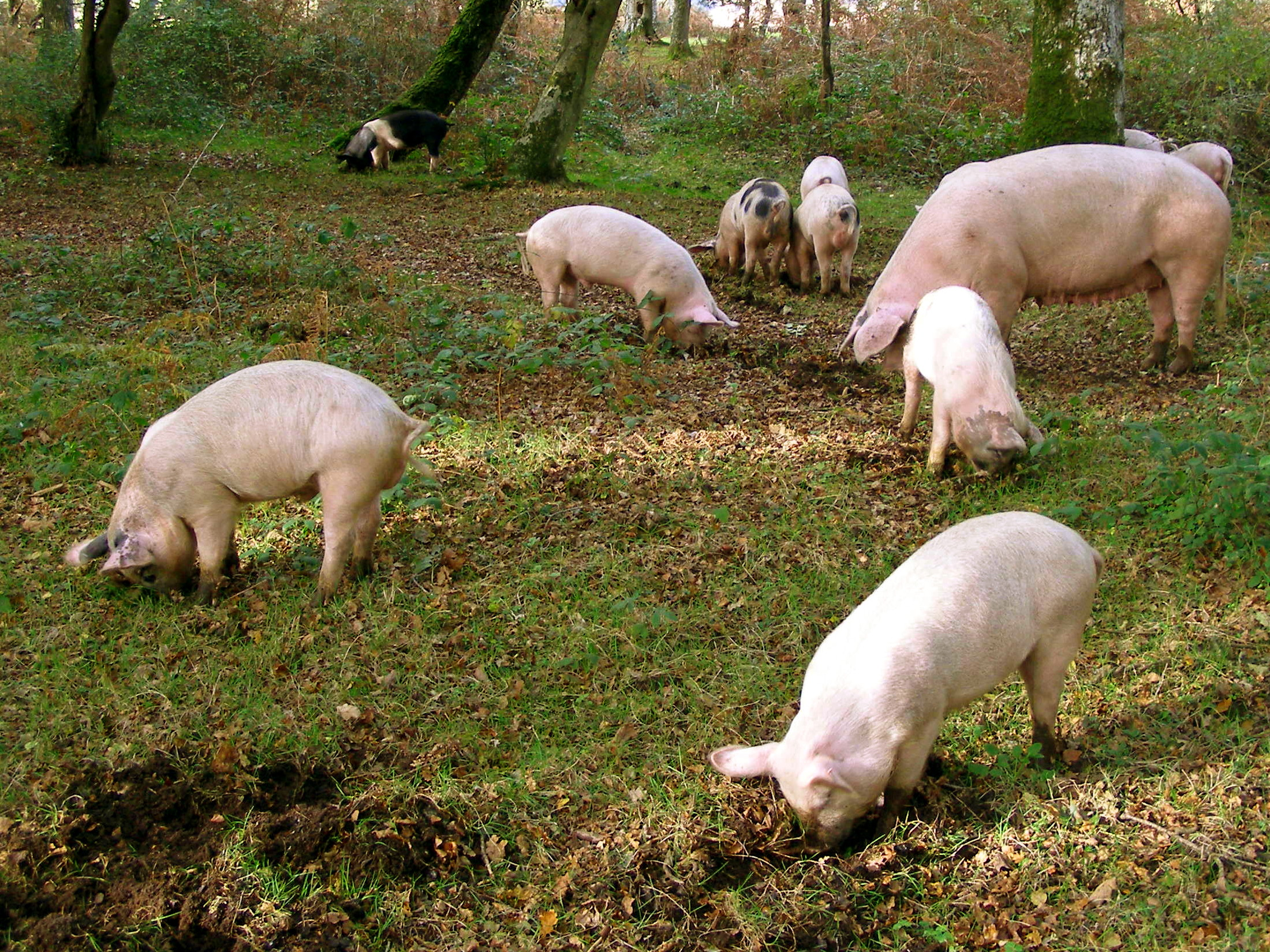
Modern-day pannage, or common of mast, in the New Forest

Pannage is the practice of releasing livestock-pigs in a forest, so that they can feed on fallen acorns, beechmast, chestnuts or other nuts. Historically, it was a right or privilege granted to local people on common land or in royal forests across much of Europe. The practice was historically referred to as Eichelmast or Eckerich in German-speaking Europe, and Montado in Portugal. The fee to feed one's livestock in such a way was historically referred to as žirovina in Croatia and Slovenia, and жиренье (žirenje) in Serbia, Bosnia and Montenegro.

== Background ==
Pannage had two useful purposes in the Middle Ages. While rooting around looking for nuts, pigs also turned the soil and broke it. Pig-rooting prevented soil compaction and released nutrients for plant growth. It also fattened pigs for slaughter.

Especially in the eastern shires of England, pannage was so prominent a value in the economic importance of woodland that it was often employed, as in Domesday Book (1086), as a measurement. Customarily, a pig was given to the lord of the manor for every certain number of pigs loosed de herbagio, as the right of pannage was entered. Edward Hasted quotes the Domesday Survey details for Norton in Kent. "Wood for the pannage of forty hogs".

Pannage is no longer carried out in most areas, but is still observed in the New Forest of Southern England, where it is also known as common of mast. It is still an important part of the forest ecology, and helps the husbandry of the other New Forest livestock – pigs can safely eat acorns as a large part of their diet, whereas excessive amounts may be poisonous to ponies and cattle.

The minimum duration of the New Forest pannage season is 60 days, but the start date varies according to the weather – and when the acorns fall. The Court of Verderers decides when pannage will start each year. During other times, pigs are not allowed to roam the forest, with the exception that breeding sows (known as "privileged sows") are by custom allowed out, providing that they return to the owner's holding at night and are not a nuisance. The pigs each have several nose rings clipped into their noses to prevent them rooting too much and causing damage to grassland.

=== Switzerland ===
In Switzerland, pannage had regional names: Acherum (Achram, Ächert) on the Swiss Plateau, Ackerum (Äckert, Eckert) in northern Switzerland, glandage in western Switzerland and escatico in southern Switzerland. The terms denoted the forest's yield of beechnuts and, above all, acorns used to fatten pigs, as well as the pigs' forest pasture, the locality, and the right of use. Unlike other uses of the lord's forest (wood, pasture), pannage was granted to the peasants separately by the landlord, in return for a rent mainly in money, oats or fodder oats, and sometimes only in fruitful years. The village's own pigs were admitted in proportion to the size of the farm, and pigs from outside (Lohnschweine) only against a special payment.

== See also ==
- Mast seeding
