= Heriot in Switzerland =

Seigneurial death duty in Switzerland

In Switzerland, heriot (German: Fall or Todfall) was a levy that the heirs of a deceased tenant farmer owed to the landlord, in the form of a fixed share of the estate (feudal dues; landed lordship). The German word Fall derives from Middle High German val ("fall", "ruin", "death"). Depending on the region, heriot had other German names, such as Leibfall or Sterbfall; Latin legal language uses the term mortuarium. French- and Italian-speaking Switzerland knew it as mainmorte (droit de mainmorte) and manomorta (diritto di manomorta) respectively, not to be confused with the biens de mainmorte and beni di manomorta (mortmain). As a rule, heriot concerned the most valuable items of movable property.

Various German compounds with Fall have nothing to do with heriot. The terms Lehenfall, Mannfall and Herrenfall, used in legal-historical literature, and the term Heimfall, found in the sources, refer to feudal law and the law of tenure. The Fallrechte are creations of legal language, for example case law (judge-made law, as opposed to statute law) and the ius caducionis (the rule applying in inheritance law when there are no descendants).

== Origin and forms ==
Heriot appears from the 13th century onward among the charges owed by the serfs (Eigenleute; serfdom) belonging to the familia of a landed lordship. It was the remnant of the lord's originally full right to inherit the estate of serfs. This full right of inheritance remained in use until the 15th century, and in isolated cases until the 18th century, as mainmorte in western Switzerland and as Lass east of the Reuss–Napf line. Heriot concerned only what actually belonged to serfs, namely their movable property. Their heirs of the body, by contrast, were entirely excluded from inheriting the land held in tenure (Leihegut).

Under the pressure of plague and of the flight of peasants from the land, the landlord's right to inherit from serfs was reduced to heriot, in the form of a contractually fixed share of the estate. The heirs of the body, whose position also improved at the end of the Middle Ages thanks to hereditary tenure (Erbleihe), thus kept a share of the movable property. Heriot, however, remained a personal charge and an attribute of personal dependence. What it comprised in detail differed between lordships and regions, but it always concerned the most valuable movable property. In a peasant household this included the large livestock, the personal arms (armor, weapons), the Sunday or holiday clothes, the bed and the household utensils. The best head of large livestock (Besthaupt) was demanded from tenant farmers. If there was no livestock, the lord claimed the best garment (Bestgewand, Gürtelgewand), which was generally taken from deceased women, or else the man's arms (armor and/or weapon), which always went to the lord when there were no male heirs of the body.

The forms of heriot in northeastern Switzerland differed from those described above, which were widespread throughout Switzerland. There the dues were more varied and, as on the right bank of the Rhine in southern and central Germany, mostly higher and often cumulative: the best garment was often demanded along with the best beast, and the Lass in addition to heriot. Whereas the lord's claim under heriot concerned only single items, under the Lass it extended to all the movable property or a fixed part of it (one or two thirds, half, and so on). Fäll und Gläss meant the entire estate.

In the area between Lake Zurich and Lake Constance, the best bed (Bestbett) was also demanded, but not the armor due (Harnischfall) where arms counted as immovable property (for example in the bailiwick of Grüningen). In Appenzellerland, the best beast was demanded in the case of sons, and in the case of daughters the best garment as well. Women gave the garment due (Gewandfall) if their daughters or sons had received their marriage portion, and nothing or only their workday dress if the children were minors. Where siblings shared a household, the eldest was liable for heriot. The lord claimed all the movable property from the childless and the unmarried, and large shares (half to two-thirds) from childless men survived by a widow and from men in an Ungenossenehe. Serfs holding fixed-term tenures (Handlehen or Schupflehen) gave less, for example the second-best beast (Zweitbesthaupt). In eastern Switzerland, heriot was also levied on Halbvieh (livestock held in common ownership).

Heriot was always paid by the heirs of the deceased and, in the case of subtenancy (Unterleihe), by the tenants of record (Träger), not by the lessees (Pächter). Payment was due, among other dates, on the day of burial, eight days later for those living elsewhere, and at the latest when the farm passed to the heirs. Heriot was usually not delivered but collected. When it was taken in kind, the lord's representative selected the best beast; if the animal was brought to him and there was fraud, he was entitled both to the inferior animal offered and to the best one that had been withheld. Most often, however, the lordship collected heriot in money, according to its estimated value. Those who had moved away were "pursued", and heriot was collected at their new place of residence.

Common terms and forms relating to heriot (Todfall)
Term	Meaning	Synonyms
Fall	General term that does not name the item customary in the locality	Todfall, Leibfall; Leibeigenenfall (eastern Switzerland); Sterbfall (right bank of the Rhine)
der Lass	The lord's full or partial right to inherit movable property (eastern Switzerland)	das Geläss, Leiblass, (Erb und) Erbschaft
Fäll und Gläss	Right to inherit the entire estate	
mainmorte, manomorta	Right to inherit the entire estate in French- and Italian-speaking Switzerland respectively	
mortuarium	Latin term for Fall	
Besthaupt	Best head of large livestock (cattle, horse)	Hauptfall
Zweitbesthaupt	Second-best head of livestock (for fixed-term tenure)	
Hauptfall	Most valuable item where several Fälle were due	Besthaupt
Bestgewand	Best garment, from women and from tenant farmers without livestock	Bestkleid, Gürtelgewand, Festgewand, Gewandfall; Hässfall (eastern Switzerland); Gerade (right bank of the Rhine)
Harnischfall	Armor, sometimes with weapon and best garment, where there were no male heirs of the body or no livestock	Heergewäte, Heergeräte (right bank of the Rhine)
Bestbett	Best bed, with or without bedding, from widows or from women in general	Bettfall

== Development ==
When rural inhabitants, too, became able to buy themselves out of serfdom for money, the character of heriot changed. The buyouts, which began in the Prealps and the Alps at the end of the 13th century, had varying effects. In the county of Gruyère, for example, the mainmorte continued to exist as the lord's right of inheritance and made second buyouts necessary, as in Saanen in 1312 and 1397. In the course of buyouts, but increasingly also independently of them, personal charges were transferred to the peasant tenure as charges on the land (Reallasten). Heriot thus became a tax in money or in kind attached to the farm, which now fell without distinction on everyone who held any tenure: peasants, Tauner, home workers and artisans, free and unfree. This almost universal liability to heriot, especially on the Swiss Plateau, is documented by manorial laws (Hofrechte), customals (Offnungen), land registers (Urbare), and tenure and heriot rolls (Leihe- and Fallrödel).

As a result, heriot lost its original meaning and became a kind of inheritance tax: west of the Reuss–Napf line as early as the 15th century, and east of it, in the territory of Zürich, in the 16th century. As with other taxes, there was resistance to heriot. Its abolition was demanded again and again during rural unrest, and in some cases it was redeemed as a result. It was not uncommon for items to be withheld; heriot was therefore given preferential treatment in bankruptcy law as an endangered seigneurial income.

In the monastic lordship of St. Gallen, the lord's claim to heriot hardened: although the prince-abbot renounced the garment due and the Lass in 1451, heriot in the form of the best beast remained a personal charge. From the end of the 15th century, the prince-abbey systematically extended the serfs' heriot (Leibeigenenfall) to all its subjects. In eastern Switzerland this resulted in the double burden of the serfs' heriot, owed to the judicial lords, and the protection heriot (Schirmfall), owed to the territorial lords (the Confederates and the prince-abbot). Since there was no substitute for the best beast, heriot fell on livestock owners and left non-peasant subjects untaxed. It was now also levied on the living, on prebendaries (Pfründner) and on those who moved away.

After 1760, the population pressed for the abolition of heriot where it was still levied. While Zürich consulted its communes in 1768 about a possible abolition but in the end changed nothing, buyouts took place in the Bernese Oberaargau in 1792 and in the monastic lordship of St. Gallen in 1795 and 1796. The Helvetic Republic abolished heriot definitively (abolition of feudal rights, law of 4 May 1798). From 1803 the cantons introduced the modern inheritance tax.

== Bibliography ==
- W. Müller, Die Abgaben von Todes wegen in der Fürstabtei St. Gallen, 1961
- D. Anex, Le servage au Pays de Vaud (XIII^{e}–XVI^{e} siècle), 1973
- P. A. von Segesser, Rechtsgeschichte der Stadt und Republik Luzern, 4 vols., 2nd ed., 1973
- Handwörterbuch zur deutschen Rechtsgeschichte, 1, 397–398; 2, 29–30, 1790; 4, 1964
- T. Weibel, Erbrecht, Gerichtswesen und Leibeigenschaft in der Landvogtei Grüningen, 1987
- J.-F. Poudret, Coutumes et coutumiers, 2, 1998, 469–534
- N. Morard, "Le sort des ruraux attirés par les villes: mainmorte et liberté réelle à Fribourg (Suisse) (XIII^{e}–XIV^{e} siècle)", in Mémoires de la Société pour l'histoire du droit et des institutions des anciens pays bourguignons, comtois et romands, 63, 2006, 141–179

=== Sources ===
- Collection of Swiss Law Sources (SSRQ/SDS)
