= Concordat (disambiguation) =

Concordat may refer to:

- Concordat (Holy See), an agreement between the Holy See and a national government
- Intercantonal concordats, treaties between Swiss cantons creating unified public law
- Memorandum of understanding, especially between the central UK government and the devolved Scottish and Welsh administrations
- Concordat of 1801, the reconciliation between Napoleon and the Catholic Church
- Concordat of 2002 between the national government of Georgia and the Georgian Orthodox Church
- The Concordat, in Funny Farm (webcomic), the name of a secret society
