= History of social assistance in Switzerland =

Historical development of welfare in Switzerland

The history of social assistance in Switzerland traces the evolution of support provided to people in need affected by poverty from the Middle Ages to the present day. Various actors, including the Church, the State, and private individuals, have historically provided and currently administer this assistance. In Switzerland, assistance has been organized at the municipal level but has followed similar principles across all localities and cantons since the Middle Ages. Unlike private aid, public assistance designates benefits regulated by law.

Since the 1960s, the term "social assistance" has been adopted to describe this system.

== Middle Ages ==
During the Middle Ages, assistance was the responsibility of the Church. From the beginning, bishops were responsible for the poor of their diocese, and the first hospitals were episcopal creations before becoming foundations of religious orders. They benefited from bequests from the faithful who chose to have food or money distributed on the day of their burial or on the anniversary of their death. Beggars, the sick, abandoned children, poor women in childbirth, girls without dowries, and the elderly unable to work were the main recipients of assistance provided by hospices and confraternities. The final centuries of the Middle Ages saw the emergence of municipal charity: cities created their own hospitals and paid lawyers for the poor (for example in Vevey).

Medieval assistance was based on a positive vision of the poor as an image of Christ. Poverty was an eminent virtue that provided both the rich and the poor with opportunities for sanctification—through alms for the former and through humility for the latter. Consequently, any individual in need, whoever they were, had the right to alms distributed by churches and private charity, and charitable institutions received both "good" and "bad" poor indiscriminately. A new current, dating back to the late Middle Ages, considered poverty as a curse and the "bad" poor as useless or even dangerous to society, because they were wandering, idle, and ignorant of the norms and precepts of the Christian religion. This current would dominate assistance practices from the 16th century onward.

== Early modern period ==
The changes that society underwent in the 16th century fundamentally transformed assistance and the attitude of secular power toward the destitute. Three main factors were at the origin of the first systematic attempts to develop a state assistance policy: population growth not accompanied by sufficient economic growth, the conjunctural and structural precariousness of employment that contributed to increased wandering by large groups of the population in search of work, and the role of the Protestant Reformation in valuing work as opposed to the virtues of contemplation advocated in the Middle Ages. The public assistance policy implemented from the 16th century was based on three elements that would endure until the early 20th century: the care of the poor person by the community to which they belonged by virtue of their right of origin, the establishment of exclusion criteria for assistance, and the effort to centralize aid offered by public authorities, which also aimed to replace private charity given directly and therefore without selection criteria.

In 1551, the Federal Diet decided that the maintenance of the poor should henceforth be assumed by the municipalities and parishes (Catholic and Protestant Kirchgemeinden) of which they were citizens. This measure derived from the principle of cantonal responsibility for assistance, admitted at the 1491 Diet. The delegation to municipalities, which also resulted from the modest financial means of the central power, was not original: it was inspired by English and French approaches that insisted on the necessity for each city, village, or parish to provide for its own poor. It aimed to assist them where their needs were known, but also to restrict their movements and keep them where their surveillance was facilitated. This conception would only slowly impose itself on all of Switzerland, and the chronological gap between cities and countryside is evident. As long as the pressure on municipal resources was not too strong, aid was granted according to the needs of applicants. For lack of means, it was sometimes only in the 18th century that a poor fund was created in rural communities, financed by bequests, fines, and interest on loans placed with well-off villagers. It was also in the 17th and 18th centuries, with the increase in the number of assisted persons, that the obligation for families to care for the poor, sometimes up to the fourth degree of kinship, was instituted—an obligation that would become universal in all cantons.

The 1681 Diet adopted a second principle, that of returning to their commune of origin the poor who wandered and begged outside their canton and those who, according to the commune of residence, were insufficiently assisted by their commune of origin. In the first case, the return could affect very large numbers; thus, the non-sedentary and homeless were estimated at nearly 10% the population of the Canton of Lucerne in the mid-18th century, hence the organization of numerous "beggar hunts" and the transport of beggars by cartloads beyond cantonal borders.

The role assigned to the commune of origin also explains the success of discriminatory practices toward disadvantaged social categories until the adoption of the 1874 Constitution, and the use of means deemed capable of achieving two objectives: as few poor as possible, and aid at the lowest cost. Hence the policy of certain cantons aimed at prohibiting marriage for the poorest to stem the number of potential recipients, hence the obstacles to internal mobility, and then the encouragement, in the 19th century, of emigration overseas.

Cities had, until the 19th century, resources far superior to those of the rural world to assist their poor; in the 18th century, the amount that Geneva devoted to this per inhabitant was four times higher than that of Glarus, which explains the enormous influx of country dwellers to the city in periods of conjunctural and structural difficulties. The proportion of those who received aid amounted to nearly 10% of the population in normal times but, in periods of crisis, could rise to 50% or more. Despite itself, the city was a refuge; but, unlike the Middle Ages, the reception, from the 17th century, was often limited to a casual distribution of resources and hospitality for one or two nights. In the 17th century, some municipalities imposed on foreign poor the obligation to swear not to return, with perjury being severely punished.

The attraction exerted by the city is also explained by the variety of forms of assistance practiced there: in addition to hospital institutions, there were, for example, charity funds, organized according to the origin of those they supported (French Fund, Italian Fund, or German Fund in Geneva), and guild boxes.

Most legislation specified that children, widows with children, and the elderly should be assisted as a priority, without this resulting in a right. But the high number of those who, for lack of employment, should have been assisted led very early to the creation of new exclusion criteria, with age, disability, or misfortune no longer being sufficient to justify aid. Thus the notion of work became paramount. The "bad" poor, who preferred idleness and begging to work and who abused public commiseration, had to be disciplined, hence the establishment, from the 17th century, of repressive institutions. Only the "true," that is, the "good" poor, deserved assistance. From the 18th century, a new criterion intervened: attitude toward work. It was no longer enough to work; one had to love work and live with order and decency.

The more systematic organization of assistance policy made it possible to distribute aid appropriately. The forms were numerous but, faced with needs, they remained inadequate until the 20th century. The possibilities of institutional accommodation were limited: they never exceeded a quarter of permanent urban indigents until the 19th century. As for home assistance, which was largely in the majority, it ranged from salary supplements to the placement of children and the elderly, which continued until the early 20th century, including the distribution of aid in kind or in money, financing of spa treatments or the purchase of medicines, payment of a doctor's fees, or even the payment of a dowry.

== 19th and 20th centuries ==
=== Organization and principles ===
In the 19th century, people in need were cared for primarily by relatives, the Church, foundations, private funds, associations, and mutual aid societies. Public assistance only filled the gaps. From a subsidiary role, the role of assistance (called social assistance from the 1960s) evolved during the 20th century to constitute the last safety net in the expanding welfare state. Private institutions and organizations continued to play an important role, even if they increasingly depended on public subsidies. At the same time, the public aid offering was enriched, addressing particularly children and young people, people with disabilities, mothers, and people with drug dependencies.

Public assistance remains to this day under the jurisdiction of the cantons. The Confederation, for its part, limited itself to subsidizing certain sectors of social assistance (alcohol tithe, support for the elderly and people with disabilities). Political initiatives aimed at establishing framework legislation at the federal level remained a dead letter. In the 19th century, public assistance was progressively regulated and unified in the cantons, even if premodern traditions persisted in legislation and practice. Thus, until the following century, aid to the poor was mainly the responsibility of communes of origin, bourgeoisies, and assistance communes. The practice of returning people in need to their commune of origin persisted. The notion of individual responsibility, characteristic of a liberal conception of the state, perpetuated a moralizing vision of poverty dating back to the early modern period and favored the adoption of repressive measures to combat this phenomenon.

=== Eligibility and restrictions ===
The persistence of a premodern vision that opposed "true" poor and those judged "guilty" of their situation meant that only the former could benefit from public assistance. Among them were children, the sick, people with disabilities, as well as single women and widows (more exposed to the risk of poverty without the support of their family or a husband providing for their maintenance). Able-bodied persons were forced to work or pushed to emigrate. Foreign nationals in need could be denied residence. The nature and extent of assistance were determined by strategies aimed at limiting costs (respectively tax burdens) and preserving social balances. Depending on municipal finances and the social status of the destitute, they were placed in asylums or other institutions of confinement (closed assistance) or obtained aid in kind or in cash (open assistance). Large families and single mothers regularly faced child removal by the authorities. Children were then "rented" to families or institutions that exploited their labor.

Until late in the 20th century, the granting of public aid went hand in hand with a restriction of the rights of beneficiaries (marriage impediments, tavern bans, deprivation of voting and eligibility rights). Described as depraved, poor people who begged, opposed the authorities, or neglected their obligations were exposed to sanctions. They could be interned without judicial decision in forced labor establishments for disciplinary purposes (administrative detention). The authorities and society accommodated the fact that these repressive measures aggravated the marginalization of people affected by poverty.

=== Commune of origin and reform ===
The care of the poor by the commune of origin constituted a brake on freedom of establishment and led to an unequal distribution of burdens between localities. Increasingly incompatible with the growing mobility of the population at the turn of the 20th century, it also hindered the integration of the people concerned in their place of residence and work. If 59% of Swiss people lived in their commune of origin in 1860, only 34% still lived there in 1910. The question of the residence of assistance, which influenced debates on social policy until late in the 20th century, was at the origin of the first harmonizations at the national level in the social assistance sector. The Conference of Institutions for Assistance to the Poor (founded in 1905; Swiss Conference of Public Assistance Institutions, CSIAP, from 1966; Swiss Conference of Social Assistance Institutions, CSIAS, from 1996) and the French-speaking section of the latter, the Groupement des institutions d'assistance de la Suisse romande (founded in 1922; Association romande et tessinoise des institutions d'action sociale, Artias, from 1995), were the driving force of this movement.

Around 1890, the first cantons moved from assistance linked to the commune of origin to that relating to the place of residence (Neuchâtel in 1889, Bern in 1897). In the wake of the social tensions that marked World War I and the end of this conflict (social inequality, general strike), a concordat solution was developed in the 1920s, to which all cantons adhered by 1967. With few exceptions, assistance was provided by the canton of residence, while the canton of origin participated in the costs. In 1977, the federal law on jurisdiction regarding assistance to people in need replaced the concordat. From the 1950s, the directives of the Swiss Conference of Welfare Organisations contributed to harmonizing public assistance, causing an adjustment of (increasing) benefits in the various cantons.

=== Professionalization and expansion ===
During the first third of the 20th century, and more particularly during the 1930s crisis, the urgency of the social question led to the recognition of situations of precariousness linked to the economic situation and the introduction of sociopolitical measures aimed at combating and destigmatizing unemployment, perceived as a cause of poverty. After World War II, social insurance (old-age and survivors' insurance, AHV/AVS 1948; disability insurance, IV/AI, 1960; supplementary benefits, 1965) cushioned other causes of poverty. At a time characterized by full employment and growing prosperity, social assistance was intended to protect people in distress who, for personal reasons, had fallen through the cracks of the welfare state's safety net.

Over the long term, this transformation was accompanied by bureaucratization and professionalization of assistance, encouraged by progressive governments of cities such as Zürich and Lausanne, professional associations (e.g., Conference of Institutions for Assistance to the Poor, Caritas in the Catholic milieu), and training establishments (e.g., social schools for women). From the 1910s, differentiated administrations replaced, in cities first, older types of voluntary aid. Their level of professionalization was long superior to that of rural communes. At the same time, middle-class women, particularly those who had obtained a diploma from the new social schools, assumed as social workers new tasks in public aid offices, but also in the private sector. The systematization of assistance (home visits, file management) aimed to combat the personal causes of poverty and ensure closer collaboration with guardianship authorities and other bodies. The rationalization of aid to the poor had as its flip side the tighter control of individuals and families in precarious situations. Conformist pressure intensified particularly during the interwar period, leading to an increase in sanctions and coercive measures.

Local social services, providing advice, developed after World War II, also in cities and cantons of more modest size. Influenced by the international debate on social work methods and by new constitutional norms (principle of proportionality), new approaches, focused on individualization, medicalization, and therapy, replaced from the 1960s the paternalistic conception of assistance. Cantons that had revised their social assistance legislation focused on participatory individual support (social casework) as well as counseling while reducing closed assistance and coercive measures. At the same time, some cities, then the CSIAP, increased their benefits to cover the minimum subsistence level and allow adequate participation in social life, but while maintaining the obligation to reimburse the sums received. The granting of emergency aid was recognized as a constitutional right by the Federal Tribunal in 1995, then inscribed in the Federal Constitution in 1999.

=== Contemporary developments ===
The number of social assistance beneficiaries declined for decades, then stagnated at a low level before increasing again during the 1990s. At the same time, new categories of people in need appeared. These included a growing number of people working (full-time or part-time) and especially women and children from single-parent households, which once again demonstrates the influence of gender and age on the distribution of poverty risks. Among these "new poor" were also unemployed people at the end of their benefits, as well as poorly qualified people or immigrants with only a weak family and social network. At the same time, the amount of assistance benefits granted was criticized by bourgeois right-wing circles. The cantons and CSIAS reacted with a revision of directives (2005), the reduction of basic needs taken into account to guarantee the minimum subsistence level, a strengthening of incentive measures (integration supplement), and a tightening of sanctions (reduction of benefits). These measures aimed to motivate people in need to engage in paid work. At the turn of the 21st century, this restrictive approach was also reflected in the interconnection of social and migration policies. Social benefits granted to asylum seekers or refugees admitted provisionally (social assistance in asylum matters) were reduced, those granted to rejected persons were limited in 2004 to emergency aid, and the requirements for naturalization (citizenship rights) of social assistance beneficiaries were tightened. The legal framework allowing the withdrawal of residence permits from nationals of third countries or the refusal of family reunification was also expanded. The use of social assistance was then perceived as an indicator of a lack of willingness regarding integration.

== See also ==
- Social security in Switzerland
- Poverty in Switzerland
