= Tauner =

Class of smallholding peasants in early modern Switzerland

The Tauner were smallholding peasants in Swiss rural society who owned only a small plot of land. They generally kept a few goats but, unlike the full peasants (Bauern), often had no draft animals, and they performed the feudal labor services and communal tasks required of them with a hoe.

== Terminology and origins ==
The term derives from tagwan (a day's earnings) or tagwen (the area a corvée laborer could work in a day). In the sources, the word Tauner is applied either to people who did not own enough land to ensure their subsistence and were therefore obliged to hire themselves out as day laborers, or to people who, lacking draft animals, had only their hands with which to fulfill the labor obligations imposed by the lord or the community (in the medieval manorial economy). In the early modern period, Tauner commonly designated a group of smallholders in a village who had no plough and lived by hiring themselves out as day laborers. By definition, they were found only where possession of the means of production used for ploughing constituted a socioeconomic criterion—that is, in regions of open-field arable farming.

The Tauner emerged as a social group in the course of the differentiation of rural society in the late Middle Ages, under the effect of the reduction of feudal dues. In the early modern period, demographic growth increased the proportion of smallholders, more markedly in villages practicing crop rotation and partible inheritance (which led to progressive fragmentation of the land) than in areas of dispersed settlement and convertible husbandry.

In the early modern period, the Tauner, who had little or no land and were therefore limited in their agricultural activities, belonged to the lowest stratum of the peasant population. They generally had no wealth, no trade, no political position, no education, and no reputation, so that for the historian they are often hard to distinguish from the non-peasant groups of the lower classes in pre-industrial rural society. This blurring is reinforced by the fact that the use of the term varied regionally, and that the minimum area allowing a household (five to six people) to subsist depended on local natural conditions—three to four hectares of fields and meadows on the grain lands of the Plateau, and substantially more in zones combining grassland and cereals.

== Economic position ==
The Tauner usually farmed less than one hectare: a few fields and meadows, a kitchen garden, land temporarily reclaimed from the commons, and, on the Plateau, a strip of vineyard. They raised small livestock (goats, sheep), poultry, and at most one cow. They depended on additional income, which they earned in the least esteemed trades of the rural craft economy, in domestic work, and above all as agricultural laborers. From the end of the seventeenth century, many of them practiced home work within the framework of proto-industrialization (textile industry, straw plaiting). These various activities were just enough to support a household in normal times, but they did not allow it to build up reserves to face periods of crisis, which quickly translated into hunger, illness, and destitution.

For the Tauner, economic survival depended heavily on the possibility of grazing the few animals they raised on the common land (pastures and forests). In the early modern period, the use of these goods was more strictly regulated, since the increase in population brought about a shortage. This led to frequent conflicts between Tauner and ploughmen, the latter claiming rights of use proportional to their holdings (land and heads of livestock) at the expense of the Tauner. The Tauner were rarely excluded from the commons altogether, but their rights were generally curtailed (grazing limited to a few plots or to marginal areas such as riverbanks). In times of crisis, the commune allowed them to clear communal land temporarily. There they cultivated cereals, vegetables, and, from the second half of the eighteenth century, potatoes. The vaine pâture on fallow and harvested fields was also a source of quarrels between Tauner and ploughmen. The summer sowing of fallow and the enclosure of fields reduced the opportunities for common grazing, chiefly to the detriment of the Tauner.

In the early modern period, ploughmen and Tauner depended on one another in many ways, despite the frequent and sometimes long-running conflicts over rights of use that set them at odds. The former needed the latter for certain seasonal tasks (sowing, harvesting). But the Tauner were under a still stronger necessity to borrow animals, ploughs, and carts from the ploughmen in order to work their plots and bring in their harvest. In times of crisis, they had to ask them for help or loans, which increased their dependence. These ties only began to loosen with the development of proto-industry in the countryside; but then the rural lower classes fell under the yoke of urban merchant-entrepreneurs (putting-out system).

== Political position ==
Unlike the resident non-citizens (Hintersassen), the Tauner held the status of commoner (Gemeindebürger). But since the right to take part in the village assembly and to vote was often tied to the enjoyment of rights of use, the actual ability to influence the life of the commune depended on how those rights were allocated. It was severely reduced where rights were not personal (attached to the person) but real (attached to property—land, house, or livestock), especially in matters relating to those rights. Almost nowhere could the Tauner reach the prominent communal offices (such as bailiff's lieutenant, Ammann, or treasurer), which were monopolized by the village elites until the end of the Ancien Régime.

When the communes, from the end of the seventeenth century, began to concern themselves with poverty reduction and ceased to be mere communities of users, the proportionally ever smaller group of those with rights began to confer responsibilities on the Tauner, who were thus drawn into local affairs (they also gained access to posts as judges and assessors in the lower courts), but remained economically disadvantaged. The term Tauner lost its legal meaning in the first half of the nineteenth century, after the dissolution of the village user communities and the division of the rights of common grazing and woodland use. It also faded as the designation of a social category, because villagers with little or no land increasingly secured their income either by working at home for the export industry or in factories in the industrialized regions.

== Bibliography ==
- E. Eichholzer, "Über die Stellung der Tauner nach den Rechtsquellen des Kantons Zürich", in Zeitschrift der Savigny-Stiftung für Rechtsgeschichte, Germanistische Abteilung, 38, 1917, 115–129.
- M. Mattmüller, "Bauern und Tauner im schweizerischen Kornland um 1700", in Folklore suisse, 70, 1980, 49–64.
- U. Pfister, Die Zürcher Fabriques, 1992, especially 289–290.
- A. Schnyder-Burghartz, Alltag und Lebensformen auf der Basler Landschaft um 1700, 1992.
- Geschichte des Kantons Zürich, 1, 284–289, 408–413; 2, 88–93.
- A. Ineichen, Innovative Bauern, 1996, 63, 71, 138–143.
