= Rhaetian polyptych =

Carolingian register for Rhaetia

The Rhaetian Polyptych (German: Churrätisches Reichsgutsurbar; French: polyptyque rhétique) is a Carolingian register of the property and rights of the Empire in Rhaetia, compiled around 840 and preserved only in part through Aegidius Tschudi. It is one of the few surviving Carolingian property and revenue registers and an important source for the history of the region.

The document lists the property (churches, fisc or royal domain, and fiefs with their main dependencies) and rights (royal cens, toll and mining revenues) of the Empire in Rhaetia, organized by ministerium. A polyptych of Pfäfers Abbey is inserted into it. Linguistic and historical arguments place its composition around 840, and it was probably a descriptio drawn up in view of the partition of the Empire by the Treaty of Verdun in 843. The polyptych is a major source for the general and regional history of institutions, the Church, the economy, transport and settlement, as well as for toponymic research, since it provides the earliest mention of many place names.

== Bibliography ==
- Clavadetscher, O.P., "Zum churrätischen Reichsgutsurbar aus der Karolingerzeit", in RHS, 30, 1950, pp. 161–197.
- Clavadetscher, O.P., "Das churrätische Reichsgutsurbar als Quelle zur Geschichte des Vertrags von Verdun", in ZRG GA, 70, 1953, pp. 1–63.
- Clavadetscher, O.P., "Nochmals zum churrätischen Reichsgutsurbar aus der Mitte des 9. Jahrhunderts", in ZRG GA, 76, 1959, pp. 319–328.
