= Vaine pâture =

Pre-modern grazing right on stubble and fallow

Vaine pâture (German: Trattrecht; Italian: diritto di libero pascolo) was a right of use, widespread under various regional names before the agricultural modernization of the eighteenth and nineteenth centuries, that allowed the members of a peasant community to graze their livestock on all the fallow fields, the stubble, and—in autumn, and sometimes in spring—the mown meadows of a village territory.

German sources often mention it together with the right of passage in alliterative formulas such as tritt und tratt ("passage and pasture") or trieb und tratt ("driving of livestock and pasture"). In the Grisons it survived until recent times for small livestock, under the name Gemeinatzung in German and compascolo in Italian.

== Bibliography ==
- Schweizerisches Idiotikon, 6, 305.
- J. M. Curschellas, Die Gemeinatzung, 1926.
