= Immigration policy of Switzerland =

The immigration policy of Switzerland consists of the laws, regulations, and administrative procedures that govern the entry and residence of foreign nationals in the Swiss Confederation. Shaped by Switzerland's unique geopolitical position—surrounded by European Union (EU) member states but not itself a member—the country's immigration policies have evolved through direct democracy mechanisms, bilateral agreements with the EU, and domestic political debates over the social and economic impacts of migration. Despite not being an EU member, Switzerland is a Schengen member.

== Overview ==
Switzerland has one of the highest proportions of foreign residents in Europe, with immigrants playing a significant role in the nation's economy, cultural life, and society. The country's policy framework balances a demand for foreign labour—particularly in specialized sectors such as banking, healthcare, and technology—with concerns regarding integration, social services, and preserving Swiss cultural values. Switzerland's distinct system of direct democracy often leads to referendums that shape migration policies, reflecting varying public opinions toward immigration.

== Historical Background ==
=== Early Immigration ===
Switzerland's mountainous geography and lack of natural resources historically led the Swiss to seek economic opportunities abroad. While some immigrants did settle in the region, the influx of significant migrant groups to Switzerland began primarily in the late 19th century, coinciding with industrialization. Cross-border workers from neighbouring countries—especially Italy and France—formed a large portion of the early immigrant workforce in areas such as construction, manufacturing, and railways.

=== Post-World War II Era ===
After World War II, Switzerland experienced an economic boom that fuelled a demand for labour. Agreement-based recruitment programs with southern European countries, particularly Italy, Spain, and Portugal, facilitated the arrival of thousands of “guest workers.” During this period, Switzerland's immigration laws centred on seasonal or temporary labour, limiting foreign workers’ long-term settlement options.

After having signed the 1951 Refugee Convention, Switzerland admitted thousands of refugees fleeing Eastern Bloc countries, with approximately 12000 admitted from Hungary within a few months at the end of 1956 and beginning of 1957.

=== Late 20th Century to Early 21st Century ===
From the 1970s onward, concerns about overpopulation, job competition, and cultural integration prompted political initiatives to limit immigration. Several referendums were held, some aiming to set strict caps on foreign residents. Although many of these initiatives were rejected by voters, they generated heightened public discourse on controlling immigration.

By the late 1990s and early 2000s, the Swiss government pursued bilateral agreements with the EU, culminating in accords that introduced the free movement of persons for EU and European Free Trade Association (EFTA) nationals. This policy allows EU/EFTA citizens to live and work in Switzerland more freely, substantially shaping modern Swiss immigration trends.

== Legal Framework ==
=== Federal Constitution and Legislation ===
Switzerland's Federal Constitution provides the foundation for federal laws regulating immigration. Swiss citizenship, residence permits, and work authorizations are governed by federal acts such as the Foreign Nationals and Integration Act (FNIA) (German: Ausländer- und Integrationsgesetz), which details the conditions for entry, residence, and family reunification.

=== Role of the State Secretariat for Migration ===
The State Secretariat for Migration (SEM) oversees immigration matters at the federal level, including asylum procedures, the issuance of residence permits, and naturalization policies. It coordinates with cantonal authorities, which hold significant administrative responsibility for implementing federal rules. It was formed as a consequence of the 2005 merger of the Federal Office for Refugees (FOR) and Federal Office for Immigration, Integration and Emigration (IMES).

=== Bilateral Agreements with the EU ===
Under the Agreement on the Free Movement of Persons with the EU, Swiss authorities grant EU/EFTA citizens streamlined admission, residence, and employment rights. However, protective clauses allow Switzerland to enact temporary quotas for certain EU/EFTA nationals if immigration surpasses specific thresholds. Moreover, this freedom of movement excludes EU/EFTA citizens having rights to any form of Swiss welfare benefits after immigration, unless they have been residents for years.

== Categories of Immigrants ==
=== EU/EFTA Nationals ===
- EU/EFTA citizens have the right to live and/or work in Switzerland if they meet certain conditions:
  - Employment: They have a job offer, are self-employed, or can provably support themselves financially.
  - Health Insurance: They have comprehensive health coverage.
  - Compliance with Swiss Standards: If employed, their employment terms and wages meet Swiss standards. Once employed, they receive a residence permit.

Citizens of EU/EFTA states are required to register with the local authorities of the municipality where they reside within 14 days of arriving in Switzerland and before starting employment. At the same time, they must apply for a residence permit. To complete registration, they need to present a valid passport or ID along with written confirmation of employment—such as a contract specifying the duration of the position and the expected working hours.

Individuals such as pensioners, students, or those of private means who wish to reside in Switzerland without pursuing gainful employment must register with the local authorities in their municipality of residence and apply for a residence permit for non-working persons. This registration must be completed within 14 days of arrival. The permit is granted if applicants can demonstrate sufficient financial resources for themselves and any family members, ensuring they will not need to rely on Swiss social security benefits.

==== Job Registration Requirement ====
In 2014, Swiss voters approved a referendum aimed at curbing immigration. In response, Parliament opted to require mandatory public posting of open, unfilled jobs in sectors with elevated unemployment rates, with the goal of making fuller use of the domestic labour pool.

==== Cross border commuters ====
Cross-border commuters are EU/EFTA nationals who live in an EU/EFTA state but work in Switzerland as employees or self-employed individuals with a Switzerland-based company. They are required to return to their main residence abroad at least once a week. However, they may stay in Switzerland during the workweek, provided they register with the local authorities in the municipality where they reside, just as Swiss citizens do. Cross-border permits are issued by the authorities in the canton where the individual works. There are no border-zone restrictions for EU/EFTA nationals; they are free to choose any EU/EFTA country as their place of residence and are permitted to work in any part of Switzerland.

=== Non-EU/EFTA Nationals (“Third Country” Nationals) ===
- Subject to stricter quotas and requirements
- Typically must have specialized skills or fill labour shortages
- Residence and work permits are often tied to specific employers
- Since 1 January 2021, UK nationals are no longer citizens of the EU and are therefore subject to the same rules that apply to third-country nationals, including quotas. However, the two countries negotiated an agreement ensuring that rights of UK citizens acquired under the Free Movement of Persons Agreement (FMOPA) with the EU, including residence, employment, and social security benefits would stay intact for those who applied for them before Brexit was finalized. The agreement also facilitates the mutual recognition of professional qualifications for four years after the UK's exit from the EU.

Individuals from non-EU/EFTA states who wish to work in Switzerland may do so only if they are qualified, meaning they must hold a managerial, specialist, or similarly skilled position. In practice, this typically requires a university or higher-education degree, along with several years of professional experience. Those intending to remain in Switzerland for multiple years must also meet additional criteria that support long-term professional and social integration. Key factors include professional adaptability, social adaptability, language proficiency, and age.

Before hiring a non-EU/EFTA national, the employer must demonstrate that no suitable candidate from Switzerland or an EU/EFTA state is available for the position. Furthermore, the salary, social security contributions, and employment terms for foreign workers must comply with customary standards in the relevant Swiss region, profession, and sector.

=== Asylum Seekers and Refugees ===
- Seek protection under the 1951 Refugee Convention and Swiss asylum law
- Applications handled by the State Secretariat for Migration
- Successful applicants receive refugee status or provisional admission

=== Students and Researchers ===
- Can apply for residence permits tied to recognized educational institutions
- Often must demonstrate sufficient financial support and intent to leave upon completion of studies (unless hired for work)
