= Manorialism in Switzerland =

Manorial system in Swiss history

Manorialism in Switzerland (German: Grundherrschaft; French: seigneurie foncière; Italian: signoria fondiaria) was the land-based seigneurial system that organized rural society on the territory of present-day Switzerland from the early Middle Ages until the end of the Ancien Régime. It combined a lord's direct ownership of land with various rights over the persons settled on it, and developed under markedly different conditions across the German-, French- and Italian-speaking regions of the country.

== Concept ==
The notion of manorial lordship is a modern historiographical term, difficult to define precisely and subject to debate. It primarily denotes a lord's authority over the people settled on his lands, emphasizing landed property as the basis of domination while setting aside other factors—personal, judicial or ecclesiastical dependencies—that could likewise give rise to such power. German historiography uses Grundherrschaft (attested in isolated instances from the 15th century onwards) in a fairly broad sense, while French- and Italian-speaking historians more sharply distinguish seigneurie foncière or signoria fondiaria from other forms of rural lordship. In medieval sources, contemporaries normally used the general terms dominium, herschaft or seignorie, or referred to specific partial rights such as the ban, and to entities such as the great domain or villa, whose legal organization became recognizable in the High Middle Ages through the customary law of tenants.

Historians see manorial lordship as the core of feudal society. It gained importance from the late early Middle Ages onward, before being overlaid and displaced by other systems of domination, in particular territorial lordship. It combined the lord's direct dominion (dominium directum) over the soil with rights exercised over the dependants and tenants who worked it: the ban, lower justice, corvée labor, dues and personal dependence. The land was generally granted to tenants in the legal form of tenure, as farms, hides, Schupposen, or craft and industrial establishments. Over the long term, the early medieval manorial regime gave way in the late Middle Ages and early modern period to two distinct functions: a framework for collecting land rent through cens and other dues, and a spatially delimited lower jurisdiction. Its final remnants, the feudal dues themselves, disappeared only in the 19th century.

== German-speaking Switzerland ==
=== The classical manorial regime of the early Middle Ages ===
Evidence of estates of varying sizes, and of peasants owing dues or labor services to ecclesiastical or lay lords, appears in German-speaking Switzerland from the 8th century onward, as written records become more numerous. The largest such corpus comes from the Abbey of Saint Gall. Its sources show such a variety of property and rights titles, social groups, and relations of power and dependence that the boundary between mere landholding and manorial lordship is hard to draw. Equally hard is distinguishing manorial lordship from tithe, judicial or personal lordship, from domestic serfdom, or from the bonds between protector and protected and between lord and tenant. Since the sources offer no clearly differentiated terms, any definition that does not simply apply the label to every form of early medieval domination remains uncertain.

Legal and constitutional historians focus on the juridical character of the villae of the king, the nobility or the Church. Their main interest is the emergence of the law of tenants as a distinct juridical sphere, separate from the jurisdiction of the king and the counts. This process is visible almost exclusively in the sources of ecclesiastical lordships; at Saint Gall, it was completed only in the 10th or 11th century. Within this framework a layer of dependants emerged, differentiated by their rights and functions, alongside a group of ministeriales who acted as intermediaries between the dependants and the lord. How deeply the peasant population of German-speaking Switzerland was integrated into this system, and how many free peasants still held their allods in the classical Middle Ages, both remain unclear.

Economic and social historians look instead at the forms of agricultural exploitation typical of early medieval manorialism, and at the power and dependence relations attached to them. A central question is the classical, bipartite manorial regime (villication), whose main elements are already visible in the earliest Saint Gall documents. On one side stood the seigneurial reserve: the manorial court and the lands worked through corvées under a steward (Meier). On the other lay the hides and tenures of the useful domain, worked by dependent peasants who paid various dues and sometimes also performed corvée labor.

According to a common view, this organization of property, economy and power only spread within the Frankish kingdom from the 7th century onward, driven by the kings and the Church. The great villae mentioned in royal donation charters and in the Rhaetian polyptych (likely produced by the royal administration of the 9th century) in fact display such structures from an early date. In Rhaetia, which remained Romance-speaking for a long time, this raises the question whether the organization commonly attributed to the Franks did not also descend from structures of the Late Empire—from the colonate system and the estate organization of late antiquity.

In many regions, including the alpine zones of central Switzerland, the classical manorial regime struggled to survive beyond the early Middle Ages. Even at its height it was only one agrarian form among several, alongside free peasant exploitation, large estates worked by servile labor rather than tenants, and systems of pure dues without corvée. Still visible in the registers of recognitions of the 11th, 12th and 13th centuries, the regime receded across the classical Middle Ages at rates that varied by region.

=== Late medieval and early modern manorialism ===
Manorialism was profoundly transformed during the central Middle Ages. New towns competed with lords for inhabitants, and many peasants used the opportunity to leave the seigneurial familia by becoming outburghers. The growing market economy also placed pressure on the classical regime. Many lords responded by abandoning the reserve, or sharply reducing it; they turned it into new farms, or divided it among their dependent tenants. Others leased the main farm to a single peasant who, as Meier, collected cens, sat at the local court and otherwise shared in running the seigneurie. Corvées were rapidly replaced by cens, and lords increasingly drew their income from land rent. The development of villages reinforced this shift: in most cases, villages grouped the lands of several seigneuries into a single legal and economic association, weakening the lord's hold over peasants who had previously been isolated.

The sharp demographic decline and the agrarian crisis of the 14th and 15th centuries weakened many lords, who struggled to find cultivators for their estates. In the Confederacy, attempts to revive serfdom and bind peasants to the soil failed. The cantons, now territorial lords in their own right, stripped seigneurs of much of their authority, especially in justice. Institutions limiting the freedom of movement of rural inhabitants—the Nachjagerecht (right of pursuit) and the prohibitions on marriage outside one's seigneury (Ungenossame, formariage)—disappear from the sources by the end of the Middle Ages. Mortmain, where it survived, became an inheritance tax. In many places tenure, originally granted for a limited time, became hereditary.

Where a lord managed to combine rights over the land, rights over its people and the power to render justice within a clearly defined territory, he remained a powerful figure: the chapter of Beromünster in the Michelsamt is one such example. A few—including the abbot of Saint Gall and the bishop of Basel—went further still, acquiring noble lordships and pressing their rights to the full to build states that survived until the Helvetic Republic.

The secularization of Church property after the Reformation strengthened the secular authorities but did not fundamentally challenge the manorial regime, even in Reformed territories. In early modern German-speaking Switzerland, hereditary tenure increasingly became a kind of peasant quasi-ownership, though it remained subject to land cens and other dues until the abolition of "feudal rights". Peasants sold, divided or mortgaged seigneurial property despite the authorities' prohibitions. By the end of the Ancien Régime, manorial lordship scarcely existed in the proper sense: its original seigneurial functions, such as the protection of those who worked the soil, had long since passed to the modern state. Seigneurial rights had become mere privileges enjoyed by the Church and parts of the authorities and propertied classes, without any corresponding obligation.

== French-speaking Switzerland ==
The origins of manorial lordship in French-speaking Switzerland are hard to study for lack of sources, especially its hypothetical continuity with the agrarian domains of the Carolingian and Rudolphian periods. The documentation of the Cluniac priory of Romainmôtier nonetheless reveals the main features of the regime in the 11th century. The priory held the ban—a right of public origin—over people tied to land it owned. To assert itself against the peasants and its neighbors, it drew on the support of the knights serving lay lords nearby, or on the servants of its own monastic familia. The seigneurie was probably made up of tenures and a directly exploited reserve. The latter is still recalled today by the toponym Condémine, common in French-speaking Switzerland.

In the 12th century, the seigneuries of newly established ecclesiastical orders—the Cistercians, Carthusians and Premonstratensians—remained small. These orders enjoyed only limited seigneurial rights and, at least at the outset, worked their lands directly through conversi distributed among their various granges.

From the mid-13th century, richer and more varied sources (extents, account books) allow seigneurial structures to be grasped more precisely, especially those of the lay seigneuries. The Savoyard seigneuries of Lower Valais, Chablais and the Pays de Vaud (Rue and Romont, in the present canton of Fribourg) show the traditional distinction between tenures and reserve (endominium). In French-speaking Switzerland, the reserve often included vineyards cultivated under the direct responsibility of the lord or his representative, as in the Savoyard castellanies, the County of Neuchâtel and Prangins. Even so, the reserve tended to disappear and to be split into tenures, as at Palézieux (before 1337) or Belmont-sur-Yverdon (before the end of the 14th century). Corvées were often bought out, but they survived in Ajoie, where a particular form of manorial lordship, the cour colongère, held the tenants collectively responsible to the lord.

The diffusion and importance of manorial lordship varied considerably across periods and regions. On the Swiss Plateau around 1300, the regime visibly relaxed: corvées were bought out and those subject to the taille manumitted. At the same time, however, the bishop of Basel was establishing new seigneurial structures—though without a reserve—in the Franches-Montagnes. Elsewhere, seigneurial pressure was probably softened by the lord's absence from his estates, as in the Entremont.

In the late Middle Ages, the weakening of the ban power of ecclesiastical seigneuries cut into their revenues, while several lay seigneuries—Montagny FR, Cossonay—lost their autonomy as the families that had held them for several centuries declined. This reshuffling initially benefited the territorial princes (Savoy, Neuchâtel), but at the start of the 16th century it was the cities of Geneva, Fribourg and especially Bern that profited, thanks to the secularization of ecclesiastical temporalities and the departure of the Savoyards. Manorial lordship continued until the fall of the Ancien Régime, but by then it had lost most of its original features—the link between landed property and coercive power over the inhabitants of the land, and the physical proximity that had often existed between lord and dependent peasants.

== Italian-speaking Switzerland ==
In Italian-speaking Switzerland, the seigneuries attested for the early Middle Ages belonged to the Church and lay mainly in the Sottoceneri. The main lordships were those of the monasteries of Sant'Ambrogio in Milan and San Pietro in Ciel d'Oro in Pavia, and possibly of Sant'Abbondio and San Carpoforo in Como, the latter less well documented in the surviving record.

At the end of the 8th century, the Benedictine monastery of Sant'Ambrogio received an estate from the Lombard Toto of Campione. Centered at Campione, it also included holdings at Bissone (grouped into a curtis), Arogno, Melide, Maroggia, Melano, in the Mendrisiotto, and at Canobbio, Cadro and elsewhere. A monk, acting as vicar, resided at Campione, where the produce of those who cultivated the monastery's lands and owed corvée labor was collected. The cultivators were initially serfs of Toto, later free or semi-free men. The abbot of Sant'Ambrogio obtained full seigneurial rights over Campione step by step: through imperial protection in 873, the loss of the rights of the bishop of Como in the region in 874, and the immunity granted by the archbishop of Milan in 893. In the late Middle Ages, the abbot bore the title of count and was sole lord of Campione, holding the public authority there (honor et districtus) and exercising full jurisdiction over all its inhabitants; in the other localities he had jurisdiction only over the monastery's own dependants. The lordship of Sant'Ambrogio lasted until the end of the 18th century.

The case of San Pietro was similar in several respects. The monastery at Pavia had a curtis at Magliaso, from which it administered scattered properties, mostly in the Malcantone and the Luganese but also in the Sopraceneri. Despite holding full imperial immunity over its possessions, San Pietro was forced at the start of the 13th century to yield to pressure and sell a large part of its lands north of Monte Ceneri.

== Bibliography ==
General

- Schreiner, K., "'Grundherrschaft'", in Die Grundherrschaft im späten Mittelalter, ed. H. Patze, part 1, 1983, pp. 11–74.
- Duby, G., Hommes et structures du Moyen Âge, vol. 2: Seigneurs et paysans, 1988.
- Kuchenbuch, L., Grundherrschaft im früheren Mittelalter, 1991.
- Dilcher, G.; Violante, C. (eds.), Strukturen und Wandlungen der ländlichen Herrschaftsformen vom 10. zum 13. Jahrhundert: Deutschland und Italien im Vergleich, 2000 (Italian edition 1996).

German-speaking Switzerland

- Gilomen, H.-J., Die Grundherrschaft des Basler Cluniazenser-Priorates St. Alban im Mittelalter, 1977.
- Goetz, H.-W., "Beobachtungen zur Grundherrschaftsentwicklung der Abtei St. Gallen vom 8. zum 10. Jahrhundert", in Strukturen der Grundherrschaft im frühen Mittelalter, ed. W. Rösener, 1989, pp. 197–246.
- Köppel, C., Von der Äbtissin zu den gnädigen Herren, 1991.
- Zangger, A., Grundherrschaft und Bauern, 1991.

French-speaking Switzerland

- Paravicini Bagliani, A. et al. (eds.), Les pays romands au Moyen Âge, 1997, pp. 164–170, 315–331.
- Andenmatten, B., La maison de Savoie et la noblesse vaudoise (XIIIe–XIVe s.), 2005.

Italian-speaking Switzerland

- Schaefer, Sottocenere, especially pp. 35–52, 97–111.
- Vismara, G. et al., Ticino medievale, 1990, pp. 73–104.
