= Tithe in Switzerland =

The tithe (German: Zehnt; French: dîme; Latin: decima) in the territory of present-day Switzerland was originally a levy of one tenth of agricultural yields or income. Known in many cultures and mentioned in the Old and New Testaments, it was taken over by Christianity and, from the early Christian period, used chiefly for church income. The ecclesiastical tithe was a charge on all agricultural produce within a precisely defined tithe district, paid to a parish church entitled to receive it. From the Enlightenment onward the tithe was counted among the despised "feudal dues," and after a failed attempt under the Helvetic Republic it was abolished over the course of the 19th century, at different times in the different cantons.

The modern successor to the tithe is the church tax (Kirchensteuer). There is no national state church in Switzerland; under Article 72 of the Federal Constitution, the regulation of church–state relations is a matter for the cantons. Most cantons levy a church tax, collected through the tax system, on the registered members of the denominations they recognise under public law—typically the Roman Catholic Church, the Evangelical Reformed Church, and, in some cantons, the Christian Catholic (Old Catholic) Church and Jewish communities. Such recognition has generally not been extended to other faiths such as Islam or Buddhism. The tax falls only on church members: whether a member may decline it or must instead formally leave the church varies by canton, and it is voluntary in Ticino, Neuchâtel, and Geneva, while Vaud levies no church tax and meets church costs from general taxation.

== Middle Ages ==
=== Tithe in ecclesiastical and secular law ===
Several Church Fathers called on the faithful to pay a voluntary tithe, and from the 5th century the demand for such a payment, to maintain church infrastructure and for charitable purposes, grew stronger. Alongside synodal decrees, Carolingian legislation is regarded as the main basis for the spread of the tithe system in the Frankish kingdom. The Carolingian tithe obligation is difficult to interpret, since as early as the Early Middle Ages various dues were called decima: the church tithe in the narrow sense; the double tithe (decima et nona) paid as compensation by holders of enfeoffed church property; and the fiscal tithe on royal estates. Only the provisions of the Decretum Gratiani (around 1140) reveal a developed and roughly comprehensive tithe system of clearly bounded tithe districts, each attached to a baptismal or parish church, which marks the tithe as a return for pastoral care and the administration of the sacraments.

=== Beginnings in Switzerland ===
In the Alemannic northeast of Switzerland, where tithes appear from the 9th century in royal charters and Saint Gall documents, current scholarship places the emergence of a fixed parish and tithe organization independent of the manorial lordship no earlier than the 11th or 12th century; older references are held to be closely tied to manorial and royal estates. The tithe demand of Bishop Haito of Basel in the early 9th century, and his reduction of his share from a third to a quarter, may however point to an earlier (possibly pre-Carolingian) church tithe in this area, levied on all the faithful at the bishops' instigation.

For Raetia Curiensis, the Raetian estate register (around 840) attests a fairly dense network of churches entitled to tithes, sometimes covering several villages or a whole valley (Schams, Lugnez); these were probably true parish tithes. In Ticino, parishes with fixed districts (Pieve) are assumed to have existed since the 5th century and to have held binding tithe rights at least since Carolingian times, though early medieval evidence is lacking. The Burgundian western part of Switzerland offers indications of possible pre-Carolingian tithes, but only in later, problematic texts: the foundation charter of Saint-Maurice under King Sigismund (supposedly 515) and the Lausanne cartulary (13th century), according to which Bishop Marius of Avenches endowed the church of Payerne with decimae in 587; Marius did attend the Council of Mâcon, which two years earlier had made the tithe compulsory. The dating matters, because the appearance of the church tithe is often assigned a key role in the formation of parishes and even of villages.

=== Tithe and lordship ===
The system of proprietary churches (Eigenkirche), at the intersection of ecclesiastical and manorial power, led early to the secularization of tithe administration and use, despite attempts by the Church and the crown from Carolingian times to curb encroachments by lords and the holding of tithes by laymen. In the late Middle Ages, tithe rights and manorial lordship remained closely linked. By appropriating parish tithes, ecclesiastical and lay landlords could extend their seigneurial rights over free persons and their property; in Central Switzerland, for example, this was probably the main means of doing so. Sales, enfeoffments, pledges, forcible appropriations, and new creations shaped the development of tithes down to the 15th century.

Collection fell to the tithe lord and his officials, unless it was farmed out to third parties for a fixed sum or one varying from year to year. In the late Middle Ages, besides the ministerial nobility bound to the lords, the local clergy, and members of the village elite, wealthy townspeople increasingly took an interest in the various forms of tithe collection. The frequent fragmentation of these dues (on the lands of Saint-Maurice, sixths and eighths of a tithe are attested as early as the 13th century) was a source of conflict, but from the 15th century a countervailing concentration set in, so that the tithe contributed to the formation of territorial lordship. Examples from Central Switzerland also suggest that the varied tax systems of the confederate cantons may in part derive from former tithes.

=== Tithe and agriculture ===
The economic role of the tithe becomes visible only from the late Middle Ages, through the account books and lists of dues of the lordships, which show that tithes gained ground against other revenues from the 14th century. At the Fraumünster in Zürich, for example, they accounted for a third of all cereal income in the 15th century, and the priory of St. Alban in Basel raised its tithe revenues by 50 to 100 percent between the late 14th and early 16th century. This increase reflects a rise in agricultural production, but medievalists warn against drawing hasty conclusions: some sources record expected yields, others actual income; the rate was not always identical (the wine tithe, for example, was levied above the average rate in good years and below it in bad ones); and analysis is complicated by frequent changes in the ownership of both the liable land and the rights, by differing modes of collection, and by the fact that some tithes had a fixed value. Sharp drops, as at Rüti Abbey in the later 15th century, resulted from structural change (a shift to animal husbandry) rather than from late-medieval agrarian crises. Because part of the tithe was by then paid in money rather than in kind, a tithe type can no longer be taken in every case to correspond to an actual agricultural product.

Medieval tithes were highly varied. Even the original distinction between the great tithe (grain, wine) and the small tithe (garden produce, the increase of herds, hay) was not applied uniformly and is explained in different ways by historians. In the late Middle Ages the distinction was gradually refined by product: tithes of grain, wine, hay, young animals, cheese, and even flax, hemp, chestnuts, or honey. There were also tithes defined by the legal status of the land: novalia (on recently cleared land), fallow and common-land tithes, and lump-sum payments for isolated farms.

== Early modern period ==
=== Role ===
Inherited from the Middle Ages, the tithe persisted throughout the Ancien Régime and even grew in economic importance: because it was levied in proportion to the harvest, it followed the increase in grain production, whereas the traditionally fixed ground rents could scarcely be raised. For the peasants of the Swiss Plateau the tithe was the heaviest levy in kind, usually about 10 percent of the gross cereal yield (but only an eleventh, about 9 percent, in Vaud) and of other products varying by locality (wine, hay, fruit, more rarely the increase of herds).

The tithe also mattered greatly to its recipients. In the Protestant cantons, where the tithes had been secularized at the Reformation, they made up a considerable share of public revenue, all the more since the cantons normally levied no direct tax: more than 20 percent in Zürich at the end of the 18th century, and the leading source in Bern, where the state took the tithe on nearly three fifths of grain production, having acquired rights beyond those that fell to it at the Reformation. In a Catholic canton such as Lucerne, the state held only about 5 percent of the tithes at the same period and ecclesiastical institutions 90 percent, which limited the growth of the canton's activity; the monasteries there benefited from the rise in tithes (which doubled at Disentis in the 17th century), without which the many Baroque churches built around 1700 could not have been financed. The Alps and Prealps differed markedly from the Plateau, as tithes were often abolished there in the late Middle Ages: the "peasant communal movement" (Jon Mathieu) was stronger than on the Plateau, where urban authorities upheld the levy, and grain, the main tithed product, played a secondary role in the Alps. Similar differences appear in Ticino, where by the 18th century tithes had almost disappeared in the high valleys dominated by stock-raising, while the system survived, often to the benefit of the Bishop of Como, around Bellinzona, Lugano, and Mendrisio.

=== Contestation ===
The tithe's gravest shock came at the start of the early modern period, when peasants began to demand that it return to its original purpose, the maintenance of their parish priest, accusing the monasteries of having seized much of it. Although the monasteries disappeared in the lands that adopted the Reformation, the authorities of the Protestant city-cantons such as Bern and Zürich kept their tithes; this outcome, disappointing for their subjects, was imposed easily thanks to the close ties between political authority and Church (at Bern the catechism stressed the duty to pay rents and tithes). The great tithes thus remained due, in the same place, the only difference being that the receiver was now a state official rather than a cleric; the small tithes were variously retained, absorbed into the great tithes, or converted to a rent. The peasants of the Grisons fared better: the Ilanz Articles of 1526 abolished the small tithe, reduced the great tithe to a fifteenth, and made redemption possible under certain conditions. In the Catholic cantons almost all the monasteries fell into serious internal crisis, which hampered regular collection; the situation recovered only after the Council of Trent confirmed the universal character of the tithe and after the monasteries were reorganized in the course of the Catholic Reformation.

After the Reformation era and until near the end of the 18th century, the tithe—heavy but bearable because proportional to the harvest—was no longer fundamentally questioned; its antiquity and unambiguous passages of the Old Testament gave it a firm basis of legitimacy. It played only a secondary role in the demands raised during the peasant war of 1653, indirect taxes and higher fees and fines causing more discontent. In the later 18th century the physiocrats saw the system's drawbacks—it discouraged agricultural improvement by not exempting surplus production—but argued for its conversion into a fixed rent in kind rather than its abolition. With the introduction of new crops such as the potato and artificial meadows, tithe conflicts became more frequent and tended to become political once the Revolution had broken out in France: the arrest of Jean-Rodolphe Martin, pastor of Mézières, who in 1790 asked the Bernese bailiff to free his parish from the potato tithe, caused a considerable stir.

=== Courts, collection, and conflicts ===
Already in the late Middle Ages, urban authorities increasingly took tithe matters out of the hands of the ecclesiastical courts. In the early modern period such disputes fell to the secular courts, even in the Catholic cantons, and collection practices were similar in both confessions. Tithe lords, whether Protestant authorities or monasteries, generally auctioned the tithes; Muri Abbey did so as early as the 14th century. The successful bidders came mainly from the village elite, and their profit lay in the difference between the sum they paid the tithe owner and the value of what they actually collected.

Conflicts often arose over a change of cultivation, especially when a tenant wished to stop growing grain. Tithe lords favored grain, which was easy to store, market, and control, and suffered notable losses when land was turned over to fodder, vegetables, or, in the 18th century, potatoes. Under tithe law they could not prescribe a particular crop; only the malicious leaving of land uncultivated was forbidden. The authorities nonetheless tried, by invoking other rights, to enforce cereal cultivation: at Bern they appealed to feudal law, elsewhere to the rules of compulsory crop rotation. At Lucerne, from the late 16th century, peasants wishing to enclose a rotation field had to obtain the tithe holder's authorization, confirmed by the city council. The reservations often expressed reflected a fear—generally unjustified until the early 18th century—that grain-tithe revenue would fall.

=== The tithe and cereal production ===
For the agrarian history of the early modern period the tithe is of exceptional value, as it allows the quantitative development of grain production to be traced, provided it was levied on constant terms. Few series reach back to the 16th century, but the broad stages can be reconstructed from surveys and estate inventories, which often give the tithe's yield "in common years." The results for the Plateau are mixed: while Markus Mattmüller calculated an increase of only 16 percent between 1530/1579 and 1650/1689 from Basel, Bern, Vaud, and Zürich series, the canton of Lucerne shows long-term growth in grain production roughly parallel to population growth (tithe revenues in the commandery of Reiden, for example, rose 3.5-fold between 1529 and 1682). For Switzerland as a whole, tithe researchers have not yet explained how the fast-growing population secured its food supply in the long term, and given the divergent findings it is questionable whether tithe revenue is everywhere a reliable indicator of the agrarian economy. The picture is clearer for the end of the Ancien Régime: in the later 18th century tithe revenue generally declined or stagnated, as grain came under pressure both from the spread of the potato after 1750 and from a shift in the relative profitability of stock-raising between the 1740s and 1770s, which encouraged the conversion of arable to permanent or temporary grassland. From the late 18th century the yield of the great grain tithes can still be treated as an indicator of cereal production but no longer of agricultural development as a whole.

== Modern church tax ==
The modern successor to the ecclesiastical tithe is the church tax (German: Kirchensteuer; French: impôt ecclésiastique). There is no national state church in Switzerland; under Article 72 of the Federal Constitution, the regulation of the relationship between church and state is a matter for the cantons, and Article 15 guarantees freedom of religion and conscience.

Each canton recognises certain religious communities under public law and levies a church tax, collected through the ordinary tax system, on their registered members. The recognised bodies are usually the Roman Catholic Church and the Evangelical Reformed Church, and in a number of cantons also the Christian Catholic (Old Catholic) Church and the Jewish communities; the canton of Zürich, for example, recognises all four. Public-law recognition has generally not been extended to other faiths, such as Islam or Buddhism; a 2003 amendment to the constitution of Zürich that would have allowed the recognition and tax-levying by non-traditional communities was rejected by the canton's voters, and although some cantons (including Basel, Zürich, and Vaud) grant other communities a lesser recognition as private entities, this does not carry the right to levy a church tax.

The church tax falls only on registered members of the recognized communities; a person of no religious affiliation does not pay it. What varies by canton is whether a member may decline the tax while remaining in the church or must formally leave it, and whether the tax is compulsory at all: it is voluntary in Ticino, Neuchâtel, and Geneva, while the canton of Vaud levies no church tax and meets the cost of church services from general taxation. The tax is assessed as a proportion of the cantonal or income tax and varies by canton and denomination—in Bern, for example, it is about 20.7 per cent of the income tax for Catholics and 18.4 per cent for Protestants. In most cantons legal entities are also liable to the church tax—an obligation companies cannot escape by leaving a church—though several cantons, including Basel-Stadt, Schaffhausen, Appenzell Ausserrhoden, Aargau, and Geneva, exempt them; the taxation of companies has been politically contested, with cantons such as Bern and Zürich seeing initiatives to abolish it.

== Bibliography ==
- R. Gmür, Der Zehnt im alten Bern, 1954
- H.-J. Gilomen, Die Grundherrschaft des Basler Cluniazenser-Priorates Sankt Alban im Mittelalter, 1977
- M. Zufferey, Die Abtei Saint-Maurice d'Agaune im Hochmittelalter (830–1258), 1988
- A. Zangger, Grundherrschaft und Bauern, 1991
- S. Sonderegger, Landwirtschaftliche Entwicklung in der spätmittelalterlichen Nordostschweiz, 1994
- A.-L. Head, "Les fluctuations des rendements et du produit décimal céréaliers dans quelques régions du plateau suisse (1500–1800)", in Schweizerische Zeitschrift für Geschichte, 29, 1979, 575–604
- M. Mattmüller, Bevölkerungsgeschichte der Schweiz, part 1, vol. 1, 1987, 411–413
- J. Mathieu, Eine Agrargeschichte der inneren Alpen, 1992
- A. Ineichen, Innovative Bauern, 1996
- V. Pribnow, Die Rechtfertigung obrigkeitlicher Steuer- und kirchlicher Zehnterhebung bei Huldrich Zwingli, 1996
