= Right of departure in Switzerland =

Historical Swiss right to move away

The right of departure (German: Abzugsrecht; French: droit de détraction; Italian: diritto di migrazione; Latin: ius detractus) was the right to move away from one's place of residence. In the territory of present-day Switzerland, only a small part of the population had full freedom of movement, the unrestricted right to leave their place of residence, until the beginning of the 19th century.

== History ==
In the Early and High Middle Ages, only free people (Freie) had this right, while bondsmen (Hörige) in a landed lordship were bound to the soil. From the 12th century, landed lordship was transformed and the bond to the soil was loosened in favor of an intensified personal bond (late medieval serfdom), while the town, as a new way of life, began to attract personally dependent people. As a result, the right of departure changed fundamentally.

With the crisis of the late Middle Ages, a rural exodus (internal migration) began around the middle of the 14th century. The landlords and the lords of serfs, who had come under pressure, partly because of it, could do little to counter it. In contrast to Baden or Württemberg in southern Germany, for example, where the rulers responded to the migration by having their subjects swear oaths en masse, restrictions on departure were loosened in many places in the territory of present-day Switzerland. In the mid-14th century, for example, the members of the manorial community (Hofgenossen) of Malters received the right of free departure, as did the Gotteshausleute ("people of the house of God") of the abbey of St. Gallen, who nevertheless remained serfs (Eigenleute) until such time as they bought their freedom. By the 16th century, the right of departure had been reduced to an obligation to pay a levy, as a rule 5–10% of the property taken away.

In the course of the 16th and 17th centuries, various cantons of the Confederacy granted one another freedom of movement in agreements. Departure between the Catholic and the Reformed cantons nevertheless remained very difficult until the 17th century. The Helvetic Revolution of 1798 brought the end of all restrictions on departure in Switzerland (freedom of domicile). With respect to other countries, they were abolished in bilateral treaties by the middle of the 19th century.

== Bibliography ==
- K. Hauser, "Über den Abzug in der Schweiz", in Jahrbuch für schweizerische Geschichte, 34, 1909, 1–163
- K.-H. Spiess, "Zur Landflucht im Mittelalter", in Die Grundherrschaft im späten Mittelalter, 1, ed. H. Patze, 1983, 164–198
- Lexikon des Mittelalters, 4, 907–908
- P. Blickle, "Friede und Verfassung", in Innerschweiz und frühe Eidgenossenschaft, 1, 1990, 182–184
