= Ehegenossame =

Marriage agreements between lordships

In Switzerland, Ehegenossame (from German Ehe, "marriage", and Genossame, "community"; French: formariage) were contractual agreements between lordships (Herrschaften) in which they reciprocally granted their serfs freedom to marry. Within the area covered by an agreement, they lifted the restrictions on marriages between people of different legal status. Two overlapping treaty systems, one among seven and one among twelve and a half religious houses, were important for the territory of present-day Switzerland.

== Terminology ==
Medieval and early modern sources use the terms comparitas, concordia, consortium in contrahendo matrimonio, genossami or genoschaft, roub, and wechsel. In scholarship, the agreements are referred to as Eheerleichterungsabkommen (agreement to facilitate marriage), Eheraubrecht, Freizügigkeitsvertrag or Gegenseitigkeitsvertrag (treaty of free movement or of reciprocity), Heiratskartell or Heiratskonkordat (marriage cartel or concordat), Reziprozitätsvertrag (reciprocity treaty), and Unterzug.

== History ==
Ehegenossame were a consequence of the medieval order of bondage (Eigenverfassung; serfdom and landed lordship). This order depended on marriages being concluded within a group of serfs (Eigenleute), since such marriages ensured the continuity of the group and thus the existence of the lordship. When serfs married outside the group, concluding what were called ungenossame marriages, this endangered the group. Legal problems also arose, because each spouse was subject to a different law. The lordships therefore prohibited ungenossame marriages. On the other hand, because these marriages were concluded in church, they could not be declared invalid. The lordships tried to suppress them by punishing such marriages with penalties on property, or by forcing the spouse who married in to join the group of serfs.

As mobility increased in the late Middle Ages, ungenossame marriages became more frequent. At first the lordships reacted case by case. Eventually, abduction and exchange treaties (Raubverträge and Wechselverträge) were concluded; they were called abduction treaties because the woman was as a rule considered to have been "abducted". In the Alemannic region these treaties were called Ehegenossame. They developed from bilateral agreements into treaty systems with several, changing parties. Two unique, overlapping treaty systems were important for the territory of present-day Switzerland: that of the seven and that of the twelve and a half religious houses (Gotteshäuser). The first comprised Einsiedeln, Pfäfers, Reichenau, Säckingen, St. Gallen, Schänis, and the Fraumünster in Zurich; the text of this treaty has not survived. The treaty of the twelve and a half foundations (Stifte), by contrast, is known. Renewed in 1560, redrafted in 1589, and abolished in 1764, it bound Bischofszell, Fischingen, Ittingen, Konstanz (the cathedral provostry, the prince-bishopric, and St. Stephan), Kreuzlingen, Münsterlingen, Öhningen, Petershausen, Reichenau, St. Gallen, and Wagenhausen. These Ehegenossame allowed the serfs of these ecclesiastical lordships to marry within the territories bound by the treaty. Very early treaties concluded across language boundaries are known from western Switzerland, such as that of 1150 between the bishop of Basel and the prior of Romainmôtier, that of 1195 between the bishop of Lausanne and the count of Gruyère, and that of 1238 between the count and the cathedral chapter of Lausanne.

== Bibliography ==
- D. Anex, Le servage au Pays de Vaud, 1973, 161–179
- W. Müller, Entwicklung und Spätformen der Leibeigenschaft am Beispiel der Heiratsbeschränkungen, 1974
