= Intercantonal concordat =

Treaties between Swiss cantons creating unified public law

An intercantonal concordat (Note: German: Interkantonales Konkordat; French: Concordat intercantonal; Italian: Concordato intercantonale) or intercantonal agreement is a treaty between Swiss cantons that create unified public law and legal obligations. Due to Switzerland's federalist structure, these agreements have played a significant role in Swiss governance during the 19th and 20th centuries. The term "concordat" was adopted from religious agreements, as the first intercantonal treaty in 1803 dealt with confessional matters.

Today, concordats are authorized under Article 48 of the Swiss Federal Constitution and remain subject to federal law, though they have diminished in importance due to the expansion of federal legislation.

== History ==
=== Mediation period (1803–1848) ===
The Act of Mediation of 1803 marked the beginning of intercantonal concordats in Switzerland. Chapter XX of the act, which served as the federal constitution, contained Article 10 prohibiting "any alliance of one canton with another canton, or with a foreign power." Article 40 specified that "no right, regarding the internal regime of the cantons and their relationship between them, can be based on the former political state of Switzerland." These articles were designed to ensure a break with previous political and legal norms and exclude intercantonal conventions and treaties between cantons and foreign states.

However, Article 40 created a legal vacuum that soon became apparent in various regulations. Bern notably demanded the restoration of a previous convention signed with Solothurn, which regulated the confessional situation of the Protestant Bucheggberg. Faced with this dilemma, the Federal Diet decided to again accept intercantonal regulations. On 29 June 1803, it authorized the conclusion of "covenants" on confessional, civil, local, and police matters, provided that the Diet was informed each time.

The convention concerning the Bucheggberg was called a "concordat" due to its confessional character, and this name was thereafter given to intercantonal treaties. These were no longer regulated solely between the parties directly concerned, but within the framework of the Diet. They required a majority of delegates and were only valid for cantons that had accepted them. These concordats, which fell under federal law, represented "a curious mixture between treaty and law," as Gustav Vogt wrote.

The Federal Pact of 1815 allowed the continuation of the practice dating from the Mediation, with paragraph 6 only prohibiting the Confederation and the cantons from "prejudicial liaisons." It was the intercantonal concordats that, from 1815 to 1848, led to a new way of integrating cantons into the Confederation. Observers did not seem to realize that the numerous concordats were in fact expanding the Federal Pact. The latter was deliberately filled with an interweaving of agreements that were to "remedy, in a confederal spirit, the imperfection of the Pact, generally felt" (Gustav Vogt).

The membership of concordats in federal law was emphasized by the Diet's competences: if an absolute majority of 12 cantons adhered to a convention decided by a majority of cantons during a Diet session, said convention was considered a "federal concordat," which attributed to the Diet the competences of a federal authority. In this sense, the first sentence of paragraph 8 of the Pact stipulated that the Diet directed "the general affairs of the Confederation" that the sovereign cantons had entrusted to it.

A canton could not withdraw from a concordat on its own. According to a Diet decision of 25 July 1836, it needed the consent of the majority of cantons party to the agreement. If withdrawal was refused, the Diet had to decide on the follow-up to the request. Its acceptance could result in the canton that denounced the concordat paying damages to its partners.

=== After 1848 ===
The political institutions created by the federal state fundamentally derived from the Federal Pact and the concordats. The latter certainly lost importance with the promulgation of the Swiss Federal Constitution, but continued to be authorized (Article 7, paragraph 2 of the 1848 constitution and Article 48 of the 1999 constitution) and remained common practice. However, the legal basis was no longer the same: concordats no longer complemented the Pact as an element of federal law, but proceeded from unified cantonal law, which takes precedence over cantonal law but is subject to federal norms.

The definition established by the Diet in 1836 (adherence of a majority of 12 cantons) lost its meaning and the concept itself expanded. The revisions of the 1848 Constitution did not affect concordats in force, provided they complied with the new federal law. During the 1860s, the democratic movement, with cantonal orientation, also demanded direct political participation of the people for concordats. However, unlike the legislative referendum, the concordat referendum was not or was only partially introduced in many cantons.

== Subject matters ==
During the second half of the 19th and early 20th centuries, concordats regulated various subjects, including:

- the form of certificates of origin (1854)
- reciprocal communication of civil status acts (1855–1875)
- protection of intellectual property in literature and art (1856–1883)
- free establishment of pastors in evangelical cantons (1862)
- assistance and burial costs for the poor who had resided in a canton other than their canton of origin (1865–1875)
- freedom of establishment for the medical profession (1867–1877)
- warranty for defects in livestock sales (1852)
- circulation of bicycles and automobiles (1904 and 1914)
- judicial assistance for collecting public law claims (1911)

At the beginning of the 21st century, concordats address the free establishment of pastors, lotteries, livestock trade, cableways without federal concession, tax law, the health sector, public procurement, public education and universities, penal execution, and arms trade. The regulation of the last two areas revealed the limits of the system, leading to federal legislative efforts. While attempts to adopt a framework law for penal execution were unsuccessful, those relating to the codification of arms trade resulted in federal law. This evolution illustrates the loss of importance of concordats, linked to the centralizing tendencies of the federal state.
