= List of alluvial sites in Switzerland =

This list of alluvial sites in Switzerland is based on the Federal Inventory of Alluvial sites of National Importance, part of a 1992 Ordinance of the Swiss Federal Council implementing the Federal Law on the Protection of Nature and Cultural Heritage. It lists heritage floodplains of Switzerland.

== Inventory of Alluvial sites of National Importance ==
Nb	Site	Municipalities	Canton(s)
2	Haumättli	Möhlin	AG
3	Koblenzer Rhein und Laufen	Koblenz, Rietheim	AG
4	Seldenhalde	Schleitheim	SH
5	Eggrank-Thurspitz	Andelfingen, Flaach, Kleinandelfingen, Marthalen, Buchberg, Rüdlingen	SH, ZH
6	Schäffäuli	Neunforn	TG
7	Wuer	Frauenfeld, Uesslingen-Buch, Warth-Weiningen	TG
8	Hau-Äuli	Frauenfeld, Warth-Weiningen	TG
9	Wyden bei Pfyn	Felben-Wellhausen, Hüttlingen, Pfyn	TG
11	Unteres Ghögg	Bischofszell	TG
12	Ghöggerhütte	Bischofszell, Niederbüren	SG, TG
14	Glatt nordwestlich Flawil	Flawil, Oberbüren, Oberuzwil	SG
16	Gillhof-Glattburg	Niederhelfenschwil, Oberbüren, Uzwil, Zuzwil	SG
18	Thurauen Wil-Weieren	Uzwil, Wil, Zuzwil	SG
19	Thur und Necker bei Lütisburg	Bütschwil, Ganterschwil, Lütisburg, Mogelsberg	SG
27	Rhäzünser Rheinauen	Bonaduz, Domat/Ems, Rhäzüns, Rothenbrunnen	GR
28	Cumparduns	Fürstenau, Scharans, Sils im Domleschg, Thusis	GR
29	Cauma	Castrisch, Sagogn, Schluein	GR
30	Plaun da Foppas	Ilanz, Rueun, Schnaus	GR
31	Cahuons	Sumvitg, Trun	GR
32	Disla-Pardomat	Disentis/Mustér, Sumvitg	GR
33	Fontanivas-Sonduritg	Disentis/Mustér	GR
34	Gravas	Tujetsch	GR
35	Ogna da Pardiala	Breil/Brigels, Rueun, Waltensburg/Vuorz	GR
36	Auenreste Klingnauer Stausee	Böttstein, Klingnau, Koblenz, Leuggern	AG
37	Wasserschloss Brugg-Stilli	Brugg, Gebenstorf, Stilli, Untersiggenthal, Windisch	AG
40	Umiker Schachen-Stierenhölzli	Brugg, Schinznach-Bad, Schinznach-Dorf, Umiken, Villnachern	AG
44	Oberburger Schachen	Burgdorf, Hasle bei Burgdorf, Heimiswil, Rüegsau	BE
45	Emmenschachen	Luterbach, Zuchwil	SO
46	Utzenstorfer Schachen	Utzenstorf	BE
47	Altwässer der Aare und der Zihl	Büren an der Aare, Dotzigen, Meienried, Meinisberg, Safnern, Scheuren, Schwadernau	BE
48	Alte Aare: Lyss-Dotzigen	Büetigen, Busswil bei Büren, Dotzigen, Kappelen, Lyss, Schwadernau, Studen, Worben	BE
49	Alte Aare: Aarberg-Lyss	Aarberg, Kappelen, Lyss	BE
50	Sagnes de la Burtignière	Le Chenit	VD
51	Reussinsel Risi	Mellingen, Stetten, Tägerig	AG
52	Les Iles de Villeneuve	Granges-près-Marnand, Villeneuve	FR, VD
53	Niederried-Oltigenmatt	Golaten, Mühleberg, Niederried bei Kallnach, Radelfingen, Wileroltigen	BE
55	Senseauen	Albligen, Guggisberg, Köniz, Neuenegg, Wahlern, Alterswil, Heitenried, Plaffeien, St. Antoni, Ueberstorf, Zumholz	BE, FR
58	Teuffengraben-Sackau	Rüeggisberg, Rüschegg, Wahlern	BE
59	Laupenau	Ferenbalm, Laupen, Mühleberg	BE
60	Bois du Dévin	Hauterive, Marly	FR
61	Ärgera: Plasselb-Marly	Giffers, Marly, Pierrafortscha, Plasselb, St. Silvester, Tentlingen, Villarsel-sur-Marly	FR
62	La Sarine: Rossens-Fribourg	Arconciel, Corpataux-Magnedens, Fribourg, Hauterive, Marly, Pierrafortscha, Pont-la-Ville, Rossens, Treyvaux, Villars-sur-Glâne	FR
64	Broc	Botterens, Broc, Bulle, Morlon	FR
65	Les Auges d'Estavannens	Enney, Estavannens, Grandvillard, Gruyères	FR
66	Les Auges de Neirivue	Grandvillard, Haut-Intyamon, Villars-sous-Mont	FR
68	La Sarine près Château-d'Oex	Château-d'Oex	VD
69	Belper Giessen	Allmendingen, Belp, Bern, Kehrsatz, Köniz, Münsingen, Muri bei Bern, Rubigen	BE
70	Chandergrien	Spiez	BE
71	Augand	Reutigen, Spiez, Wimmis	BE
72	Heustrich	Aeschi bei Spiez, Reichenbach im Kandertal, Wimmis	BE
74	Gastereholz	Kandersteg	BE
75	Brünnlisau	Diemtigen, Erlenbach im Simmental, Wimmis	BE
76	Wilerau	Diemtigen, Erlenbach im Simmental	BE
77	Niedermettlisau	Därstetten, Erlenbach im Simmental	BE
78	Engstlige: Bim Stei-Oybedly	Frutigen	BE
79	Weissenau Castle	Unterseen	BE
80	Chappelistutz	Gsteigwiler, Wilderswil	BE
81	In Erlen	Grindelwald	BE
83	Jägglisglunte	Brienz	BE
84	Sytenwald	Meiringen	BE
86	Sandey	Innertkirchen	BE
87	Rüsshalden	Mellingen, Wohlenschwil	AG
88	Tote Reuss-Alte Reuss	Bremgarten, Eggenwil, Fischbach-Göslikon, Künten	AG
91	Rottenschwiler Moos	Hermetschwil-Staffeln, Rottenschwil, Unterlunkhofen	AG
92	Still Rüss-Rickenbach	Aristau, Jonen, Merenschwand, Oberlunkhofen, Rottenschwil, Unterlunkhofen, Obfelden, Ottenbach	AG, ZH
95	Ober Schachen-Rüssspitz	Hünenberg, Merenschwand, Mühlau, Obfelden	AG, ZG, ZH
97	Frauental	Cham	ZG
98	Ämmenmatt	Doppleschwand, Entlebuch, Wolhusen	LU
99	Schlierenrüti	Alpnach	OW
100	Städerried	Alpnach	OW
101	Laui	Giswil	OW
102	Steinibach	Giswil, Sarnen	OW
104	Tristel	Muotathal	SZ
105	Reussdelta	Flüelen, Seedorf	UR
107	Stössi	Silenen	UR
108	Widen bei Realp	Hospental, Realp	UR
109	Hinter Klöntal	Glarus	GL
110	Biber im Ägeriried	Einsiedeln, Rothenthurm, Oberägeri	SZ, ZG
112	Vallon de la Laire	Avusy, Chancy	GE
113	Vallon de l'Allondon	Dardagny, Russin, Satigny	GE
114	Moulin de Vert	Cartigny	GE
115	Les Gravines	Collex-Bossy, Versoix	GE
118	Grand Bataillard	Chavannes-de-Bogis, Chavannes-des-Bois, Commugny	VD
119	Embouchure de l'Aubonne	Allaman, Buchillon	VD
120	Les Iles de Bussigny	Aclens, Bremblens, Bussigny-près-Lausanne, Echandens	VD
121	La Roujarde	Gollion, Penthaz, Vufflens-la-Ville	VD
122	Bois de Vaux	Lussery-Villars, Penthalaz	VD
123	Les Grangettes	Noville	VD
124	Iles des Clous	Yvorne	VD
125	Source du Trient	Trient	VS
127	Lotrey	Evolène	VS
128	Pramousse-Satarma	Evolène	VS
129	La Borgne en amont d'Arolla	Evolène	VS
130	Salay (Switzerland)	Evolène	VS
131	Ferpècle	Evolène	VS
132	Derborence	Conthey	VS
133	Pfynwald	Leuk, Salgesch, Sierre, Varen	VS
134	Tännmattu	Blatten, Wiler (Lötschen)	VS
135	Chiemadmatte	Blatten	VS
138	Grund	Brig-Glis, Ried-Brig	VS
139	Bilderne	Filet, Mörel	VS
140	Zeiterbode	Grafschaft	VS
141	Matte	Reckingen-Gluringen	VS
142	Sand	Oberwald	VS
144	La Réchesse	Epiquerez	JU
145	La Lomenne	Montmelon, Saint-Ursanne	JU
146	Bosco dei Valloni	Bedretto	TI
147	Soria	Bedretto	TI
148	Geròra	Airolo	TI
149	Albinasca	Airolo	TI
150	Bolla di Loderio	Biasca, Malvaglia, Semione	TI
151	Brenno di Blenio	Aquila, Castro, Corzoneso, Dongio, Largario, Leontica, Lottigna, Ludiano, Olivone, Ponto Valentino, Prugiasco, Torre	TI
155	Campall	Olivone	TI
156	Bassa	Lumino	TI
157	Isola	Lumino, San Vittore	GR, TI
158	Ai Fornas	Roveredo, San Vittore	GR
160	Pascoletto	Grono, Leggia	GR
161	Rosera	Lostallo	GR
162	Pomareda	Lostallo, Soazza	GR
164	Canton	Mesocco, Soazza	GR
166	Pian di Alne	Cauco, Rossa	GR
167	Boschetti	Gudo, Sementina	TI
168	Ciossa Antognini	Cadenazzo, Cugnasco, Gudo, Locarno	TI
169	Bolle di Magadino	Gordola, Locarno, Magadino	TI
170	Saleggio	Aurigeno, Gordevio, Maggia, Moghegno	TI
171	Maggia	Bignasco, Cevio, Coglio, Giumaglio, Lodano, Maggia, Moghegno, Someo	TI
172	Somprei-Lovalt	Broglio, Peccia, Prato-Sornico	TI
174	Strada	Tschlin	GR
176	Plan-Sot	Ramosch	GR
177	Panas-ch-Resgia	Ramosch, Sent	GR
181	Lischana-Suronnas	Scuol	GR
185	Sotruinas	Susch	GR
187	Blaisch dal Piz dal Ras	Susch	GR
188	San Batrumieu	Madulain, Zuoz	GR
190	Isla Glischa-Arvins-Seglias	Bever, La Punt Chamues-ch, Samedan	GR
194	Flaz	Celerina/Schlarigna, Samedan	GR
195	II Rom Valchava-Graveras (Müstair)	Müstair, Santa Maria Val Müstair, Valchava	GR
198	Les Grèves de Concise	Concise	VD
200	Les Grèves de Grandson-Bonvillars-Onnens	Bonvillars, Grandson, Onnens	VD
201	Les Grèves d'Yverdon-Les Tuileries	Grandson, Montagny-près-Yverdon, Yverdon-les-Bains	VD
202	Les Grèves d'Yverdon-Yvonand	Cheseaux-Noréaz, Yverdon-les-Bains, Yvonand	VD
203	Les Grèves d'Yvonand-Cheyres	Cheyres, Yvonand	FR, VD
204	Les Grèves de Cheyres-Font	Châbles, Cheyres, Font	FR
205	Les Grèves d'Estavayer-le-Lac-Chevroux	Autavaux, Estavayer-le-Lac, Forel, Chevroux	FR, VD
206	Les Grèves de Chevroux-Portalban	Chevroux, Gletterens, Portalban	FR, VD
207	Les Grèves de Portalban-Cudrefin	Chabrey, Cudrefin, Delley	FR, VD
208	Les Grèves du Chablais de Cudrefin	Cudrefin	VD
209	Seewald-Fanel	Gampelen, Ins, Marin-Epagnier	BE, NE
211	Les Monod	Apples, Ballens, Mollens, Montricher, Pampigny	VD
216	Chrauchbach: Haris	Matt	GL
217	La Neirigue et la Glâne	Autigny, Le Glèbe, Massonnens, Villaz-Saint-Pierre, Villorsonnens	FR
218	Vers Vaux	Chancy	GE
219	Altenrhein	Thal	SG
220	Rossgarten	Leibstadt, Schwaderloch	AG
221	Aare bei Altreu	Arch, Leuzigen, Bettlach, Selzach	BE, SO
222	Heidenweg/St. Petersinsel	Erlach, Twann	BE
223	Hagneckdelta	Hagneck, Lüscherz, Täuffelen	BE
224	Rohr-Oey	Lauenen	BE
225	Aahorn	Lachen	SZ
226	La Torneresse à l'Etivaz	Château-d'Oex	VD
227	Sonlèrt-Sabbione	Bignasco, Cavergno	TI
228	Foce della Maggia	Ascona, Locarno	TI
229	Madonna del Piano	Croglio, Monteggio	TI
301	Les Iles de Bogis	Bogis-Bossey, Chavannes-de-Bogis	VD
303	Solalex	Bex	VD
304	Embouchure de la Broye	Bellerive	VD
305	Embouchure du Chandon	Avenches, Faoug	VD
307	Le Chablais	Bas-Vully, Galmiz, Muntelier	FR
310	Lac de Montsalvens	Charmey	FR
313	Muscherensense	Plaffeien	FR
314	Kalte Sense	Guggisberg, Plaffeien	BE, FR
315	Rotenbach	Guggisberg, Rüschegg	BE
319	Emmeschlucht	Eggiwil, Schangnau	BE
321	Harzisboden	Habkern, Oberried am Brienzersee	BE
322	Rezliberg	Lenk	BE
323	Hornbrügg	Adelboden	BE
324	Lochweid	Adelboden	BE
325	Gastere bei Selden	Kandersteg	BE
326	Tschingelsee	Reichenbach im Kandertal	BE
327	Ganzenlouwina	Grindelwald	BE
337	Möriken-Wildegg	Möriken-Wildegg, Othmarsingen	AG
338	Unterer Schiltwald	Buchrain, Emmen, Eschenbach	LU
339	Badhus-Graben	Doppleschwand, Romoos	LU
340	Entlental	Entlebuch, Hasle	LU
341	Flühli	Flühli	LU
342	Bibermüli	Hemishofen, Ramsen	SH
343	Freienstein-Tössegg	Eglisau, Freienstein-Teufen, Rorbas	ZH
344	Dättlikon-Freienstein	Dättlikon, Embrach, Freienstein-Teufen, Rorbas	ZH
345	Oberglatt	Oberglatt, Rümlang	ZH
349	Grosstal	Isenthal	UR
351	Unterschächen-Spiringen	Spiringen, Unterschächen	UR
352	Alpenrösli-Herrenrüti	Attinghausen, Engelberg	OW, UR
353	Altboden	Wassen	UR
354	Gorneren	Gurtnellen	UR
355	Stäuberboden	Silenen	UR
356	Unteralp	Andermatt	UR
357	Ghirone	Ghirone	TI
358	Chiggiogna-Lavorgo	Chiggiogna, Chironico	TI
359	Biaschina-Giornico	Giornico	TI
360	Fontane	Malvaglia	TI
361	Madra	Malvaglia	TI
362	Calnegia	Bignasco, Cavergno	TI
363	Mött di Tirman	Campo (Vallemaggia)	TI
364	Sonogno-Brione	Brione (Verzasca), Frasco, Gerra (Verzasca), Sonogno	TI
365	Ruscada	Cresciano	TI
366	Vezio-Aranno	Aranno, Breno, Fescoggia, Miglieglia	TI
367	Caslano	Caslano, Magliaso	TI
369	Goldachtobel	Goldach, Mörschwil, St. Gallen, Untereggen	SG
371	Ampferenboden	Krummenau, Urnäsch	AR, SG
373	Schilstal/Sand	Flums	SG
374	Rheinau/Cholau	Sevelen, Wartau	SG
376	Sarelli-Rosenbergli	Bad Ragaz	SG
380	Alp Val Tenigia	Sumvitg	GR
393	Isola/Plan Grand	Sils im Engadin/Segl, Stampa	GR
394	Ova da Roseg	Pontresina	GR
396	Ova dal Fuorn	Zernez	GR
399	Clairbief	Les Pommerats, Soubey	JU
1006	Glatscher da Gavirolas	Andiast, Waltensburg/Vuorz	GR
1008	Hüfifirn	Silenen	UR
1010	Brunnifirn	Silenen	UR
1013	Vadret Vallorgia	S-chanf	GR
1017	Vadret da Grialetsch	Susch	GR
1020	Silvrettagletscher	Klosters-Serneus	GR
1038	Glacier de Zinal	Ayer	VS
1044	Vadrec da la Bondasca	Bondo	GR
1046	Vadrec del Forno	Stampa	GR
1057	Tambogletscher	Medels im Rheinwald, Splügen	GR
1061	Paradiesgletscher	Hinterrhein	GR
1063	Canal Gletscher	Vals	GR
1066	Fanellgletscher	Vals	GR
1079	Ghiacciaio del Basòdino	Bignasco	TI
1085	Ofental Gletscher	Saas Almagell	VS
1115	Langgletscher/Jegigletscher	Blatten	VS
1118	Üssre Baltschiedergletscher	Baltschieder	VS
1121	Kanderfirn	Kandersteg	BE
1129	Wildstrubelgletscher	Leukerbad	VS
1132	Rezligletscher	Lenk	BE
1139	Geltengletscher	Lauenen	BE
1147	Triftgletscher	Zermatt	VS
1148	Hohlichtgletscher	Randa, Täsch	VS
1154	Feegletscher	Saas Fee	VS
1160	Abberggletscher	St. Niklaus	VS
1161	Glacier de Valsorey	Bourg-Saint-Pierre	VS
1163	Glacier d'Otemma	Bagnes	VS
1165	Glacier du Brenay	Bagnes	VS
1167	Glacier du Petit Combin	Bagnes	VS
1168	Glacier de Corbassière	Bagnes	VS
1170	Glacier de Cheilon	Hérémence	VS
1175	Grand Désert	Nendaz	VS
1206	Gauligletscher	Innertkirchen	BE
1214	Diechtergletscher	Guttannen	BE
1215	Rhonegletscher	Oberwald	VS
1216	Rosenlauigletscher	Schattenhalb	BE
1218	Tiefengletscher	Realp	UR
1219	Dammagletscher	Göschenen	UR
1221	Chelengletscher	Göschenen	UR
1228	Kartigelfirn	Wassen	UR
1229	Wallenburfirn	Göschenen	UR
1231	Vadrec da Fedoz	Stampa	GR
1235	Vadret da Roseg	Samedan	GR
1238	Vadret da Morteratsch	Pontresina	GR
1246	Glatscher da Plattas	Medel (Lucmagn)	GR
1247	Glatscher da Lavaz	Medel (Lucmagn)	GR
1252	Vadret da Porchabella	Bergün/Bravuogn, S-chanf	GR
1254	Vadret da Palü	Poschiavo	GR
1258	Vadret da Fenga "Süd"	Ramosch, Sent	GR
1262	Glatschiu dil Segnas	Flims	GR
1301	Val Frisal	Breil/Brigels	GR
1302	Oberstafelbach	Linthal	GL
1310	Rabiusa Engi	Safien	GR
1315	Pradatsch, Val Plavna	Tarasp	GR
1316	Plaun Segnas Sut	Flims	GR
1320	Plaun la Greina	Vrin	GR
1323	Lampertschalp	Vals	GR
1327	Bächlisboden	Guttannen	BE
1342	Bergalga	Avers	GR
1347	Ragn d'Err	Tinizong-Rona	GR
1348	Plaun Vadret, Val Fex	Sils im Engadin/Segl	GR
1352	Engstligenalp	Adelboden	BE
1354	Spittelmatte	Kandersteg, Leukerbad	BE, VS
1401	Gamchigletscher	Reichenbach im Kandertal	BE
1404	Aua da Fedoz	Stampa	GR
1405	Glatscher Davos la Buora	Medel (Lucmagn)	GR

== See also ==
- Nature parks in Switzerland
- Trift Glacier Foreland which is not recorded in the Federal Inventory (cf. list above)
