= Steinibach =

Steinibach may refer to several places in Switzerland:

- Steinibach, Glarus, a hamlet of Elm
- Steinibach, Obwalden, an alluvial site in Switzerland
