= Alluvial plain =

Region on which rivers have deposited sediment

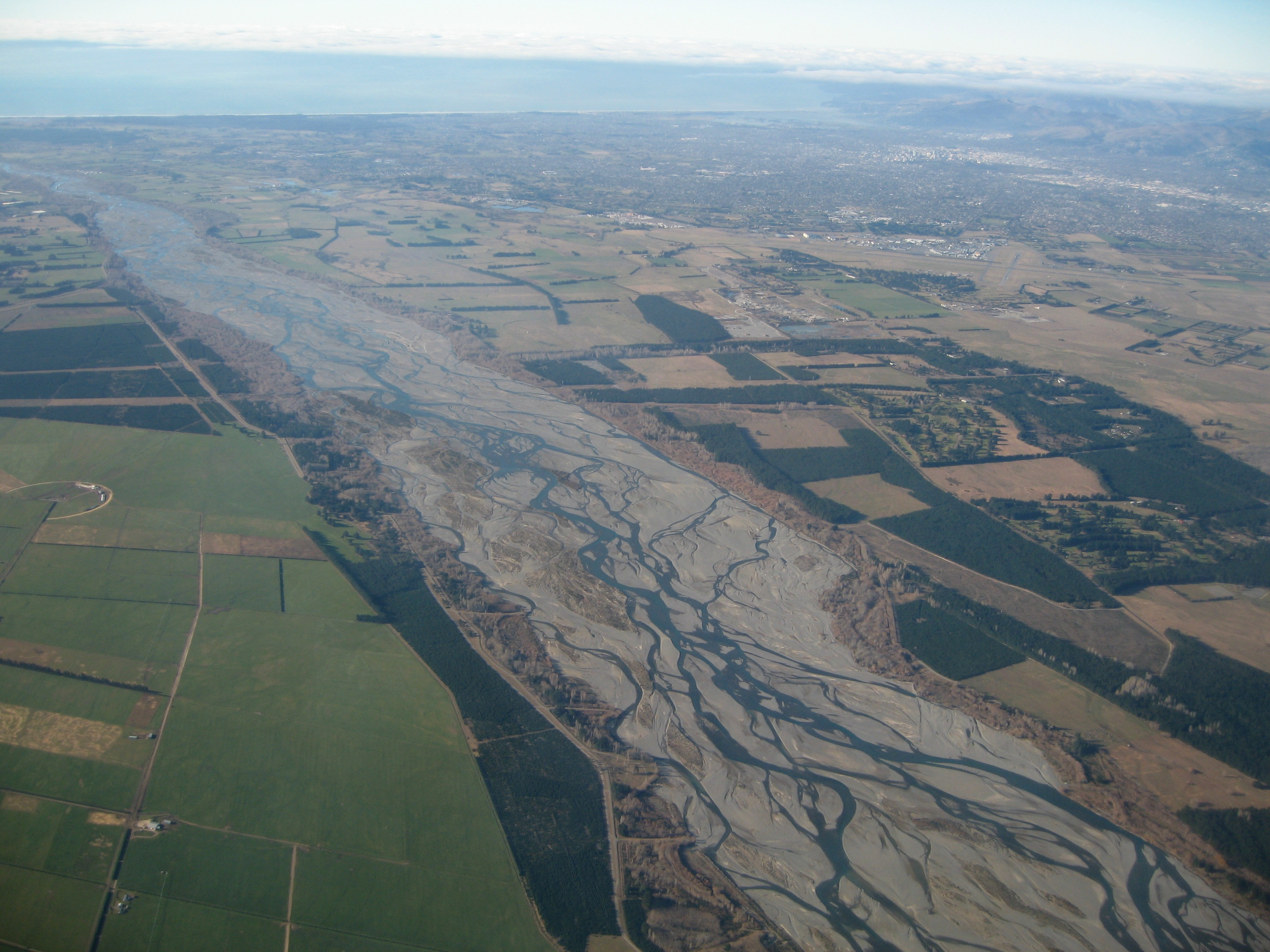
Floodplain (centre) within the alluvial plain of the Waimakariri River, New Zealand (part of the Canterbury Plains).

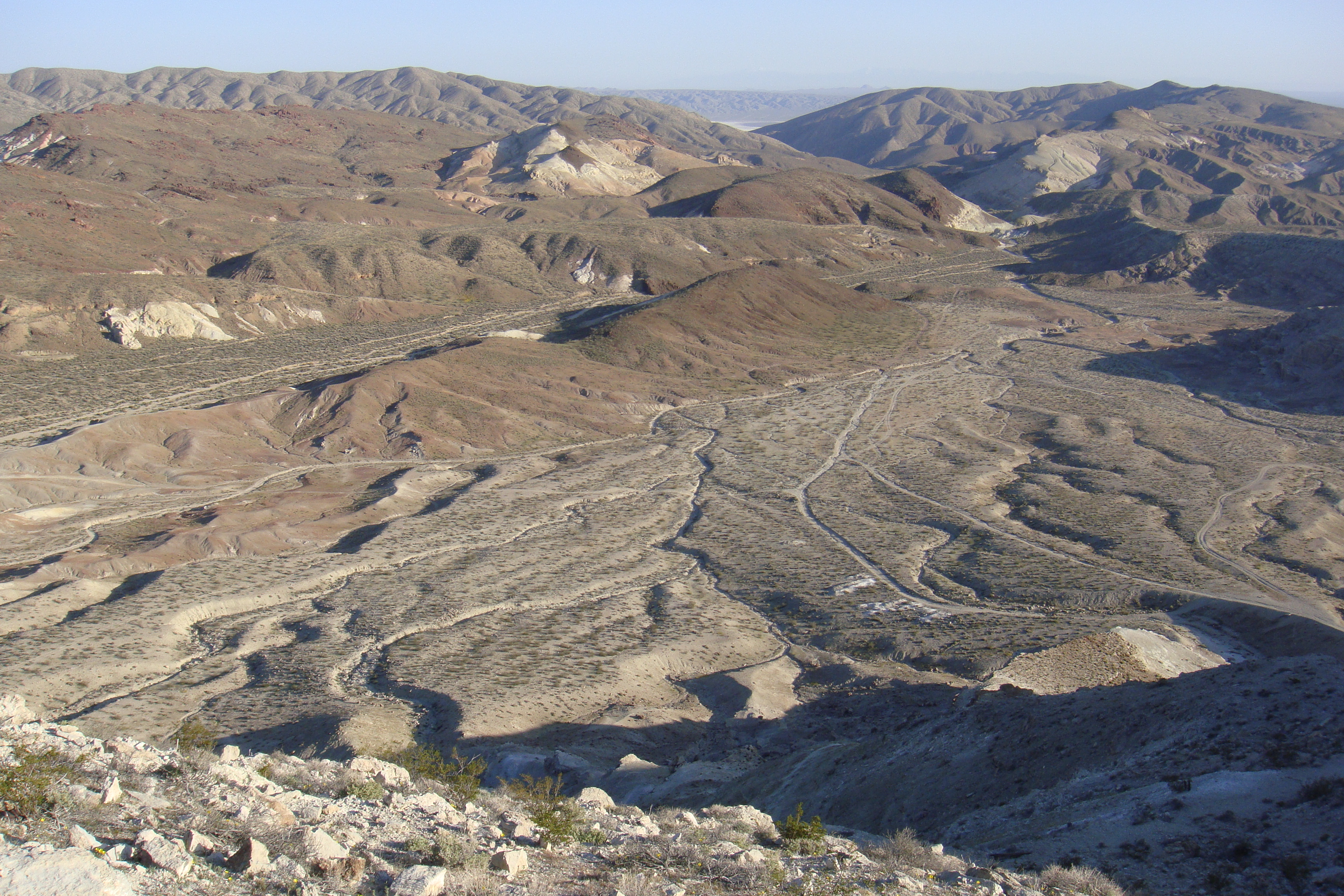
A small, incised alluvial plain from Red Rock Canyon State Park (California).

An alluvial plain is a plain (an essentially flat landform) created by the deposition of sediment over a long period by one or more rivers coming from highland regions, from which alluvial soil forms. A floodplain is part of the process, being the smaller area over which the rivers flood at a particular time. In contrast, the alluvial plain is the larger area representing the region over which the floodplains have shifted over geological time.

As the highlands erode due to weathering and water flow, the sediment from the hills is transported to the lower plain. Various creeks will carry the water further to a river, lake, bay, or ocean. As the sediments are deposited during flood conditions in the floodplain of a creek, the elevation of the floodplain will be raised. As this reduces the channel floodwater capacity, the creek will, over time, seek new, lower paths, forming a meander (a curved path). The leftover higher locations, typically natural levees at the margins of the flood channel, will be eroded by lateral stream erosion, local rainfall, and possibly wind transport if the climate is arid and does not support soil-holding grasses. These processes, over geologic time, will form the plain, a region with little relief (local changes in elevation) yet with a constant but slight slope.

The Glossary of Landform and Geologic Terms, maintained by the United States National Cooperative Soil Survey (NCSS), defines an "alluvial plain" as "a large assemblage of fluvial landforms (braided streams, terraces, etc.) that form a low gradient, regional ramps along the flanks of mountains and extend great distances from their sources (e.g., High Plains of North America)". Use of "alluvial plain" as a general, informal term for a broad flood plain or a low-gradient delta is explicitly discouraged. The NCSS glossary instead suggests "flood plain".

Alluvial plains have similar traits to a river delta; however, the river delta will flow into a larger body of water. Alluvial plains generally don't have this.

Commonly, alluvial plains are fertile as they are continually replenished by new deposits.

== Alluvial plains by continent ==
=== Africa ===
- Barotse Floodplain in Angola and Zambia
- Kafue Flats in Zambia
- Okavango Delta in Botswana

=== Asia ===
- Chianan Plain in Taiwan
- Indo-Gangetic Plain in Bangladesh, India, and Pakistan
- Mekong Delta in Vietnam
- Mesopotamia in Iraq
- North China Plain in China
- Northeast China Plain in China
- Punjab Plain in India and Pakistan
- Yangtze Plain in China

=== Europe ===
- Baetic Depression in Andalusia, Spain
- Haute vallée de la Sarthe in France
- Iskar Valleys in Bulgaria
- Lower Danubian Plain, Bulgaria and Romania
- Mesaoria in Cyprus
- Multiple alluvial sites in Switzerland
- Palakaria Valley in Bulgaria
- Po Valley in Italy
- Rhine–Meuse–Scheldt Delta in the Netherlands
- Struma Valley in Bulgaria
- Tundzha Valleys in Bulgaria
- Upper Thracian Plain in Bulgaria

=== North America ===
- Laguna de Santa Rosa in the United States
- Mississippi Alluvial Plain in the United States
- Oxnard Plain in the United States
- Santa Clara Valley in San Jose, California, United States
- Tempisque River Plain in Costa Rica

=== Oceania ===
- Canterbury Plains in Canterbury, New Zealand
- Cumberland Plain in Greater Western Sydney, New South Wales, Australia
- Darling Riverine Plains in South-eastern Australia
- Lockyer Valley in South-eastern Queensland, Australia
- Southland Plains in Southland, New Zealand
- Waikato Plains in Waikato, New Zealand

=== South America ===
- Gran Chaco in Argentina, Bolivia, and Paraguay
- Llanos in Colombia and Venezuela
- Llanos de Moxos in Bolivia
- Middle Amazon in Brazil

== See also ==
- Alluvial fan
- Alluvium
- Coastal plain
- Desert pavement
- Floodplain
- River delta
