= Grand Desert =

Grand Desert may refer to the following places:

- Grand Desert, Nova Scotia, Canada
- Grand Désert in Switzerland
