= Bas-Intyamon =

- Municipality
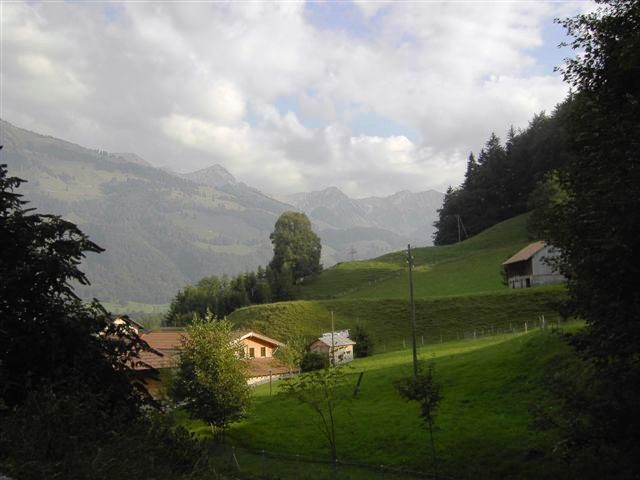
- Landscape at Bas-Intyamon

- Flag Coat of arms
- Location of Bas-Intyamon
- Location within Switzerland Location within Canton of Fribourg
- Coordinates: 46°34′N 7°5′E
- Country: Switzerland
- Canton: Fribourg
- District: Gruyère

Government
  - Mayor: Syndic; Claudio Derada

Area
  - Total: 33.27 km^{2} (12.85 sq mi)
- Elevation: 720 m (2,360 ft)

Population (December 2020)
  - Total: 1,555
  - Density: 46.74/km^{2} (121.1/sq mi)
- Time zone: UTC+01:00 (CET)
  - Summer (DST): UTC+02:00 (CEST)
- Postal code: 1665-1667
- SFOS number: 2162
- ISO 3166 code: CH-FR
- Surrounded by: Grandvillard, Gruyères, Haut-Intyamon, Val-de-Charmey
- Website: www.bas-intyamon.ch

Bas-Intyamon (Arpitan: Bâs-Enque-amont) is a municipality in the district of Gruyère in the canton of Fribourg in Switzerland. The villages of Enney, Estavannens and Villars-sous-Mont formed it.

== Geography ==
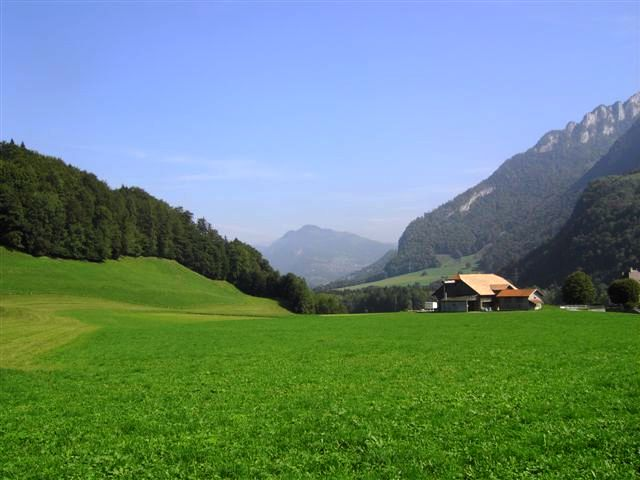
Landscape in Bas-Intyamon

Aerial view of Villars-sous-Mont (1964)

Bas-Intyamon has an area, as of 2009, of 33.3 square kilometers (12.9 mi^{2}). Of this area, 16.22 km^{2} (6.26 mi^{2}) or 48.7% is used for agricultural purposes, while 13.25 km^{2} (5.12 mi^{2}) or 39.8% is forested. Of the rest of the land, 0.92 km^{2} (0.36 mi^{2}) or 2.8% is settled (buildings or roads), 0.19 km^{2} (0.073 mi^{2}) or 0.6% is either rivers or lakes and 2.69 km^{2} (1.04 mi^{2}) or 8.1% is unproductive land.

Of the built up area, housing and buildings made up 1.2% and transportation infrastructure made up 1.1%. Out of the forested land, 34.6% of the total land area is heavily forested and 3.6% is covered with orchards or small clusters of trees. Of the agricultural land, 0.5% is used for growing crops and 10.3% is pastures and 37.9% is used for alpine pastures. All the water in the municipality is flowing water. Of the unproductive areas, 4.7% is unproductive vegetation and 3.4% is too rocky for vegetation.

== Demographics ==
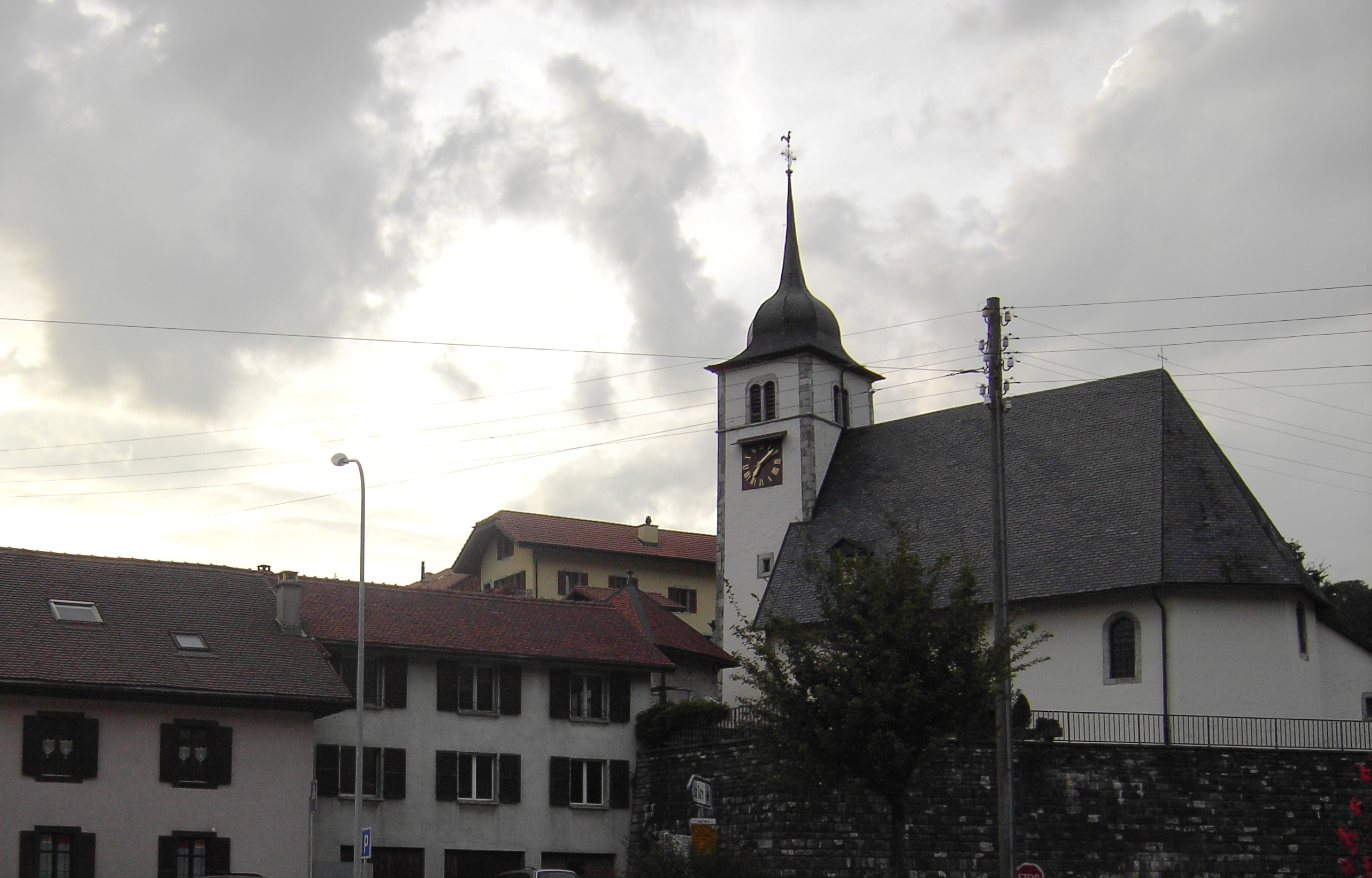
Enney village and church

Bas-Intyamon has a population (as of December 2020) of 1,555. As of 2008, 11.9% of the population are resident foreign nationals. Over the last 10 years (2000–2010) the population has changed at a rate of 17%. Migration accounted for 18.2%, while births and deaths accounted for 2.4%.

Most of the population (as of 2000) speaks French (95.3%) as their first language, German is the second most common (2.1%) and Albanian is the third (1.5%).

As of 2008, the population was 48.6% male and 51.4% female. The population was made up of 463 Swiss men (42.2% of the population) and 70 (6.4%) non-Swiss men. There were 503 Swiss women (45.9%) and 60 (5.5%) non-Swiss women.

As of 2000, children and teenagers (0–19 years old) make up 23.6% of the population, while adults (20–64 years old) make up 60.6% and seniors (over 64 years old) make up 15.9%.

As of 2009, the construction rate of new housing units was 6.5 new units per 1000 residents. The vacancy rate for the municipality, in 2010, was 2.2%.

== Sights ==
The entire villages of Estavannens and Villars-sous-Mont are designated as part of the Inventory of Swiss Heritage Sites.

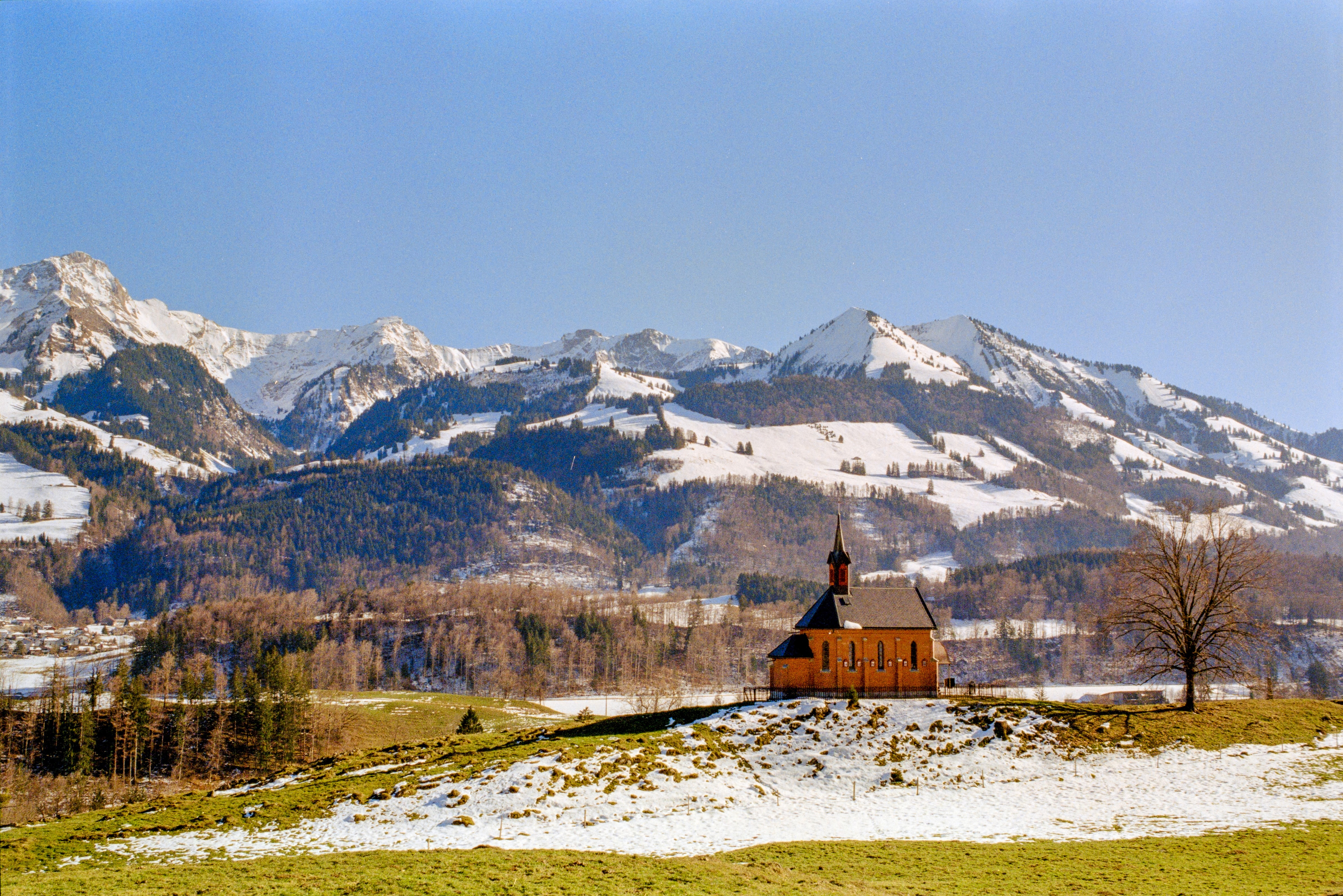
Chapel in Villars-sous-Mont

== Politics ==
In the 2011 federal election the most popular party was the SP which received 30.7% of the vote. The next three most popular parties were the CVP (23.6%), the SVP (21.9%) and the FDP (11.1%).

The SPS improved their position in Bas-Intyamon rising to first, from second in 2007 (with 22.4%) The CVP moved from first in 2007 (with 39.0%) to second in 2011, the SVP retained about the same popularity (18.2% in 2007) and the FDP retained about the same popularity (9.3% in 2007). A total of 375 votes were cast in this election, of which 8 or 2.1% were invalid.

== Economy ==
As of 2010, Bas-Intyamon had an unemployment rate of 2.9%. As of 2008, there were 45 people employed in the primary economic sector and about 17 businesses involved in this sector. 58 people were employed in the secondary sector and there were 5 businesses in this sector. 142 people were employed in the tertiary sector, with 24 businesses in this sector. There were residents of the municipality who were employed in some capacity.

In 2008 the total number of full-time equivalent jobs was 197. The number of jobs in the primary sector was 36, of which 33 were in agriculture and 3 were in forestry or lumber production. The number of jobs in the secondary sector was 53 of which 41 or (77.4%) were in manufacturing, 11 or (20.8%) were in mining and 1 was in construction. The number of jobs in the tertiary sector was 108. In the tertiary sector; 33 or 30.6% were in wholesale or retail sales or the repair of motor vehicles, 1 was in the movement and storage of goods, 9 or 8.3% were in a hotel or restaurant, 2 or 1.9% were in the information industry, 2 or 1.9% were the insurance or financial industry, 1 was a technical professional or scientist, 4 or 3.7% were in education and 48 or 44.4% were in health care.

Of the working population, 5.4% used public transportation to get to work, and 72.7% used a private car.

== Education ==
The Canton of Fribourg school system provides one year of non-obligatory Kindergarten, followed by six years of Primary school. This is followed by three years of obligatory lower Secondary school where the students are separated according to ability and aptitude. Following the lower Secondary students may attend a three or four year optional upper Secondary school. The upper Secondary school is divided into gymnasium (university preparatory) and vocational programs. After they finish the upper Secondary program, students may choose to attend a Tertiary school or continue their apprenticeship.

During the 2010-11 school year, there were a total of 76 students attending 4 classes in Bas-Intyamon. A total of 174 students from the municipality attended any school, either in the municipality or outside of it. There were no kindergarten classes in the municipality, but 14 students attended kindergarten in a neighboring municipality. The municipality had 4 primary classes and 76 students. During the same year, there were no lower secondary classes in the municipality, but 36 students attended lower secondary school in a neighboring municipality. There were no upper Secondary classes or vocational classes, but there were 8 upper Secondary students and 46 upper Secondary vocational students who attended classes in another municipality. The municipality had no non-university Tertiary classes, but there were 2 specialized Tertiary students who attended classes in another municipality.
