= Estavannens =

Former municipality, canton of Fribourg

- Former municipality
- Center of Estavannens-Dessus with the church

- Coat of arms
- Location of Estavannens
- Location within Switzerland Location within Canton of Fribourg
- Coordinates: 46.565°N 7.103°E
- Country: Switzerland
- Canton: Fribourg
- District: Gruyère
- Municipality: Bas-Intyamon

Population (2000)
  - Total: 280
- Time zone: UTC+01:00 (CET)
  - Summer (DST): UTC+02:00 (CEST)
- ISO 3166 code: CH-FR
- Website

Estavannens is a former municipality in the Gruyère district of the canton of Fribourg, Switzerland. In 2004 it merged with Enney and Villars-sous-Mont to form the municipality of Bas-Intyamon. It lies on the right bank of the Sarine and comprised Estavannens-Dessus and Estavannens-Dessous.

== History ==
Estavannens is first mentioned in 1231 as Extavanens. It was part of the county of Gruyère until 1555, then of the bailiwick (1555–1798) and later the district of the same name. In 1369 Rodolphe IV of Gruyère freed various families of Estavannens from mainmorte, in 1388 all the communities of the castellany, and in 1396 he granted new liberties to the inhabitants of Estavannens. When Fribourg became master of part of the county of Gruyère in 1555, some inhabitants of Estavannens revolted.

Estavannens at first belonged to the parish of Broc. It became a parish in 1578; until 1614 the parish also included Grandvillard. A chapel of Saint Mary Magdalene existed from the 14th century, and a new church was consecrated in 1635. The chapel of Le Dâ dates from 1846.

Straw plaiting was practiced in the 19th century. In 2000 more than half of the jobs in the municipality were in the primary sector (livestock farming and meadows). Since 1904 Estavannens has been served by Enney station on the Châtel-Saint-Denis–Montbovon line, and it is also connected to Bulle by bus. At the end of the 20th century it formed a primary school district with Grandvillard, Enney and Villars-sous-Mont. Since 1956 popular festivals of the poya (the ascent to the alpine pastures) have been held in Estavannens at irregular intervals.

Estavannens had 192 inhabitants in 1811, 246 in 1850, 208 in 1860, 258 in 1900, 342 in 1920, 313 in 1950, 258 in 1970 and 280 in 2000. In 2004 it merged with Enney and Villars-sous-Mont to form Bas-Intyamon.

== Bibliography ==
- Le vieux chalet, nos. 17–21, 1955–1956
- J. Pharisa, Estavannens 1989, manuscript, 1996
