= Lac du Grand Désert =

Lake in Switzerland

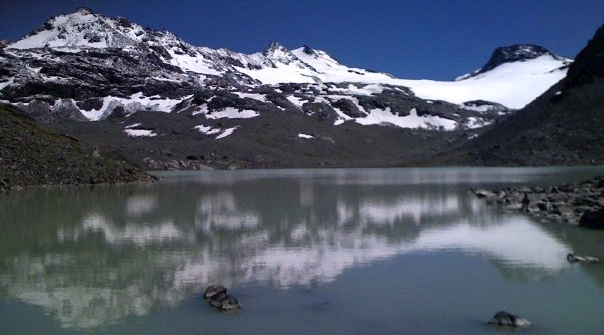

- Location within Canton of Valais Location within Switzerland Location within Alps
- Interactive map of Lac du Grand Désert
- Location: Nendaz, Valais
- Coordinates: 46°5′21″N 7°20′8″E
- Type: Glacial lake
- Basin countries: Switzerland
- Surface area: 5.7 ha (14 acres)
- Surface elevation: 2,642 m (8,668 ft)

Lac du Grand Désert is a lake in the canton of Valais, Switzerland. It is located at an elevation of 2642 m, fed by the Grand Désert Glacier.

== See also ==
- List of mountain lakes of Switzerland
