= Cugnasco-Gerra =

- Municipality
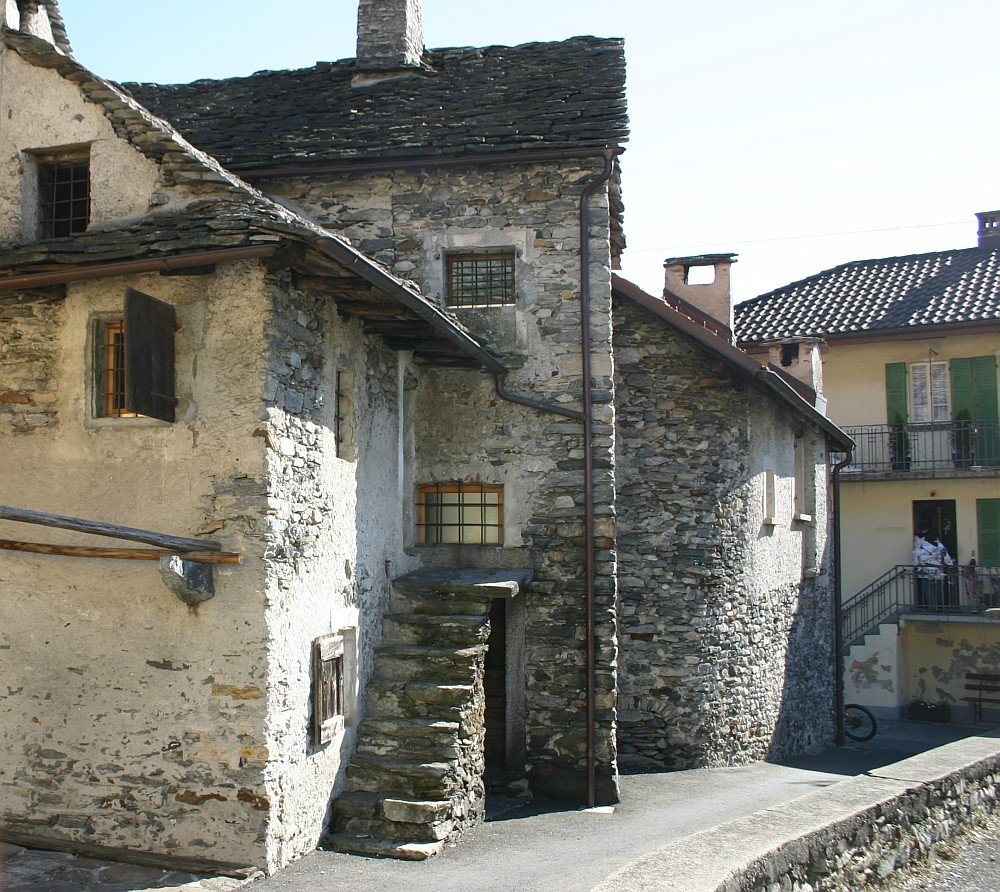
- Cugnasco

- Flag Coat of arms
- Location of Cugnasco-Gerra
- Location within Switzerland Location within Canton of Ticino
- Coordinates: 46°10′N 8°55′E
- Country: Switzerland
- Canton: Ticino
- District: Locarno

Government
  - Mayor: Sindaco

Area
  - Total: 35.72 km^{2} (13.79 sq mi)

Population (January 2009)
  - Total: 2,678
  - Density: 74.97/km^{2} (194.2/sq mi)
- Time zone: UTC+01:00 (CET)
  - Summer (DST): UTC+02:00 (CEST)
- Postal code: 6516
- SFOS number: 5138
- ISO 3166 code: CH-TI
- Localities: Cugnasco, Bosco, Boscioredo, Massarescio, Medoscio, Moncucco, Pianrestello, Sciarana, La Monda, Gerra Piano
- Surrounded by: Brione (Verzasca), Cadenazzo, Frasco, Gordola, Gudo, Lavertezzo, Locarno, Monte Carasso, Preonzo, Sementina, Sonogno, Vogorno
- Website: www.cugnasco-gerra.ch

Cugnasco-Gerra is a municipality in the canton of Ticino, Switzerland. It was formed on January 1, 2009, through the merger of Cugnasco and Gerra.

== Location ==
Aerial view from 600 m by Walter Mittelholzer (1919)

as of 2006, Cugnasco-Gerra has an area of 35.72 square kilometers (13.79 sq mi).

Cugnasco is on the outskirts of the Magadino valley. It includes the settlements of Boscioredo, Cugnasco, Bosco, Massarescio, Medoscio, Moncucco, Pianrestello and Sciarana.

Gerra consisted of Gerra Piano and Agarone, both exclaves in the Magadino Plain, and the main part of the municipality (Gerra Valle) in the Verzasca valley.

== History ==
Cugnasco is first mentioned in 1374 as Cunyascho. Gerra (Verzasca) is first mentioned in 1387 as Giera.

=== Cugnasco ===
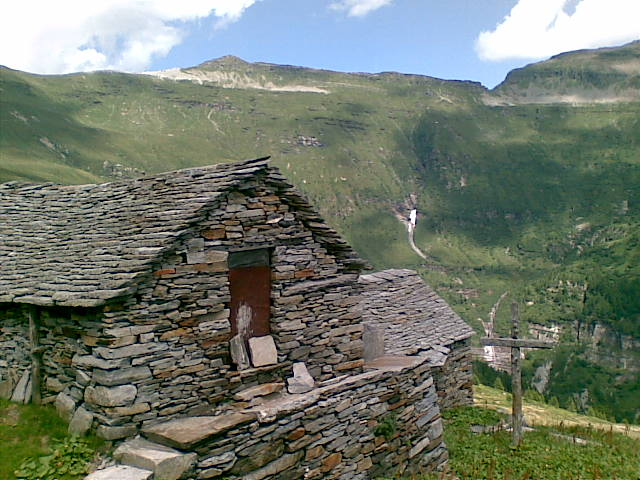
Alpine herder's hut at an elevation of 1,873 m (6,145 ft)

Today's mountain pastures of Ditto and Curogna are the oldest settlements of the municipality. The settlements in the marshy Ticino river floodplain, developed later. The present village developed mainly due to the herders who brought their cattle down into the Magadino valley for the winter. In the 13th and 14th Centuries there was a migration from Verzasca valley and about 150 inhabitants of Ditto and Curogna moved down into the valley. Cugnasco grew into a center of community life for the surrounding settlements.

As Cugnasco grew, a Servite monastery grew up as well. In 1653, the monastery was closed. However, the Chapel of the Beata Vergine delle Grazie continued to serve for the inhabitants of the plain. Before the chapel, they had to travel to Tenero for worship services. The small 15th Century church, now a heritage site of national significance containing valuable frescoes from the 16th and 17th Century, was the goal of many pilgrims from the region.

In 1635-56 the provost's St. Joseph Church was built. It later became a parish center, while Ditto and Curogna still had a Vicariate. Both the chapel of San Martino in Ditto and the SS Cristoforo e Anna in Curogna date from the 14th and 15th Century and contains frescoes from various periods.

Cugnasco was located at the crossroads of two important trade routes from Locarno to Bellinzona and from Cugnasco to Contone, which was near the so-called Porto sul Ticino, a river crossing. After the collapse of the bridge at Bellinzona in 1515, this second route became nearly the only way across the river. Historically, the economy of Cugnasco relied nearly exclusively on agriculture and pastoralism. However, by 2000 less than 15% of workers worked in agriculture and about three quarters were commuters.

=== Gerra ===
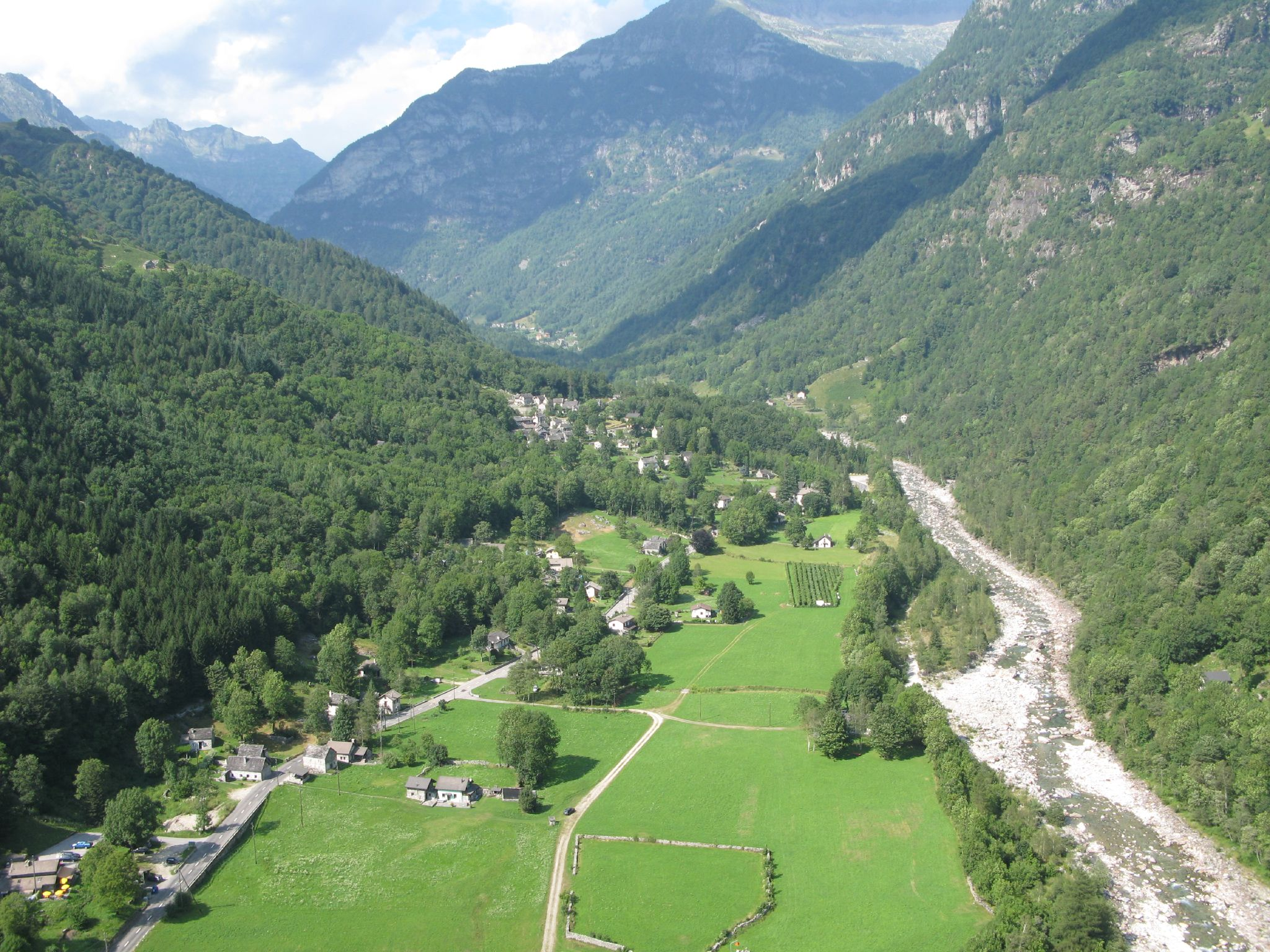
Gerra in the Verzasca valley

Until 1852, it was part of Brione. The exclaves were assigned to Gerra in 1920, when the scattered landholdings of Locarno, Minusio and Mergoscia in the Terricciole plains were separated from the cities. In 1742, the parish of Gerra was created when it separated from Brione. The church of San Giovanni Evangelista already existed in the 15th Century but was destroyed twice: in the late 16th Century by a landslide and 1817 by a flood. The present church dates to 1819. The Church of Sacro Cuore in Gerra Piano was built in 1930. In Gerra Valle there is a mill dating from the 16th century, and a house from 1470.

The inhabitants lived on agriculture and livestock. Since the 14th Century, there have been annual summer cattle drives to the Alpine pastures. They spent the winters in the Magadino or Sottoceneri valleys. Due to limited agricultural land, portions of the population has emigrated since the 17th Century. Between 1860 and 1874 about a quarter of the population emigrated. In the late 20th and early 21st Centuries the population rose due to the development of Gerra Piano to an important local center. However, in the valley the population has declined.

== Demographics ==
Cugnasco-Gerra has a population (as of December 2020) of 2,780.

As of 2008, the gender distribution of the population was 49.6% male and 50.4% female. The population was made up of 1,194 Swiss men (41.7% of the population), and 227 (7.9%) non-Swiss men. There were 1,269 Swiss women (44.3%), and 173 (6.0%) non-Swiss women.

In 2008 there were 29 live births to Swiss citizens and 3 births to non-Swiss citizens, and in same time span there were 18 deaths of Swiss citizens. Ignoring immigration and emigration, the population of Swiss citizens increased by 11 while the foreign population increased by 3. There were 2 Swiss men who immigrated back to Switzerland and 1 Swiss woman who emigrated from Switzerland. At the same time, there were 10 non-Swiss men and 12 non-Swiss women who immigrated from another country to Switzerland. The total Swiss population change in 2008 (from all sources) was an increase of 74 and the non-Swiss population change was an increase of 38 people. This represents a population growth rate of 4.2%.

The age distribution, as of 2009, in Cugnasco-Gerra is; 341 children or 11.9% of the population are between 0 and 9 years old and 322 teenagers or 11.2% are between 10 and 19. Of the adult population, 242 people or 8.5% of the population are between 20 and 29 years old. 394 people or 13.8% are between 30 and 39, 562 people or 19.6% are between 40 and 49, and 385 people or 13.4% are between 50 and 59. The senior population distribution is 328 people or 11.5% of the population are between 60 and 69 years old, 180 people or 6.3% are between 70 and 79, there are 109 people or 3.8% who are over 80.

== Education ==
In Cugnasco-Gerra there were a total of 582 students (as of 2009). The Ticino education system provides up to three years of non-mandatory kindergarten and in Cugnasco-Gerra there were 101 children in kindergarten. The primary school program lasts for five years and includes both a standard school and a special school. In the municipality, 180 students attended the standard primary schools and 8 students attended the special school. In the lower secondary school system, students either attend a two-year middle school followed by a two-year pre-apprenticeship or they attend a four-year program to prepare for higher education. There were 164 students in the two-year middle school, while 54 students were in the four-year advanced program.

The upper secondary school includes several options, but at the end of the upper secondary program, a student will be prepared to enter a trade or to continue on to a university or college. In Ticino, vocational students may either attend school while working on their internship or apprenticeship (which takes three or four years) or may attend school followed by an internship or apprenticeship (which takes one year as a full-time student or one and a half to two years as a part-time student). There were 22 vocational students who were attending school full-time and 52 who attend part-time.

The professional program lasts three years and prepares a student for a job in engineering, nursing, computer science, business, tourism and similar fields. There was 1 student in the professional program.

== Crime ==
In 2014 the crime rate, of the over 200 crimes listed in the Swiss Criminal Code (running from murder, robbery and assault to accepting bribes and election fraud), in Cugnasco-Gerra was 65.9 per thousand residents, slightly higher than the national average (64.6 per thousand). During the same period, the rate of drug crimes was 8.6 per thousand residents (9.9 nationally). The rate of violations of immigration, visa and work permit laws was 5.9 per thousand residents. This rate is 126.9% greater than the rate in the district, 63.9% greater than the rate in the canton and about 20% greater than the national average.

== Economy ==
As of 2009, there were 4 hotels in Cugnasco-Gerra.

== Heritage sites of national significance ==
The Oratory of SS. Anna e Cristoforo a Curogna and the Oratory of S. Martino a Ditto are listed as Swiss heritage site of national significance.

== Historic Population ==
The historical population is given in the following table:

Year	Population Cugnasco	Population Gerra (Verzasca)
1591	285	-
1760	325	-
1801	279	304
1850	349	-
1870	-	186
1900	433	413
1960	428	-
1990	821	-
2000	1,120	1,098
