= Tschingelsee =

Lake in the valley Kiental of the canton of Bern, Switzerland

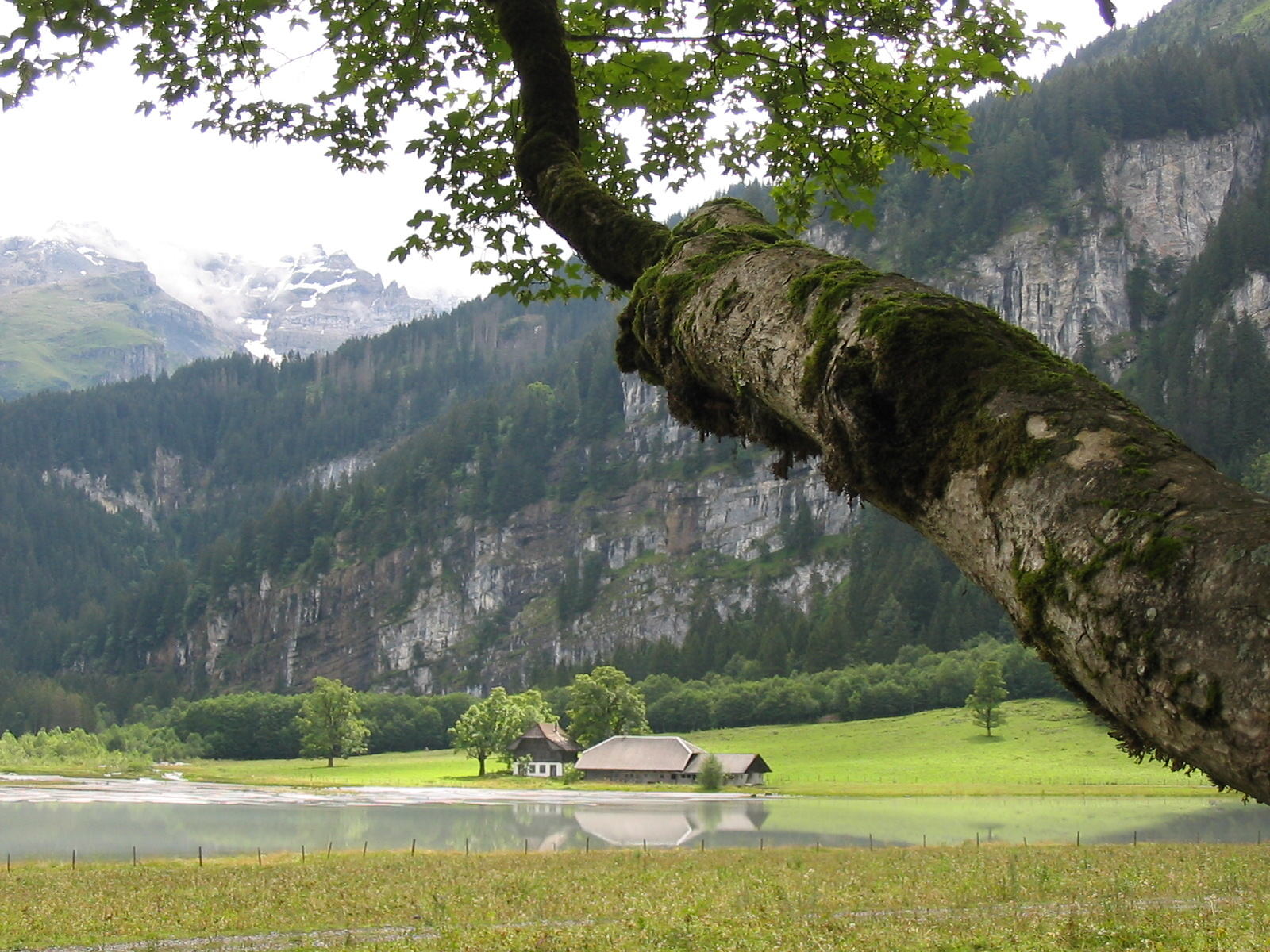

- Location within Canton of Bern Location within Switzerland Location within Alps
- Interactive map of Tschingelsee
- Location: Canton of Bern
- Coordinates: 46°33′08″N 7°44′36″E
- Basin countries: Switzerland
- Surface area: 7.10 ha (17.5 acres)
- Surface elevation: 1,153 m (3,783 ft)

Tschingelsee is a lake in the valley Kiental of the canton of Bern, Switzerland.Tschingelsee was formed in 1972 when a debris flow from the Ärmighorn slopes dammed the Gornernbach.
