= Valsorey Glacier =

Glacier in Switzerland

Coordinates: 45°54′42″N 7°16′11″E

The Valsorey Glacier (French: Glacier de Valsorey) is a 3.5 km long glacier (2005) situated in the Pennine Alps in the canton of Valais in Switzerland. In 1973 it had an area of 2.37 km².

== See also ==
- List of glaciers in Switzerland
- Swiss Alps
