= Villars-sous-Mont =

Former municipality, canton of Fribourg

- Former municipality
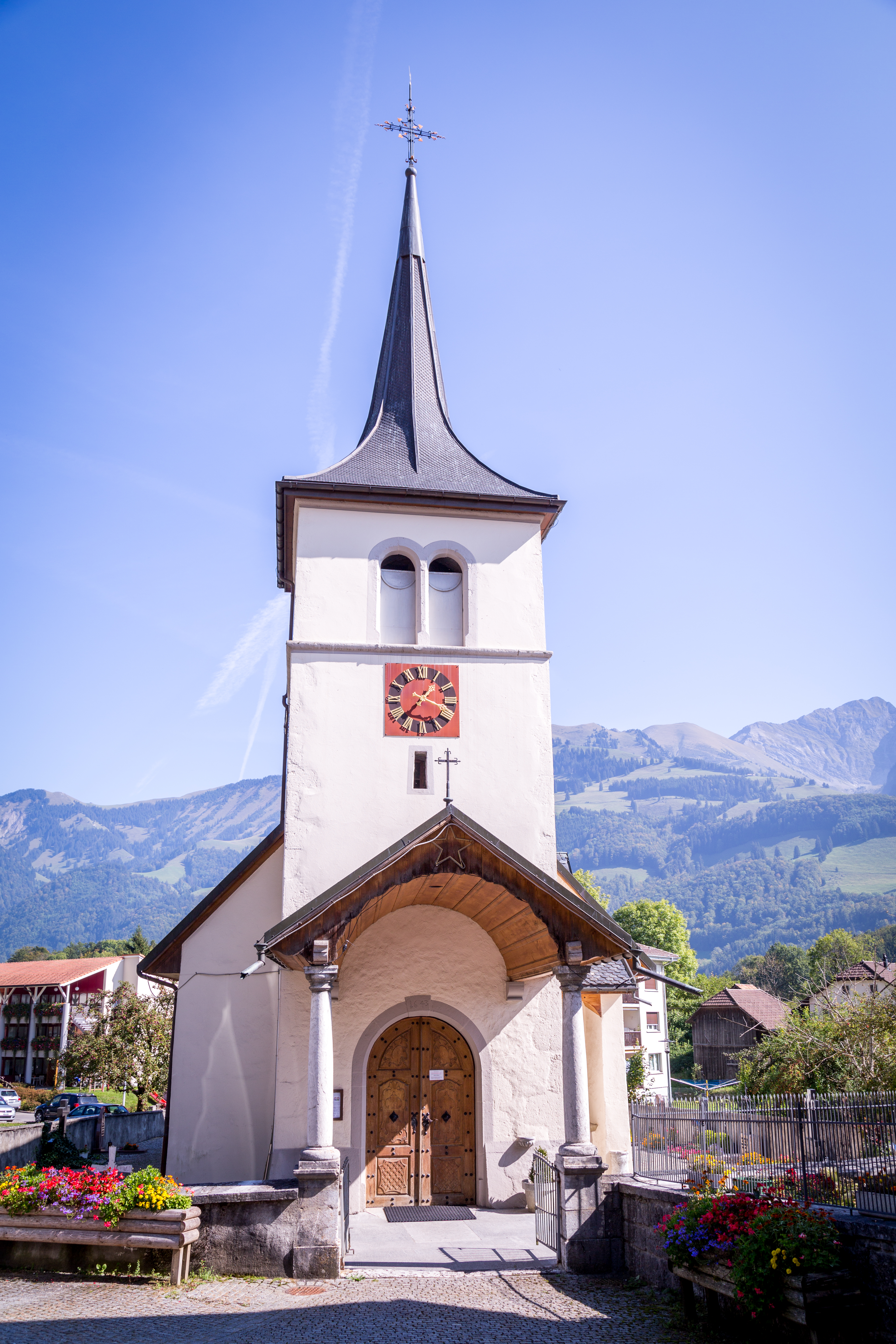
- Church of Saints Simon and Jude

- Coat of arms
- Location of Villars-sous-Mont
- Location within Switzerland Location within Canton of Fribourg
- Coordinates: 46.5398°N 7.0694°E
- Country: Switzerland
- Canton: Fribourg
- District: Gruyère
- Municipality: Bas-Intyamon

Population (2000)
  - Total: 207
- Time zone: UTC+01:00 (CET)
  - Summer (DST): UTC+02:00 (CEST)
- ISO 3166 code: CH-FR
- Website

Villars-sous-Mont (old German name Wiler am Berg) is a former municipality in the Gruyère district of the canton of Fribourg, Switzerland. In 2004 it merged with Enney and Estavannens to form the municipality of Bas-Intyamon. It lies on the left bank of the Sarine, on the cantonal road from Bulle to Montbovon.

== History ==
Villars-sous-Mont is first mentioned in 1254 as Villard-Symon. Archaeological finds include a Mesolithic campsite and an inhumation grave from the Early Bronze Age. In 1254 the village was mentioned in a dispute between the chapter of Lausanne and the count of Gruyère. It was part of the county of Gruyère and, like all the villages of the castellany, was freed from mainmorte in 1388. It became the property of Fribourg in 1555 and belonged to the bailiwick of Gruyère, and from 1798 to the district of the same name.

In church matters, Villars-sous-Mont was a dependency of the parish of Gruyères; its chapel, dedicated to Saints Simon and Jude, was consecrated in 1654 and restored in 2000. Villars-sous-Mont became a parish in 1786, and in 2006 it was united with Enney and Estavannens in the parish of Bas-Intyamon. The chapel of Notre-Dame-Auxiliatrice dates from 1897 and was renovated in 1992–1993.

The village is on the Bulle–Montbovon railway line (1903). Its economy comprised agriculture (alpine pastures, cheese), the manufacture of kitchen fittings (1961) and gravel extraction. The Home de l'Intyamon, a home for the elderly, dates from 1990.

Villars-sous-Mont had 94 inhabitants in 1811, 112 in 1850, 120 in 1900, 110 in 1950 and 207 in 2000. In 2004 it merged with Enney and Estavannens to form Bas-Intyamon.

== Bibliography ==
- J.-H. Thorin, Notice historique sur Villars-sous-Mont, 1876
- La Liberté, 28 November 1960; 12 and 20–22 December 1960; 10, 12 and 14–18 January 1961
- Fribourg illustré, 1992, no. 17, pp. 27–31

=== Archives ===
- Card index (Fichier), State Archives of Fribourg (Archives de l'État de Fribourg)
