= Gerra (Verzasca) =

- Former municipality
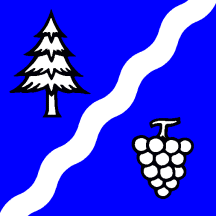
- Flag Coat of arms
- Location of Gerra (Verzasca)
- Location within Switzerland Location within Canton of Ticino
- Coordinates: 46°19′N 8°48′E
- Country: Switzerland
- Canton: Ticino
- District: Locarno
- Municipality: Cugnasco-Gerra

Area
  - Total: 16.18 km^{2} (6.25 sq mi)
- Elevation: 826 m (2,710 ft)

Population (December 2004)
  - Total: 1,192
  - Density: 73.67/km^{2} (190.8/sq mi)
- Time zone: UTC+01:00 (CET)
  - Summer (DST): UTC+02:00 (CEST)
- Postal code: 6516
- SFOS number: 5107
- ISO 3166 code: CH-TI
- Localities: Agarone, Gerra Piano, Piandesso, Riazzino
- Website: www.gerraverzasca.ch

Gerra (Verzasca) is a part of the municipality of Cugnasco-Gerra in the district of Locarno in the canton of Ticino in Switzerland.

Gerra was an independent municipality until January 1, 2009, when it merged with Cugnasco to form Cugnasco-Gerra.

== Location ==
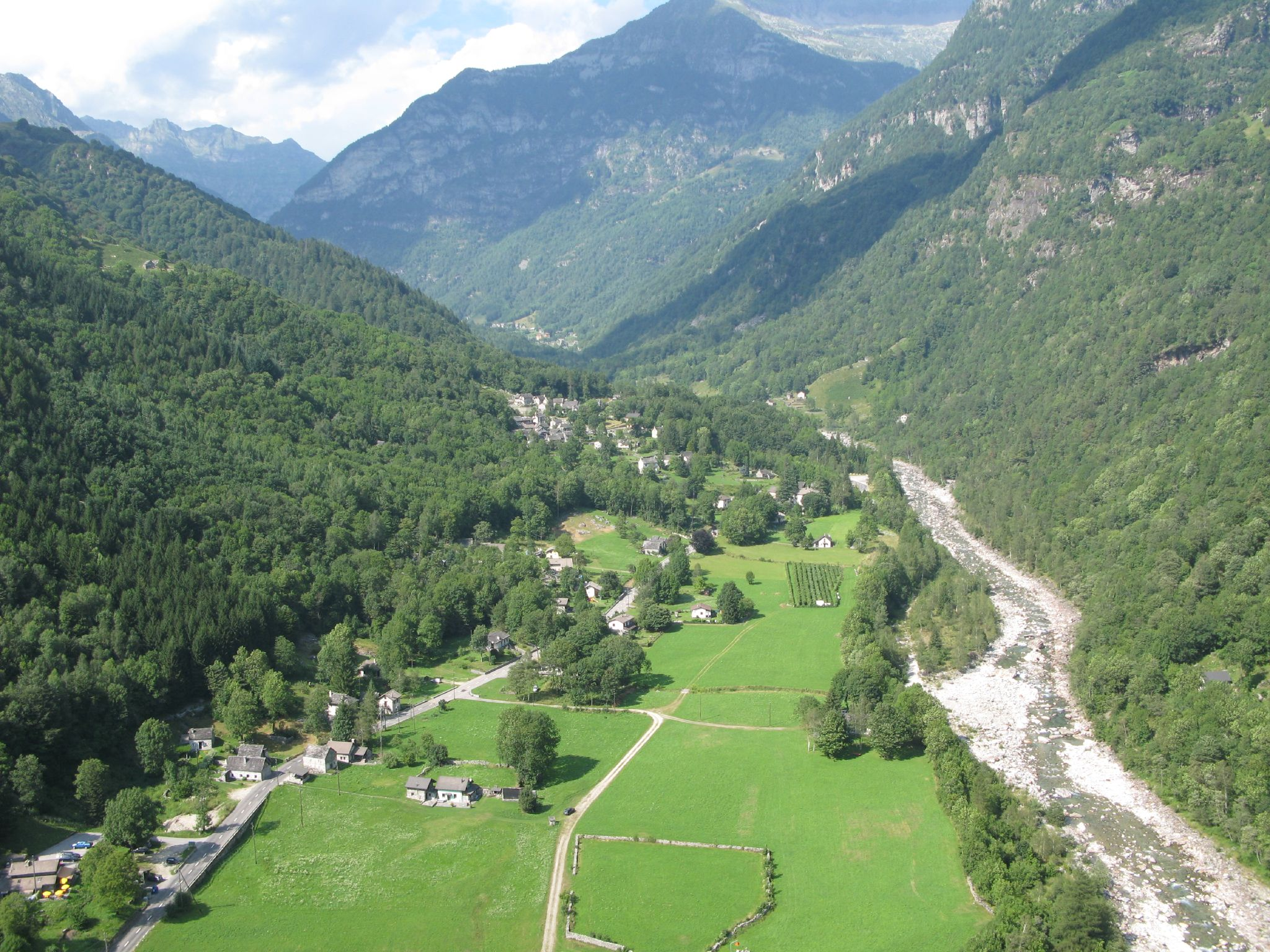
Gerra in the Verzasca valley

It consisted of Gerra Piano and Agarone, exclaves in the Magadino Plain, and the main part (Gerra Valle) of the municipality in the Verzasca valley.

== History ==
Gerra is first mentioned in 1387 as Giera. Until 1852, it was part of Brione. The exclaves were assigned to Gerra in 1920, when the scattered landholdings of Locarno, Minusio and Mergoscia in the Terricciole plains were separated from the cities. In 1742, the parish of Gerra was created when it separated from Brione. The church of San Giovanni Evangelista already existed in the 15th Century but was destroyed twice: in the late 16th Century by a landslide and 1817 by a flood. The present church dates to 1819. The Church of Sacro Cuore in Gerra Piano was built in 1930. In Gerra Valle there is a mill dating from the 16th century, and a house from 1470.

The inhabitants lived on agriculture and livestock. Since the 14th Century, there have been annual summer cattle drives to the Alpine pastures. They spent the winters in the Magadino or Sottoceneri valleys. Due to limited agricultural land, portions of the population has emigrated since the 17th Century. Between 1860 and 1874 about a quarter of the population emigrated. In the late 20th and early 21st Centuries the population rose due to the development of Gerra Piano to an important local center. However, in the valley the population has declined.

== Historic population ==
The historical population is given in the following table:

Year	Population Gerra (Verzasca)
1801	304
1870	186
1900	413
1950	451
2000	1,098
