= Gravas =

Gravas is a surname. Notable people with the surname include:

- Dimitris Gravas (born 1993), Greek basketball player
- Mark Gravas (born 1966), Australian animator, director, and producer
