= Enney =

Former municipality, canton of Fribourg

- Former municipality
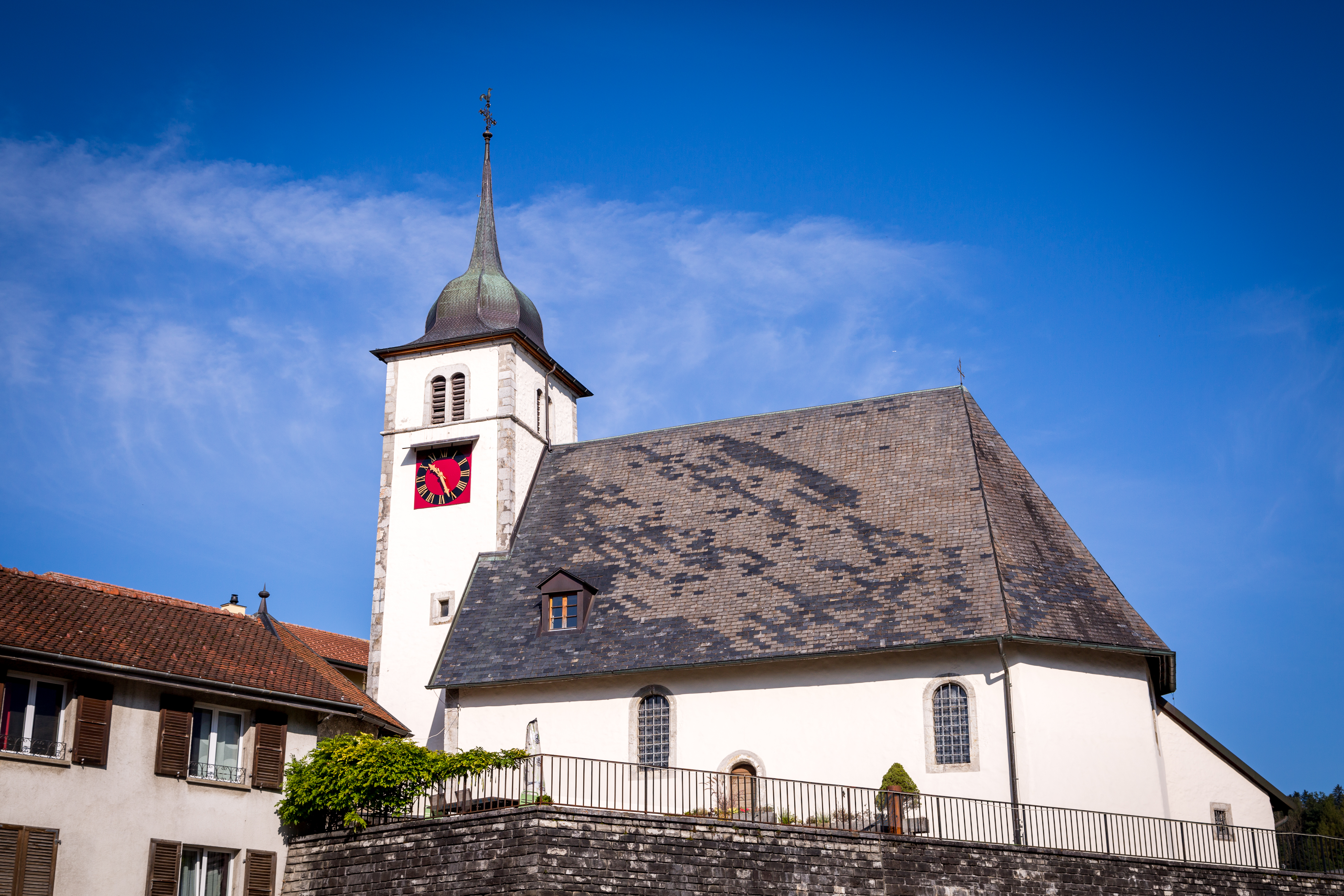
- Church of Saint Nicholas of Flüe

- Coat of arms
- Location of Enney
- Location within Switzerland Location within Canton of Fribourg
- Coordinates: 46.566664°N 7.083325°E
- Country: Switzerland
- Canton: Fribourg
- District: Gruyère
- Municipality: Bas-Intyamon

Population (2000)
  - Total: 459
- Time zone: UTC+01:00 (CET)
  - Summer (DST): UTC+02:00 (CEST)
- ISO 3166 code: CH-FR
- Website

Enney is a former municipality in the Gruyère district of the canton of Fribourg, Switzerland. In 2004 it merged with Estavannens and Villars-sous-Mont to form the municipality of Bas-Intyamon. It lies on the left bank of the Sarine, on the cantonal road from Bulle to Montbovon.

== History ==
Enney is first mentioned in 1224 as Eiz. A Bronze Age grave was discovered there in 1915. In 1307 Count Pierre of Gruyère assigned the tithe of Enney to the monastery of La Part-Dieu. Count Rodolphe IV freed Enney from mainmorte in 1388. From 1555 Enney belonged to Fribourg and was part of the bailiwick of Gruyère. Communal statutes date from 1562 and 1760.

Enney belonged to the parish of Gruyères until 1947, when the chapel of the Virgin (1619) was made the parish church. From the 17th century, with the rise of pasture farming, Enney took part in the trade in Gruyère cheese. At the end of the 19th century, major works corrected the bed of the Sarine and gave agriculture additional land. Agriculture remained the main sector until quarries and small businesses (electronics, food, concrete) widened the range of economic activity. Since 1903 Enney has had a stop on the Châtel-Saint-Denis–Montbovon railway line.

Enney had 212 inhabitants in 1811, 224 in 1850, 414 in 1900, 324 in 1930, 343 in 1950, 293 in 1960 and 459 in 2000. In 2004 it merged with Estavannens and Villars-sous-Mont to form Bas-Intyamon.

== Bibliography ==
- A. Dellion, Dictionnaire historique et statistique des paroisses catholiques du canton de Fribourg, vols. 7–8, pp. 37–38
