= Cugnasco =

- Former municipality
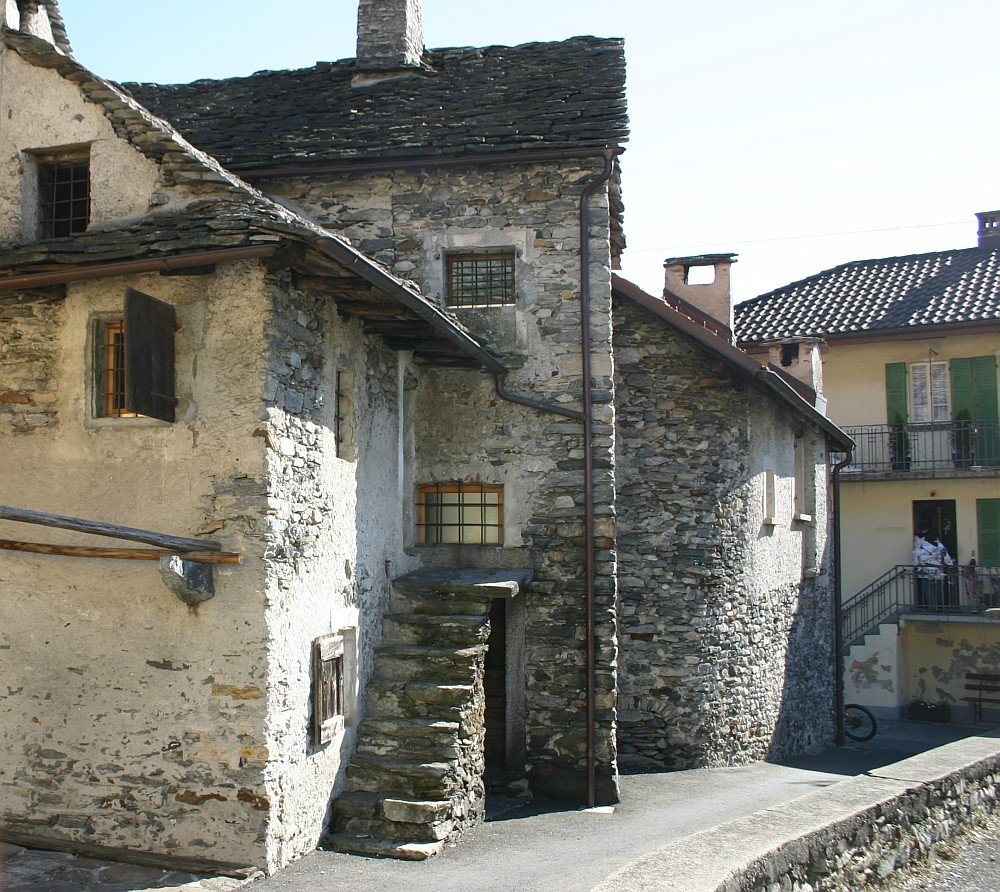
- Cugnasco village

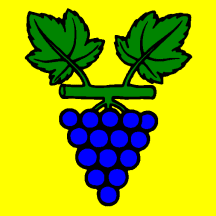
- Flag Coat of arms
- Location of Cugnasco
- Location within Switzerland Location within Canton of Ticino
- Coordinates: 46°11′N 8°55′E
- Country: Switzerland
- Canton: Ticino
- District: Locarno
- Municipality: Cugnasco-Gerra

Area
  - Total: 17.1 km^{2} (6.6 sq mi)
- Elevation: 225 m (738 ft)

Population (2006)
  - Total: 1,269
  - Density: 74.2/km^{2} (192/sq mi)
- Time zone: UTC+01:00 (CET)
  - Summer (DST): UTC+02:00 (CEST)
- Postal code: 6516
- SFOS number: 5104
- ISO 3166 code: CH-TI
- Localities: Bosco, Boscioredo, Massarescio, Medoscio, Moncucco, Pianrestello, Sciarana, La Monda
- Website: www.cugnasco.ch

Cugnasco is a village in the municipality Cugnasco-Gerra of the district of Locarno in the canton of Ticino in Switzerland.

Cugnasco had a population of nearly 1300.

Cugnasco was an independent municipality until January 1, 2009, when it merged with Gerra (Verzasca) to form Cugnasco-Gerra.

== Location ==
Cugnasco is on the outskirts of the Magadino valley. It includes the settlements of Boscioredo, Cugnasco, Bosco, Massarescio, Medoscio, Moncucco, Pianrestello and Sciarana.

== History ==
Cugnasco is first mentioned in 1374 as Cunyascho. Today's mountain pastures of Ditto and Curogna are the oldest settlements of the municipality. The settlements in the marshy Ticino river floodplain, developed later. The present village developed mainly due to the herders who brought their cattle down into the Magadino valley for the winter. In the 13th and 14th Centuries there was a migration from Verzasca valley and about 150 inhabitants of Ditto and Curogna moved down into the valley. Cugnasco grew into a center of community life for the surrounding settlements.

As Cugnasco grew, a Servite monastery grew up as well. In 1653, the monastery was closed. However, the Chapel of the Beata Vergine delle Grazie continued to serve for the inhabitants of the plain. Before the chapel, they had to travel to Tenero for worship services. The small 15th Century church, now a heritage site of national significance containing valuable frescoes from the 16th and 17th Century was the goal of many pilgrims from the region.

In 1635-56 the provost's St. Joseph Church was built. It later became a parish center, while Ditto and Curogna still had a Vicariate. Both the chapel of San Martino in Ditto and the SS Cristoforo e Anna in Curogna date from the 14th and 15th Century and contains frescoes from various periods.

Cugnasco was located at the crossroads of two important trade routes from Locarno to Bellinzona and from Cugnasco to Contone, which was near the so-called Porto sul Ticino, a river crossing. After the collapse of the bridge at Bellinzona in 1515, this second route became nearly the only way across the river. Historically, the economy of Cugnasco relied nearly exclusively on agriculture and pastoralism. However, by 2000 less than 15% of workers worked in agriculture and about three quarters were commuters.

== Historic population ==
The historical population is given in the following table:

Year	Population Cugnasco
1591	285
1760	325
1801	279
1850	349
1900	433
1960	428
1990	821
2000	1,120
