= Grandvillard =

- Municipality
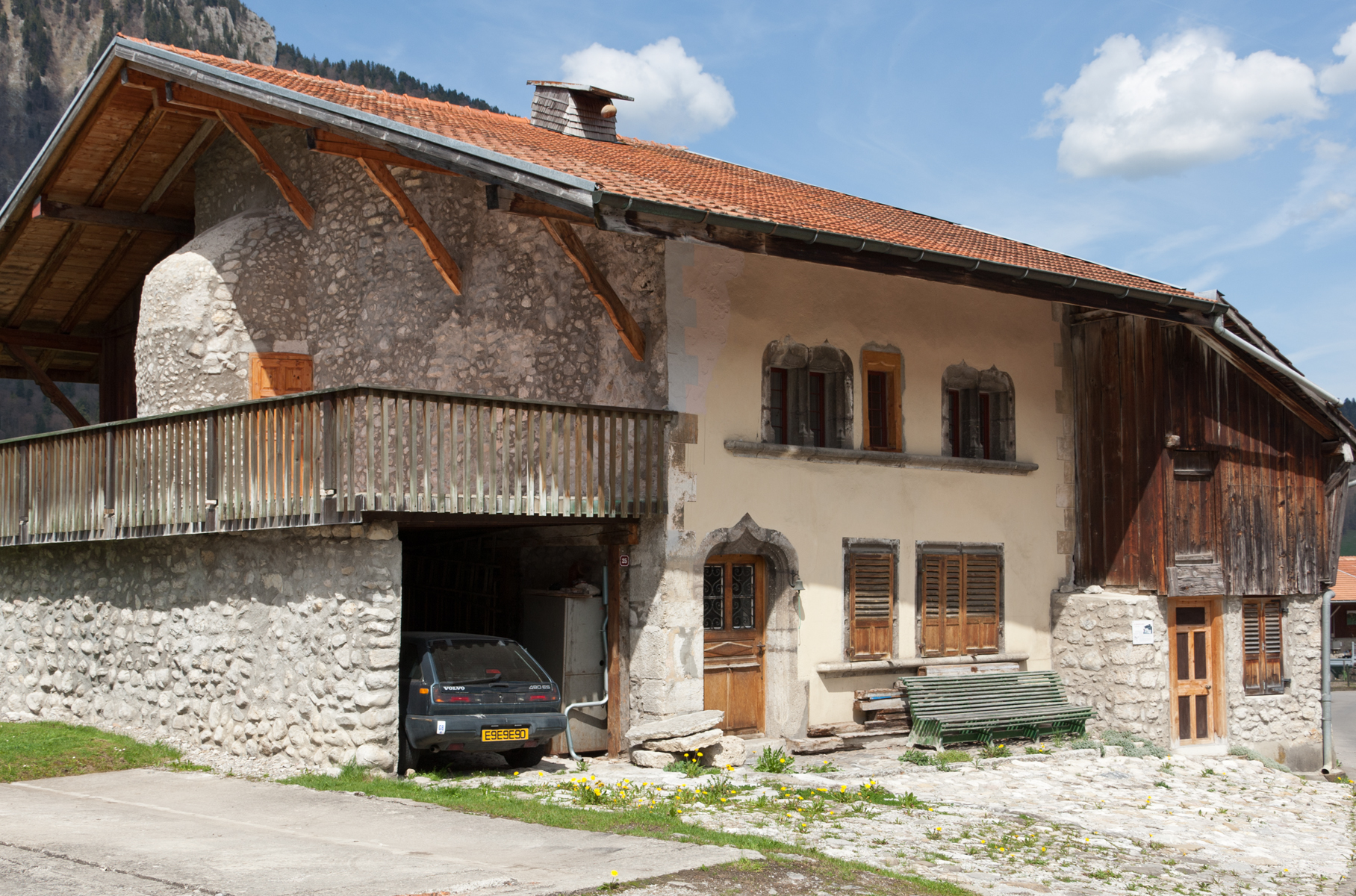
- Maison-des-Comtes in Grandvillard village

- Coat of arms
- Location of Grandvillard
- Location within Switzerland Location within Canton of Fribourg
- Coordinates: 46°32′N 7°5′E
- Country: Switzerland
- Canton: Fribourg
- District: Gruyère

Government
  - Mayor: Syndic

Area
  - Total: 24.22 km^{2} (9.35 sq mi)
- Elevation: 762 m (2,500 ft)

Population (December 2020)
  - Total: 845
  - Density: 34.9/km^{2} (90.4/sq mi)
- Time zone: UTC+01:00 (CET)
  - Summer (DST): UTC+02:00 (CEST)
- Postal code: 1666
- SFOS number: 2134
- ISO 3166 code: CH-FR
- Surrounded by: Bas-Intyamon, Château-d'Œx (VD), Haut-Intyamon, Val-de-Charmey
- Website: www.grandvillard.ch

Grandvillard (French pronunciation: [ɡʁɑ̃vilaʁ]; Arpitan: Le Grandvelârd [lə ɡʁɑ̃vəˈlɑ]) is a municipality in the district of Gruyère in the canton of Fribourg in Switzerland.

== History ==
Grandvillard is first mentioned in 1228 as Vilar. In 1309 it was mentioned as Vilar retro Grueriam and in 1457 as communitas Magni Villari retro Grueriam. The municipality was formerly known by its German names Grosswiler and Langwiler, however, that name is no longer used.

== Geography ==
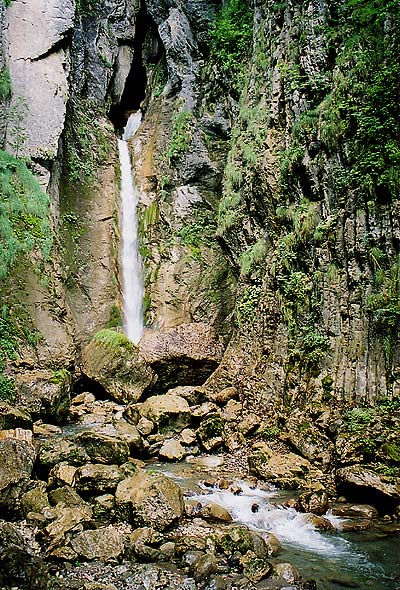
Waterfall near Grandvillard

Aerial view (1964)

Grandvillard has an area, as of 2009, of 24.2 square kilometers (9.3 mi^{2}). Of this area, 11.45 km^{2} (4.42 mi^{2}) or 47.4% is used for agricultural purposes, while 6.89 km^{2} (2.66 mi^{2}) or 28.5% is forested. Of the rest of the land, 0.95 km^{2} (0.37 mi^{2}) or 3.9% is settled (buildings or roads), 0.17 km^{2} (0.066 mi^{2}) or 0.7% is either rivers or lakes and 4.74 km^{2} (1.83 mi^{2}) or 19.6% is unproductive land.

Of the built up area, housing and buildings made up 1.2% and transportation infrastructure made up 1.4%. Out of the forested land, 23.6% of the total land area is heavily forested and 3.3% is covered with orchards or small clusters of trees. Of the agricultural land, 4.2% is used for growing crops and 7.5% is pastures and 35.6% is used for alpine pastures. All the water in the municipality is flowing water. Of the unproductive areas, 11.1% is unproductive vegetation and 8.5% is too rocky for vegetation.

The municipality is located in the Gruyère district, in the Intyamon valley.

== Coat of arms ==
The blazon of the municipal coat of arms is Gules, a Saltire Argent, overall a Crane rising of the last and in chief a Mullet of Five Or.

== Demographics ==
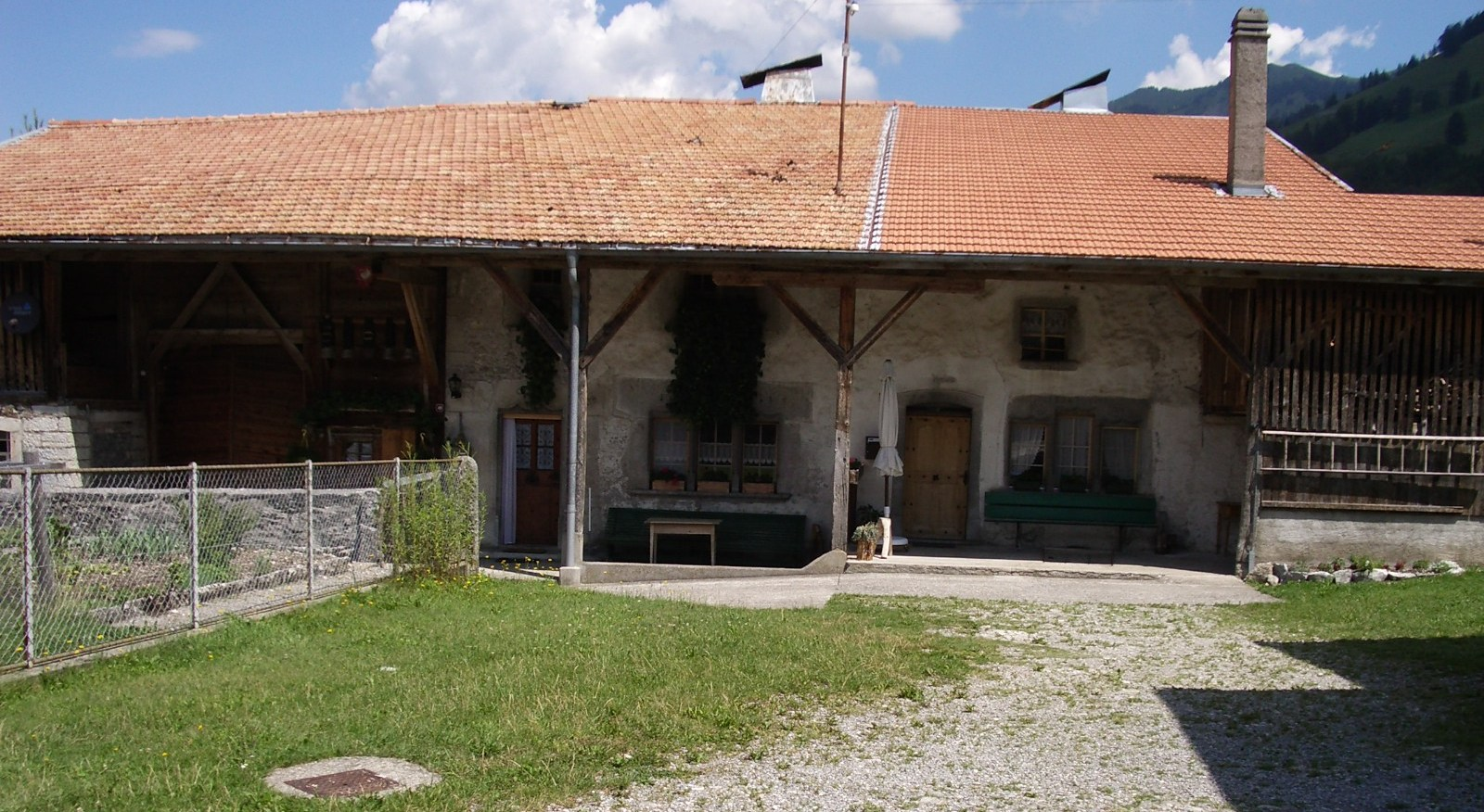
House in Grandvillard

Grandvillard has a population (as of December 2020) of 845. As of 2008, 7.3% of the population are resident foreign nationals. Over the last 10 years (2000–2010) the population has changed at a rate of 11.7%. Migration accounted for 10.7%, while births and deaths accounted for 0.8%.

Most of the population (as of 2000) speaks French (582 or 96.2%) as their first language, German is the second most common (12 or 2.0%) and Portuguese is the third (6 or 1.0%).

As of 2008, the population was 49.7% male and 50.3% female. The population was made up of 299 Swiss men (44.8% of the population) and 33 (4.9%) non-Swiss men. There were 309 Swiss women (46.3%) and 27 (4.0%) non-Swiss women. Of the population in the municipality, 335 or about 55.4% were born in Grandvillard and lived there in 2000. There were 167 or 27.6% who were born in the same canton, while 54 or 8.9% were born somewhere else in Switzerland, and 42 or 6.9% were born outside of Switzerland.

As of 2000, children and teenagers (0–19 years old) make up 27.6% of the population, while adults (20–64 years old) make up 57.2% and seniors (over 64 years old) make up 15.2%.

As of 2000, there were 263 people who were single and never married in the municipality. There were 284 married individuals, 36 widows or widowers and 22 individuals who are divorced.

As of 2000, there were 225 private households in the municipality, and an average of 2.6 persons per household. There were 65 households that consist of only one person and 30 households with five or more people. In 2000, a total of 221 apartments (82.8% of the total) were permanently occupied, while 32 apartments (12.0%) were seasonally occupied and 14 apartments (5.2%) were empty. As of 2009, the construction rate of new housing units was 7.4 new units per 1000 residents.

The historical population is given in the following chart:

== Heritage sites of national significance ==
The Farm House at Route De La Grande-Charrière 32, the House at Route de la Gare 10, the House des Comtes at Rue Saint-Jacques 25, the House du Banneret and the Rangée d’habitations et ruraux are listed as Swiss heritage site of national significance. The entire village of Grandvillard is part of the Inventory of Swiss Heritage Sites.

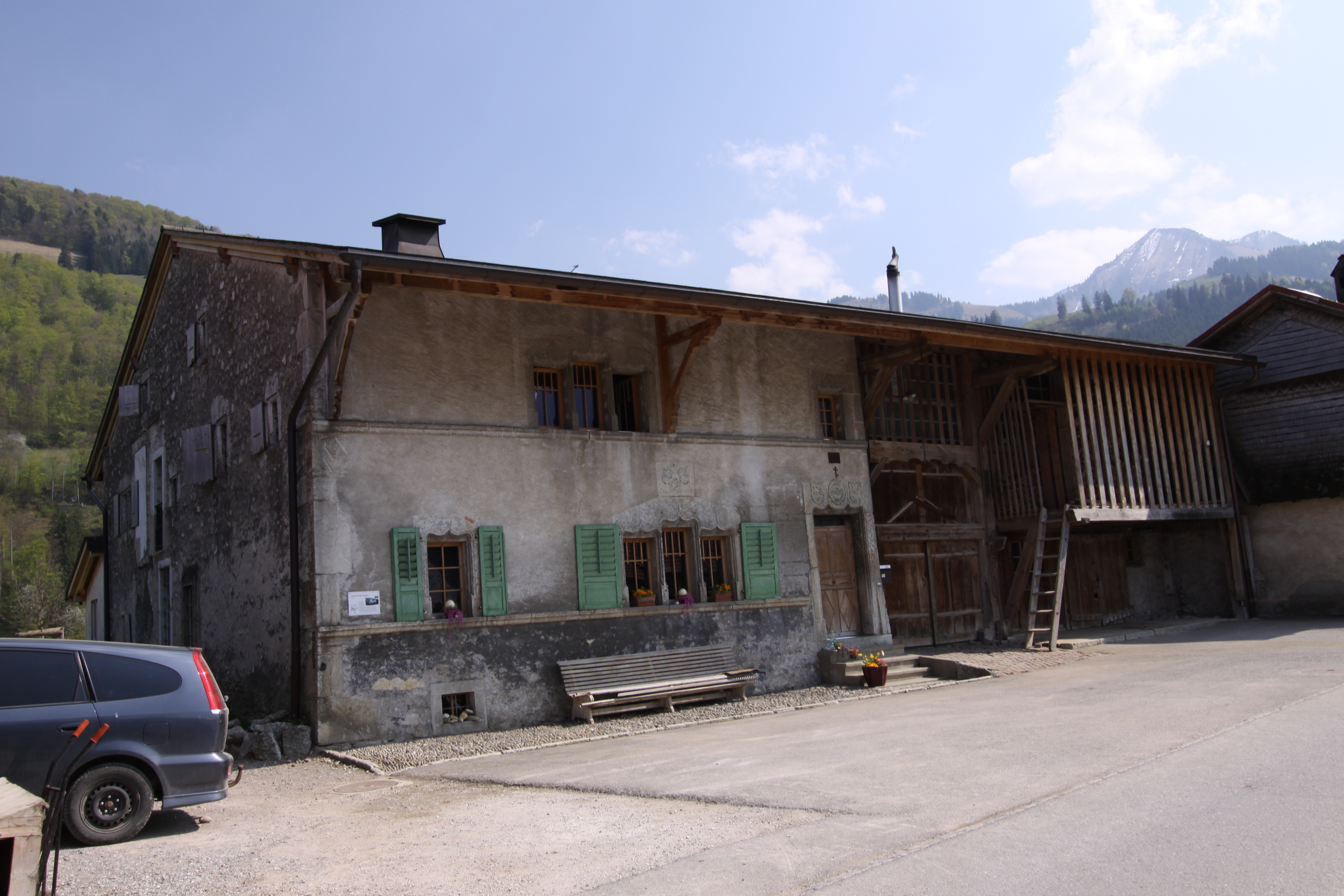
Farm House at Route De La Grande-Charrière 32

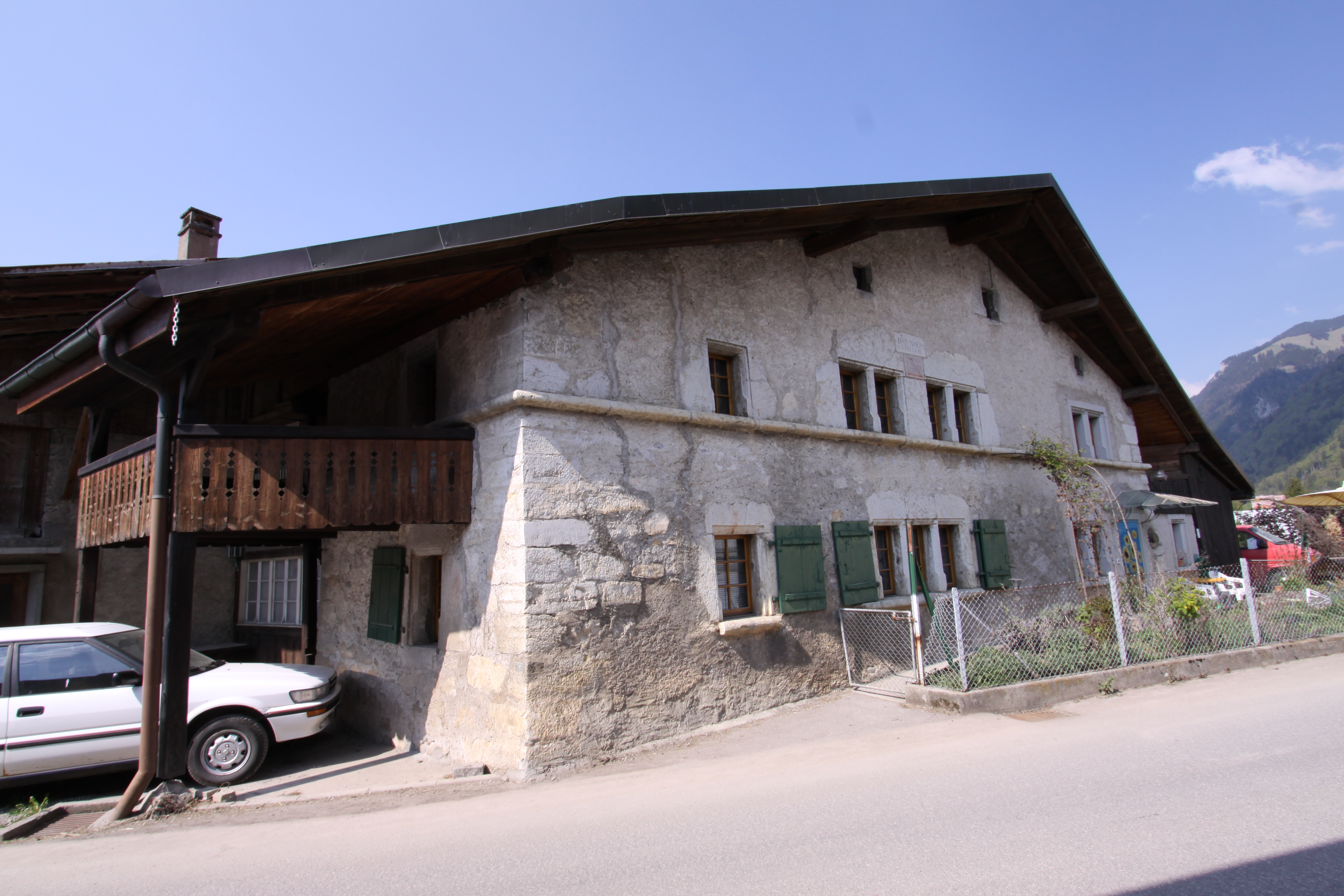
House at Route de la Gare 10

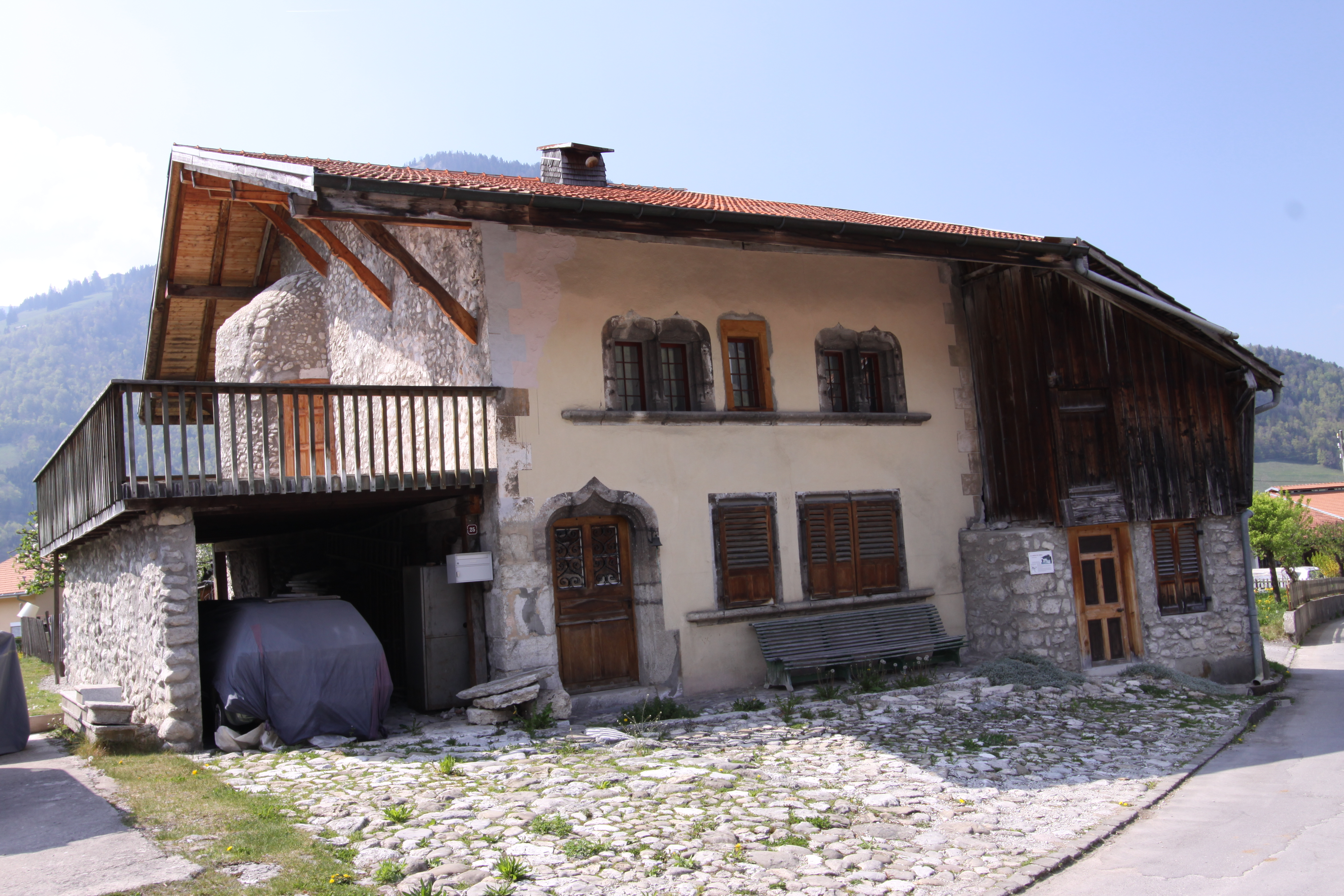
House des Comtes at Rue Saint-Jacques 25

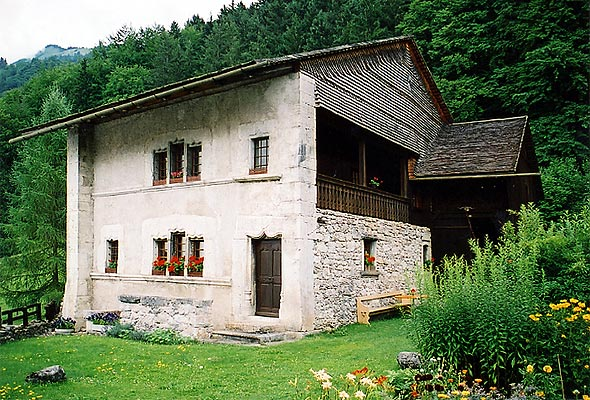
House du Banneret

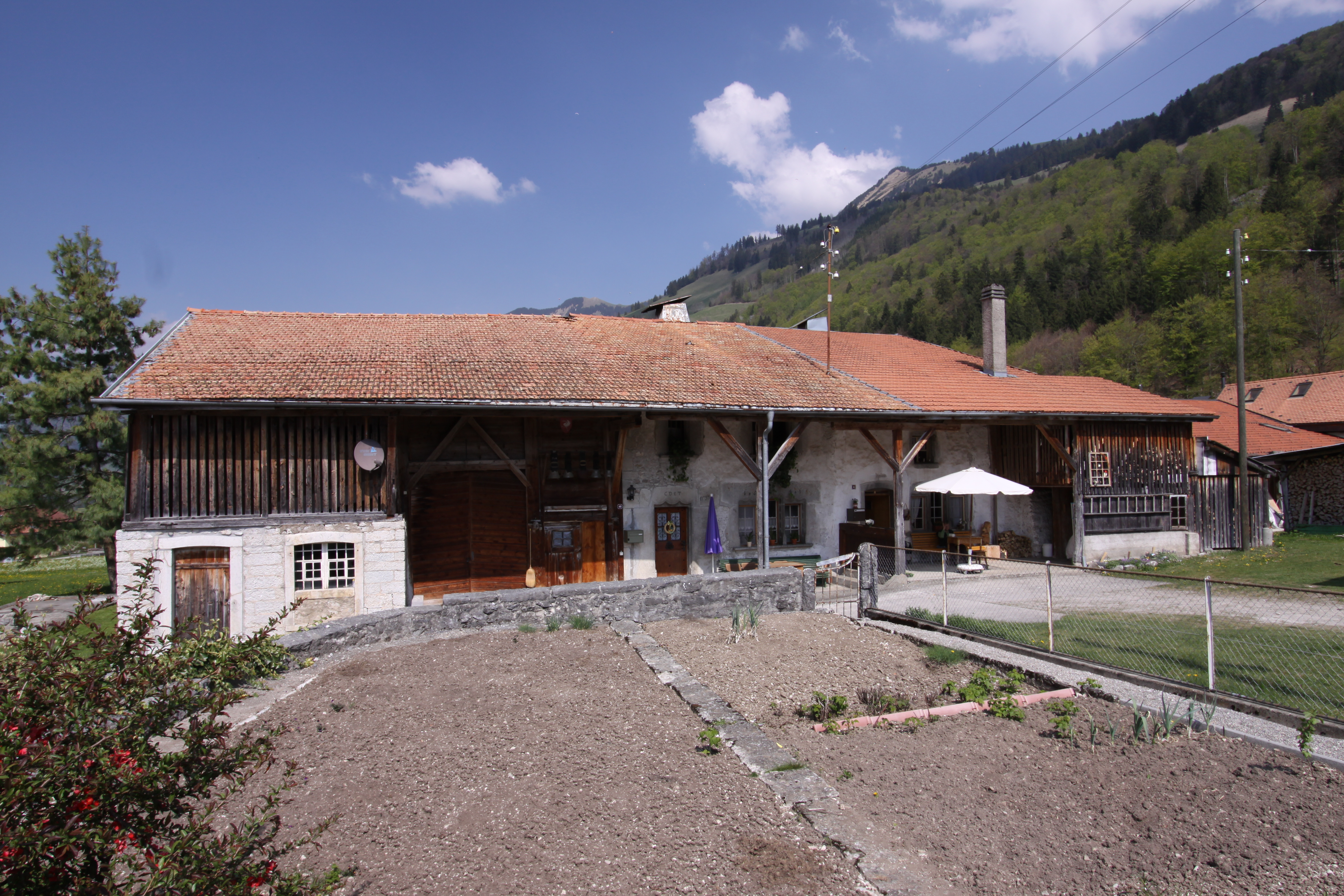
Rangée d’habitations et ruraux

== Politics ==
In the 2011 federal election the most popular party was the CVP which received 26.7% of the vote. The next three most popular parties were the SP (25.1%), the FDP (19.4%) and the SVP (19.3%).

The CVP lost about 17.0% of the vote when compared to the 2007 Federal election (43.7% in 2007 vs 26.7% in 2011). The SPS gained popularity (17.9% in 2007), the FDP retained about the same popularity (16.8% in 2007) and the SVP retained about the same popularity (14.7% in 2007). A total of 268 votes were cast in this election, of which 6 or 2.2% were invalid.

== Economy ==
As of 2010, Grandvillard had an unemployment rate of 1.7%. As of 2008, there were 34 people employed in the primary economic sector and about 12 businesses involved in this sector. 32 people were employed in the secondary sector and there were 9 businesses in this sector. 78 people were employed in the tertiary sector, with 18 businesses in this sector. There were 290 residents of the municipality who were employed in some capacity, of which females made up 35.9% of the workforce.

In 2008 the total number of full-time equivalent jobs was 110. The number of jobs in the primary sector was 25, of which 22 were in agriculture and 3 were in forestry or lumber production. The number of jobs in the secondary sector was 28 of which 10 or (35.7%) were in manufacturing, 11 or (39.3%) were in mining and 7 (25.0%) were in construction. The number of jobs in the tertiary sector was 57. In the tertiary sector; 25 or 43.9% were in wholesale or retail sales or the repair of motor vehicles, 3 or 5.3% were in the movement and storage of goods, 8 or 14.0% were in a hotel or restaurant, 1 was in the information industry, 4 or 7.0% were technical professionals or scientists, 5 or 8.8% were in education.

In 2000, there were 40 workers who commuted into the municipality and 175 workers who commuted away. The municipality is a net exporter of workers, with about 4.4 workers leaving the municipality for every one entering. Of the working population, 5.2% used public transportation to get to work, and 62.4% used a private car.

== Religion ==
From the 2000 census, 548 or 90.6% were Roman Catholic, while 19 or 3.1% belonged to the Swiss Reformed Church. Of the rest of the population, there was 1 individual who belongs to the Christian Catholic Church, and there were 8 individuals (or about 1.32% of the population) who belonged to another Christian church. There were 4 (or about 0.66% of the population) who were Islamic. There was 1 person who was Buddhist. 20 (or about 3.31% of the population) belonged to no church, are agnostic or atheist, and 8 individuals (or about 1.32% of the population) did not answer the question.

== Education ==
In Grandvillard about 189 or (31.2%) of the population have completed non-mandatory upper secondary education, and 36 or (6.0%) have completed additional higher education (either university or a Fachhochschule). Of the 36 who completed tertiary schooling, 61.1% were Swiss men, 22.2% were Swiss women, 13.9% were non-Swiss men.

The Canton of Fribourg school system provides one year of non-obligatory Kindergarten, followed by six years of Primary school. This is followed by three years of obligatory lower Secondary school where the students are separated according to ability and aptitude. Following the lower Secondary students may attend a three or four year optional upper Secondary school. The upper Secondary school is divided into gymnasium (university preparatory) and vocational programs. After they finish the upper Secondary program, students may choose to attend a Tertiary school or continue their apprenticeship.

During the 2010-11 school year, there were a total of 76 students attending 4 classes in Grandvillard. A total of 136 students from the municipality attended any school, either in the municipality or outside of it. There was one kindergarten class with a total of 23 students in the municipality. The municipality had 3 primary classes and 53 students. During the same year, there were no lower secondary classes in the municipality, but 31 students attended lower secondary school in a neighboring municipality. There were no upper Secondary classes or vocational classes, but there were 10 upper Secondary students and 23 upper Secondary vocational students who attended classes in another municipality. The municipality had no non-university Tertiary classes, but there were 2 specialized Tertiary students who attended classes in another municipality.

As of 2000, there were 51 students in Grandvillard who came from another municipality, while 64 residents attended schools outside the municipality.
