= Grand Désert =

Glacier in Switzerland

Coordinates: 46°4′5″N 7°20′32″E

The Grand Désert is a 2 km long glacier (2005) situated on the Rosablanche in the Pennine Alps in the canton of Valais in Switzerland. In 1973 it had an area of 1.89 km^{2}. The lake feeds Lac du Grand Désert.

== See also ==
- List of glaciers in Switzerland
- Swiss Alps
