= Fabbrica di Cioccolato Cima Norma =

Former chocolate factory in Dangio-Torre, Switzerland

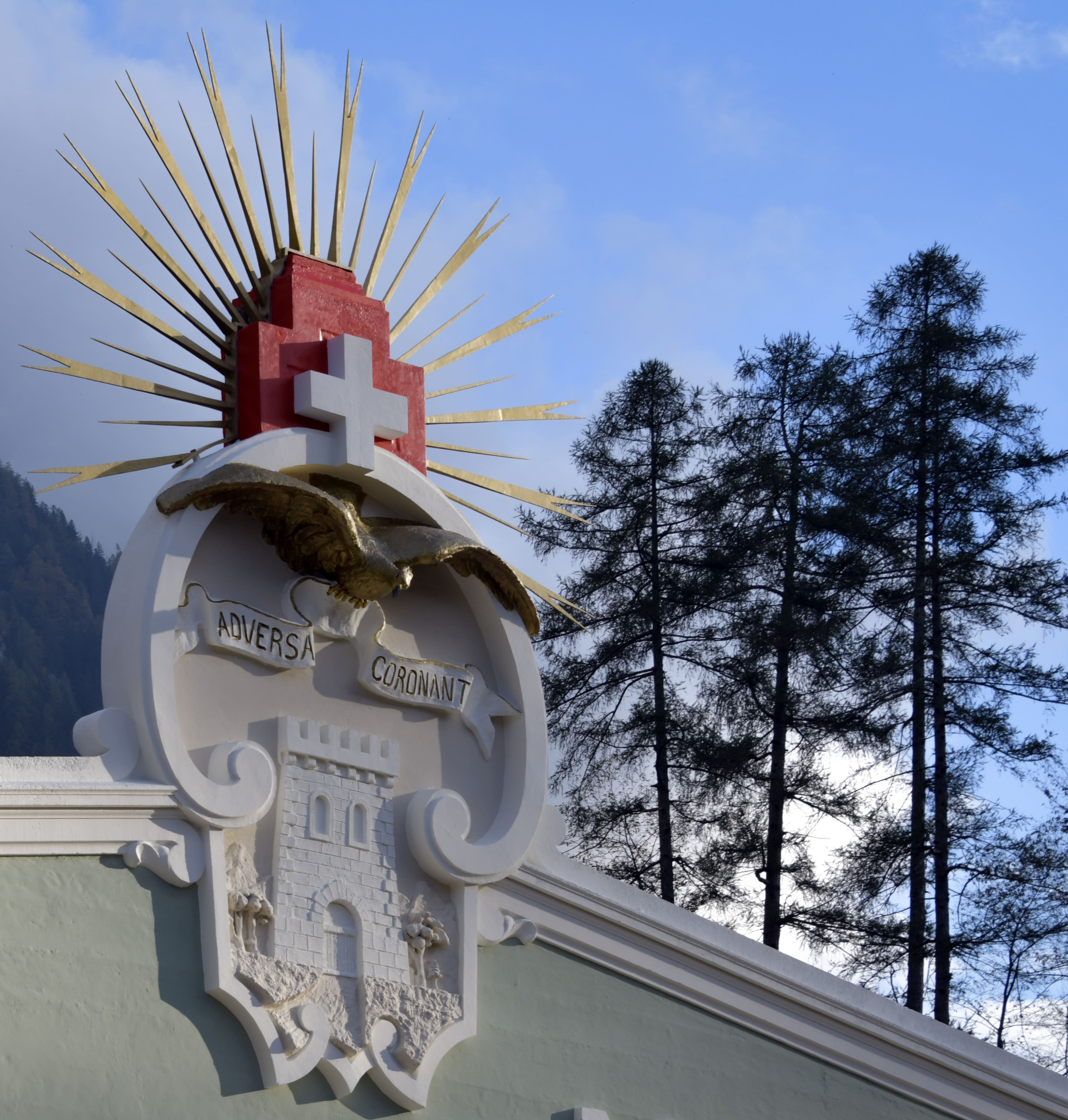
Shield of CimaNorma atop the historical building in Dangio-Torre, Switzerland.

§The Fabbrica di Cioccolato CimaNorma S.A., also Chocolat Cima-Norma S.A., in Dangio- Torre (today Blenio municipality) was an industrial chocolate production company in the canton of Ticino. It was founded in 1903 by the Cima brothers and closed its doors in 1968. The company CimaNorma S.A. also stands for the economic development and modernization advancement goal from the beginning of the 20th century for the mountain valley Blenio Valley, which was classified as a peripheral region.

CimaNorma manufactured all products related to cocoa; from chocolate powder to chocolate bars. The factory complex, still in existence today, is located at the entrance of the Val Soia, at the foot of the Rheinwaldhorn massif.

A foundation promoting culture, La Fabbrica del Cioccolato, was established in 2016. It offers space in the former industrial complex for creators of contemporary art. At the end of August 2020, the Cima Norma Art Festival took place for the first time.

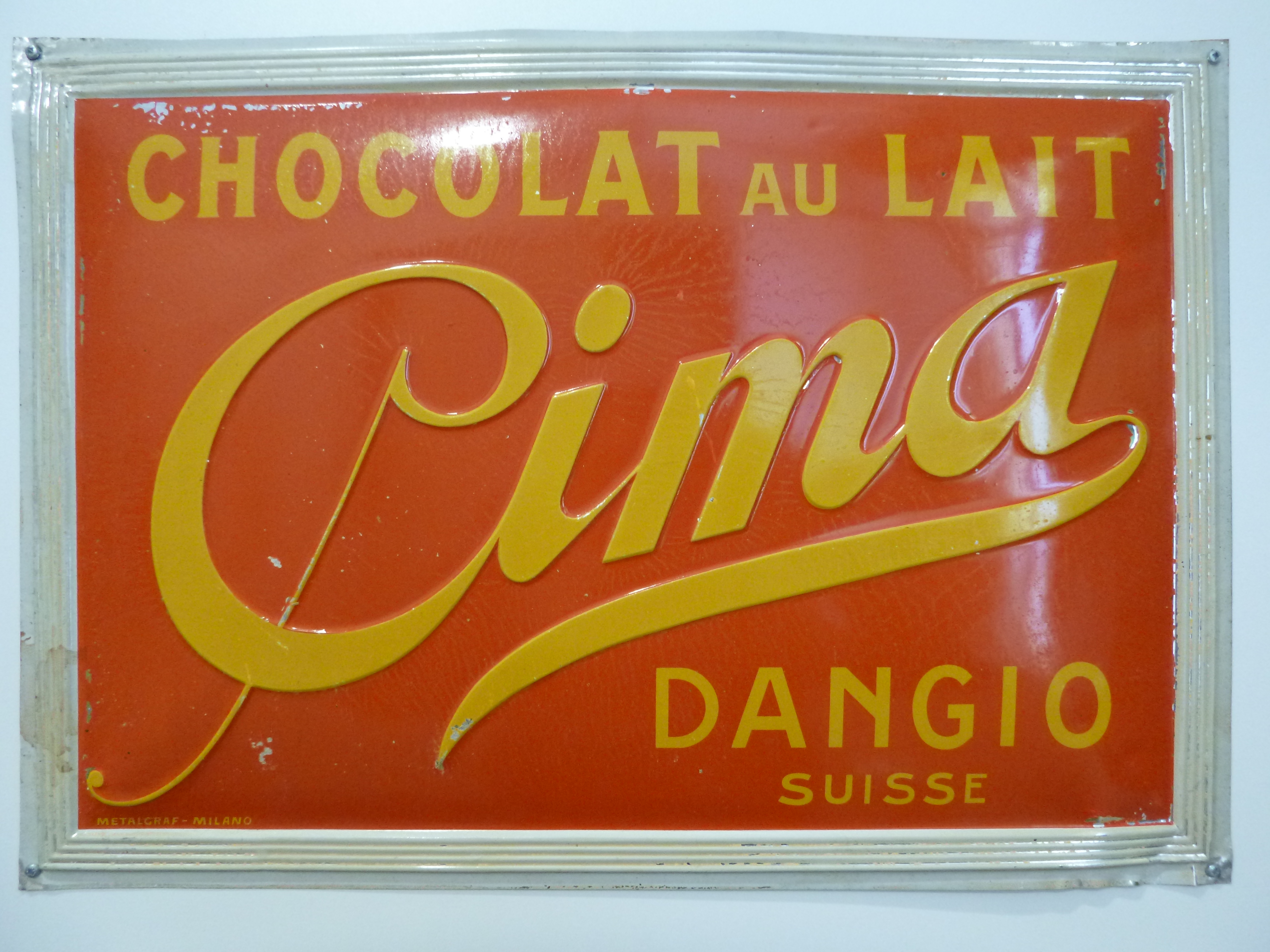
Product sales advertising sign

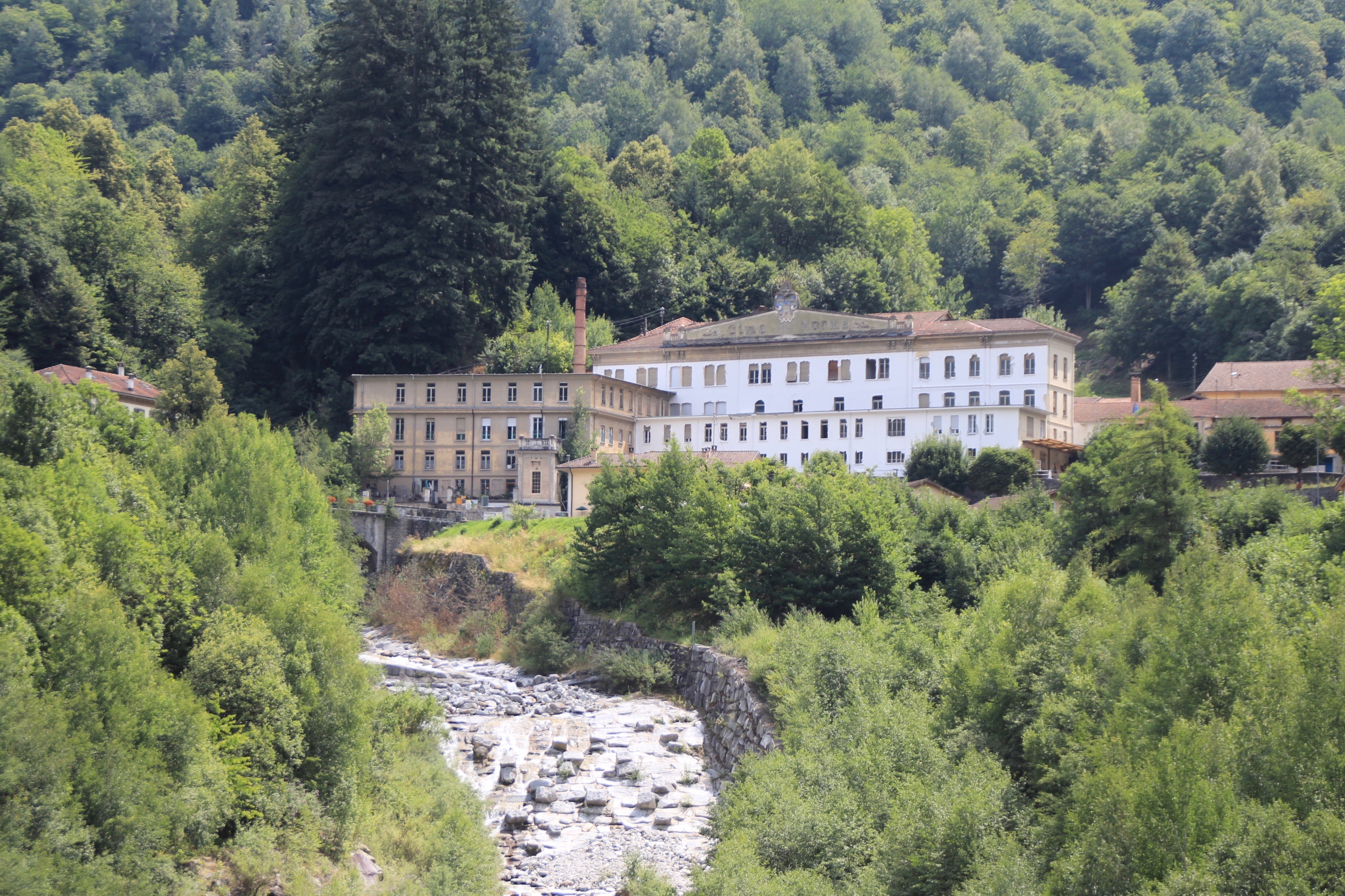
The buildings of Cima-Norma S.A.

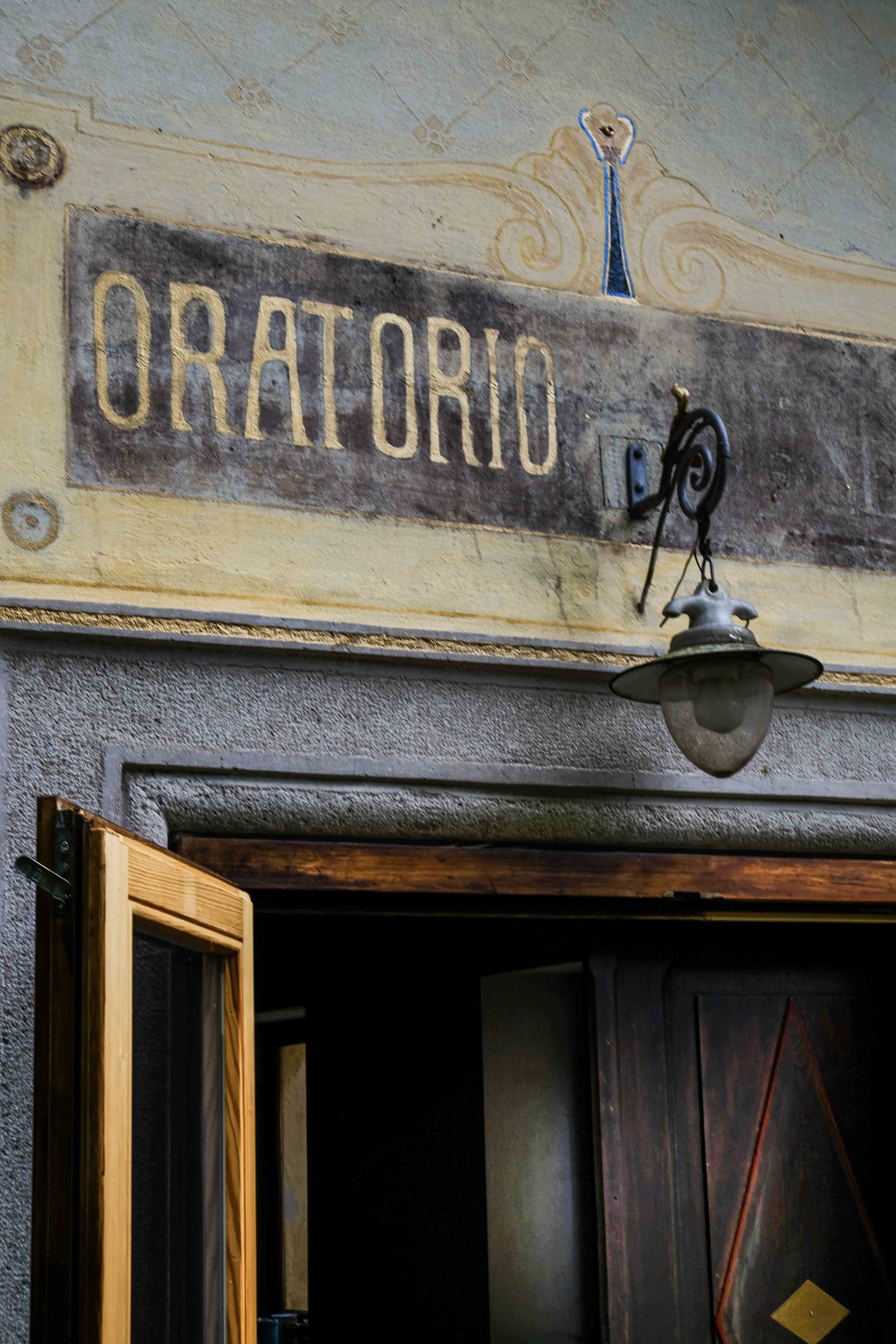
The factory chapel Oratorio San Giuseppe, named after the namesake saint of the longtime factory owner Giuseppe Pagani.

== Prehistory ==
The sparsely populated Blenio Valley, traditionally characterized in the past by subsistence-oriented forestry, arable farming and pasture farming, by viticulture in small plots and by emigration, developed forms of seasonal emigration in the 18th century in which better-off families also remained involved: the mostly male emigrants moving with the seasons to the urban centers of Europe (Paris, Milan, Pavia, Turin, Genoa, Lyon, Nice, Frankfurt, Amsterdam etc.), where they sold sweets, such as chestnuts or chocolate. In the summer, they usually returned to their villages to help with the agricultural work, which was left in the hands of the women the rest of the year. Domestic agriculture thus formed the backbone of this "dual family economy". The monetary income from emigration, which could be used only to a limited extent for consumption due to the lack of offers in the hardly commercialized economy of Ticino, flowed into new companies. This enabled the establishment of permanent sales outlets or cafes, restaurants and hotels and the accumulation of expertise and investment capital.

The best-known example of such a success story is the curriculum vitae of the entrepreneur Carlo Gatti (1817–1878) from Dongio in the Blenio Valley, whose restaurants and ice cream production brought him great wealth in England. The Cima family, who came from the commune of Aquila (today the commune of Blenio) and partly emigrated to the south of France, founded a chocolate factory in their valley of origin. Descendants of this long-established family, which had been wealthy since the 16th century, had already founded the first chocolate factory in Milan around 1750 and took over factories founded by their compatriots in Nice around 1800 and in Frankfurt around 1870. In addition, the manufacturer Maestrani in Flawil, Switzerland, goes back to a chocolatier from the municipality of Aquila. Also in distant Santiago de Chile, these emigrants founded the chocolate factory Giosia Luis, Hermano & Cia in 1875, which belongs to Nestlé Chile today.

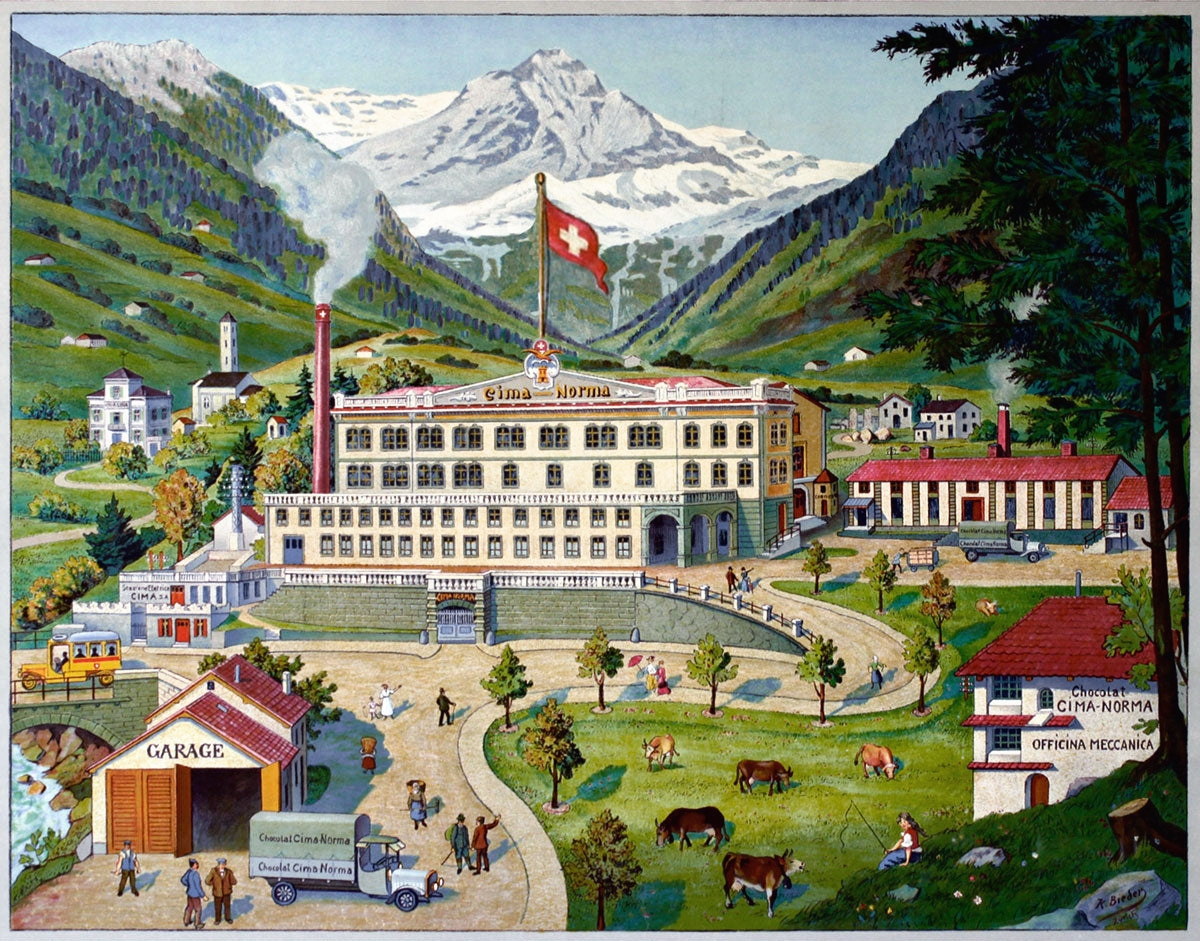
The factory in the early 20th century

== Founding of the company ==
The brothers who had returned from Nice, Rocco, Clemente, Ernesto and Bernardino Cima, founded the factory in Dangio-Torre in 1903. It consisted initially of nine employees under the name Cima Frères in the former San Salvatore brewery, which had been founded in 1879 and was in production until 1905. They sold the company on 19 May 1913 to Giuseppe Pagani (1859–1939), who had joined as an investor in 1908. Born in Torre, Giuseppe Pagani had worked as a waiter in London since 1873, but made his fortune in the hotel and restaurant business. In 1903 he sold his thriving Pagani's Restaurant with a private Artist Room at 54 Great Portland Street - whose guests included Pyotr Ilyich Tchaikovsky, Giacomo Puccini and Nellie Melba- and left London. In Switzerland, he invested in the chocolate factory Baumann and Cie., in liquidation in Adliswil near Zurich, with its Norma brand, whose inventory and customer base he acquired for 55,000 francs. In 1930 he managed both companies under the newly incorporated company Cima Norma S.A. Since his father had run his own chocolate production in Milan for a long time, Pagani was familiar with the business. This development initiated an economic boom in the Blenio Valley and temporarily led to a drastic increase in the resident population due to the influx of workers from the surrounding valleys and neighbouring Italy. In the period from 1913 to 1920, for example, the factory had 493 employees, 68.8% of whom travelled from outside the valley. The numerous female workers who were underemployed in local agriculture also played a decisive role in the choice of the unusual location, since, for lack of other opportunities, they were often willing to work for extremely low wages. The foreign workers were under the supervision of Roman Catholic nuns, first the Sisters of the Holy Cross Menzingen and later the Sisters of Providence of the Institute of Charity. In accordance with the expectations of the time, "immorality" was to be put to a stop. As his descendant Giò Waeckerlin Induni writes, the workers under her supervision were required to secure their dowry in their free time. Pagani is said to have given them "a small dowry" at the wedding.

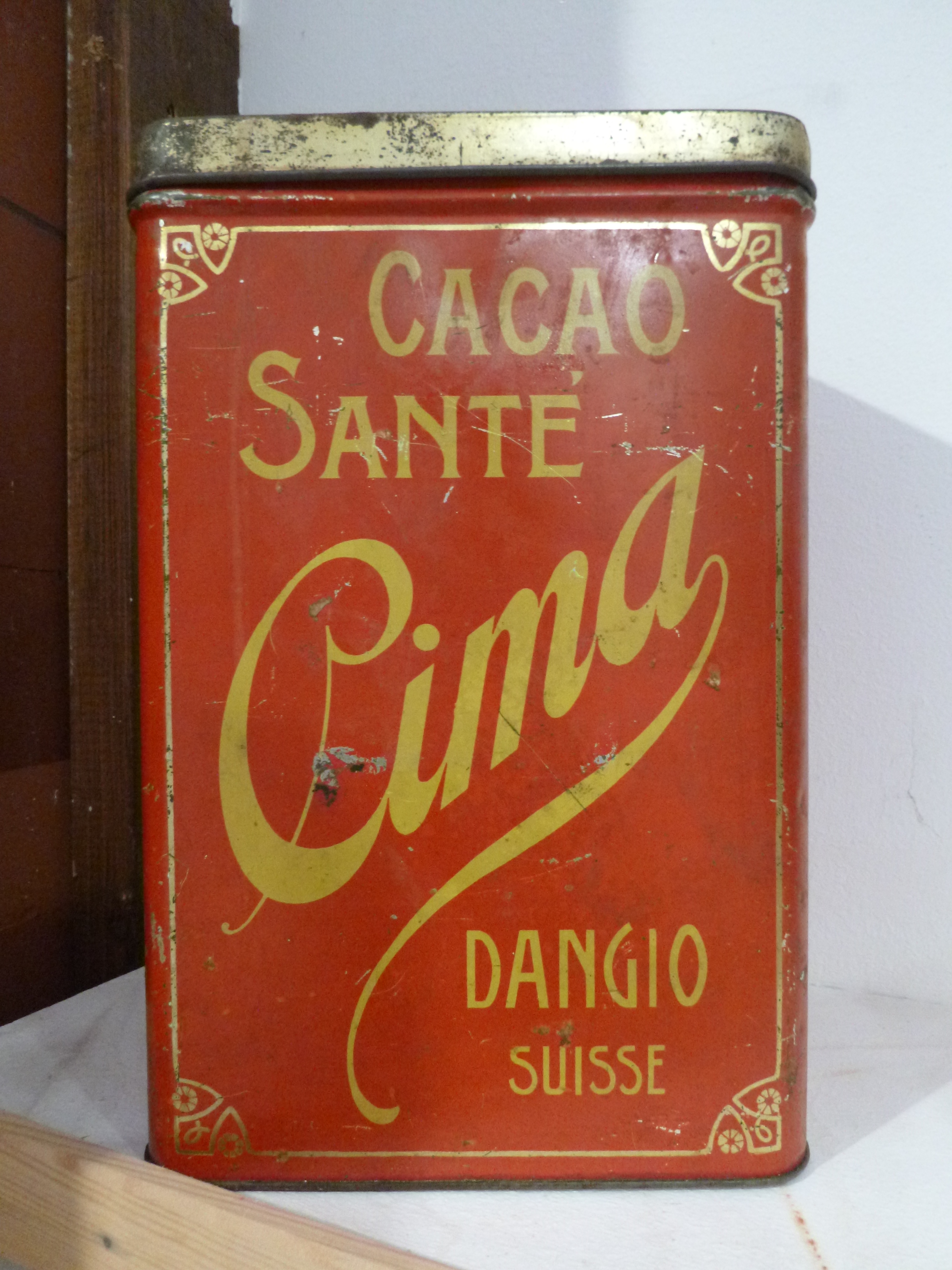
Chocolate powder tin

Another reason for the choice of location was that cocoa supply from British West Africa had proved more reliable than imports from Latin America during the two world wars and the interwar period. Deliveries of this kind often got stuck in the Atlantic ports during the wars. For this reason, the proportion of West African cocoa rose rapidly during the crisis years, reaching 84% in 1918 and 77% in 1944 of all cocoa imports into Switzerland. In order to be able to secure the coveted raw material at the source, several families from the neighbouring municipality of Ludiano (today the municipality of Serravalle) were even willing to emigrate to what was then the British colony of Sierra Leone in the 20th century. The location of the factory on the transport route via the seaports in Italy therefore proved to be a competitive advantage for the company. Due to its rapid growth, Cima Norma S.A. thus also become the most important beneficiary and major shareholder of the railway connection to the Blenio Valley (Biasca–Acquarossa railway). The sacks of cocoa, most of which arrived from Genoa, were transported by this private railway company from the time they were loaded in Biasca. Saurer trucks covered the rest of the way. Giuseppe Pagani was a co-founder of this railway and served as its chairman from 1906 until his death. The management of Cima Norma S.A. was later taken over from Francesco Antognini and Luigi Ferrazzini.

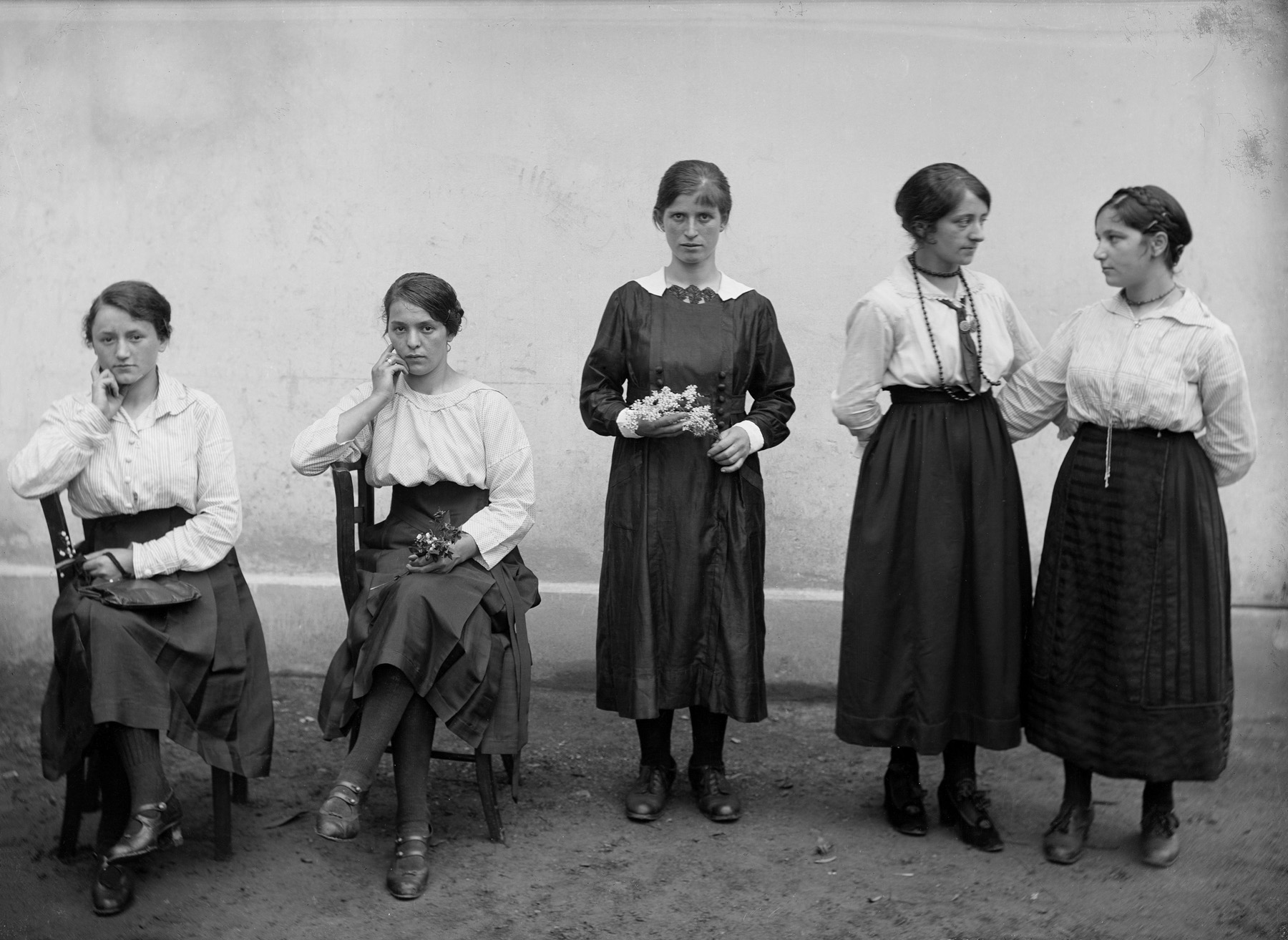
Female workers of Cima-Norma (early 20th century)

== Rise and closure of the company ==
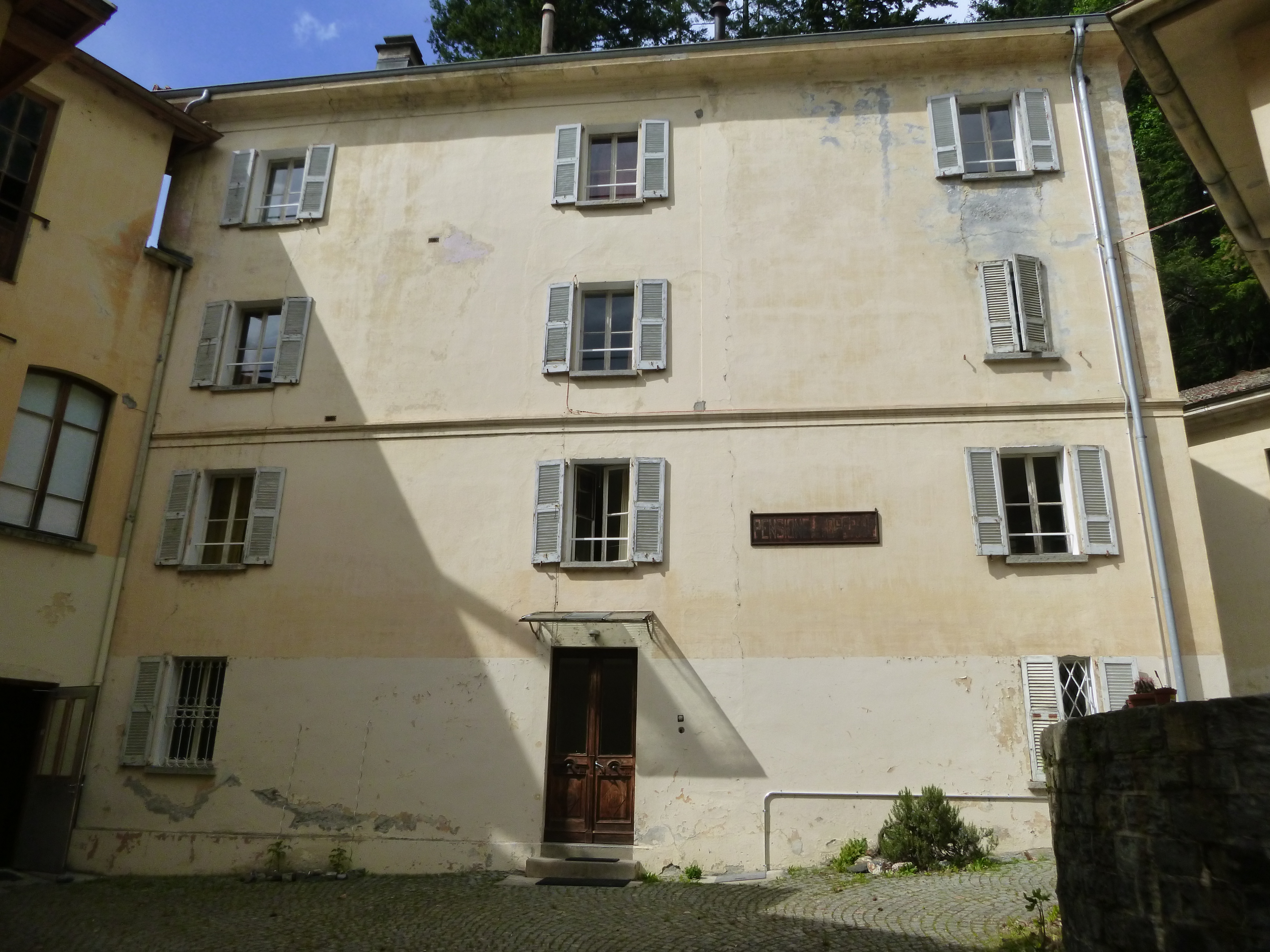
Female workers' pension of Cima-Norma S.A. (Pensione per Operaie)

CimaNorma S.A. could be sure of its success for a long time: In particular, the government protective measures and subsidies during the isolation years of the Second World War, which brought the company hefty profits, had led to this assessment. In 1939 production peaked at around 1.500 tons. CimaNorma S.A. supplied a large part of the Swiss army chocolate as part of the so-called war economy and was personally visited by General Henri Guisan in September 1941. The increasing consumer demand that began after the war, which had easily absorbed the production of the manufacturers previously active in the market, as well as fixed purchase agreements with the major cooperative distributors Coop (then Schweizerischer Konsumvereine Basel) and Usego reinforced an overly optimistic assessment of the situation. As a result, those responsible were hardly interested in innovation and changing customer requirements and lost touch with the numerous competitors. At the same time, personnel, raw material and logistics costs had risen steadily.

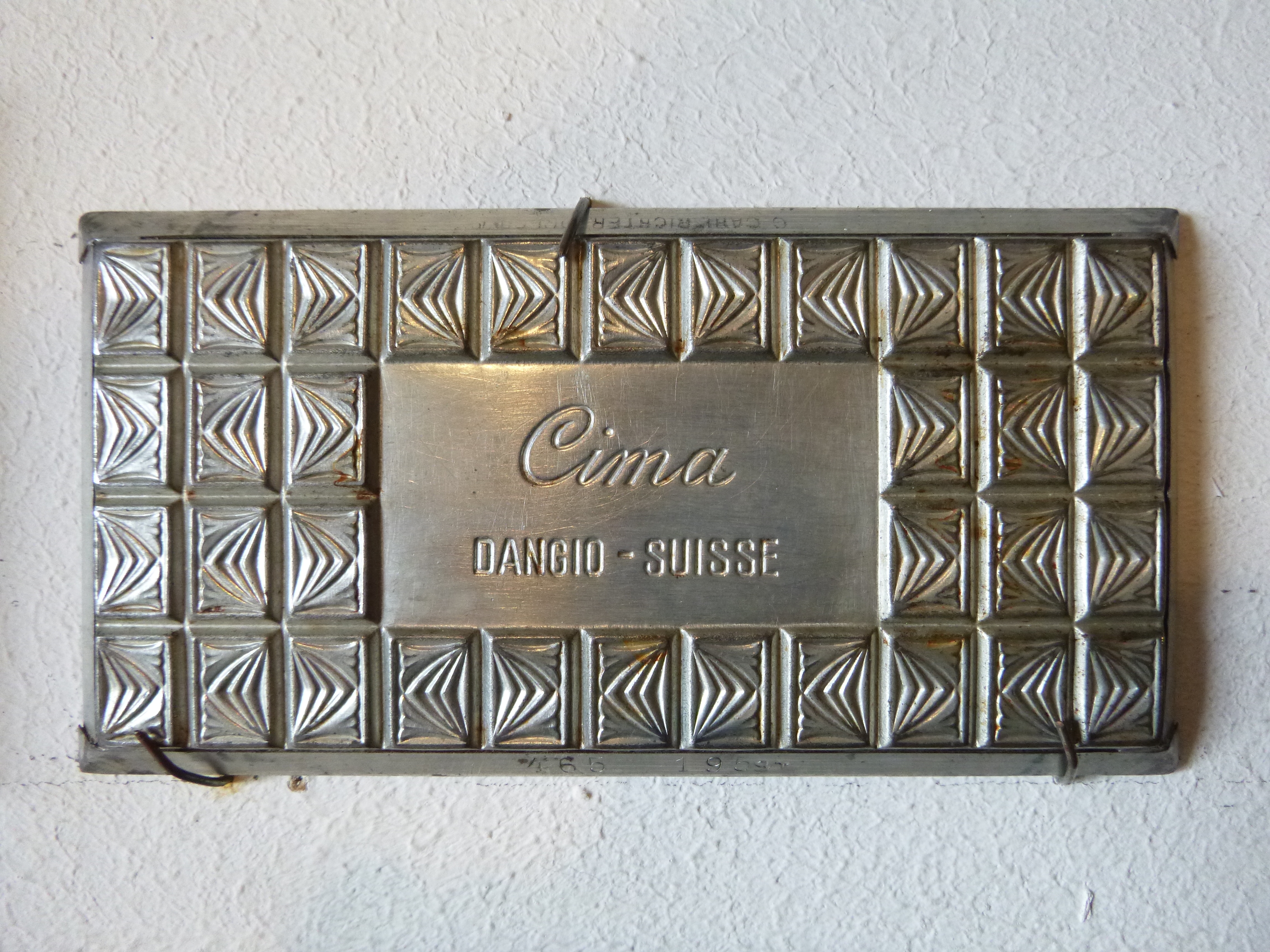
Chocolate mold

When Coop quit the agreement with CimaNorma S.A. in August 1966, the company lost almost two-thirds of its sales immediately. Other major buyers such as Volg, Végé Italiana and the sale of the cheaper private label Tessinor in West Germany were unable to make up for the loss quickly enough. Latter attempts to diversify the sales markets with new ideas, new management personnel, and the redundancies that were immediately carried out could not save the company from imminent closure. This was evident in spring of 1968 as the company closed at the end of July that same year. The dismissals of employees did not meet with any significant resistance from the population, because the majority of those affected were housewives working part-time and hardly any unionised guest workers. The demise of CimaNorma S.A. and the almost simultaneous cessation of spa operations in neighbouring Acquarossa sealed the end of the rail connection to the valley: it was dismantled and replaced by a bus service. As a result, the population of the Blenio Valley continued to decline.

== Aftermath ==
The factory and its workers repeatedly attracted the artistic interest of the art-historically renowned photographer Roberto Donetta (1865-1932), who came from the Blenio Valley and dealt with these people in several impressive series of portraits. In addition to their aesthetic value, the recordings also provide information about the social structure of the factory workforce.

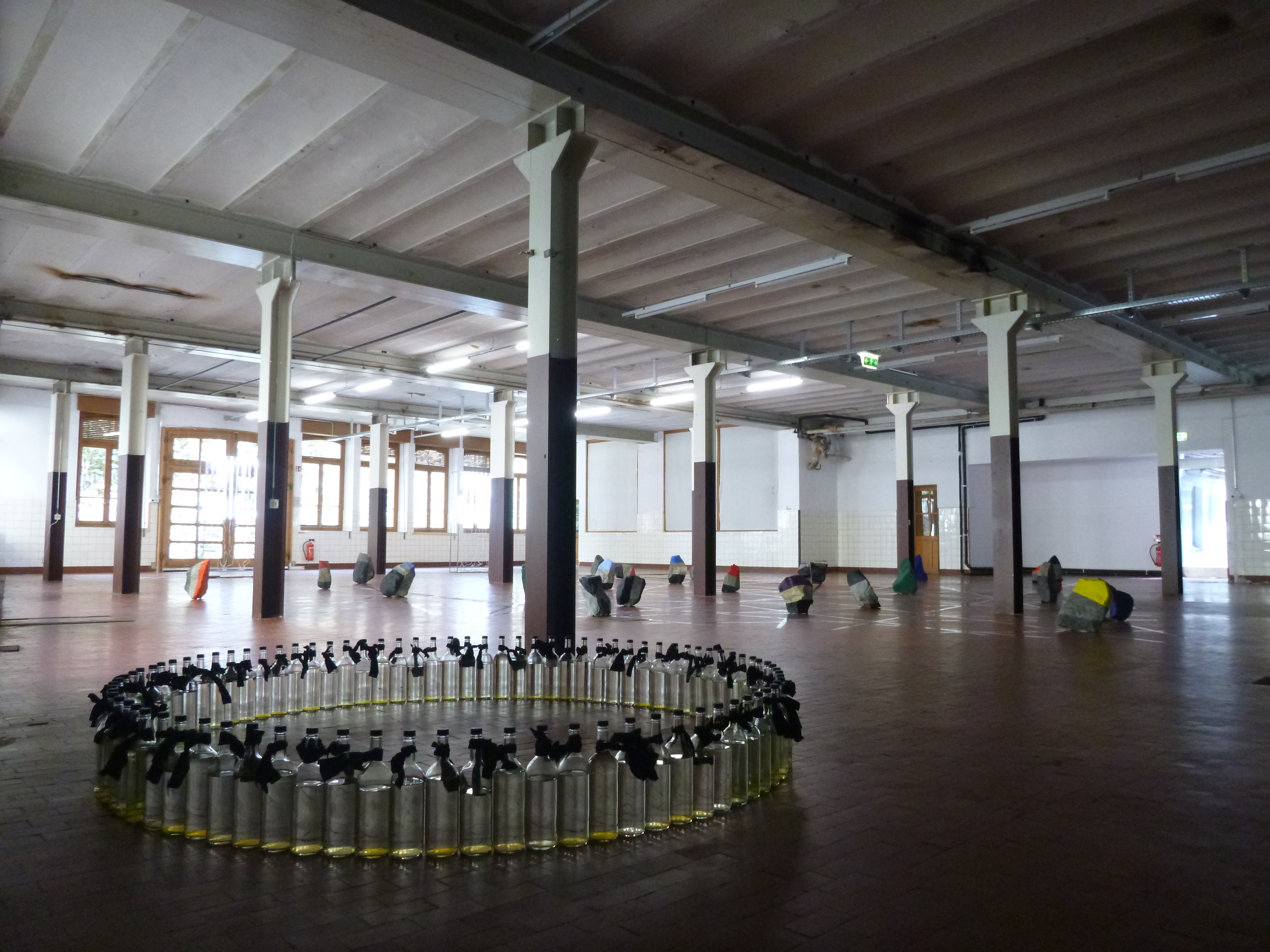
Installation art in a former production room in May 2019

The return of many wealthy emigrants from Europe and overseas led to the construction of stately villas, mainly in Olivone and in the southern municipalities of the Blenio Valley (Semione, Ludiano and Malvaglia, today the municipality of Serravalle). In particular, they give the village of Semione, which is nestled in the rural-Alpine environment, a sophisticated urban appearance. The village was therefore included in the Inventory of Swiss Heritage Sites. The widespread use of French and English among the valley's older population was also a legacy of this period. Most of the descendants of the former farmers and small traders who became burgher through trade and industry have left the valley. Pagani's daughters in turn married, as author and niece Giò Waeckerlin Induni writes, "with one exception - wealthy men from old Ticino families: doctors, lawyers, politicians."

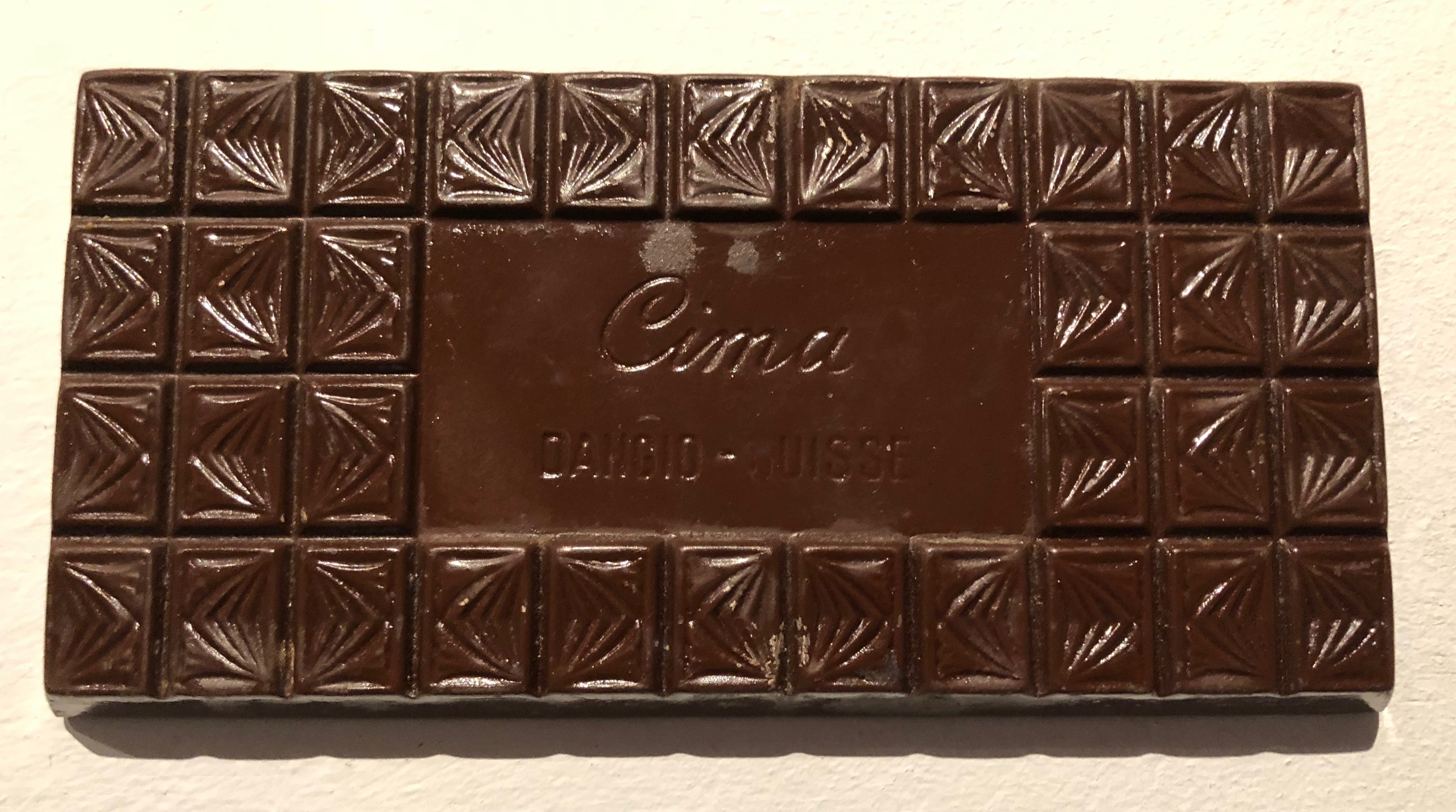
Chocolate bar

The imposing third production building of Fabbrica di Cioccolato CimaNorma S.A., built with a claim to representation and aesthetics, was built after severe elemental damage to the two previous buildings occurred and has its own workers' apartments ("Pensione per Operaie"). It had a factory chapel and its own power plant fed by water power of the river Soia, and to this day dominates the townscape of the mountain village of Dangio-Torre, which has hardly grown since then. The building is a design by engineer Alfonso Zoppi (1879–1942) from 1917. At the same time, Zoppi was involved in the construction of the Biasca–Acquarossa railway, which he managed from 1910 to 1917. In the Torre cemetery, the mausoleum of Giuseppe Pagani can be visited, which has marble reliefs on the outside and an elaborate ceiling mosaic on the inside. It was built in 1930 according to plans by the architect Enea Tallone (1876-1937). Another architectural heritage is the Villa Pagani (also: Villa Lina) by the architect Giuseppe Martinoli from 1897, with a riding stable from 1904. The sons-in-law who were entrusted with the management after the death of Giuseppe Pagani also had their own villas built (Villa Antognini, Villa Ferrazzini). Numerous production rooms are now open to the public. A permanent exhibition shows the history of the Cima Norma.

The further use of the production and residential buildings was unclear for a long time. Parts of the site, which comprises around two dozen individual buildings, have so far been used by small local businesses and occasionally as accommodation for the Swiss army. In 1992, architects and students from the Southern California Institute of Architecture branch in Vico Morcote undertook a comprehensive study of the possibility of converting the factory into a cultural center with living, recreation and work spaces, including a restaurant. However, the project presented by the architects Martin Wagner and Lars Lerup could not be implemented due to a lack of funds. On 13 March 2009 the Ticino architect Marino Venturini, who was concerned about preserving the buildings, acquired the disused industrial site and 87% of the share capital from the Antognini family, descendants of Giuseppe Pagani.

The successor to CimaNorma S.A., which was entered in the Commercial Register of the Canton of Ticino in January 1972 mainly as a real estate company, received new statutes for the first time in 1997. Finally, in 2017, a brand of the same name was relaunched as a nostalgic reminiscence of the Belle Époque together with Chocolat Stella Bernrain as a “private label”.

== La Fabbrica del Cioccolato Foundation ==
The Fondazione La Fabbrica del Cioccolato was established in November 2015 with the entry in the commercial register. It has set itself broad goals in the fields of culture and education, for which it mainly wants to seek cooperation with domestic and foreign cultural and educational institutions. Due to outstanding wage payments and unpaid orders to artists and craftsmen, the foundation was most recently in averted bankruptcy proceedings. Although La Fabbrica del Cioccolato was financially overstretched in its early stages, it seems to have stabilized thereafter, enjoying the support of the Banca dello Stato del Cantone Ticino and the ERSBV, an organization promoting economic development in the Tre Valli. It offers space and seclusion for creators of contemporary art. At the end of August 2020 the first Cima Norma Art Festival took place.

== See also ==
- Swiss chocolate
