= Martino Traversa =

Martino Traversa may refer to:

- Martino Traversa (composer) (born 1960), Italian composer of classical and electronic music
- Martino Traversa (footballer) (born 1974), Italian football defender

== See also ==
- Martino (given name)
- Traversa
