= Marolta =

Village and former municipality in Switzerland

Coordinates: 46°28′42″N 8°55′11″E

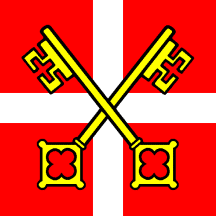
Flag

Marolta is a village and former municipality in the canton of Ticino, Switzerland.

It was first recorded in year 1205 as Malouta.

The municipality also contained a part of the village Traversa. It had 178 inhabitants in 1808, but this decreased to 136 in 1850, 86 in 1900, 75 in 1950 and 43 in 2000.

In 2004 the municipality was merged with the other, neighboring municipalities Castro, Corzoneso, Dongio, Largario, Leontica, Lottigna, Ponto Valentino and Prugiasco to form a new and larger municipality Acquarossa, the name taken from the old village in Lottigna.
