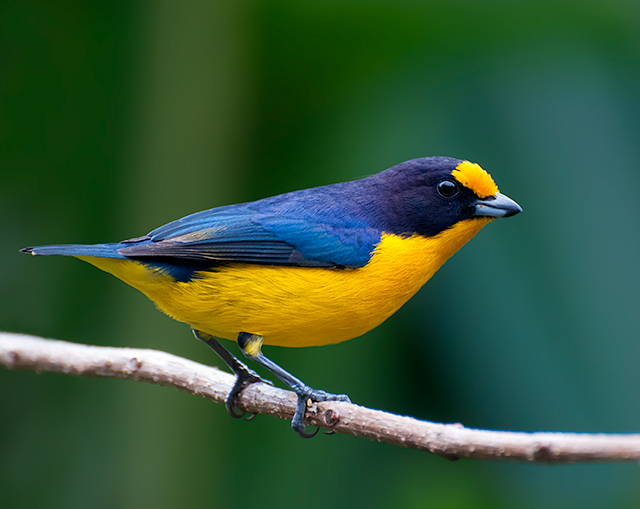
- Male
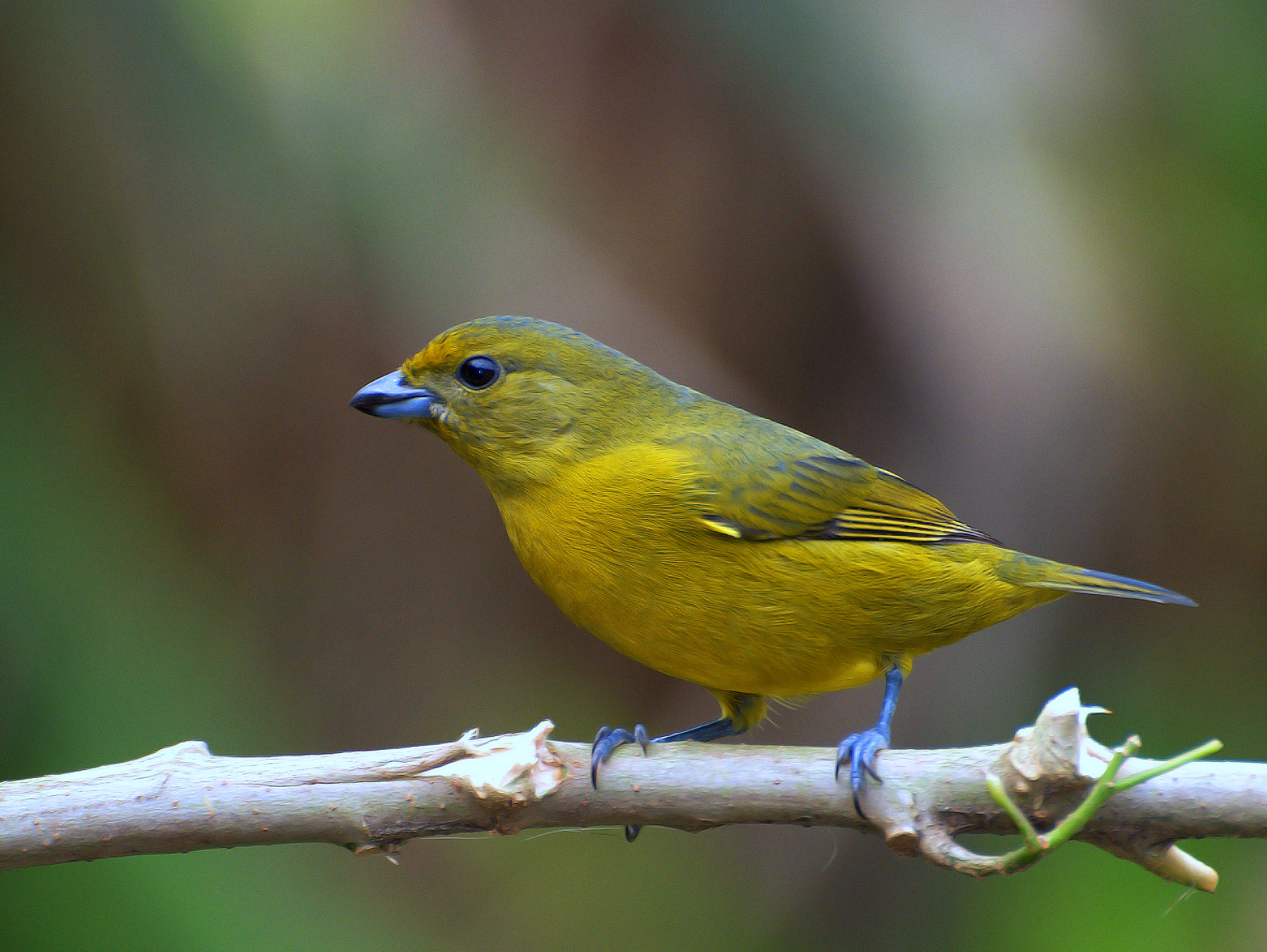
- Female

Conservation status
- Least Concern (IUCN 3.1)

Scientific classification
- Kingdom: Animalia
- Phylum: Chordata
- Class: Aves
- Order: Passeriformes
- Family: Fringillidae
- Subfamily: Euphoniinae
- Genus: Euphonia
- Species: E. violacea

Binomial name
- Euphonia violacea (Linnaeus, 1758)

Synonyms
- Fringilla violacea Linnaeus, 1758; Tanagra violacea Linnaeus, 1766

= Violaceous euphonia =

Species of bird

The violaceous euphonia (Euphonia violacea) is a small passerine bird in the true finch family Fringillidae. It is widely distributed in eastern South America.

== Taxonomy ==
The violaceous euphonia was formally described in 1758 by the Swedish naturalist Carl Linnaeus in the tenth edition of his Systema Naturae based on a specimen in the collection of Adolf Frederick of Sweden. He placed it with the finches in the genus Fringilla and coined the binomial name Fringilla violacea. The specific epithet is from Latin violaceus meaning "violet-coloured". Linnaeus specified the type locality as Calidis regionibus ("hot countries") but in 1902 Hans von Berlepsch and Ernst Hartert designated the locality as Suriname. The violaceous euphonia is now one of 25 Neotropical species placed in the genus Euphonia that was introduced in 1806 by the French zoologist Anselme Gaëtan Desmarest.

Three subspecies are recognised:

- E. v. rodwayi (Penard, TE, 1919) – Venezuela and Trinidad
- E. v. violacea (Linnaeus, 1758) – the Guianas and north Brazil
- E. v. aurantiicollis Bertoni, AW, 1901 – east Brazil to north Paraguay and northeast Argentina

== Description ==
Adult violaceous euphonias are 11.4 cm long and weigh 14 g. The male has glossy blue-black upperparts and a deep golden yellow forehead and underparts. The female and immature are olive green above and greenish yellow below.

== Distribution and habitat ==
It is a resident breeder from Trinidad, Tobago and eastern Venezuela south to Paraguay and northeastern Argentina. The bird's range in northern Brazil is the lower portion of the Amazon Basin and the adjacent Tocantins River drainage, with its northwestern limits from Brazil and the Guyanas, the eastern banks of the Orinoco River drainage in central Venezuela.

It occurs in forests, second growth and plantations of cocoa and citrus fruit. The ball nest is built on a bank, tree stump or cavity and the normal clutch is four, sometimes three, red-blotched white eggs, which are incubated by the female.

== Behaviour ==
These are social birds which eat mainly small fruit and only rarely take insects. The fruits are mostly mistletoes, epiphytic cacti and Cecropia fruit which are suited for them because of their simple digestive tract. Along with insects, it has been seen to consume terrestrial snails in Brazil. The violaceous euphonia's song is a varied mix of musical notes, squeaks, chattering and imitation.

Members of the genus Euphonia are prized as cage birds and several are threatened by trapping, but this species benefits from its relatively inaccessible habitat.

== Bibliography ==
- ffrench, Richard (1991). A Guide to the Birds of Trinidad and Tobago (2nd ed.). Comstock Publishing. ISBN 0-8014-9792-2.
- Hilty, Steven L (2003). Birds of Venezuela. London: Christopher Helm. ISBN 0-7136-6418-5.
