= Leontica =

Swiss village

Coordinates: 46°27′33″N 8°55′21″E

Leontica is a village and former municipality in the canton of Ticino, Switzerland.

Aerial view (1954)

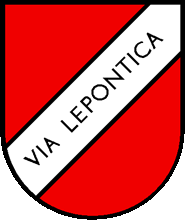
Coat of arms

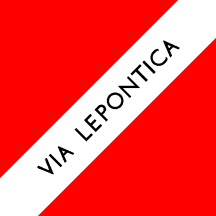
Flag

It was first recorded in year 1204 as Levontega.

The municipality also contained the village Comprovasco. It had 315 inhabitants in 1602, which increased to 441 in 1808 and 473 in 1850. It then declined a bit, to 295 in 1900 and 408 in 1950. In 2000 the population had dropped to 267.

In 2004 the municipality was merged with the other, neighboring municipalities Castro, Corzoneso, Dongio, Largario, Lottigna, Marolta, Ponto Valentino and Prugiasco to form a new and larger municipality Acquarossa.

In winter Leontica includes 30 km of ski pistes up to the Bassa di Nara pass (2,123 m).
