= Castro, Ticino =

Village in Switzerland

- Village
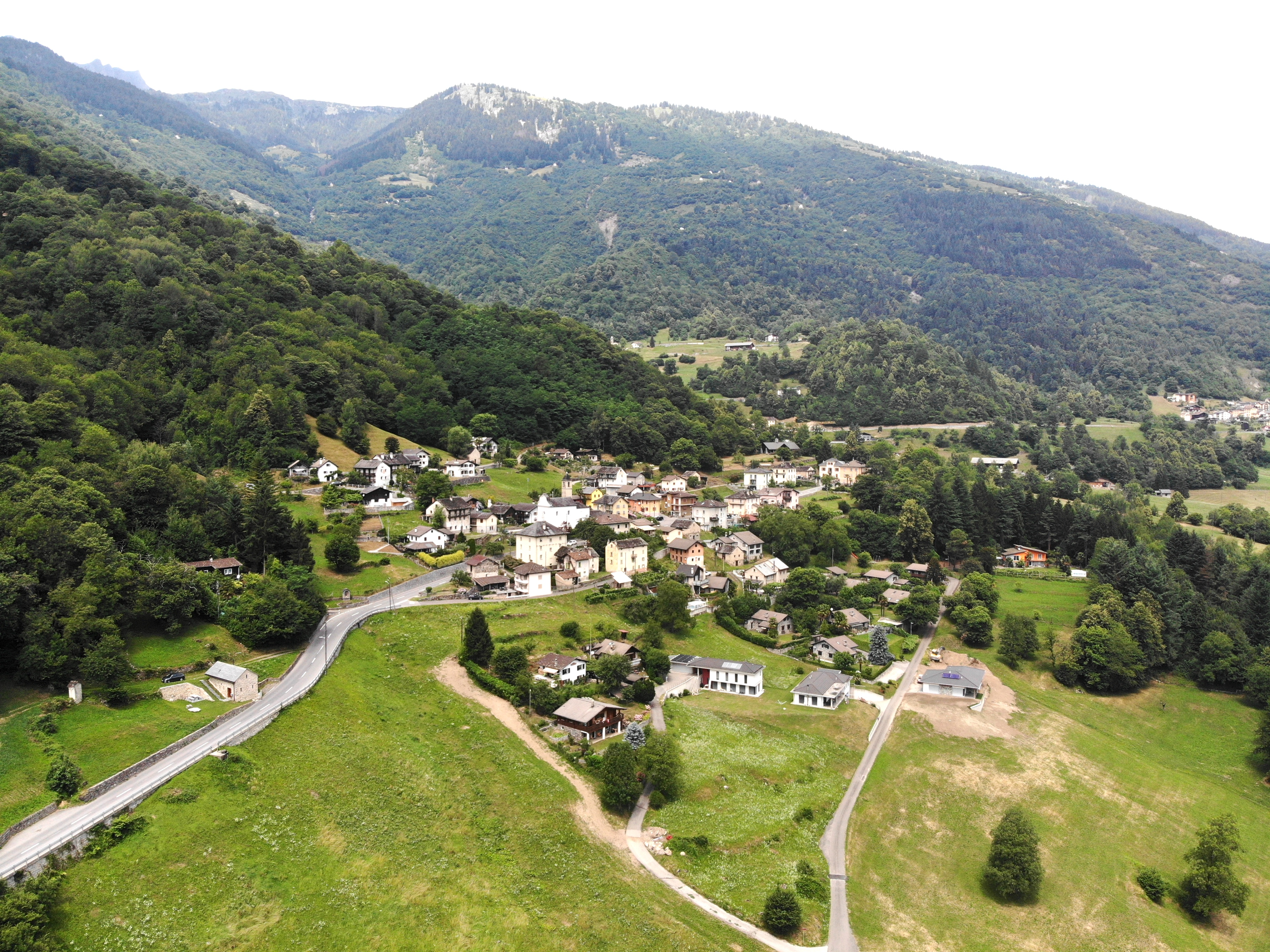

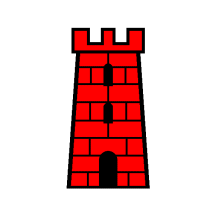
- Flag

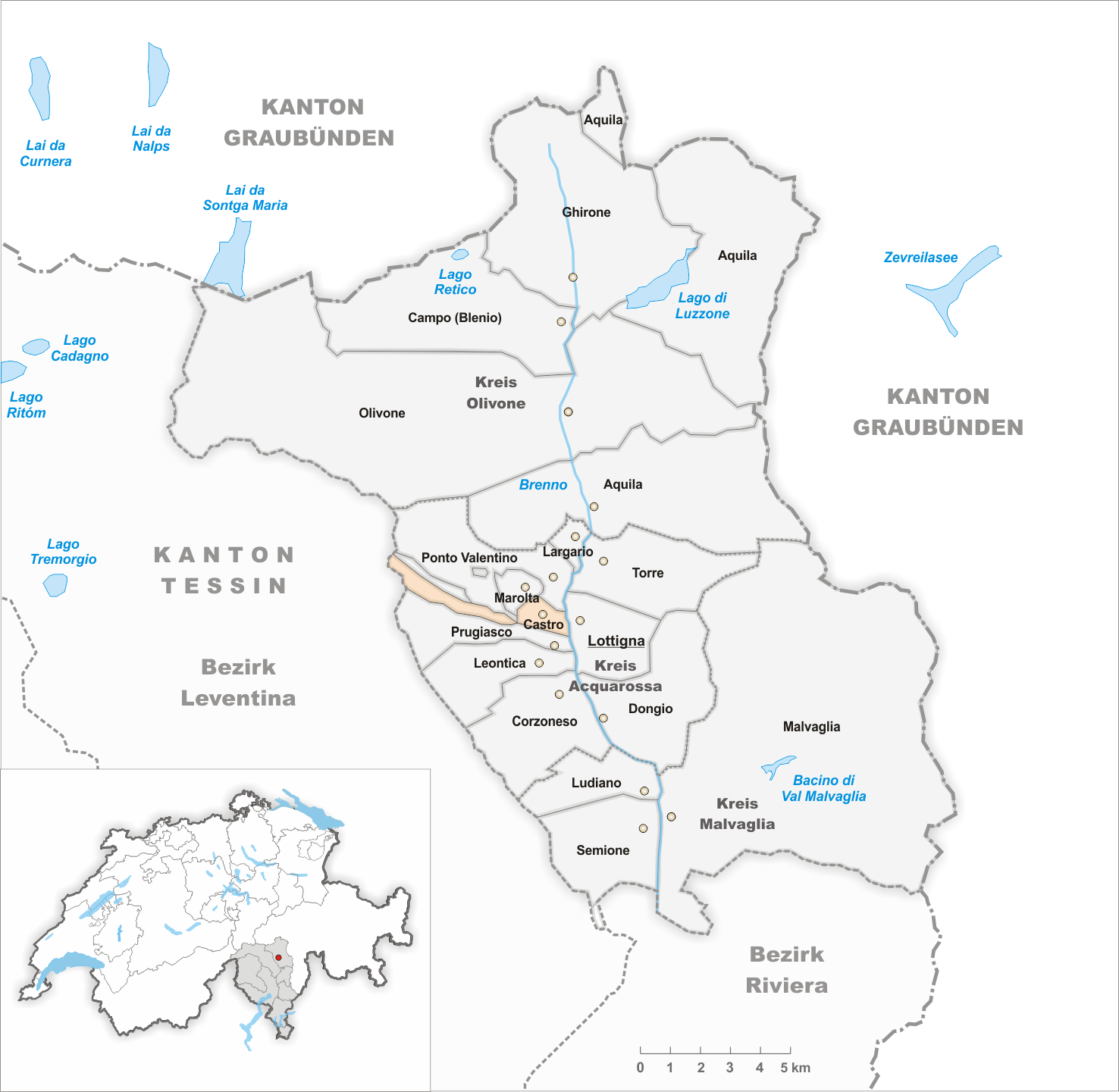
- Coordinates: 46°29′N 8°56′E
- Country: Switzerland
- Canton: Ticino

Population (2000)
  - Total: 81

Castro is a village and former municipality in the canton of Ticino, Switzerland.

It was first recorded in year 1200 as Castri.

It had 68 inhabitants in 1567, which increased to 114 in 1808 and 129 in 1850. It then decreased to 97 in 1900, 81 in 1950 and 62 in 1970. In 2000 the population count was back on 81.

In 2004 the municipality was merged with the other, neighboring municipalities Corzoneso, Dongio, Largario, Leontica, Lottigna, Marolta, Ponto Valentino and Prugiasco to form a new and larger municipality Acquarossa.
