= Moisés Santiago Bertoni =

Swiss naturalist

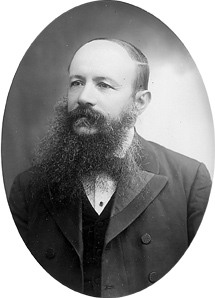
- Born: Mosè Giacomo Bertoni; 15 June 1857; Lottigna, Ticino, Switzerland
- Died: September 19, 1929 (aged 72); Foz do Iguaçu, Paraná, Brazil
- Known for: Writer, botanist
- Notable work: Nuovo Compendio di Geografía; La voce del Ticino
- Relatives: Arnoldo de Winkelried Bertoni (son); Luigi Bertoni (cousin)

Mosè Giacomo Bertoni (15 June 1857 – 19 September 1929), better known by his hispanicized name Moisés Santiago Bertoni, was a Swiss-Paraguayan naturalist, botanist and writer. While conducting research in eastern Paraguay in 1899, he was the first to describe Stevia.

== Biography ==
Bertoni was born on 15 June 1857 in Lottigna, in the Swiss canton of Ticino, the son of Ambrogio Bertoni, a member of the Grand Council of Ticino, and Giuseppina Torriani. His father was an Italian patriot from Milan who participated in the Five Days of Milan and the First Italian War of Independence. Bertoni studied law in Zurich and natural sciences in Geneva. In March 1884, just shy of graduating in botany, he emigrated to Argentina, along with his family and some farmers from Blenio, to found an agricultural and scientific colony that would put anarcho-socialist ideals into practice; Bertoni gave up the project after being abandoned by his companions.

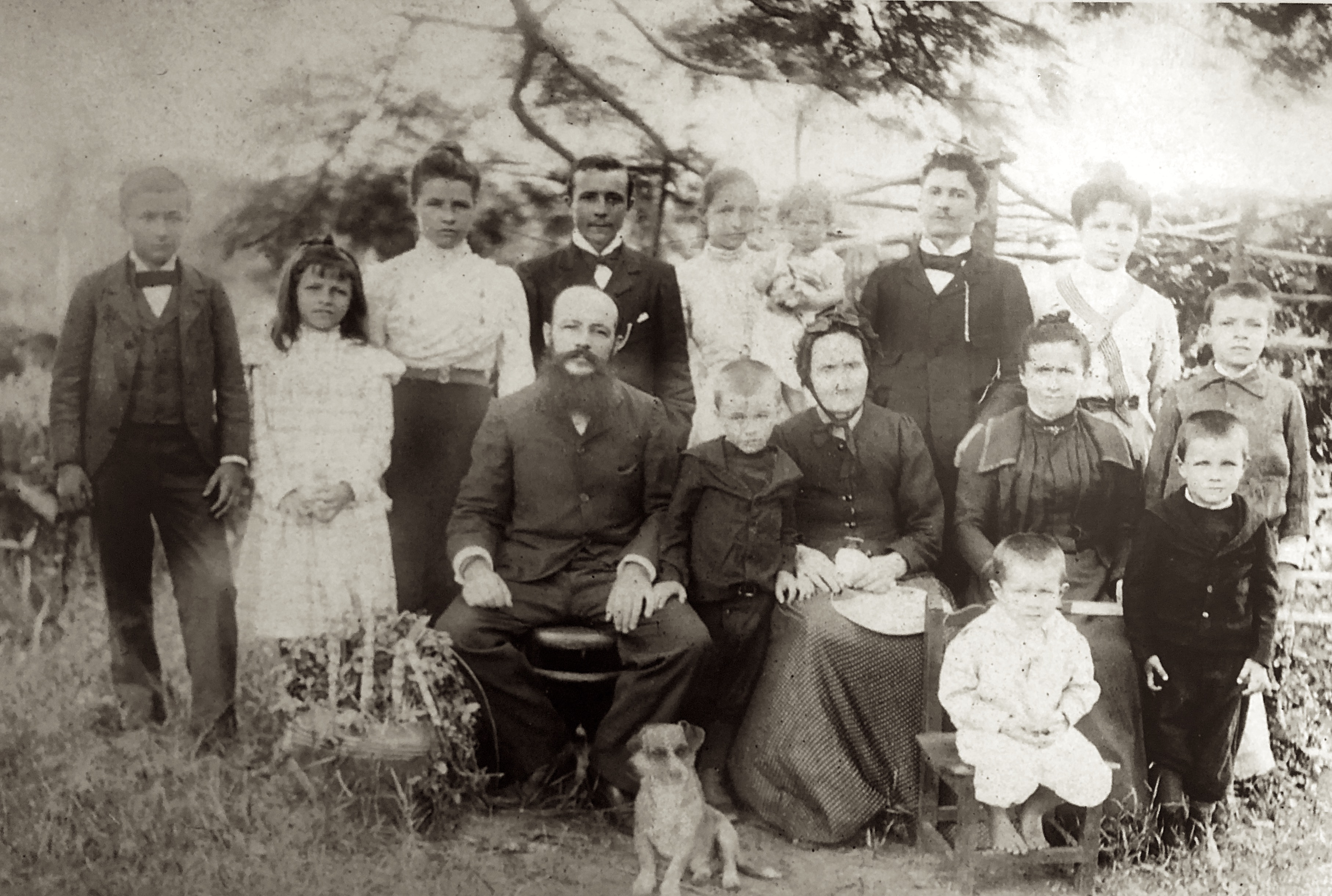
Bertoni with his wife and children, 1902

In 1887, Bertoni moved to Paraguay and, in 1893, settled near the Iguazu Falls, establishing the Guillermo Tell colony (named after Swiss folk hero William Tell) on the banks of the Paraná River, in a place still known today as Puerto Bertoni. He founded the National School of Agriculture in Asunción in 1894, which he directed until 1904, when he returned permanently to Puerto Bertoni. In the midst of the jungles of Alto Paraná, Bertoni studied botany, meteorology, agronomy, geography, zoology, and ethnography, tirelessly dedicating himself to research and science communication. This work eventually became more significant than his role as a colonist. Puerto Bertoni, supported by the work of Bertoni's large family, became an agronomic and scientific outpost with extensive foreign relations.

In 1918, Bertoni established the printing house Ex Sylvis (Latin for "from the jungle") in Puerto Bertoni, which went on to publish some of his most important works. Beginning in 1915, the region was hit by a long economic crisis that affected the colony: resources necessary to support research and publications became scarce, and Bertoni's thirteen children gradually dispersed. Bertoni died in poverty on 19 September 1929 in Foz do Iguaçu, across the Brazilian border, aged 72.

== Legacy ==
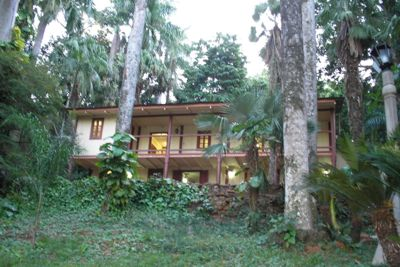
Moisés Bertoni's house in Puerto Bertoni, Presidente Franco District, now the Scientific Monument Moisés Bertoni

On his death, Bertoni left behind an enormous number of unpublished manuscripts. His bibliography includes more than 500 publications, but his most ambitious work, the encyclopedic Descripción física, económica y social del Paraguay, planned for 18 volumes, remained unfinished. Bertoni's enduring fame in Paraguay, where he was nicknamed el Sabio ("the Sage"), derives from his works on climatology, anthropology (notably a work on the Guaraní people), and popular scientific writings on agronomy, as well as to his public image as a benevolent sage living in the woods.

Bertoni's botanical collections are conserved at the Sociedad Científica del Paraguay, and were afterwards restored by the Geneva Botanical Garden.

== Works ==
- 1878: Nuovo compendio di geografia—Bellinzona : Colombi
- 1882: Revista Científica Svizzera
- 1886: Moises Bertoni, La Voce del Ticino
- 1901: Almanaque agrícola paraguayo (Paraguayan agricultural Almanac) -- Puerto Bertoni: Printing and Publishing Former Sylvis, - 250 p.
- 1903: Agenda agrícola del Paraguay (Paraguay's agricultural agenda) -- Puerto Bertoni: Printing and publishing Former Sylvis, - 360 p.
- 1903: Agenda y mentor agrícola (Agenda agrícola paraguayo y Almanaque agrícola paraguayo)
- 1903: Agenda y almanaque agrícola paraguayo: conteniendo la indicación de los trabajos agrícolas de cada mes (Calendar and Almanac Paraguayan agriculture) -- Asunción: Tall. National H. Kraus - 360 p.
- 1904: Meios praticos para combater o gorgulho do milho (Agenda and agricultural almanac Paraguay: containing an indication of agricultural work each month) - 2nd ed. -- Assumption: H. Kraus - 360 p.
- 1905: Plantas usuales del Paraguay: Alto Paraná y Misiones; nomenclatura, caracteres, propiedades a aplicaciones según los estudios del autor, o datos de personas fidedignas o el uso que de ellas hacen los indios, incluyendo un estudio físico e industrial de las maderas (Plant usual Paraguay: Alto Parana and Misiones; nomenclature, characters, properties applications according to research by the author, or data from credible persons or make use of them Indians, including a study of physical and industrial timber)
- 1905: La enseñanza agrícola (The agricultural education) -- Asunción: Tall. National H. Kraus - 100 p.
- 1907: Resumen de geografía botánica del Paraguay (Summary of botany geography of Paraguay) -- Asunción: s.n.
- 1909: La cubierta verde y la supresión de la escarda en las plantaciones (The green cover and the removal of the weed in plantations) --: S.n. - 18 p.
- 1910: Plantae Bertonianae: les onothéracées du Paraguay—Asunción: Tall. National H. Kraus - 22 p.
- 1910: Descripción física y económica del Paraguay: Plantae Bertonianae (Description of Physical and economic Paraguay: Plantae Bertonianae) -- S. L.: s.n., 20 p.
- 1911: Contribución preliminar al estudio sistemático, biológico y económico de las plantas paraguayas (Contribution to preliminary systematic study, biological and economic Paraguayan plants) 2nd ed. -- S.L.: s.n..,
- 1911: Nuevo método para el cultivo del banano: práctica del rozado sin quemar(New method for growing banana: practice of "grazed unburned) -- Puerto Bertoni: Printing and Publishing Former Sylvis, - 14 p.
- 1912: Contribución al estudio de la gomosis del naranjo y su tratamiento (Contribution to the study of gomosis of orange and its treatment) -- Assumption: The Printing beehive - 1 pl, 13 - 4 p.
- 1913: Fauna paraguaya (Animals Paraguayan) -- S.L.: S. N.
- 1913: Descripción física y económica del Paraguay (Physical description and cost of Paraguay) -- Asunción: Brossa
- 1914: Ortografía guaraní sobre la base de la ortografía internacional adoptada por los congresos de zoología y botánica, con arreglo a la ortografía lingüística adoptada por el congreso científico internacional de Buenos Aires (1910) y a la generalmente seguida por los lingüistas estadounidenses (Extended Edition part of the monograph "Introduction usual plants, nomenclature, and dictionary of Latin genres Guarani of the play economic and physical description of Paraguay)
- 1914: Summary of prehistory and protohistoria of countries Guarani: lectures given at the National College of the second lesson of the Asuncion on July 26, 8 and August 21, 1913. -- Asunción: J.E. O'Leary. -- 1 PL., XLV, 162 p.
- 1914: Ortografía guaraní sobre la base de la ortografía internacional adoptada por los congresos de zoología y botánica, con arreglo a la ortografía lingüística adoptada por el congreso científico internacional de Buenos Aires (1910) y a la generalmente seguida por los lingüistas estadounidenses (Spelling Guarani based on the international spelling adopted by the congresses of zoology and botany, according to the spelling language adopted by the international scientific congress in Buenos Aires (1910) and usually followed by linguists Americans) -- Asunción: M. Brossa, 1914. - 22 p.
- 1914: Extended Edition part of the monograph Plantas usuales: introducción, nomenclatura, y diccionario de los géneros latino-guaraní de la obra Descripción física y económica del Paraguay (Introduction usual plants, nomenclature, and dictionary of Latin genres Guarani of the play economic and physical description of Paraguay)
- 1914: Resumen de prehistoria y protohistoria de los países guaraníes (Summary of prehistory and protohistoria of countries Guarani: lectures given at the National College of the second lesson of the Assumption on July 26, 8 and August 21, 1913). -- Assumption: J.E. O'Leary. -- 1 PL., XLV, 162 p.
- 1914: Las plantas usuales del Paraguay y países limítrofes: caracteres, propiedades y aplicaciones con la nomenclatura guaraní, portuguesa, española, latina y la etimología guaraní incluyendo un estudio físico e industrial de las maderas (The usual plants in Paraguay and neighboring countries: characters, properties and applications with the nomenclature Guarani, Portuguese, Spanish, Latin and etymology Guarani including a study of physical and industrial timber). -- Asunción: M: Brossa. - 78 p.
- 1914: Descripción física y económica del Paraguay, numeración novenal 31; introducción, nomenclatura y diccionario de los géneros botánicos latino-guaraní (Physical description of Paraguay and economic" novenal numbering 31; Introduction, nomenclature and botanical dictionary of Latin genres Guarani)

== See also ==
- Anarchism in Paraguay
- Arnoldo de Winkelried Bertoni
- Doctor Moisés Bertoni, a village in the Caazapá department of Paraguay named in honour of Moisés Santiago Bertoni
- Moises Bertoni Foundation
