= Traversa =

Traversa is an Italian surname. Notable people with the surname include:

- Alejandro Traversa (born 1974), Uruguayan footballer
- Fabio Traversa (born 1952), Italian actor
- Lucia Traversa (born 1965), Italian fencer
- Martino Traversa (born 1960), Italian composer
- Martino Traversa (born 1974), Italian footballer
- Michele Traversa (1948–2025), Italian politician
- Tito Traversa (2001–2013), Italian mountain climber
- Tommaso Traversa (born 1990), Italian ice hockey player

== See also ==
- 5651 Traversa, main-belt asteroid
