= Arnoldo de Winkelried Bertoni =

Swiss-Paraguayan zoologist

- Born: December 28, 1878; Lottigna, Blenio District, Switzerland
- Died: August 1973 (aged 94); Asunción, Paraguay
- Other names: Arnaldo de Winkelried
- Occupation: zoologist

Arnoldo de Winkelried Bertoni (December 28, 1878 – August 1973), also known as Arnaldo da Winkelried, was a Paraguayan zoologist born in Switzerland.

== Biography ==
He was better known as Arnaldo de Winkelried, his name given in honor of the Swiss soldier Arnold von Winkelried who died at the Battle of Sempach in 1386. In 1887, he emigrated to Paraguay along with his family. He first began studying zoology with his father, the naturalist Moisés Santiago Bertoni in the neighborhood of Guillermo Tell, now called Puerto Bertoni in the Alto Paraná Department of Paraguay, along the Paraná River.

Between 1903 and 1906, he served as a professor of zootechnics and zoology at the School of Agriculture and Model Farm, which was opened in 1897 with his father as its director. In 1917, he decided to leave Puerto Bertoni and together with his brother Guillermo Tell they travelled to Asunción where he began to work on his own scientific research, investigating the Paraguayan fauna, chiefly insects (Eumeninae, Polistinae, Masarinae, Sphecinae and Trigonalidae), as well as vertebrates, especially birds. He also made contributions in paleontology and archaeology.

From 1930 to 1940, he was a professor of zoology, zootechnics, entomology, and plant pathology at the Escuela Superior de Agricultura and at the Escuela Nacional de Agricultura Mariscal Estigarribia. He was a founding member of the Guaraní Academy of Science and Culture.

== Publications ==
- Bertoni, Arnoldo de Winkelried (January 1901). Aves nuevas del Paraguay: continuación á Azara. Asunción, Paraguay: Talleres Nacionales de H. Kraus. pp. 1–216. doi:10.5962/bhl.title.13398.
- Vocabulario zoológico guaraní (Con etimología y nomenclatura técnica). 1910.
- Contribución a la biología de las avispas y abejas del Paraguay (Hymenoptera). 1911.
- Catálogo sistemático de los vertebrados del Paraguay. 1912.
- Fauna paraguaya: catálogos sistemáticos de los vertebrados del Paraguay: peces, batracios, reptiles, aves, y mamíferos conocidos hasta 1913. Asunción: Establecimiento Gráfico M. Brossa, 1914.
- Aves paraguayas poco conocidas. 1925.
- Notas biológicas y sistemáticas sobre algunos insectos útiles. Asunción: Dirección de Agricultura y Defensa Agrícola, 1926.
- Nueva forma de psitácidos del Paraguay. 1927.
