= Prugiasco =

Village in Ticino, Switzerland

Coordinates: 46°28′N 8°55′E

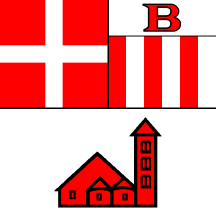
Flag

Prugiasco is a village and former municipality in the canton of Ticino, Switzerland.

Aerial view (1954)

In 2004 the municipality was merged with the other, neighboring municipalities Castro, Corzoneso, Dongio, Largario, Leontica, Lottigna, Marolta and Ponto Valentino to form a new and larger municipality Acquarossa.
