= Corzoneso =

Village and former municipality in Ticino, Switzerland

Coordinates: 46°26′47″N 8°56′4″E

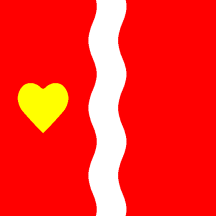
Flag

Corzoneso is a village and former municipality in the canton of Ticino, Switzerland.

It was first recorded in year 1210 as Cursonexe.

The municipality also contained the villages Corzoneso Piano, Casserio and Cumiasca. It had 250 inhabitants in 1682, which increased to 434 in 1836. It then decreased to 369 in 1850, 275 in 1900. It then started to increase again, reaching 322 in 1950 and 506 in 2000.

Photographer Roberto Donetta (1865-1932) was born in Corzoneso.

In 2004 the municipality was merged with the other, neighboring municipalities Castro, Dongio, Largario, Leontica, Lottigna, Marolta, Ponto Valentino and Prugiasco to form a new and larger municipality Acquarossa.
