= Dongio =

Village and former municipality in Acquarossa in the canton of Ticino, Switzerland

Coordinates: 46°26′N 8°57′E

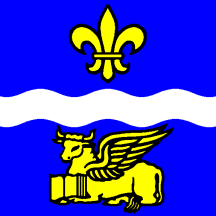
Flag of Dongio

Dongio is a village and former municipality in the canton of Ticino, Switzerland.

It was first recorded in year 1188 as Deuci.

The municipality also contained the villages Marogno and Motto. It had 532 inhabitants in 1682, which decreased to 391 in 1808. It was then stable for the next two centuries, reaching 488 in 1900 and 423 in 2000.

In 2004 the municipality was merged with the other, neighboring municipalities Castro, Corzoneso, Largario, Leontica, Lottigna, Marolta, Ponto Valentino and Prugiasco to form a new and larger municipality Acquarossa.
