= Biasca–Acquarossa railway =

Railway line in Switzerland

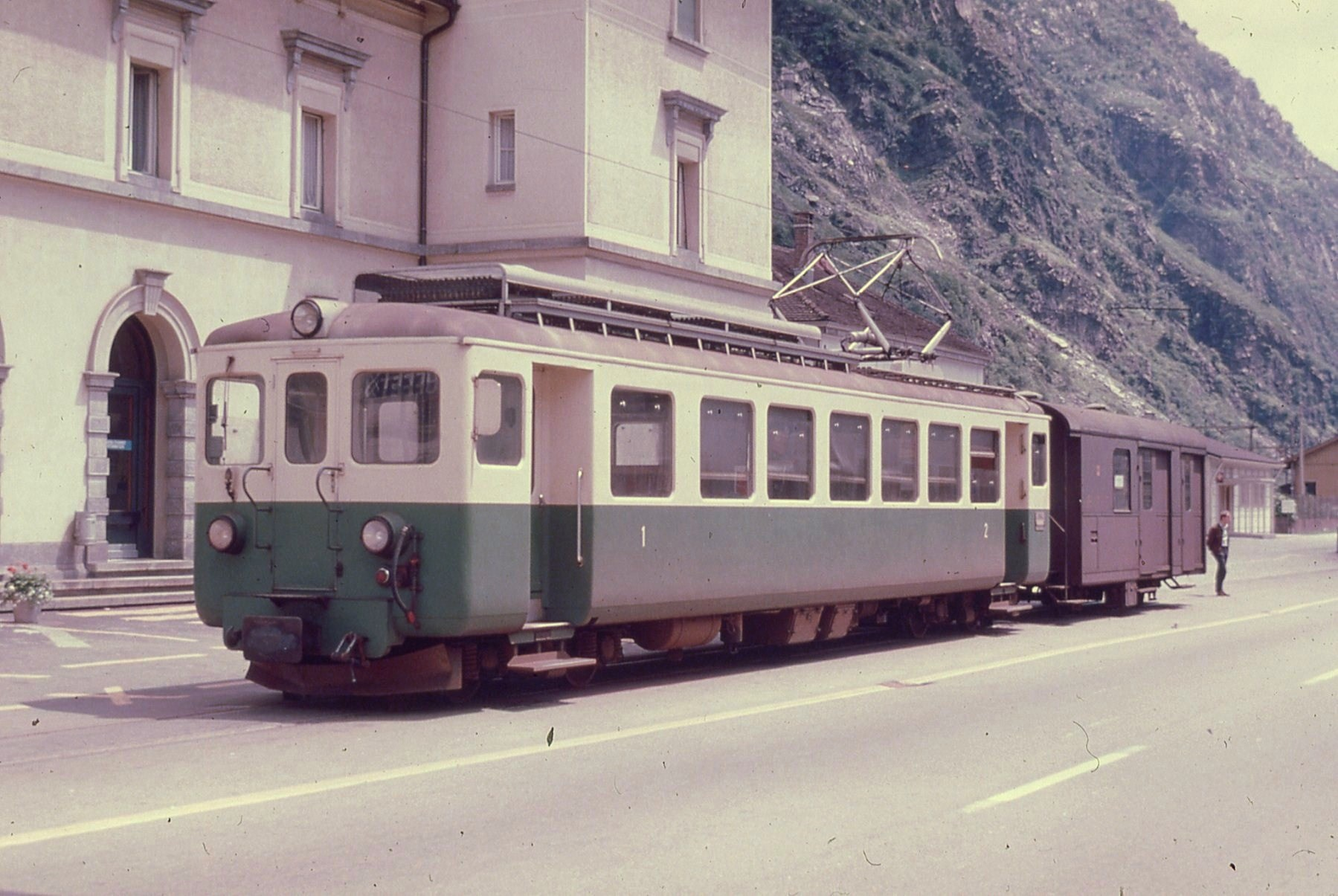
- Train of the Biasca–Acquarossa railway outside Biasca station

Overview
- Status: Closed and removed
- Locale: Canton of Ticino
- Termini: Biasca; Acquarossa
- Stations: 15

History
- Opened: 1911
- Closed: 1973

Technical
- Line length: 13.8 kilometres (8.6 mi)
- Track gauge: 1,000 mm (3 ft 3 3/8 in)
- Minimum radius: 133 metres (436 ft)
- Electrification: 1200 V, DC, overhead
- Maximum incline: 3.5%

The Biasca–Acquarossa railway (Italian: Ferrovia Biasca–Acquarossa; BA) was a Swiss metre gauge railway that linked the towns of Biasca and Acquarossa, in the canton of Ticino.

The Gotthard railway opened in 1882, providing a transport link to the communities of the valley of the Ticino River. In order to provide a link to the communities of the Valle di Blenio, the Biasca–Acquarossa railway was opened in 1911. The line closed in 1973 and was replaced by a bus service.

The line was 13.8 kilometres (8.6 mi) long, and was electrified at 1200 V DC using overhead lines. It commenced from the square in front of Biasca station, had 14 stops, a maximum gradient of 3.5% and a minimum radius of 133 metres (436 ft).

The main depot of the line in Biasca, which was built in the late 1960s, is in use as a bus depot by Autolinee Bleniesi, who operate bus services including those replacing the railway. The line's Acquarossa terminus is also used by the same company.
