= Ponto Valentino =

Village in Ticino, Switzerland

Coordinates: 46°29′N 8°56′E

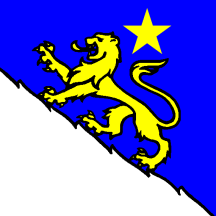
Flag

Ponto Valentino is a village and former municipality in the canton of Ticino, Switzerland.

Aerial view (1953)

In 2004 the municipality was merged with the other, neighboring municipalities Castro, Corzoneso, Dongio, Largario, Leontica, Lottigna, Marolta and Prugiasco to form a new and larger municipality Acquarossa.
