= Largario =

Village in Ticino, Switzerland

Coordinates: 46°29′40″N 8°56′28″E

Largario is a village and former municipality in the canton of Ticino, Switzerland.

Aerial view (1953)

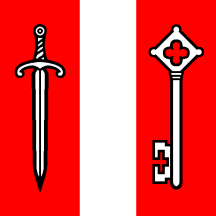
Flag

It was first recorded in year 1207 as Largario.

The municipality had 56 inhabitants in 1602, which peaked at 74 and 75 in 1808 and 1850 respectively before dropping again to 53 in 1900. It decreased further to 36 in 1950, 17 in 1980 when it was the least populous municipality in the entire Switzerland, before it increased to 27 in 1990 which only made it the least populous in Ticino.

In 2004 the municipality was merged with the other, neighboring municipalities Castro, Corzoneso, Dongio, Leontica, Lottigna, Marolta, Ponto Valentino and Prugiasco to form a new and larger municipality Acquarossa.
