= Lottigna =

Coordinates: 46°28′N 8°57′E

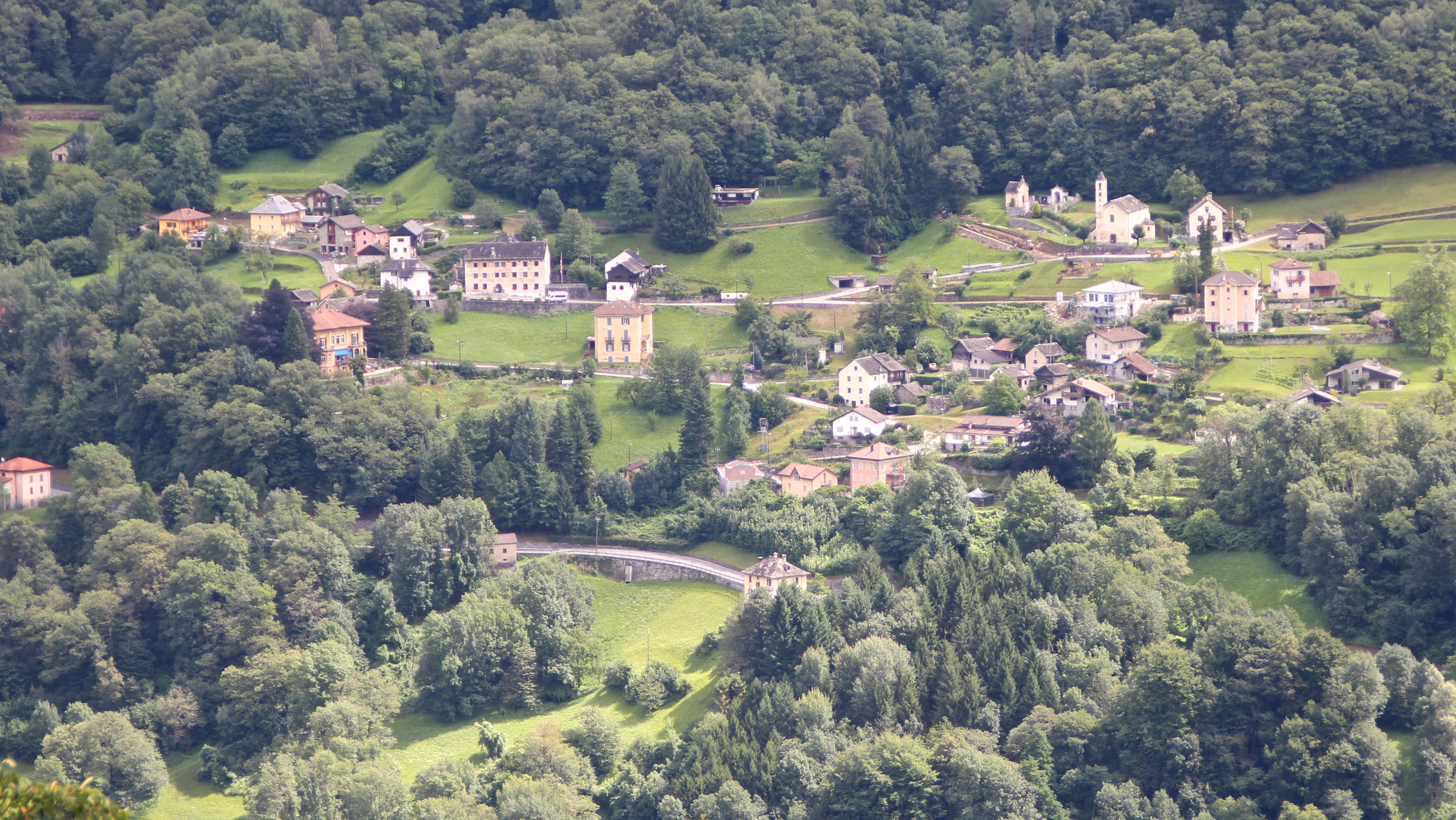
Lottigna

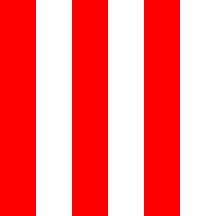
Flag of Lottigna

Lottigna is a village and former municipality in the canton of Ticino, Switzerland.

Aerial view (1953)

It was first recorded in year 1201 as Lotingnia.

The municipality also contained the village Acquarossa. It had 105 inhabitants in 1682, and from 1850 to 1950 the population count remained stable around 130. It then dropped to 79 in both 1970 and 2000.

In 2004 the municipality was merged with the other, neighboring municipalities Castro, Corzoneso, Dongio, Largario, Leontica, Marolta, Ponto Valentino and Prugiasco to form a new and larger municipality Acquarossa, the name taken from the old village in Lottigna.

== Notable people ==
- Moisés Santiago Bertoni, Swiss naturalist
- Pietro Reggiori (1854-1907), president of the London branch of the Ticinese liberal party, co-proprietor of the Reggiori's restaurant in King’s Cross. Mr. Peter Roger, an English hotelier, restaurateur and the great-great-grandson of Alfredo Reggiori and Alma Margherita Marchesi, established an annual award in their memory, the Reggiori-Marchesi Prize, donating to the University of Kent, his alma mater, his financial resources to promote merit and commitment.
