= Acquarossa, Switzerland =

Acquarossa
- Municipality
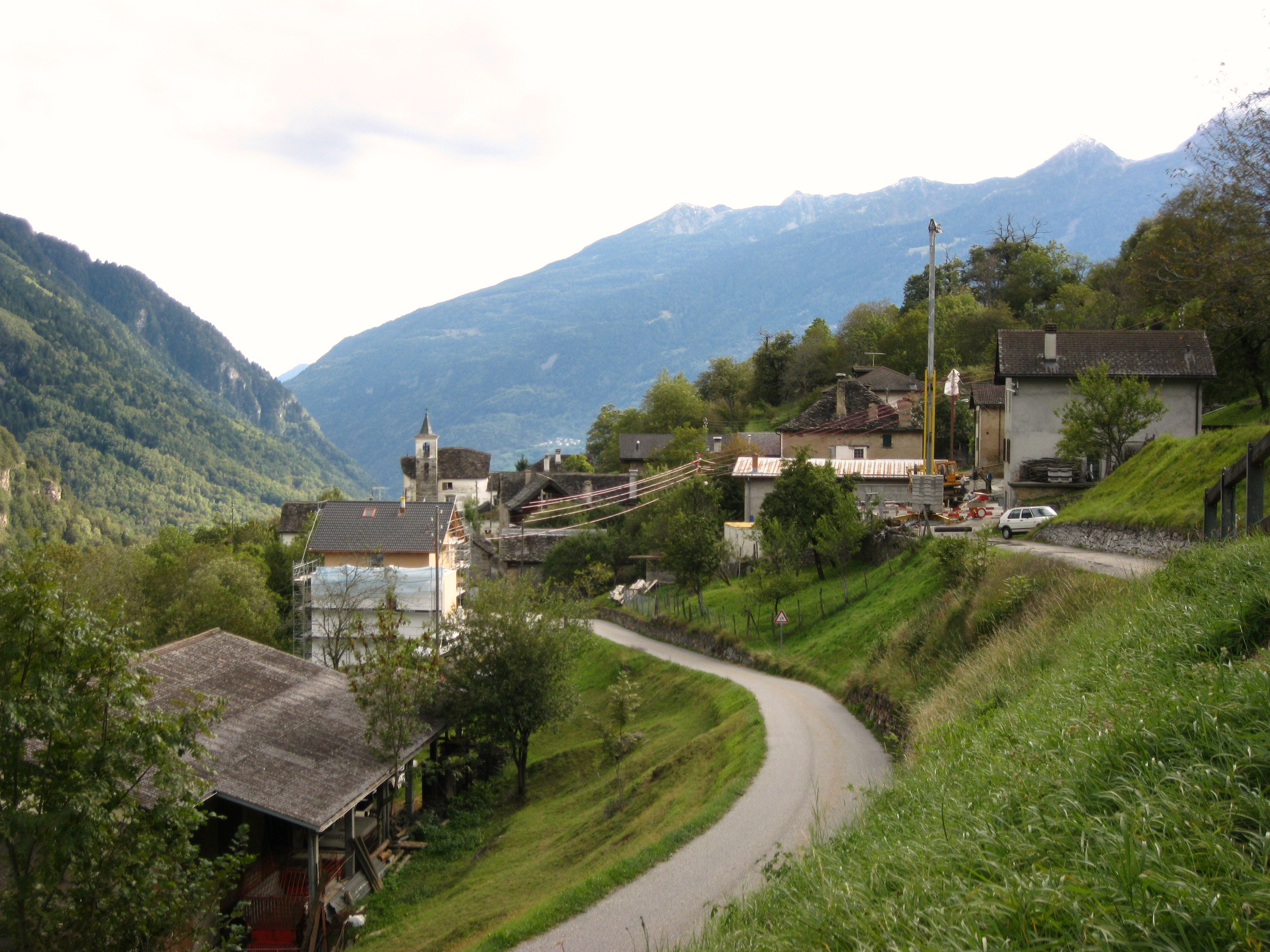
- Largario village

- Flag Coat of arms
- Location of Acquarossa
- Location within Switzerland Location within Canton of Ticino
- Coordinates: 46°27′N 8°56′E
- Country: Switzerland
- Canton: Ticino
- District: Blenio

Government
  - Mayor: Sindaco

Area
  - Total: 61.7 km^{2} (23.8 sq mi)
- Elevation: 528 m (1,732 ft)

Population (2005)
  - Total: 1,875
  - Density: 30.4/km^{2} (78.7/sq mi)
- Time zone: UTC+01:00 (CET)
  - Summer (DST): UTC+02:00 (CEST)
- Postal code: 6716
- SFOS number: 5048
- ISO 3166 code: CH-TI
- Localities: Acquarossa, Dongio, Marogno, Motto Blenio, Corzoneso Piano, Corzoneso, Casserio, Cumiasca, Leontica, Comprovasco, Lottigna, Prugiasco, Castro, Traversa, Marolta, Ponto Valentino, Largario
- Surrounded by: Olivone, Aquila, Torre, Malvaglia, Ludiano, Sobrio, Cavagnago, Anzonico, Faido
- Website: http://www.acquarossa.ch SFSO statistics

Acquarossa is the capital of the district of Blenio in the canton of Ticino in Switzerland.

The municipality was created on 4 April 2004 by a merger of Castro, Corzoneso, Dongio, Largario, Leontica, Lottigna, Ponto Valentino and Prugiasco. The village Acquarossa was located in Lottigna. The name of the new community was selected from the one located at its centre: Acquarossa, a tourist resort.

== History ==
Castro is first mentioned in 1200 as Castri. Corzoneso is first mentioned in 1210 as Cursonexe. Dongio is first mentioned in 1188 as Deuci. Largario is first mentioned in 1207 as Largario. Leontica is first mentioned in 1204 as Levontega. Lottigna is first mentioned in 1201 as Lotingnia. Ponto Valentino is first mentioned in 1200 as Ponto Varentino. In German it was known as Punt. Prugiasco is first mentioned in 1209 as Puliçasco and it was mentioned in 1409 as Pruxiascho.

Between 1906 and 1973, Acquarossa was linked to Biasca, and its station on the Gotthard railway, by the metre gauge Biasca–Acquarossa railway.

== Geography ==
Aerial view (1954)

Acquarossa is located in the Blenio Valley. The surrounding communities are, starting North, following the hands of a watch: Olivone, Aquila, Torre, Malvaglia and Ludiano, as well as Sobrio, Cavagnago, Anzonico and Faido in the district of the Leventina.

== Demographics ==
Acquarossa has a population (as of December 2020) of 1,807. As of 2008, 10.4% of the population are foreign nationals. Over the last 10 years (1997–2007) the population has changed at a rate of 2.4%.

Most of the population (as of 2000) speaks Italian (88.1%), with German being second most common ( 7.0%) and Albanian being third ( 1.6%). As of 2008, the gender distribution of the population was 49.4% male and 50.6% female. The population was made up of 805 Swiss men (43.7% of the population), and 104 (5.6%) non-Swiss men. There were 851 Swiss women (46.2%), and 81 (4.4%) non-Swiss women.

In 2008 there were 7 live births to Swiss citizens and births to non-Swiss citizens, and in same time span there were 23 deaths of Swiss citizens and 1 non-Swiss citizen death. Ignoring immigration and emigration, the population of Swiss citizens decreased by 16 while the foreign population decreased by 1. There was 1 Swiss man and 3 Swiss women who emigrated from Switzerland. At the same time, there were 2 non-Swiss men and 5 non-Swiss women who immigrated from another country to Switzerland. The total Swiss population change in 2008 (from all sources) was a decrease of 13 and the non-Swiss population change was a decrease of 1 people. This represents a population growth rate of -0.8%.

The age distribution, as of 2009, in Acquarossa is; 153 children or 8.3% of the population are between 0 and 9 years old and 204 teenagers or 11.1% are between 10 and 19. Of the adult population, 176 people or 9.6% of the population are between 20 and 29 years old. 218 people or 11.8% are between 30 and 39, 282 people or 15.3% are between 40 and 49, and 209 people or 11.4% are between 50 and 59. The senior population distribution is 246 people or 13.4% of the population are between 60 and 69 years old, 178 people or 9.7% are between 70 and 79, there are 175 people or 9.5% who are over 80.

As of 2000 the average number of residents per living room was 0.54 which is fewer people per room than the cantonal average of 0.6 per room. In this case, a room is defined as space of a housing unit of at least 4 m^{2} (43 sq ft) as normal bedrooms, dining rooms, living rooms, kitchens and habitable cellars and attics. About 63.8% of the total households were owner occupied, or in other words did not pay rent (though they may have a mortgage or a rent-to-own agreement).

As of 2000, there were 730 private households in the municipality, and an average of 2.3 persons per household. The vacancy rate for the municipality, in 2008, was 0.12%. As of 2007, the construction rate of new housing units was 3.2 new units per 1000 residents.

== Election ==
In the 2007 federal election the most popular party was the CVP which received 36.35% of the vote. The next three most popular parties were the FDP (25.24%), the Ticino League (15.35%) and the SP (13.48%). In the federal election, a total of 555 votes were cast, and the voter turnout was 38.9%.

In the 2007 Ticino Gran Consiglio election, there were a total of 1,446 registered voters in Acquarossa, of which 771 or 53.3% voted. 14 blank ballots and 1 null ballots were cast, leaving 756 valid ballots in the election. The most popular party was the PPD+GenGiova which received 196 or 25.9% of the vote. The next three most popular parties were; the PLRT (with 151 or 20.0%), the SSI (with 131 or 17.3%) and the LEGA (with 127 or 16.8%).

In the 2007 Ticino Consiglio di Stato election, there were 6 blank ballots and 1 null ballots, which left 764 valid ballots in the election. The most popular party was the PPD which received 198 or 25.9% of the vote. The next three most popular parties were; the LEGA (with 173 or 22.6%), the PLRT (with 143 or 18.7%) and the PS (with 121 or 15.8%).

== Education ==
In Acquarossa about 64.3% of the population (between age 25–64) have completed either non-mandatory upper secondary education or additional higher education (either university or a Fachhochschule).

In Acquarossa there are a total of 305 students (as of 2009). The Ticino education system provides up to three years of non-mandatory kindergarten and in Acquarossa there are 36 children in kindergarten. The primary school program lasts for five years and includes both a standard school and a special school. In the municipality, 93 students attend the standard primary schools and 4 students attend the special school. In the lower secondary school system, students either attend a two-year middle school followed by a two-year pre-apprenticeship or they attend a four-year program to prepare for higher education. There are 87 students in the two-year middle school and in their pre-apprenticeship, while 20 students are in the four-year advanced program.

The upper secondary school includes several options, but at the end of the upper secondary program, a student will be prepared to enter a trade or to continue on to a university or college. In Ticino, vocational students may either attend school while working on their internship or apprenticeship (which takes three or four years) or may attend school followed by an internship or apprenticeship (which takes one year as a full-time student or one and a half to two years as a part-time student). There are 11 vocational students who are attending school full-time and 47 who attend part-time.

The professional program lasts three years and prepares a student for a job in engineering, nursing, computer science, business, tourism and similar fields. There are 7 students in the professional program.

== Employment ==
Watchmaking workshops and small watch companies, e.g. Adriatica in Dongio, provide jobs to a good part of the population.

As of 2007, Acquarossa had an unemployment rate of 3.13%. As of 2005, there were 99 people employed in the primary economic sector and about 43 businesses involved in this sector. 155 people are employed in the secondary sector and there are 27 businesses in this sector. 472 people are employed in the tertiary sector, with 62 businesses in this sector.

Of the working population, 4.4% used public transportation to get to work, and 65% used a private car.

As of 2009, there were 3 hotels in Acquarossa.

== Places of interest ==
Well above Prugiasco stands the Romanesque church of San Carlo di Negrentino (up to 1702: cant "Sant' Ambrogio"), begun in the 11th century and completed in the 12th. It is noted for its Romanesque and Gothic frescoes.

== International relations ==
Acquarossa is twinned with the following cities (date of agreement shown in parentheses).

- Presidente Franco District, Paraguay (2018)

== Historical Population ==
The historical population is given in the following table:

Year	Population Castro	Population Corzoneso	Population Dongio	Population Largario	Population Leontica	Population Lottigna	Population Ponto Valentino	Population Prugiasco
1567	68	-	-	-	-	-	342	205
1602	-	-	-	56	315	-	300	125
1682	-	250	532	-	-	-	-	-
1808	114	-	391	74	441	101	-	-
1850	129	369	495	75	473	136	518	333
1900	97	275	488	53	395	125	424	214
1950	81	322	-	36	408	131	-	-
1970	62	-	-	-	-	79	-	-
1990	-	-	440	-	-	-	-	-
2000	-	-	423	-	-	79	-	136

== Climate ==
Climate data for Acquarossa, elevation 575 m (1,886 ft), (1991–2020)
Month	Jan	Feb	Mar	Apr	May	Jun	Jul	Aug	Sep	Oct	Nov	Dec	Year
Mean daily maximum °C (°F)	5.7 (42.3)	7.2 (45.0)	12.0 (53.6)	15.0 (59.0)	19.2 (66.6)	23.2 (73.8)	25.6 (78.1)	24.8 (76.6)	20.3 (68.5)	15.1 (59.2)	9.6 (49.3)	6.3 (43.3)	15.3 (59.5)
Daily mean °C (°F)	1.5 (34.7)	2.5 (36.5)	6.6 (43.9)	9.8 (49.6)	13.6 (56.5)	17.1 (62.8)	19.3 (66.7)	18.5 (65.3)	14.8 (58.6)	10.4 (50.7)	5.5 (41.9)	2.3 (36.1)	10.2 (50.4)
Mean daily minimum °C (°F)	−1.9 (28.6)	−1.3 (29.7)	1.9 (35.4)	4.7 (40.5)	8.5 (47.3)	11.6 (52.9)	13.6 (56.5)	13.3 (55.9)	10.3 (50.5)	6.6 (43.9)	1.9 (35.4)	−1.0 (30.2)	5.7 (42.3)
Average precipitation mm (inches)	57.4 (2.26)	44.2 (1.74)	58.9 (2.32)	103.8 (4.09)	129.5 (5.10)	130.1 (5.12)	124.7 (4.91)	161.0 (6.34)	127.4 (5.02)	135.7 (5.34)	141.0 (5.55)	69.6 (2.74)	1,283.3 (50.52)
Average snowfall cm (inches)	18.9 (7.4)	13.1 (5.2)	3.7 (1.5)	1.5 (0.6)	0.0 (0.0)	0.0 (0.0)	0.0 (0.0)	0.0 (0.0)	0.0 (0.0)	0.0 (0.0)	3.5 (1.4)	23.4 (9.2)	64.1 (25.2)
Average precipitation days (≥ 1.0 mm)	5.4	4.9	6.1	8.4	11.4	10.2	8.8	9.8	7.7	8.5	7.6	6.5	95.3
Average relative humidity (%)	66	61	58	61	69	70	70	74	76	78	73	68	69
Mean monthly sunshine hours	85.3	97.1	128.7	130.9	130.4	149.5	168.5	152.8	124.7	94.8	72.3	73.9	1,408.9
Source 1: NOAA
Source 2: MeteoSwiss (precipitation days and snow 1981–2010)
