= Martino Traversa (footballer) =

Italian footballer

Personal information
- Date of birth: 6 February 1974 (age 52)
- Place of birth: Bari, Italy
- Height: 1.74 m (5 ft 9 in)
- Position: Defender

Youth career
- l'Adriatico Calcio

Senior career*
Years	Team	Apps	(Gls)
1990–1992	Bologna	14	(0)
1992–1993	AC Milan	0	(0)
1993–1994	Bologna	9	(0)
1994–1995	Barletta	30	(1)
1995–1996	Pescara	32	(1)
1996–1998	Perugia	41	(0)
1998–2000	Lecce	49	(1)
2000	Siena	11	(0)
2000–2001	Sampdoria	37	(1)
2001–2002	Cosenza	18	(0)
2002–2003	Fiorentina	28	(1)
2003–2004	Martina	26	(1)
2006–2007	Casarano		
2007–2008	Lavello		
2008–2009	Liberty Bari		
2009–2010	Real Altamura		
Total		295+	(6+)

Managerial career
- 2014–2017: Bari (youth)
- 2017–2018: Vigor Moles
- 2019–: Molfetta Calcio (assistant)
- * Club domestic league appearances and goals

Martino Traversa (born 6 February 1974) is an Italian former professional footballer who played as a defender.

== Career ==
Traversa started his career at just 16 years old, with Bologna in the 1990-91 season, which led to him being signed by AC Milan, but without playing once he returned to Bologna. He also played in Serie A for Perugia and Lecce, in addition to being part of the Serie C2 champion squad with the recently refounded Fiorentina Viola. After retiring as a player, he worked as an assistant in Bari's youth sectors and currently holds various roles at Molfetta Calcio.

== Honours ==
Fiorentina

- Serie C2: 2002–03 (group B)
