= Martino Traversa (composer) =

Italian composer (born 1960)

Martino Traversa (born 1960) is a composer of classical, electronic and electroacoustic music.

Martino Traversa has studied piano, composition, electronic music, and information technology. He graduated in Improvisation Technique at the "Accademia di Alto Perfezionamento" in Pescara. He attended to 3-yearly summer courses in Siena. Has studied at Salzburg's Mozarteum and at CCRMA (Center for Computer Research in Music and Acoustic) at Stanford University.

He studied with Luigi Nono from 1987 to 1989. In 1990, he founded and managed Ensemble Edgard Varèse, with Luigi Nono's support. In 1991, he launched "Traiettorie", an international festival of modern and contemporary music. In 1999, Martino Traversa founded the Prometeo Foundation, a resident laboratory of cultural activities, related to physiques, arts and philosophy.

He regularly composes and researches the field of electronics applied to musical acoustic. Martino Traversa is professor of music at the University of Parma.

Traversa's CDs are published by Kairos, Stradivarius, and Neos.

== Selected compositions ==
- Octeur
- 4d
- Bianco, ma non troppo
- Rimane l'eco
- Manhattan Bridge
- Come un suono, dal suono del mondo
- Dopo il respiro
- Landscape
- Quadrato bianco, su sfondo bianco

== Selected compositions – electroacoustic music ==
- Bianco, ma non troppo
- Quartetto per viola sola
- Fragment 1, for alto and live electronic
- Fragment 2, for sax and live electronic

== Selected compositions – electronic music ==
- Poeme electronique
- Bianco
- Variazioni sopra un labirinto
- Critical_Path
- Esclepion
- NGC 253
