= Blenio Valley =

River valley in Switzerland

Coordinates: 46°25′39″N 8°58′11″E

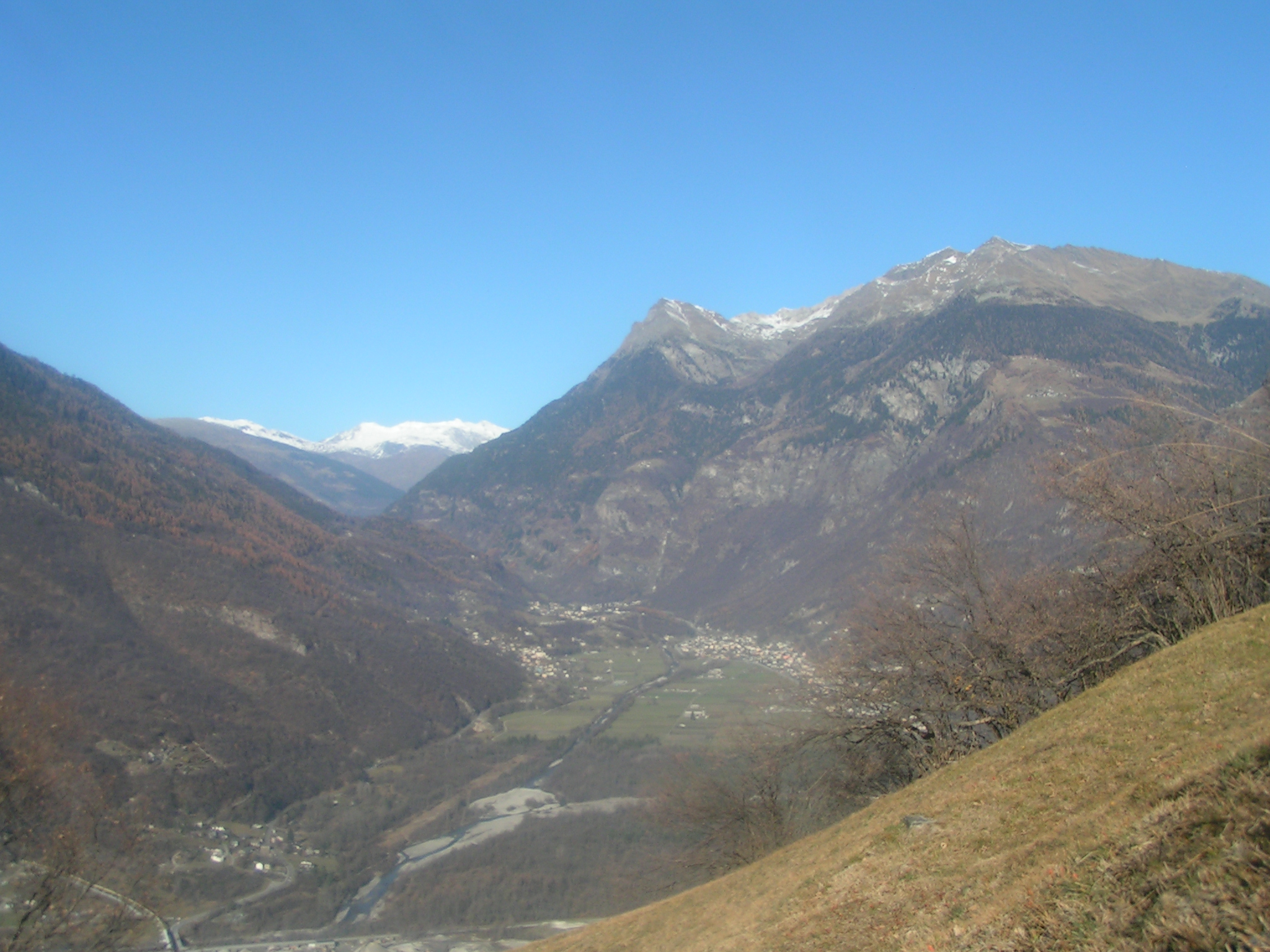
The Blenio Valley

The Blenio Valley (Italian: Valle di Blenio) is a valley of the Lepontine Alps in the Swiss canton of Ticino. The valley contains the river Brenno. The upper valley, between Lai da Sontga Maria and Olivone, is named Valle Santa Maria.
