= Dent de Brenleire =

Mountain in Switzerland

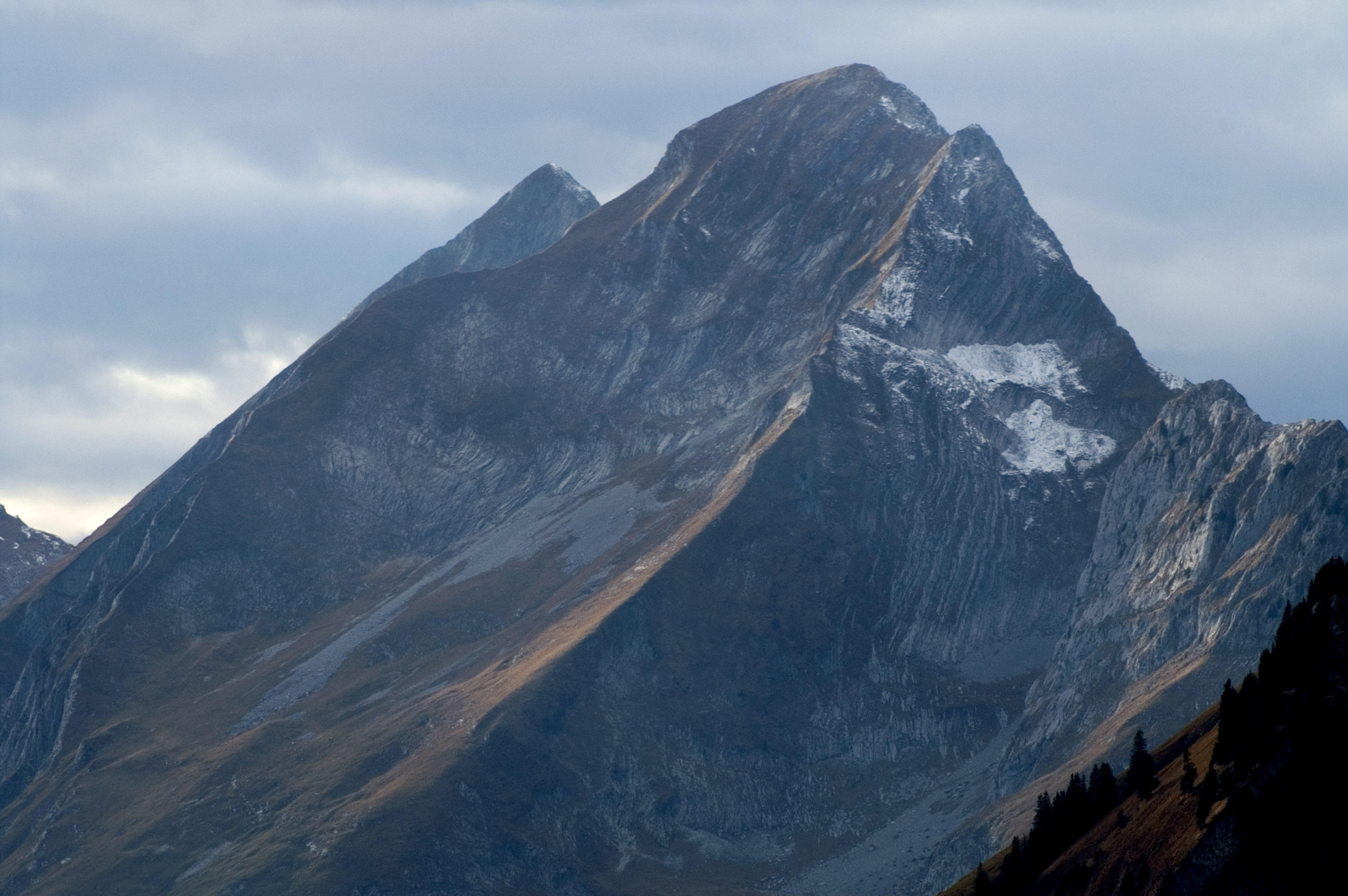
- Dent de Brenleire and Dent de Folliéran behind

Highest point
- Elevation: 2,354 m (7,723 ft)
- Prominence: 275 m (902 ft)
- Parent peak: Vanil Noir
- Coordinates: 46°33′3″N 7°10′29.2″E

Geography
- Location within Switzerland
- Location: Fribourg, Switzerland
- Parent range: Fribourg Alps

The Dent de Brenleire (French pronunciation: [dɑ̃ d(ə) bʁɑ̃lɛːʁ]; lit. 'Tooth of Branleire') is a mountain of the Fribourg Alps, located south of Charmey in the Swiss canton of Fribourg. It has an elevation of 2,354 metres above sea level and is amongst the highest summits in the canton of Fribourg, after the Vanil Noir, the Vanil de l'Ecri and the Pointe de Paray. It is also the highest mountain entirely within the canton.

The summit of the Dent de Brenleire is accessible by a trail running on the east side of the mountain, from the Gros Mont.
