= Dent de Folliéran =

Mountain in Switzerland

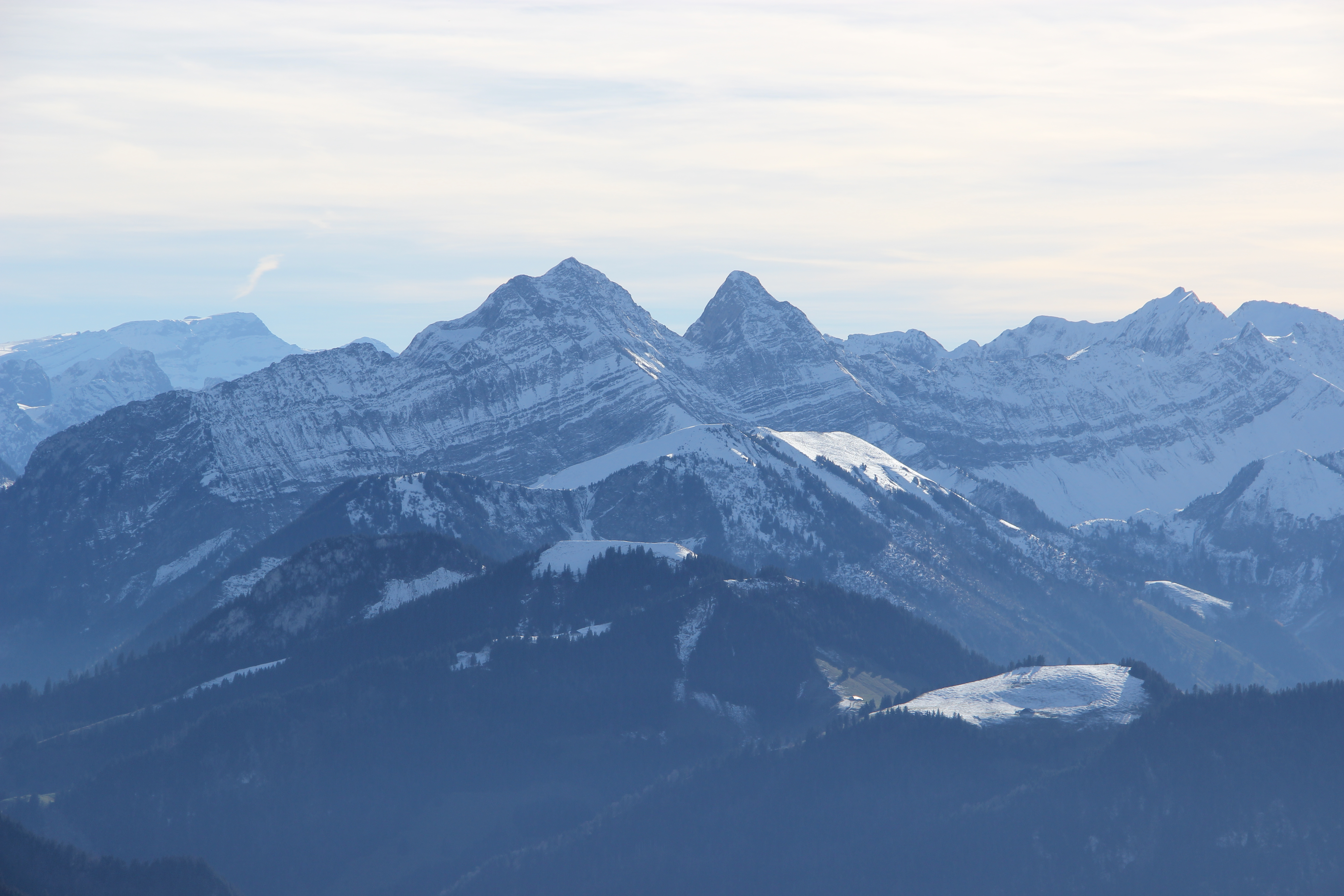
- Dent de Brenleire and Dent de Follieran

Highest point
- Elevation: 2,340 m (7,680 ft)
- Prominence: 226 m (741 ft)
- Parent peak: Dent de Brenleire
- Coordinates: 46°32′49″N 7°10′6″E

Geography
- Location within Switzerland
- Location: Fribourg, Switzerland
- Parent range: Fribourg Alps

The Dent de Folliéran (2,340 m) is a mountain of the Fribourg Alps, located south of Charmey in the Swiss canton of Fribourg. It lies on the chain connecting the Vanil Noir to the Dent de Brenleire. It is one of the five summits above 2,300 metres in the canton, the other being the Vanil Noir, the Vanil de L'Ecri, the Pointe de Paray and the Dent de Brenleire.
