= Dent du Chamois =

Mountain in Switzerland

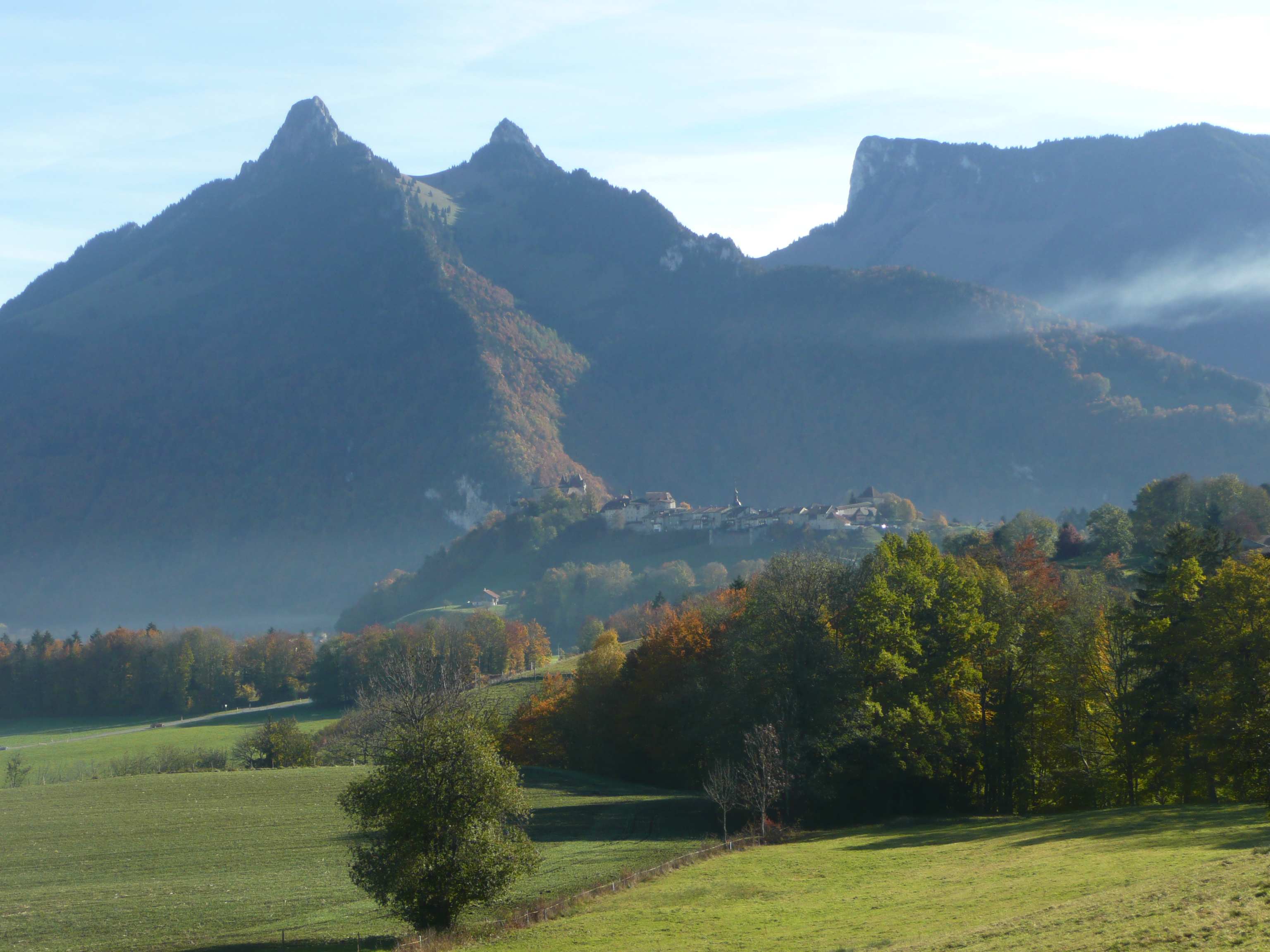
- From left to right: Dent de Broc, Dent du Chamois and Dent du Bourgo

Highest point
- Elevation: 1,839 m (6,033 ft)
- Prominence: 293 m (961 ft)
- Parent peak: Vanil Noir
- Coordinates: 46°35′4″N 7°7′53″E

Geography
- Location within Switzerland
- Location: Fribourg, Switzerland
- Parent range: Swiss Prealps

Climbing
- Easiest route: Trail

The Dent du Chamois (1,839 m) is a mountain of the Swiss Prealps, located east of Gruyères in the canton of Fribourg. It lies on the range north of the Vanil Noir, between the valleys of the Sarine and the Motélon.

From the col of La Forcla (1,546 m), a trail leads to its summit.
