= Gros Mont =

- Location within Switzerland
- Elevation: 1,404 metres (4,606 ft)
- Traversed by: Road

Third Approach
- Location: Fribourg, Switzerland
- Range: Alps
- Coordinates: 46°32′54″N 07°11′42″E

Gros Mont is an alp and mountain pass of the Swiss Alps, located south of Charmey in the canton of Fribourg. The alp lies at the upper end of the Vallée du Gros Mont, just north of a 1,404 m (4,606 ft) high pass connecting Charmey with Rougemont (in the canton of Vaud). This mountain pass, on the watershed between the Jogne and the upper Sarine, is the lowest point between the massifs of the Vanil Noir and the Gastlosen.
