= Jeanne Niquille =

Swiss historian and archivist

- Born: 1 July 1894; Fribourg, Switzerland
- Died: 9 September 1970 (aged 76); Fribourg, Switzerland
- Occupations: Historian, archivist, journalist
- Known for: Works on the history of Canton of Fribourg

Jeanne Niquille (1 July 1894 – 9 September 1970) was a Swiss historian, archivist, and journalist. She worked as an archivist at the Fribourg State Archives from 1918 to 1957 and published extensively on the history of the Canton of Fribourg, though she was never granted the official title of State Archivist despite her significant contributions to the field.

== Early life and education ==
Niquille was born on 1 July 1894 in Fribourg to Casimir Niquille, a forestry engineer, and Pauline Quartenoud, a teacher. After the early death of her father, she and her four siblings were raised by their uncle, Abbé Jean Quartenoud, who ensured they all received university educations. She obtained her teaching certificate in 1910, then studied at Collège Sainte-Croix from 1910 to 1914. She subsequently attended the University of Fribourg from 1914 to 1918, earning a doctorate in history.

== Career ==
In 1918, Niquille was appointed as an archivist at the State Archives of Fribourg, a position she held until 1957. In 1927, she served as scientific adviser to the Fribourg committee of the Saffa (Swiss Exhibition for Women's Work). She produced a substantial body of historical and journalistic work, including an anonymously published history of the Canton of Fribourg in 1941 (Un siècle d'histoire fribourgeoise). She contributed numerous articles to the Revue suisse d'histoire and was the first woman to be published in the Revue d'histoire ecclésiastique suisse, appearing in its pages as early as 1916. She also served as editor of the "Il y a cent ans" (A Hundred Years Ago) section of the daily newspaper La Liberté.

Despite the volume and scientific quality of her work, Niquille was never granted the position or title of State Archivist.
