= Dent de Broc =

Mountain in Switzerland

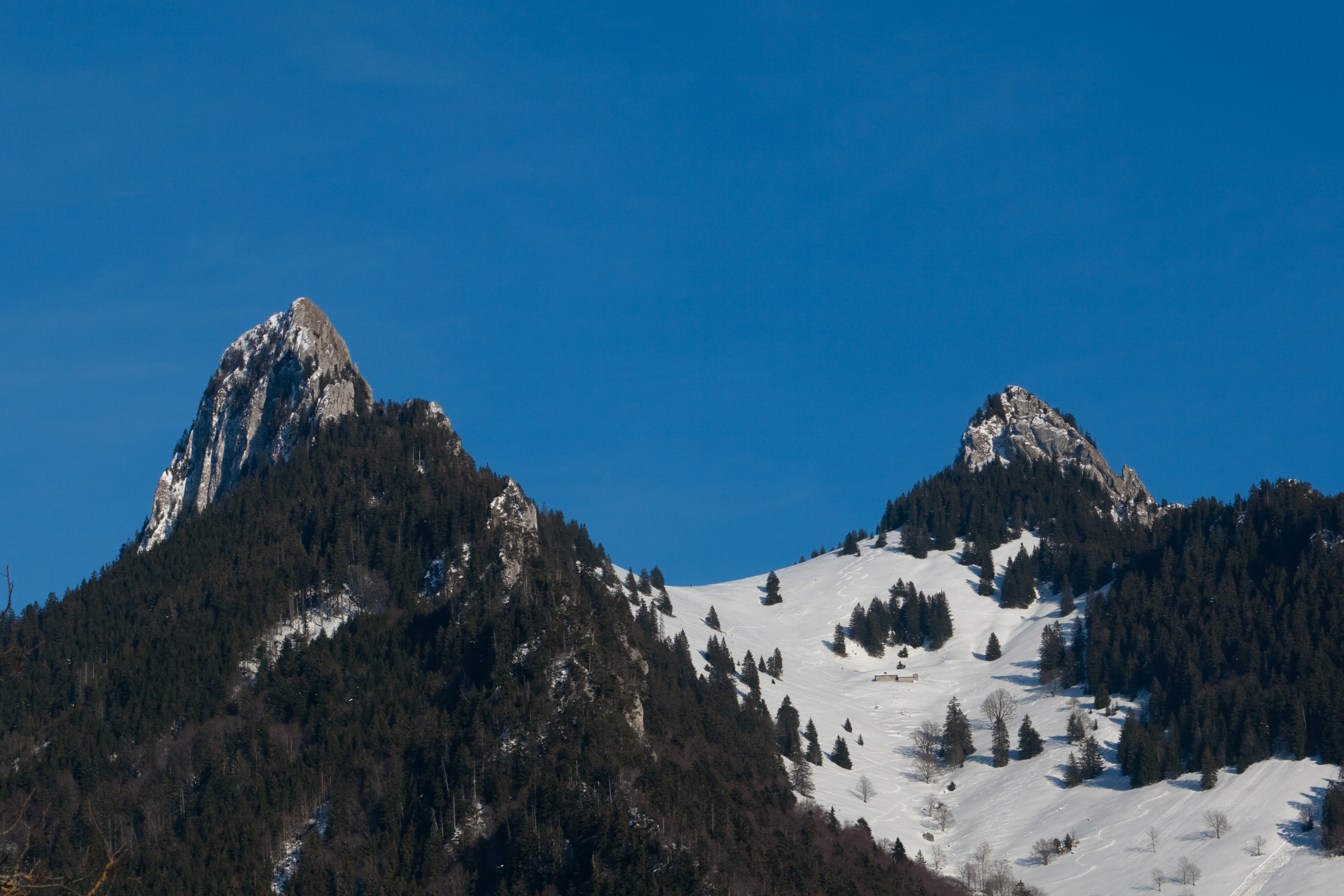
- Dent de Broc (left) and Dent du Chamois (right)

Highest point
- Elevation: 1,829 m (6,001 ft)
- Prominence: 161 m (528 ft)
- Parent peak: Dent du Chamois
- Coordinates: 46°35′19″N 7°7′40″E

Geography
- Location within Switzerland
- Location: Fribourg, Switzerland
- Parent range: Swiss Prealps

Climbing
- Easiest route: Trail

The Dent de Broc (1,829 m) is a mountain of the Swiss Prealps, overlooking Broc and the Lake of Gruyère in the canton of Fribourg. It lies on the range north of the Vanil Noir, between the valleys of the Sarine and the Motélon.

From the Col des Combes (1,668 m), a trail leads to its summit.
