= Dent du Bourgo =

Mountain in Switzerland

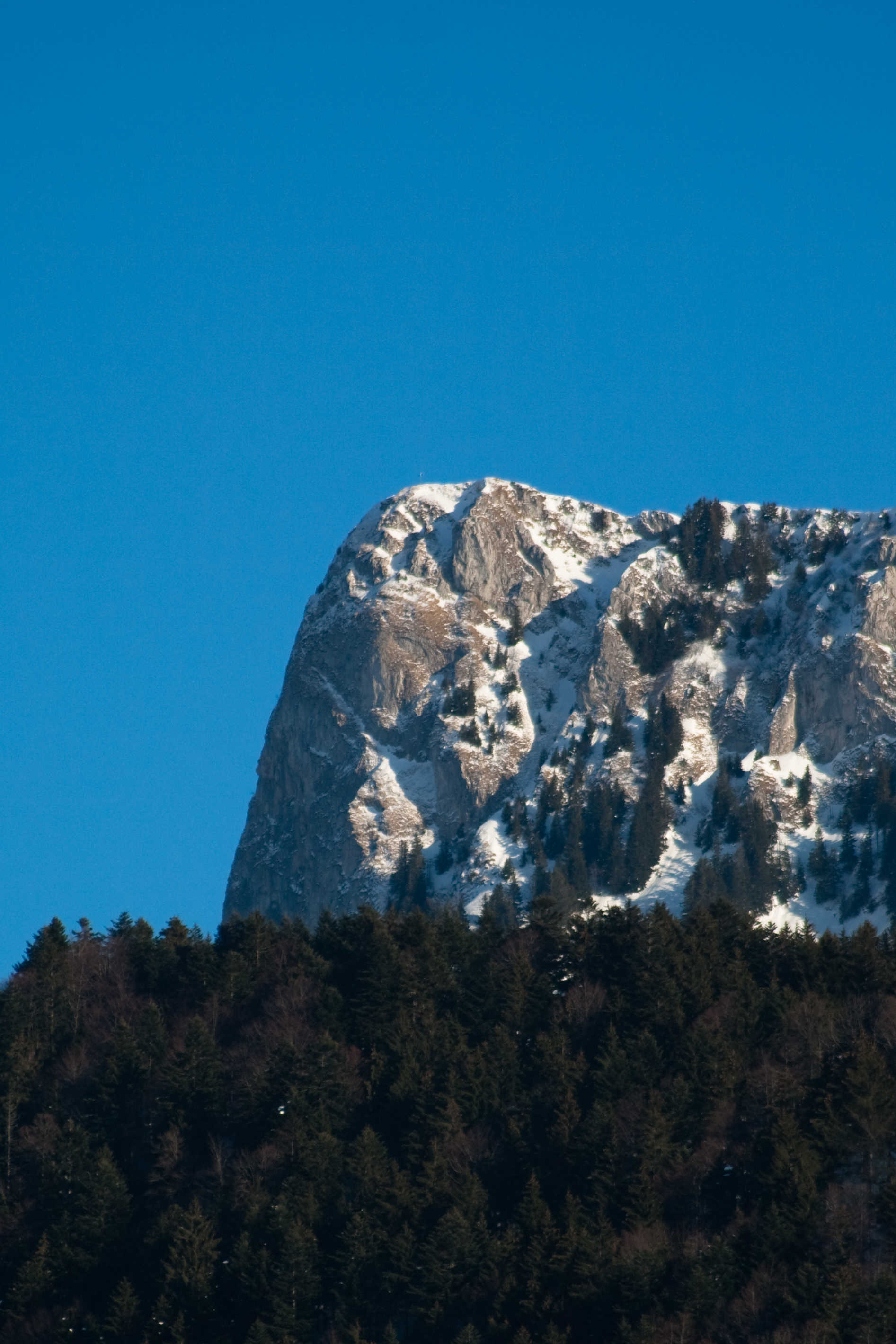
- The north face

Highest point
- Elevation: 1,909 m (6,263 ft)
- Prominence: 174 m (571 ft)
- Parent peak: Vanil Noir
- Coordinates: 46°34′32″N 7°8′23″E

Geography
- Location within Switzerland
- Location: Fribourg, Switzerland
- Parent range: Swiss Prealps

Climbing
- Easiest route: Trail

The Dent du Bourgo (1,909 m) is a mountain of the Swiss Prealps, located east of Gruyères in the canton of Fribourg. It lies on the range north of the Vanil Noir, between the valleys of the Sarine and the Motélon.
