= Vanil de l'Ecri =

Mountain in Switzerland

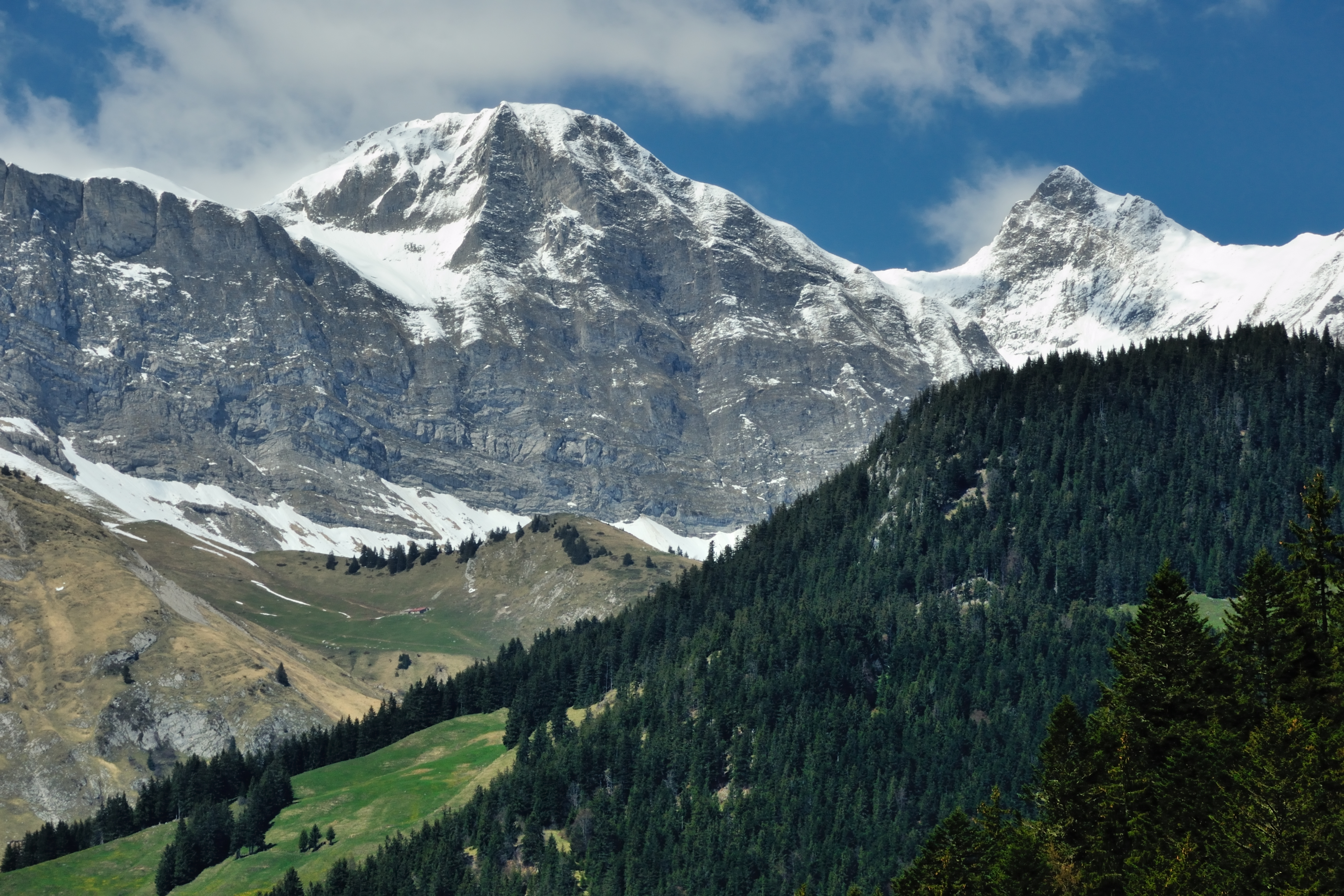
- View from the south with the Vanil Noir (right)

Highest point
- Elevation: 2,376 m (7,795 ft)
- Prominence: 140 m (460 ft)
- Parent peak: Vanil Noir
- Coordinates: 46°31′20″N 07°08′37″E

Geography
- Location within Switzerland
- Location: Fribourg/Vaud, Switzerland
- Parent range: Swiss Prealps

The Vanil de l'Ecri is a mountain of the Swiss Prealps, located on the border between the cantons of Fribourg and Vaud. Reaching a height of 2,376 metres above sea level, it is both the second highest summit of the Vanil Noir massif and the canton of Fribourg. The mountain lies between the Pointe de Paray and the Vanil Noir.

The closest localities are Grandvillard (Fribourg) and Château d'Oex (Vaud).
