= Fribourg State Archives (Switzerland) =

- Archives de l'État de Fribourg Staatsarchiv Freiburg
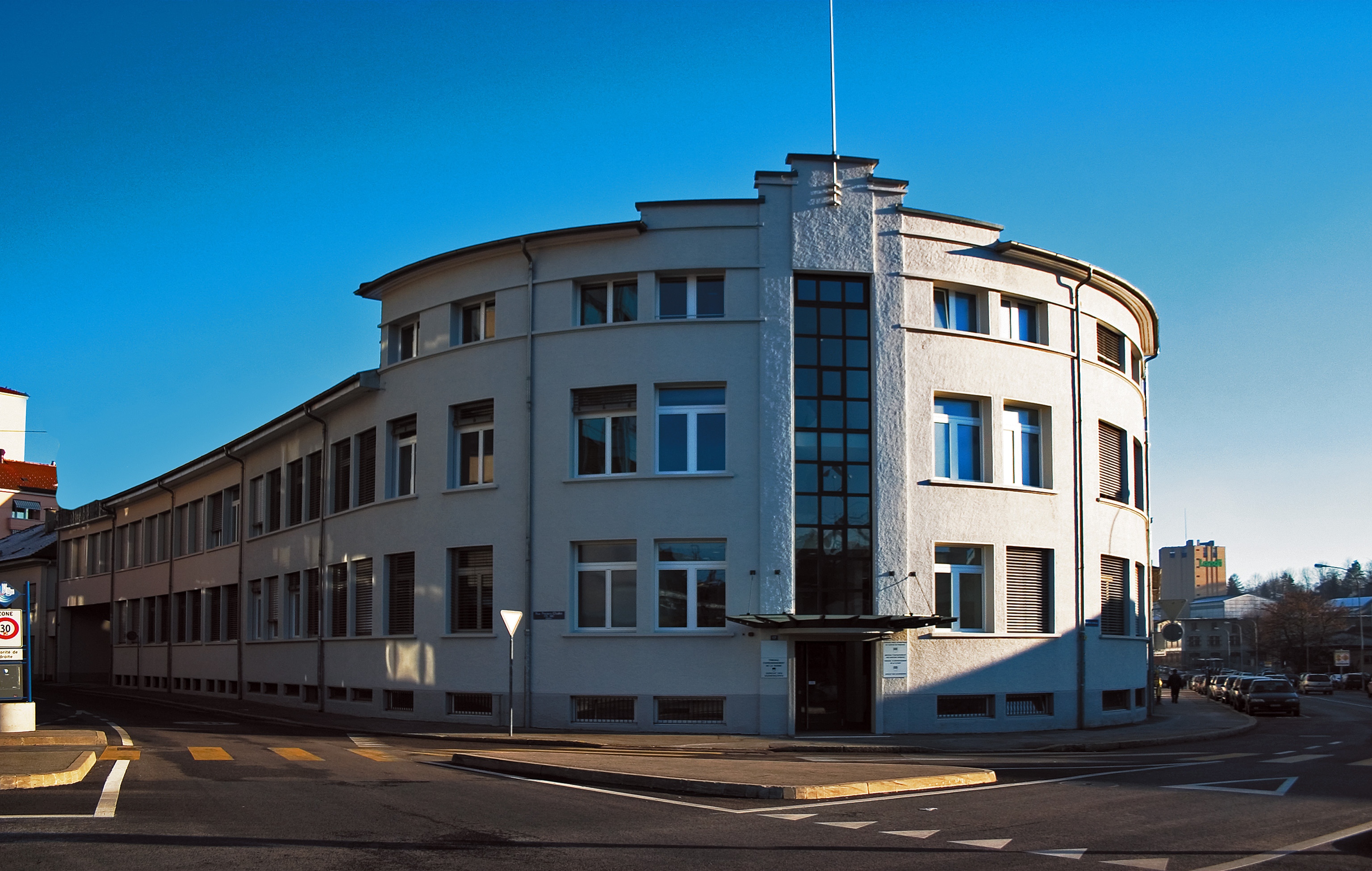
- Abbreviation: AEF
- Formation: 1747
- Founded at: Fribourg, Switzerland
- Type: State Archives
- Purpose: Conservation of Historical and State documents
- Location: Route des Arsenaux 17, 1700 Fribourg, Switzerland
- Coordinates: 46.7983°N 7.1499°E
- Region served: Fribourg (CH)
- Official language: French & German
- Archiviste cantonal: Alexandre Dafflon
- Website: www.fr.ch/aef

The Fribourg State Archives (French Archives de l'État de Fribourg or AEF) is the cantonal archives of the Canton of Fribourg, in Switzerland. It oversees the composition of historical archives concerning the cantonal administration and authorities, ensuring their conservation and facilitating their consultation.

The archives conserved by the AEF are registered as a cultural property of national significance in Switzerland.

== History ==
The AEF consists of one of the principle historical heritages of Fribourg, as its origins date back to the foundation of Fribourg, by the duke Berthold IV von Zähringen, in 1157. From this point on, it benefited until 1798 from contributions by the authorities of the city state as well as being enriched by the land obtained by the state. In 1747, the AEF gained administrative autonomy and the position of State archivist was created in 1804.

Since the end of the old regime, the AEF has conserved the official archives from the cantonal authorities and the cantonal administrations, which are from this point distinct from those of the town of Fribourg.

The documents of the City-Republic, as well as those of the Canton of Fribourg were first conserved in the “maison de justice”, in the city hall situated at this time behind the Cathedral of St. Nicholas. They were then transferred in 1478 to the new buildings of the chancellery. The AEF were moved in 1917 to the Augustinian monastery in the Old City of Fribourg before being moved in 2003 to its current site, “L’Industrielle”, an old box making factory situated in the vicinity of the train station.

== Missions and activities ==
As a core service of the State, the AEF has as its main mission to evaluate, collect, conserve and to catalog all resources originating from various State authorities that may be of interest as a source of information or as evidence. It has equally got the mission of making these resources available to the public all the while respecting legal requirements in respect to the right of access.

The AEF is also charged with preserving the documented collective memory of Fribourg, in particular through the means of safeguarding archival holdings from private sources, these could be archives from a person, a family, a company, an association, a political party or even a trade union.

The AEF is also a cultural institution and has the specific task of accommodating researchers and to take on multiple collaborations with the relevant actors involved with the cultural life within as well as outside of the Canton of Fribourg. It cooperates in the cultural and scientific fields, in particular with other archives, museums, libraries, other cultural institutions, universities and research centers, societies and other partners.

== Holdings and collections ==
The Fribourg State Archives conserves 15.3 linear kilometers of documents as of 2016. These include the archives of the Medieval City-State until the end of the old regime (1798), the holdings of the Cantonal administration up until our time, as well as private holdings and collections.

The AEF archive plan includes the following categories:

- Middle Ages and Old Regime
- Helvetic Republic
- 19th and 20th Century (Cantonal administration)
- Cantonal administration (from 2015)
- Judicial power (from 1803)
- Notary's protocols
- Special holdings (maps and plans, chronicles, literature)
- Other public bodies (town councils and parishes)
- Private holdings (companies, societies, families, etc.)
- Collections (State prints, photographs, post cards, etc.)

=== Noteworthy holdings and documents ===
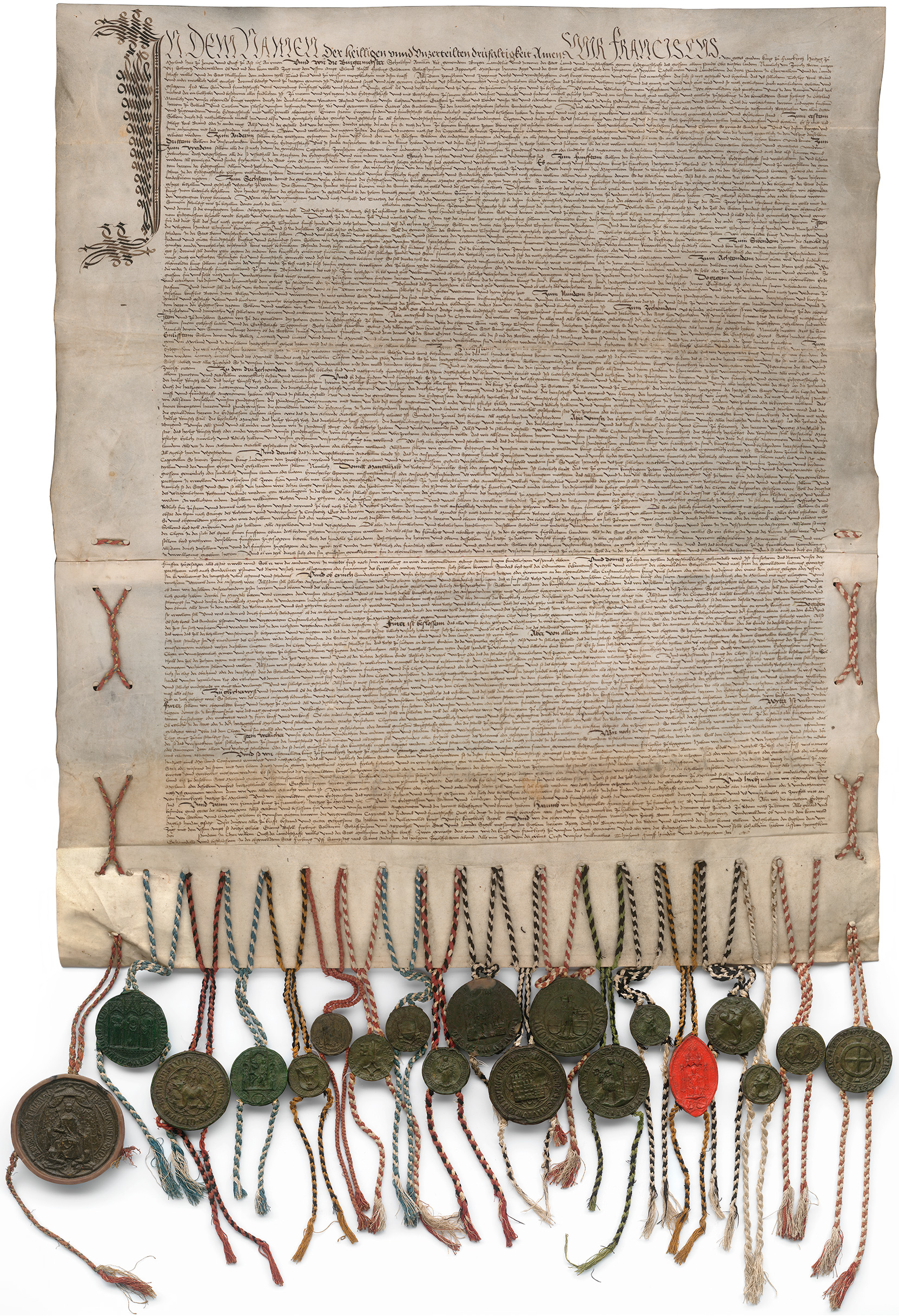

- Notary's protocols
- Fribourg Treaty (1516), known as the treaty of "perpetual peace"
- Book of Flags
- Schwabenspiegel
- Marcello holdings (documents of Adèle Castiglione Colonna, born d'Affry, known as Marcello)

== Research tools ==
- The Fribourg State Archives website
- The AEF online inventory
- Nicolas Morard and Hubert Foerster, Guide des Archives de l'État de Fribourg, Fribourg, 1986, 104 p.
- Swiss press online

== Bibliography ==
- Nicolas Morard and Hubert Foerster, Guide des Archives de l'État de Fribourg, Fribourg, 1986, 104 p.
- Leonardo Broillet, Mes Aïeux! Guide des recherches généalogiques et biographiques aux Archives de l'État de Fribourg, 144 p. (Archives de la Société d'histoire du canton de Fribourg, nouvelle série, vol. 8)
- « Connaissez-vous? — Schon bekannt? ». Data sheets of the Fribourg State Archive about related topics to the history of the Canton and to documents conserved at the AEF.
