= Pointe de Paray =

Mountain in Switzerland

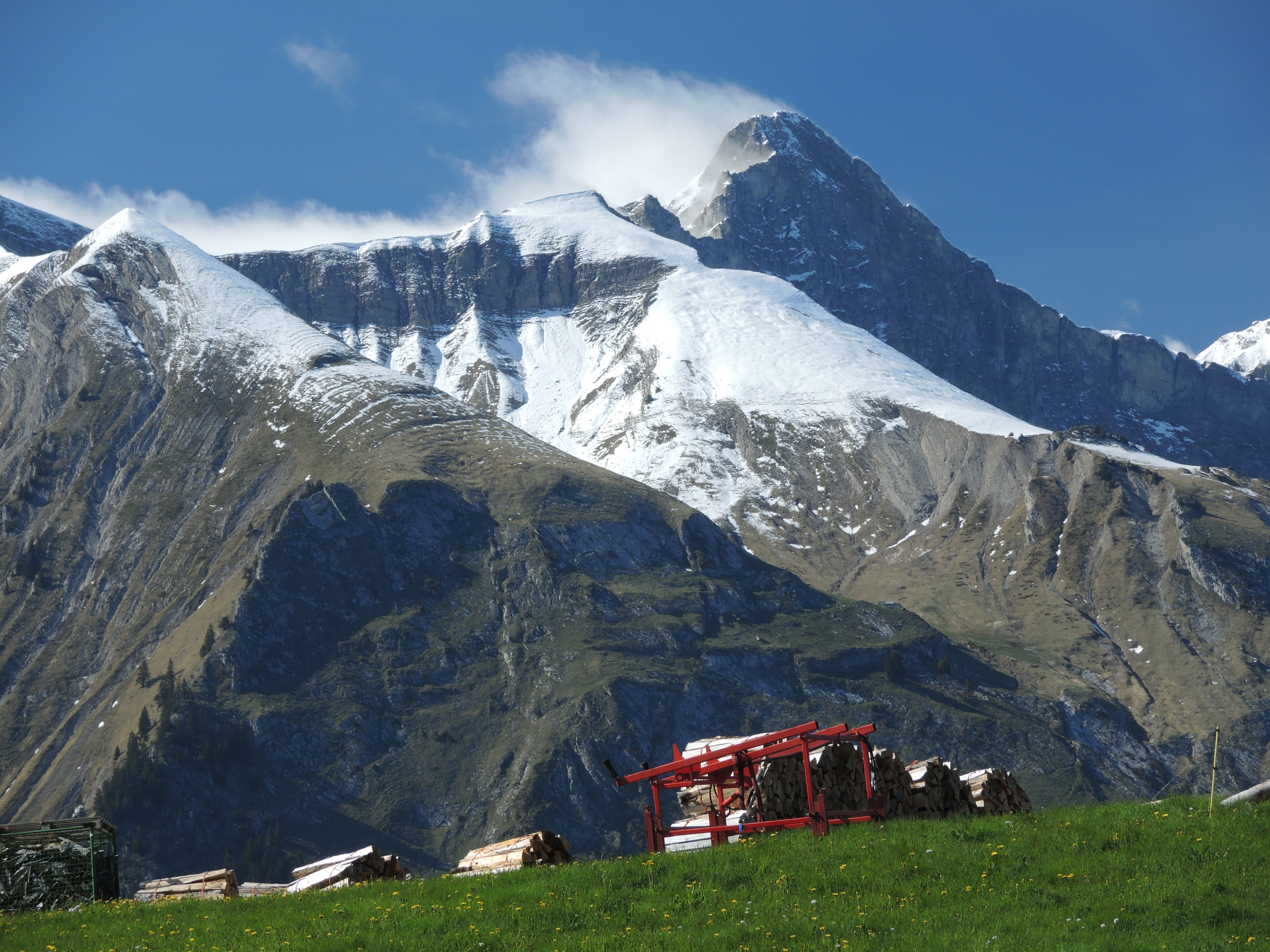
- View from the south

Highest point
- Elevation: 2,375 m (7,792 ft)
- Prominence: 140 m (460 ft)
- Parent peak: Vanil Noir
- Coordinates: 46°30′48″N 07°08′13″E

Geography
- Location within Switzerland
- Location: Fribourg/Vaud, Switzerland
- Parent range: Swiss Prealps

The Pointe de Paray is a mountain of the Swiss Prealps, located on the border between the cantons of Fribourg and Vaud. It has a height of 2,375 metres above sea level, making it both the third highest summit of the Vanil Noir massif and the canton of Fribourg. The mountain lies approximately halfway between the Vanil de l'Ecri and the Gros Perré.

The closest localities are Grandvillard (Fribourg) and Château d'Oex (Vaud).
