= Vanil Noir =

Mountain in Switzerland

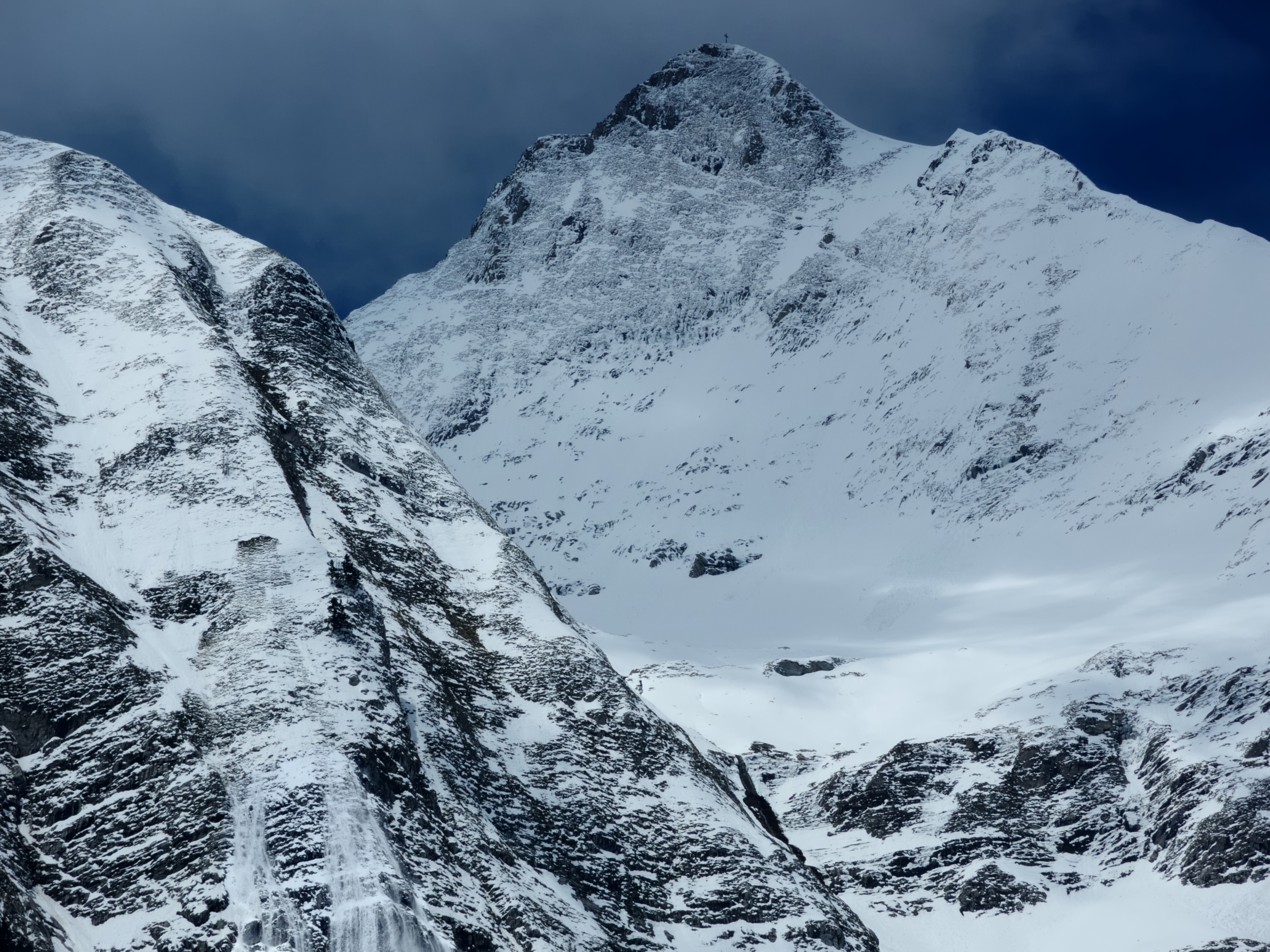
- The south side

Highest point
- Elevation: 2,389 m (7,838 ft)
- Prominence: 1,110 m (3,640 ft)
- Parent peak: Mont Blanc
- Isolation: 10.4 km (6.5 mi)
- Listing: Canton high point
- Coordinates: 46°31′42.5″N 7°8′54.1″E

Geography
- Location within Switzerland
- Location: Canton of Fribourg/Vaud, Switzerland
- Parent range: Fribourg Alps

Geology
- Mountain type: Limestone

The Vanil Noir (French: [vanil nwaʁ]; local Arpitan: Vani Né [vaˈni ˈne]) is a mountain of the Fribourg Prealps, located on the border between the cantons of Fribourg and Vaud in western Switzerland. Reaching a height of 2,389 metres above sea level, the Vanil Noir is the highest summit of the canton of Fribourg and of the Alpine foothills lying north of the Saane and Simme (or northwest of the Saanenmöser Pass). It is also the northernmost point in the canton of Vaud above 2,300 metres and the most prominent summit of both cantons.

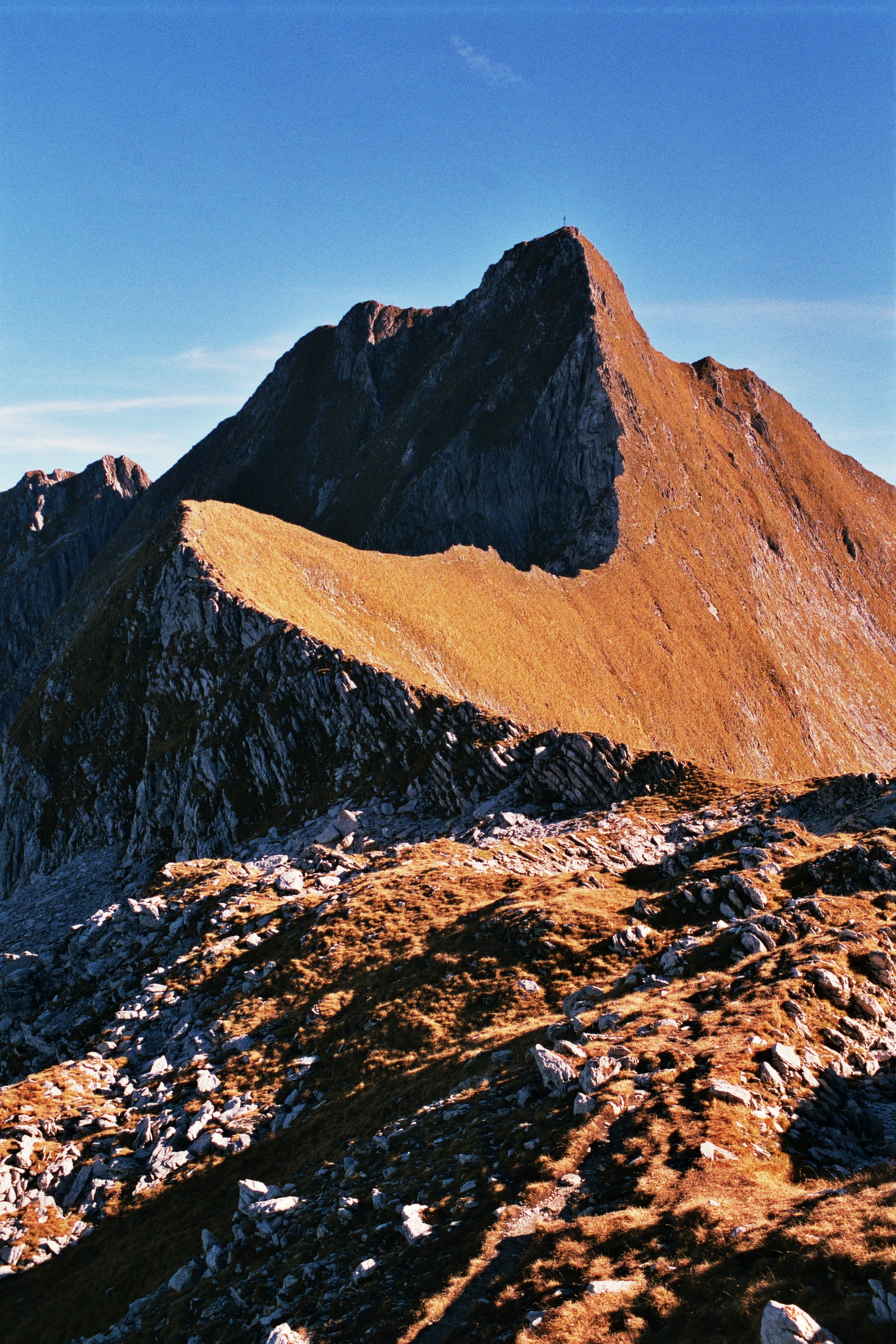
The southwest side

The Vanil Noir is the culminating point of the range separating the regions of Gruyère and Pays-d'Enhaut, although it is followed by the almost equally high Vanil de l'Ecri and Pointe de Paray. With these two mountains, it forms a large cirque on the south and east side, overlooking the alp of Paray Doréna. On the west side, it consists of a smaller cirque, overlooking the alp of Bounavau. On the northeast side it overlooks the valley of Les Morteys. All three valleys descending from the Vanil Noir are part of the Saane drainage basin.

The closest localities are Grandvillard (Fribourg) and Château d'Oex (Vaud). Several vertiginous trails lead to the summit, and cross it from north to south. The Vanil Noir is part of a nature reserve since 1983.

== See also ==
- List of mountains of Switzerland
- List of mountains of Vaud
- List of most isolated mountains of Switzerland
