= Canton of Fribourg =

Canton of Switzerland

Canton of Fribourg Canton de Fribourg (French) Kanton Freiburg (German) Canton of Freiburg
- Canton
- Flag Coat of arms Brandmark
- Interactive map of Canton of Fribourg
- Coordinates: 46°43′N 7°5′E
- Capital: Fribourg/Freiburg
- Subdivisions: 119 municipalities, 7 districts

Government
  - President: Jean-Pierre Siggen
  - Executive: Conseil d'Etat/Staatsrat (7)
  - Legislative: Grand Council of Fribourg (130)

Area
  - Total: 1,671.42 km^{2} (645.34 sq mi)

Population (December 2020)
  - Total: 325,496
  - Density: 194.742/km^{2} (504.380/sq mi)

GDP
  - Total: CHF 19.180 billion (2020)
  - Per capita: CHF 59,263 (2020)
- ISO 3166 code: CH-FR
- Highest point: 2,389 m (7,838 ft): Vanil Noir
- Lowest point: 429 m (1,407 ft): shore Lake Neuchâtel
- Joined: 1481
- Languages: French, German
- Website: www.fr.ch

The canton of Fribourg, (Note: French: Canton de Fribourg [kɑ̃tɔ̃ d(ə) fʁibuʁ]; Arpitan: Quenton de Fribôrg [cɛ̃ˈtɔ̃ də fʁiˈbwa]; Romansh: Chantun Friburg; Italian: Canton Friburgo.) also canton of Freiburg, (Note: German: Kanton Freiburg [ˈkantɔn ˈfraɪbʊrɡ]; Swiss German: Kanton Frybùrg.) is located in western Switzerland. The canton is bilingual, with French spoken by more than two thirds of the citizens and German by a little more than a quarter. Both are official languages in the canton. The canton takes its name from its capital city of Fribourg.

== History ==
On the shores of Lake Neuchâtel and Lake Morat significant traces of prehistoric settlements have been unearthed.

The canton of Fribourg joined the Swiss Confederation in 1481. The area is made up of lands acquired by the capital Fribourg. The present extent was reached in 1803 when Murten (Morat) was acquired. The canton of Fribourg joined the separatist league of Catholic cantons in 1846 (Sonderbund). The following year, its troops surrendered to the federal army.

== Geography ==
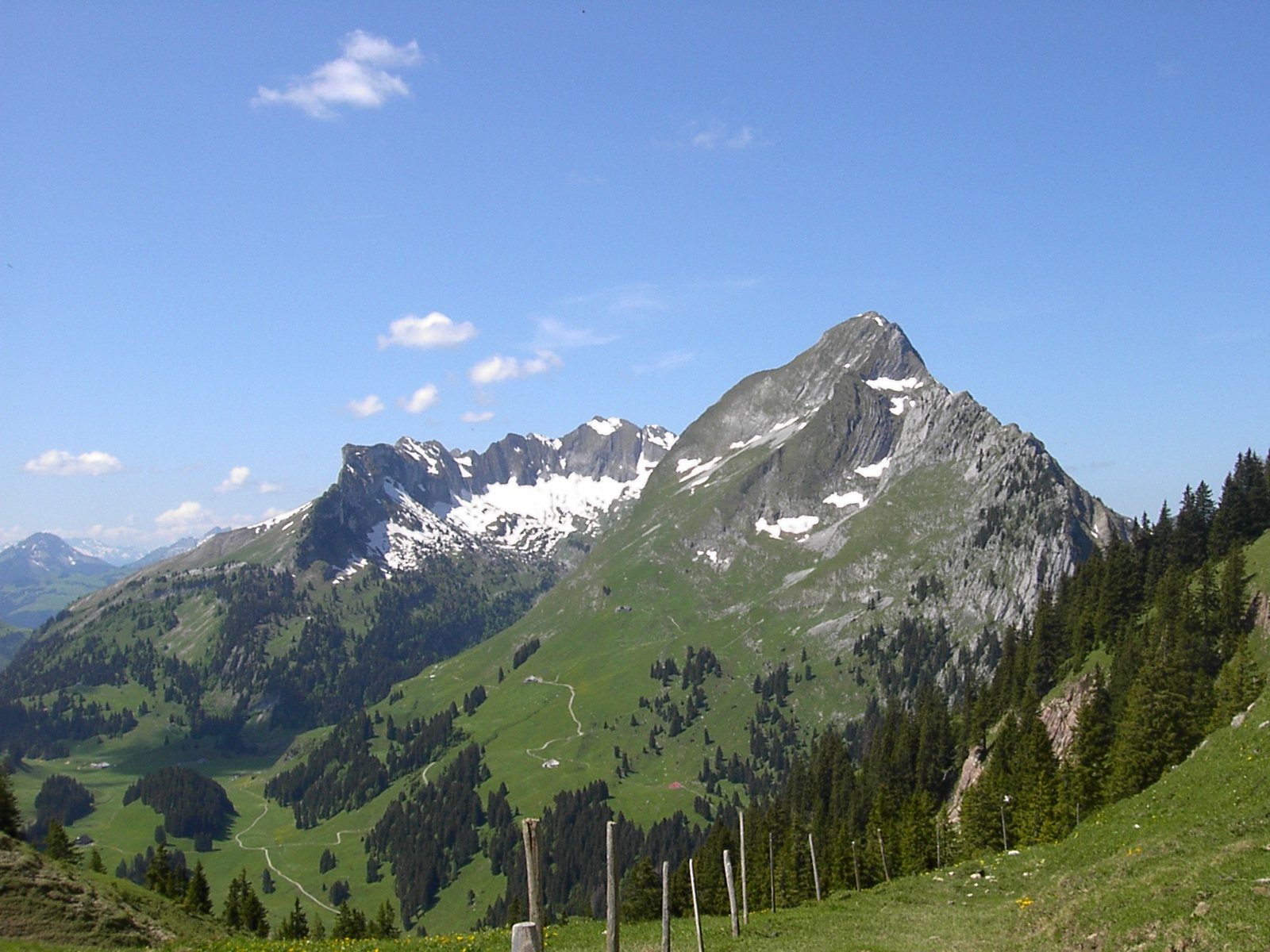
Fribourg Prealps: Dent de Brenleire (2358 m, to the right) and Vanil Noir (2389 m, in the background)

The canton is bounded to the west by Lake Neuchâtel, to the west and the south by the canton of Vaud, and to the east by the canton of Bern. The canton includes two enclaves within Vaud and one within the canton of Bern, as well as a large exclave on the lake; it also enclaves the Bernese municipality of Münchenwiler. The area of the canton is 1,669 square kilometers (644.4 sq mi), including the small enclaves.

The canton lies on the elevated Swiss Plateau. In the west the lands are flat, but towards the south east of the canton, the lands rise to a hilly region. This region is commonly called pre-Alps but is part of the Bernese Alps. The highest elevation in the canton is the Vanil Noir with 2,389 m (7,838 ft).

The river Saane/Sarine flows from the south to the north of the canton. Together with its tributaries it drains most of the lands in the canton, then joins the river Aare. The river Broye drains the west of the canton and flows northeast into Lake Morat (Murtensee). The southwest part of the canton is drained by the river Veveyse, which flows south into Lake Geneva (French: Le Léman).

== Political subdivisions ==
=== Districts ===
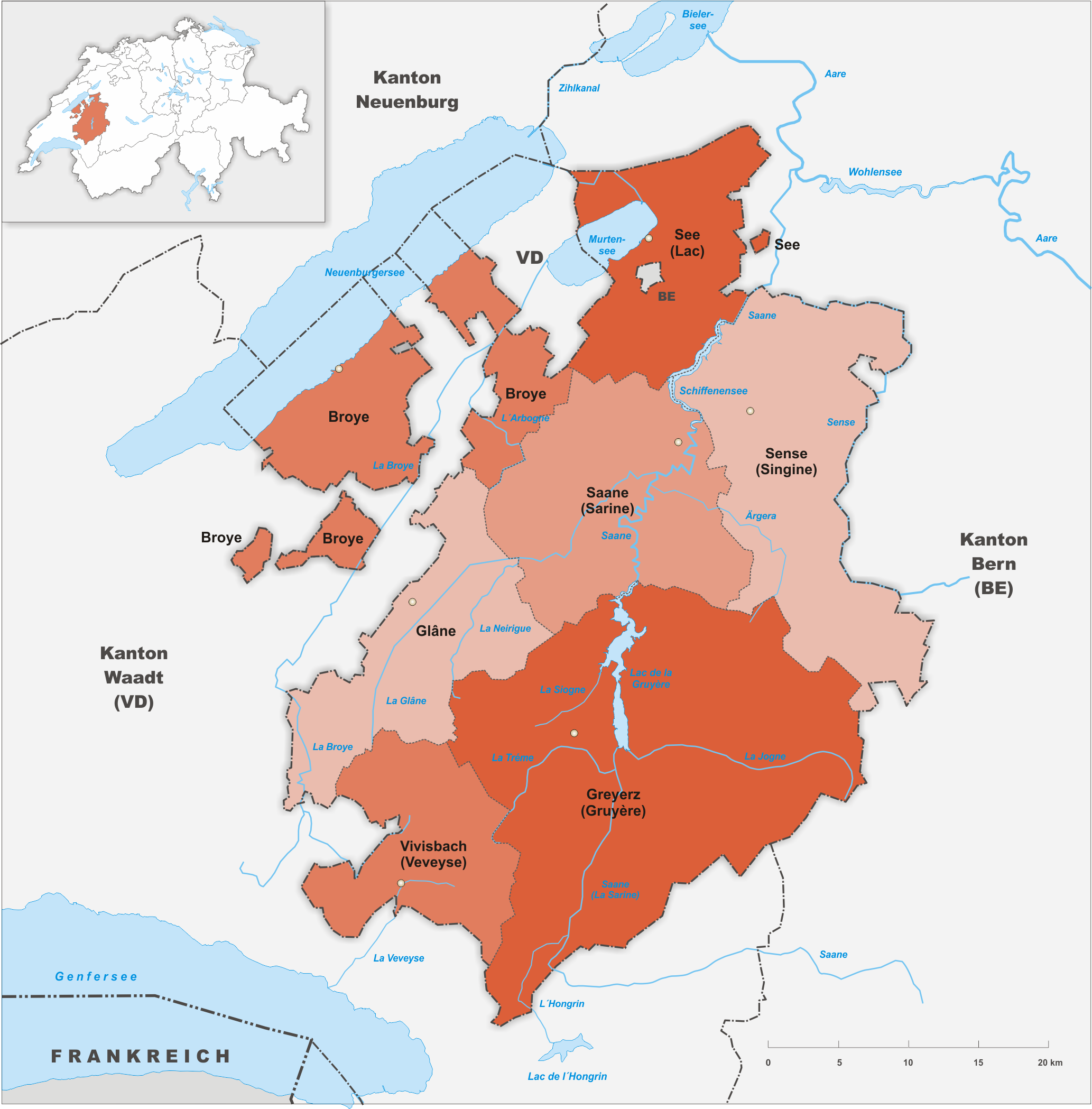
Districts of canton Fribourg

The Canton is divided into seven districts:

- Broye capital Estavayer-le-Lac
- Glâne capital Romont
- Gruyère (German: Greyerz) capital Bulle
- Sarine (German: Saane) capital Fribourg
- Lake (French: Lac, German: See) capital Morat
- Sense (French: Singine) capital Tafers
- Veveyse (German: Vivisbach) capital Châtel-Saint-Denis

=== Municipalities ===
There are 119 municipalities in the canton of Fribourg as of January 2026. The number is decreasing as the canton subsidizes mergers between municipalities.

== Demographics ==
In contrast to the mainly Protestant cantons of Vaud to its west and Bern to its east, the canton of Fribourg is a predominantly Catholic enclave (as of 2000, 70%) with a Protestant minority (15%). This explains why the canton straddles the French-German linguistic border, for in the past, denominational considerations were more important than linguistic when drawing Switzerland's cantonal borders.

The main centres of population are the capital Fribourg (34,300 inhabitants) and Bulle (18,200 inhabitants).

Two thirds of the population speak French; the remainder speak Alemannic dialects of German. The French-speaking areas are in the west of the canton, the Alemannic-speaking areas in the east. The number of bilingual towns, and consequently the large number of people who can speak both French and German fluently, has attracted businesses such as telesales companies. The population of the canton (as of 31 December 2020) is 325,496. As of 2007, the population included 43,838 foreign-born residents, or about 16.65% of the total population.

=== Historical population ===
The canton’s historical population is given in the following table:

Historic Population Data
Year	Total Population	Swiss	Non-Swiss	Population share of total country
1850	99 891	98 556	1 335	4.2%
1870	114 994	113 219	1 775	4.1%
1900	127,951	123,579	4,372	3.9%
1950	158,695	154,527	4,168	3.4%
1970	180,309	163,503	16,806	2.9%
2000	241,706	206,182	35,524	3.3%
2020	325,496			3.8%

== Economics ==
Agriculture is important in the canton of Fribourg. The main agricultural activities are cattle breeding and dairy farming. The region is a major cheese producer, especially the district of Gruyère, home of the cheese of the same name. The chocolate industry is also well established in Broc, home to an international chocolate research centre. Other agricultural produces include tobacco, fruit and cereals. Agriculture is predominant in the north of the canton where the most fertile lands lie.

There is light industry concentrated around the capital Fribourg. Other centres of light industry are Bulle, Villars-sur-Glâne, Düdingen (Guin), Murten (Morat) and Estavayer-le-Lac. These five centers have also a large number of established small and medium-sized businesses, many of which are in the service sector. Forests are important in the La Gruyère (Greyerz) district.

Power plants in the district of Sarine export electricity. The mountain areas attract tourists all year round. The lake regions are frequented by tourists in summer and autumn.

== Transport ==
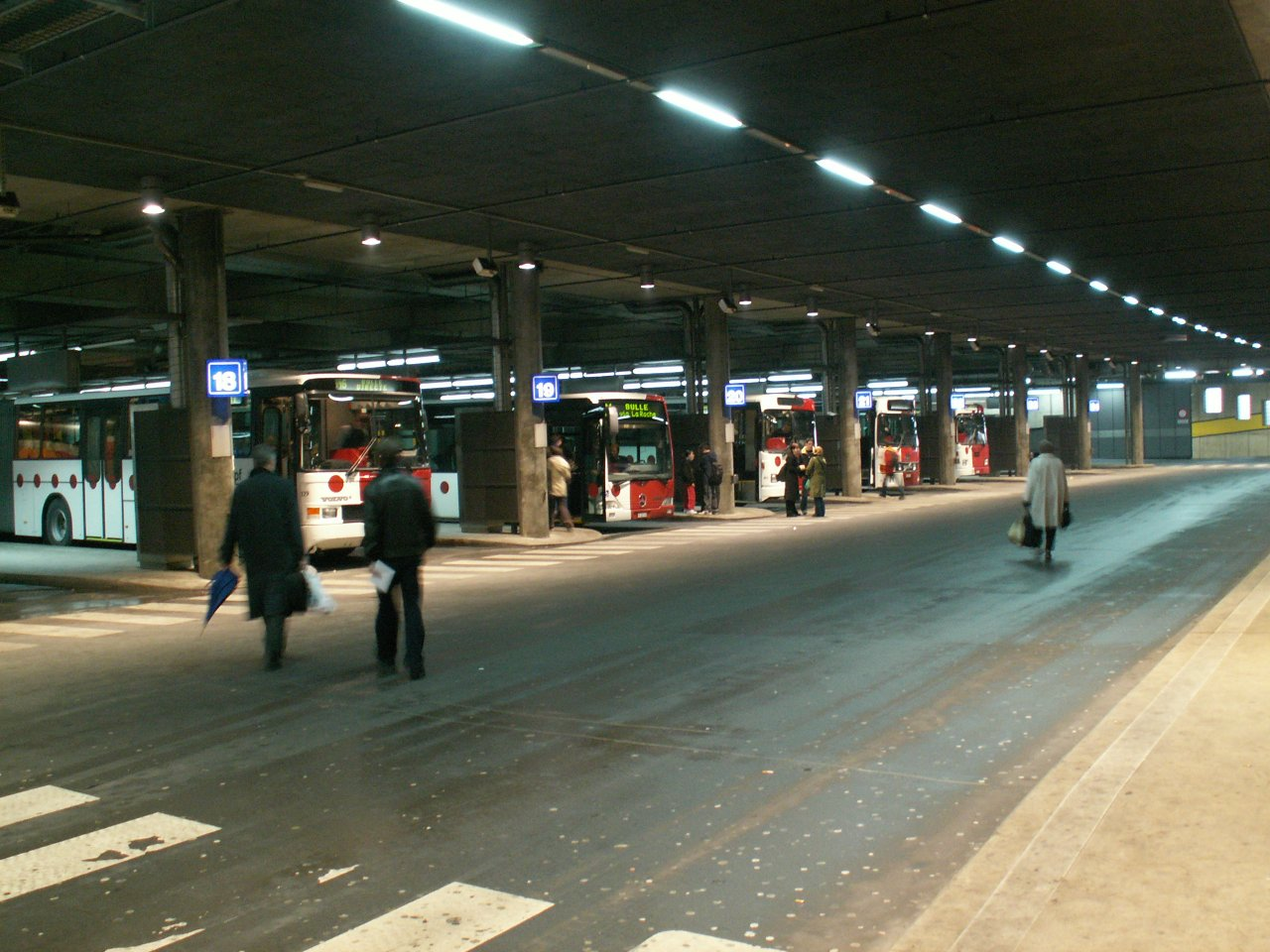
Transports publics Fribourgeois bus station in Fribourg

The canton of Fribourg is well connected to other areas of Switzerland with motorways A1, A12 and fast rail links. The main railway between Geneva and Lausanne in the south west to Bern and Zürich connects Fribourg with other centres of the country. Connections within the canton are mostly provided by the Transports Publics Fribourgeois, with numerous bus routes and trains connecting the main towns. The nearest airports to the canton are Geneva Airport, and Bern Airport.

== Politics ==
=== Federal election results ===
Percentage of the total vote per party in the canton in the Federal Elections 1971–2019
Party	Ideology	1971	1975	1979	1983	1987	1991	1995	1999	2003	2007	2011	2015	2019
FDP.The Liberals^{a}	Classical liberalism	24.7	22.1	23.0	20.0	16.7	16.1	15.9	14.8	12.8	13.8	12.8	14.2	14.4
CVP/PDC/PPD/PCD	Christian democracy	41.5	46.9	39.9	38.0	37.7	36.8	36.0	33.7	25.4	24.8	20.3	22.7	14.4
SP/PS	Social democracy	19.9	25.7	30.7	24.0	22.2	18.6	17.3	20.3	21.5	22.7	26.7	24.2	17.4
SVP/UDC	Swiss nationalism	8.7	4.3	6.4	8.8	8.9	9.7	8.3	11.4	21.4	22.0	21.4	25.9	19.2
EVP/PEV	Christian democracy	*^{b}	*	*	*	*	*	*	*	0.7	0.8	0.7	0.7	0.7
CSP/PCS	Christian socialism	5.3	*	*	7.5	6.9	7.7	8.7	10.9	10.4	7.1	5.5	1.8	3.3
GLP/PVL	Green liberalism	*	*	*	*	*	*	*	*	*	*	3.5	3.2	3.8
BDP/PBD	Conservatism	*	*	*	*	*	*	*	*	*	*	1.9	1.3	0.7
PdA/PST-POP/PC/PSL	Socialism	*	*	*	*	*	*	0.9	*	*	*	*	*	*
GPS/PES	Green politics	*	*	*	*	4.2	^{c}	2.3	*	4.0	6.3	5.0	5.3	12.5
FGA	Feminist	*	*	*	*	1.7	^{c}	*	*	*	*	*	*	*
SD/DS	National conservatism	*	*	*	*	*	1.4	0.9	0.3	*	*	*	*	*
EDU/UDF	Christian right	*	*	*	*	*	*	*	*	0.7	0.9	0.7	0.8	0.7
Other		*	1.0	*	1.7	1.9	9.6	9.7	8.6	3.1	1.6	1.5	*	12.9
Voter participation %		53.5	47.7	48.6	52.9	46.3	45.0	39.5	41.2	45.4	48.0	47.2	47.2	43.0

^a FDP before 2009, FDP.The Liberals after 2009
^b "*" indicates that the party was not on the ballot in this canton.
^c Included under "Other" in this election.

== See also ==
- List of castles and fortresses in Switzerland
- Franco-Provençal language
- Fribourg State Archives
- Romont Glass Museum
