= Preamble to the Constitution (disambiguation) =

Preamble to the Constitution may refer to:

- Preamble to the United States Constitution
- Preamble to the Constitution of India
- Preamble to the Constitution Act, 1867
- Preamble and Title 1 of the Swiss Federal Constitution
- Preamble to the Constitution of Georgia (U.S. state)
- Preamble to the Albanian Constitution
- Preamble to the Constitution of the People's Socialist Republic of Albania
- Preamble to the 1997 Constitution of Fiji

== See also ==
- Preamble
