= Secular state =

State or country without a state religion

States with no state religion States with state religion Ambiguous states or no data

A secular state is an idea pertaining to secularity, whereby a state is or purports to be officially neutral in matters of religion, supporting neither religion nor irreligion. A secular state claims to treat all its citizens equally regardless of religion, and claims to avoid preferential treatment for a citizen based on their religious beliefs, affiliation or lack of either over those with other profiles.

Although secular states have no state religion, the absence of an established state religion does not mean that a state is completely secular or egalitarian. For example, some states that describe themselves as secular have religious references in their national anthems and flags, laws that benefit one religion or another, or are members of the Organisation of Islamic Cooperation and of the International Religious Freedom or Belief Alliance.

== Origin and practice ==
Secularity can be established at a state's creation (e.g., the Soviet Union, the United States) or by it later secularizing (e.g., France or Nepal). Movements for laïcité in France and separation of church and state in the United States have defined modern concepts of secularism, the United States of America being the first explicitly secular government in history. Historically, the process of secularisation typically involves granting religious freedom, disestablishing state religions, stopping public funds being used for religion, freeing the legal system from religious control, freeing up the education system, tolerating citizens who change religion or abstain from religion, and allowing political leaders to come to power regardless of their religious beliefs.

In France, Italy, and Spain, for example, official holidays for the public administration tend to be Christian feast days. Any private school in France that contracts with Éducation nationale means its teachers are salaried by the state—most of the Catholic schools are in this situation and, because of history, they are the majority; however, any other religious or non-religious schools also contract this way. In some European states where secularism confronts monoculturalist philanthropy, some of the main Christian denominations and sects of other religions depend on the state for some of the financial resources for their religious charities. It is common in corporate law and charity law to prohibit organized religion from using those funds to organize religious worship in a separate place of worship or for conversion; the religious body itself must provide the religious content, educated clergy and laypersons to exercise its own functions and may choose to devote part of their time to the separate charities. To that effect, some of those charities establish secular organizations that manage part of or all of the donations from the main religious bodies.

Many states that are nowadays secular in practice may have legal vestiges of an earlier established religion. Secularism also has various guises that may coincide with some degree of official religiosity. In the United Kingdom, the head of state is still required to take the Coronation Oath enacted in 1688, swearing to maintain the Protestant Reformed religion and to preserve the established Church of England. The UK also maintains seats in the House of Lords for 26 senior clergymen of the Church of England, known as the Lords Spiritual. In Canada the Canadian Charter of Rights and Freedoms affords secular freedoms of conscience and religion, thought, belief, opinion and expression, including communication, assembly and association yet the Charter's preamble maintains the concept of "the supremacy of God" which would appear to disadvantage those who hold nontheistic or polytheistic beliefs, including Atheism and Buddhism. Italy has been a secular state since the enactment of the Constitution in 1948 (stressed by a Constitutional court's decision in 1989), but still recognizes a special status for the Catholic Church. The reverse progression can also occur, however; a state can go from being secular to being a religious state, as in the case of Iran where the secularized Imperial State of Iran was replaced by an Islamic Republic. Nonetheless, the last 250 years has seen a trend towards secularism.

== List of secular states by continent ==
This is the list of countries that are explicitly described as secular in their constitutions or other official state documents.

=== Africa ===
- Angola
- Benin
- Botswana
- Burkina Faso
- Burundi
- Cameroon
- Central African Republic
- Chad
- Comoros
- Congo DR
- Congo
- Equatorial Guinea
- Eritrea
- Eswatini
- Ethiopia
- Gabon
- Gambia
- Ghana
- Guinea
- Guinea-Bissau
- Ivory Coast
- Kenya
- Lesotho
- Liberia
- Madagascar
- Malawi
- Mali
- Mozambique
- Namibia
- Niger
- Nigeria
- Rwanda
- São Tomé and Príncipe
- Senegal
- Sierra Leone
- South Africa
- South Sudan
- Sudan
- Tanzania
- Togo
- Tunisia
- Uganda
- Zimbabwe

=== Americas ===
- Antigua and Barbuda
- Argentina
- (The Bahamas) Bahamas
- Barbados
- Belize
- Bolivia
- Brazil
- Canada
- Chile
- Colombia
- Cuba
- Dominica
- Dominican Republic
- Ecuador
- El Salvador
- Grenada
- Guatemala
- Guyana
- Haiti
- Honduras
- Jamaica
- Mexico
- Nicaragua
- Paraguay
- Panama
- Peru
- Saint Kitts and Nevis
- Saint Lucia
- Saint Vincent and the Grenadines
- Suriname
- Trinidad and Tobago
- United States
- Uruguay
- Venezuela

=== Asia ===
- China (Marxist–Leninist atheist state)
- Cyprus
- Indonesia
- India
- Japan
- Kyrgyzstan
- Laos
- Mongolia
- Nepal
- Northern Cyprus (Note: State with limited recognition.)
- North Korea (Juche state)
- Philippines
- Singapore
- South Korea
- Syria
- Taiwan
- Tajikistan
- Timor-Leste
- Turkmenistan
- Uzbekistan
- Vietnam (Marxist–Leninist atheist state)

=== Europe ===
- Albania
- Andorra
- Austria
- Belarus
- Belgium
- Bosnia and Herzegovina
- Bulgaria
- Croatia
- Czech Republic
- Estonia
- Finland
- France
- Germany
- Hungary
- Ireland
- Italy
- Kosovo
- Latvia
- Lithuania
- Luxembourg
- Moldova
- Netherlands
- Norway
- Poland
- Portugal
- Romania
- Serbia
- Slovakia
- Slovenia
- Spain
- Sweden
- Switzerland
- Ukraine

=== Oceania ===
- Australia (Note: Section 116 of the Constitution of Australia provides, "the Commonwealth shall not make any law for establishing any religion, or for imposing any religious observance, or for prohibiting the free exercise of any religion, and no religious test shall be required as a qualification for any office or public trust under the Commonwealth. However, the states retain the power to pass religiously discriminatory laws.)
- Fiji
- Kiribati
- Marshall Islands
- Micronesia
- Nauru
- New Zealand
- Palau
- Vanuatu

=== Transcontinental countries ===
- Armenia
- Azerbaijan
- Georgia
- Kazakhstan
- Russia
- Turkey (Note: "Secularism in Turkey" is disputed by some scholars.)

== Formerly secular states ==
- Bangladesh (1972–1977)
  - Bangladesh was founded as a secular state by Sheikh Mujibur Rahman following the Liberation War. In 1977, secularism was removed from the constitution by a martial law directive during the Ziaur Rahman government. In 1988, the Parliament of Bangladesh declared Islam as the state religion during the presidency of Hussain Muhammad Ershad. In 2010, the Bangladesh Supreme Court ruled that the removal of secularism in 1977 was illegal because it was done by an unconstitutional martial law regime. The current Constitution of Bangladesh declares Islam as the state religion, but also accepts the secularism as one of the fundamental principles of state policy.
- Democratic Republic of Afghanistan (1978–1987)
  - Afghanistan officially became a secular state following the Saur Revolution, though unofficially operated as a Marxist–Leninist atheist state. However, Sunni Islam was briefly reinstated as the state religion under General Secretary Hafizullah Amin until his assassination in December 1979. President Mohammad Najibullah would reinstate Sunni Islam as the state religion in 1987.
- People's Republic of Kampuchea (1979–1993)
  - Kampuchea was a secular state from 1979 until the restoration of its monarchy in 1993.
- Djibouti (1977–2010)
  - Djibouti became a secular state after gaining independence from France in 1977. Islam was installed as the state religion in 2010.
- Imperial State of Iran (1925–1979)
  - Iran became a de facto secular state following the 1921 Persian coup d'état with the establishment of the Pahlavi dynasty as the ruling house of the country in 1925, until the Islamic Revolution in 1979.
- Iraq (1958–1993)
  - Iraq became a secular state in 1958 after overthrowing the monarchy. However, the Ba'athist Government led by Saddam Hussein launched the Faith Campaign in 1993 and placed significant emphasis on Islam within all sectors of state and public life.
- Burma (currently Myanmar) (1885–1961; 1962–2008)
  - Myanmar was a secular state during the colonial period and post-independence period until 1961 and again under the socialist regime, and the military regime until 2008.
- Samoa (1962–2017)
  - The Samoan legislative assembly approved a constitutional amendment in 2017 that instituted Christianity as the state religion.
- Papua New Guinea (1975–2025)
  - Parliament voted to amend the Constitution of Papua New Guinea to include in its preamble the words "[We] acknowledge and declare God, the Father; Jesus Christ, the Son; and Holy Spirit, as our Creator and Sustainer of the entire universe and the source of our powers and authorities, delegated to the people and all persons within the geographical jurisdiction of Papua New Guinea."

== Ambiguous countries ==
- Bangladesh
  - There is constitutional ambiguity whether Bangladesh is a secular country or an Islamic country. In 2010, the high court of Bangladesh reinstated secularism as a part of the Bangladesh constitution after terming the 1977 constitutional amendment done by then Bangladesh President Ziaur Rahman as illegal. Political leaders and experts have expressed uncertainty if Bangladesh is a secular state or an Islamic state. Bangladesh regime changes often advocate for different type of religious freedom as in secularism or pluralism.
- Israel
  - Since the Proclamation of Israeli independence in 1948, Israel is defined in several of its laws as a "Jewish and democratic state" (Hebrew: מדינה יהודית ודמוקרטית, romanized: medina yehudit ve-demokratit). However, the term "Jewish" is a polyseme that can describe the Jewish people as either an ethnic or a religious group. The debate about the meaning of the term "Jewish" and its legal and social applications is one of the most profound issues with which Israeli society deals. The problem of the status of religion in Israel, even though it is relevant to all religions, usually refers to the status of Judaism in Israeli society. Thus, even though from a constitutional point of view Judaism is not the state religion in Israel, its status nevertheless determines relations between religion and state and the extent to which religion influences the political center.
- Malaysia
  - In Article 3 of the Constitution of Malaysia, Islam is stated as the official religion of the country: "Islam is the religion of the Federation; but other religions may be practiced in peace and harmony in any part of the Federation." In 1956, the Alliance party submitted a memorandum to the Reid Commission, which was responsible for drafting the Malayan constitution. The memorandum quoted: "The religion of Malaya shall be Islam. The observance of this principle shall not impose any disability on non-Muslim nationals professing and practicing their own religion and shall not imply that the state is not a secular state." The full text of the Memorandum was inserted into paragraph 169 of the Commission Report. This suggestion was later carried forward in the Federation of Malaya Constitutional Proposals 1957 (White Paper), specifically quoted in paragraph 57: "There has been included in the proposed Federal Constitution a declaration that Islam is the religion of the Federation. This will in no way affect the present position of the Federation as a secular State...." The Cobbold Commission also made another similar quote in 1962: "....we are agreed that Islam should be the national religion for the Federation. We are satisfied that the proposal in no way jeopardises freedom of religion in the Federation, which in effect would be secular." In December 1987, the Lord President of the Supreme Court, Salleh Abas described Malaysia as governed by "secular law" in a court ruling.

== See also ==
- Civil religion
- Freedom of religion
- Secular education
- Secularism
- Secularity
- Secular religion
- Separation of church and state
- State atheism
- State religion
- Theocracy
- Religious law

== Bibliography ==
- Dodd, Jan (2003). The rough guide to Vietnam (7th ed.). London: Rough Guides. ISBN 9781405389730. OCLC 762991000.
- Temperman, Jeroen, State Religion Relationships and Human Rights Law: Towards a Right to Religiously Neutral Governance, BRILL, 2010, ISBN 9004181482
