= Constitutional references to God =

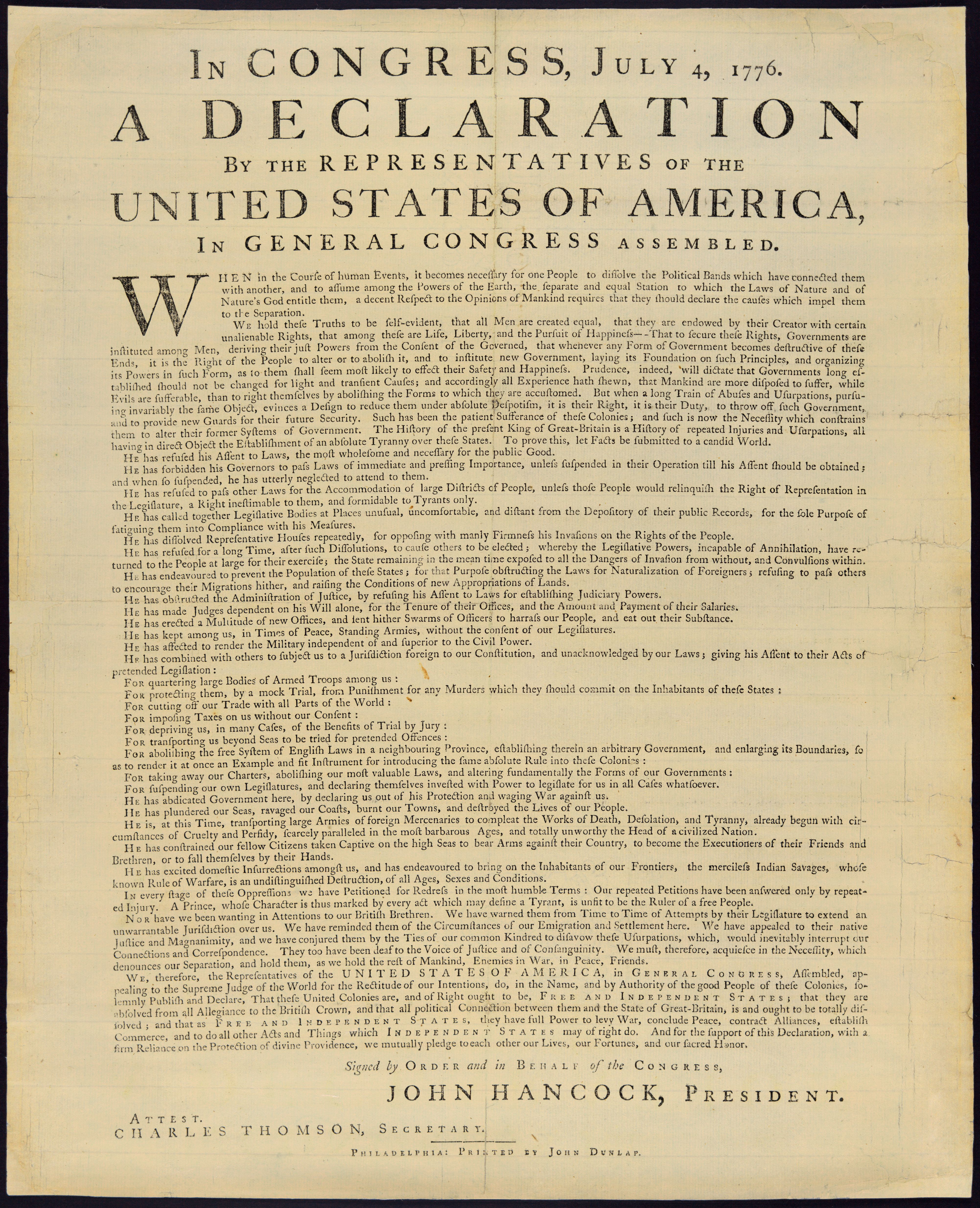
Although the US Declaration of Independence originally of July 4, 1776, features multiple references to God, the US federal constitution makes no explicit mention of God.

Constitutional references to God exist in the constitutions of a number of nations, most often in the preamble. A reference to God in a legal text is called invocatio dei ('invocation of God') if the text itself is proclaimed in the name of the deity. A reference to God in another context is called nominatio dei ('naming of God'). Such invocationes and nominationes dei are found notably in several European constitutional traditions (reflecting the strong position of established churches in those countries and the tradition of invoking God in legal documents) and in the constitutions of Islamic countries.

== History ==
Invocationes dei have a long tradition in European legal history outside national constitutions. In ancient times and the Middle Ages, gods or God were normally invoked in contracts to guarantee the agreements made, and formulas such as "In the name of God the Father, the Son and the Holy Spirit" were used at the beginning of legal documents to emphasize the fairness and justness of the created norms. Treaties between Christian nations customarily began with an invocation of God until the late 19th century.

When written constitutions became the norm for modern states in the 19th century, several European states carried this tradition over to their founding documents and then retained it, while others – notably laicist France and states influenced by it – did not do so, so as to preserve the state's religious neutrality. Some European countries whose constitutions do not make reference to God include Norway (1814), Luxembourg (1868/1972), Iceland (1944/68), Italy (1947), Portugal (1976) and Spain (1978). In the United States, the federal constitution does not make a reference to God as such, although it uses the formula "the year of our Lord" in Article VII. At the state level, the constitutions of the states of California, Colorado, Florida, Georgia, Illinois, Iowa, Kansas, Kentucky, Louisiana, Maine, Massachusetts, Michigan, Minnesota, New Jersey, New Mexico, Nevada, Pennsylvania, Texas, Wisconsin, and Washington, and the U.S. territory Puerto Rico, make a reference to God. They generally use an invocatio of "God the Almighty" or the "Supreme Ruler of the Universe".

When the newly independent nations of Eastern Europe and Asia adopted new democratic constitutions in the early 1990s following the fall of the Soviet Union and the end of the Eastern Bloc, they took a variety of approaches to the issue of mentioning God:

- The great majority of the new constitutions, including those of all ex-Soviet republics and dependent states except Hungary, Poland and Ukraine, make no mention of the supernatural in the preamble (Belarus, Bosnia and Herzegovina, Bulgaria, Estonia, Lithuania, Russia, Slovenia, Serbia and Montenegro), including those rooted in a Muslim background (Kazakhstan, Kyrgyzstan, Tajikistan, Turkmenistan and Uzbekistan), or have no preamble at all (Romania, Latvia, Albania, Armenia and Azerbaijan). Instead, they make reference to secular values such as "liberty, justice and law” (Estonia) or "the generally accepted principles in the modern world" (Croatia). The 2020 amendments to the Constitution of Russia added a reference to belief in God.
- The preambles to the Constitution of the Czech Republic and of Slovakia do not mention God directly, but refer to the country's "spiritual wealth" (Czech Republic) or to "the spiritual heritage of Cyril and Methodius" (Slovakia).
- Poland's and Ukraine's constitutional preambles contain a nominatio dei (see the list below).

Most recently, the inclusion of a nominatio dei was hotly debated in the preparation of the preamble to the proposed European Constitution. The governments of the member states eventually failed to reach consensus for a reference to Christianity. (See: History of the European Constitution.)

== Functions ==
Invocationes and nominationes dei in constitutions are attributed a number of purposes:

- Legitimizing the state: An invocation of God can have the purpose of legitimizing governmental power by declaring it to be exercised according to the will of God rather than, or in addition to, the will of the people. Expressing the divine right of kings was a principal function of invocationes dei in early 19th century monarchic national constitutions, but is no longer an overt purpose of references to God in modern democratic constitutions.
- Expressing governmental support for a specific religion: Some authors have nonetheless expressed the view that the nominatio dei in the republican German constitution of 1949 represents the establishment of a specifically Christian state, a "theonomic summit" of the constitution that commits the state to active support of Christian teachings such as in public education. This view is rejected in German constitutional practice.
- Challenging the state through reference to suprapositive law and common values: References to a power transcending human authority are seen as a reference to the concept of suprapositive law – that is, norms above and beyond those made by humans ("positive law"), such as divine law or natural law. This is perceived as an acknowledgment of inherent limitations of human law and power, as expressed in Radbruch's formula concerning the relationship between law and justice, or as a rejection of legal positivism altogether. A commitment to inherent limitations of the power of the state over its subjects is also perceived as reflecting a shared commitment to shared values such as human dignity that a state must presuppose rather than establish. Understood in this sense, a reference to God challenges, rather than supports and legitimizes, secular authority.
- Anchoring the state in history and tradition: In countries with a long constitutional history and a heritage of shared religious faith, references to God in an otherwise secular constitution have been interpreted as serving a historical function by perpetuating the tradition of invocationes dei of older constitutions and by establishing the general conception of statehood (for instance, Western and Christian) underlying the constitution.

== Legal effect ==
The invocation of God and Jesus in the Preamble of the Constitution of Ireland has been cited in Supreme Court rulings. The concept of natural law has been used to elucidate unenumerated rights. In 1983, Chief Justice Tom O'Higgins, in rejecting David Norris' appeal against the criminalization of buggery in the Offences against the Person Act 1861, stated "It cannot be doubted that the people, so asserting and acknowledging their obligations to our Divine Lord Jesus Christ, were proclaiming a deep religious conviction and faith and an intention to adopt a Constitution consistent with that conviction and faith and with Christian beliefs." The report of the 1996 Constitutional Review Group recommended amending the preamble to a simple enactment in the name of the people, which would not be cognisable by the courts.

Conversely, in Canada the mention of God in the preamble to the Canadian Charter of Rights and Freedoms has not had much effect. In considering the legal implications of the preamble in the 1999 case R. v. Sharpe, the British Columbia Court of Appeal referred to it as a "dead letter" which the BC justices had "no authority to breathe life" into.

== List ==
Country	Enactment year	Type of reference	English text or translation	Original text (if not in English)	Notes
Algeria	1976	Invocatio	"In the Name of God the Merciful and the Compassionate"		
Antigua and Barbuda	1981	Nominatio	"WHEREAS the People of Antigua and Barbuda – 1. proclaim that they are a sovereign nation founded upon principles that acknowledge the supremacy of God, the dignity and worth of the human person, the entitlement of all persons to the fundamental rights and freedoms of the individual, the position of the family in a society of free men and women and free institutions; (...) NOW, THEREFORE, the following provisions shall have effect as the Constitution of Antigua and Barbuda:"	(Original text in English)	
Albania	1998	Nominatio	"We, the people of Albania, proud and aware of our history, with responsibility for the future, and with faith in God and/or other universal values, ... We establish this Constitution:"	"Ne, Populli i Shqipërisë, krenarë dhe të vetëdijshëm për historinë tonë, mepërgjegjësi për të ardhmen, me besim te Zoti dhe/ose te vlera të tjera universale, ... Vendosim këtë Kushtetutë:"	
Australia	1900	Nominatio	"Whereas the people of New South Wales, Victoria, South Australia, Queensland, and Tasmania, humbly relying on the blessing of Almighty God, have agreed to unite in one indissoluble Federal Commonwealth under the Crown ... Be it therefore enacted ... as follows:"	(Original text in English)	Western Australia is not mentioned even though it became one of the original states of the Commonwealth of Australia because at the time the Constitution Act was drafted it was not certain whether WA would join the Australian Commonwealth or not.
Argentina	1853	Nominatio	"We, the representatives of the people of the Argentine Nation, ... invoking the protection of God, source of all reason and justice: do ordain, decree, and establish this Constitution for the Argentine Nation."	(in Spanish) "Nos los representantes del pueblo de la Nación Argentina, ... invocando la protección de Dios, fuente de toda razón y justicia: ordenamos, decretamos y establecemos esta Constitución, para la Nación Argentina."	
Bahamas	1973	Nominatio	"Whereas Four hundred and eighty-one years ago the rediscovery of this Family of Islands, Rocks and Cays heralded the rebirth of the New World; And Whereas the People of this Family of Islands recognizing that the preservation of their Freedom will be guaranteed by a national commitment to Self-discipline, Industry, Loyalty, Unity and an abiding respect for Christian values and the Rule of Law; Now Know Ye Therefore: We the Inheritors of and Successors to this Family of Islands, recognizing the Supremacy of God and believing in the Fundamental Rights and Freedoms of the Individual, Do Hereby Proclaim in Solemn Praise the Establishment of a Free and Democratic Sovereign Nation founded on Spiritual Values and in which no Man, Woman or Child shall ever be Slave or Bondsman to anyone or their Labour exploited or their Lives frustrated by deprivation, and do Hereby Provide by these Articles for the indivisible Unity and Creation under God of the Commonwealth of The Bahamas."	(Original text in English)	
Bahrain	2002	Invocatio	"In the name of God on high, and with His blessing, and with His help, we Hamad bin Isa Al Khalifa, Sovereign of the Kingdom of Bahrain, in line with our determination, certainty, faith, and awareness of our national, pan-Arab and international responsibilities; and in acknowledgment of our obligations to God, our obligations to the homeland and the citizens, and our commitment to fundamental principles and our responsibility to Mankind, ... we have amended the existing Constitution"		
Bangladesh	1979	Preamble	"In the name of Allah, the Beneficent, the Merciful/In the name of Creator, the Merciful"	(in Bengali) "বিসমিল্লাহির-রাহমানির-রাহীম (দয়াময়, পরম দয়ালু, আল্লাহের নামে/পরম করুণাময় সৃষ্টিকর্তার নামে)"	
Brazil	1988	Nominatio	"We, the representatives of the Brazilian People, ... promulgate, under the protection of God, this CONSTITUTION OF THE FEDERATIVE REPUBLIC OF BRAZIL."	(in Portuguese) "Nós, representantes do povo brasileiro, ... promulgamos, sob a proteção de Deus, a seguinte CONSTITUIÇÃO DA REPÚBLICA FEDERATIVA DO BRASIL."	
Canada	1982	Nominatio	"Whereas Canada is founded upon principles that recognize the supremacy of God and the rule of law"	(Original text in English)	
Cook Islands	1965/1997	Invocatio	"IN THE HOLY NAME OF GOD, THE ALMIGHTY, THE EVERLOVING AND THE EVERLASTING We, the people of the Cook Islands, recognising the heritage of Christian principles, Cook Islands custom, and the rule of law, remember to keep holy the Sabbath Day, being that day of the week which, according to a person's belief and conscience, is the Sabbath of the Lord."	(Original text in English)	
Danish Realm	1953	Preamble	We Frederik the Ninth, by the Mercy of God King of Denmark...	Vi Frederik den Niende, af Guds Nåde Konge til Danmark...	
Ecuador	2008	Preamble, Invocatio	RECOGNIZING our ancient roots, forged by women and men of diverse peoples, CELEBRATING nature, Pachamama, of which we are a part and which is vital to our existence. INVOKING the name of God and recognizing our diverse forms of religiosity and spirituality, APPENING to the wisdom of all the cultures that enrich us as a society, as heirs to the social struggles for liberation against all forms of domination and colonialism, and with a profound commitment to the present and the future, We decide to build A new form of civic coexistence, in diversity and harmony with nature, to achieve good living, sumak kawsay. A society that respects, in all its dimensions, the dignity of individuals and communities; A democratic country, committed to Latin American integration—the dream of Bolívar and Alfaro—peace, and solidarity with all the peoples of the earth; And, In the exercise of our sovereignty, in Ciudad Alfaro, Montecristi, province of Manabí, we hereby issue the following: CONSTITUTION OF THE REPUBLIC OF ECUADOR	RECONOCIENDO nuestras raíces milenarias, forjadas por mujeres y hombres de distintos pueblos, CELEBRANDO a la naturaleza, la Pacha Mama, de la que nosotros somos parte y que es vital para nuestra existencia. INVOCANDO el nombre de Dios y reconociendo nuestras diversas formas de religiosidad y espiritualidad, APELANDO a la sabiduría de todas las culturas que nos enriquecen como sociedad, como herederos de las luchas sociales de liberación frente a todas las formas de dominación y colonialismo, y con profundo compromiso con el presente y el futuro, Decidimos construir Una nueva forma de convivencia ciudadana, en diversidad y armonía con la naturaleza, para alcanzar el buen vivir, el sumak kawsay Una sociedad que respeta, en todas sus dimensiones, la dignidad de las personas y las colectividades; Un país democrático, comprometido con la integración latinoamericana –sueño de Bolívar y Alfaro-, la paz y la solidaridad con todos los pueblos de la tierra; y, En ejercicio de nuestra soberanía, en Ciudad Alfaro, Montecristi, provincia de Manabí, nos damos la presente: CONSTITUCIÓN DE LA REPÚBLICA DEL ECUADOR"	
Fiji	1988	Nominatio	"WE, THE PEOPLE OF THE FIJI ISLANDS, seeking the blessing of God who has always watched over these islands: RECALLING the events in our history that have made us what we are, especially the settlement of these islands by the ancestors of the indigenous Fijian and Rotuman people; the arrival of forebears of subsequent settlers, including Pacific Islanders, Europeans, Indians and Chinese; the conversion of the indigenous inhabitants of these islands from heathenism to Christianity through the power of the name of Jesus Christ; the enduring influence of Christianity in these islands and its contribution, along with that of other faiths, to the spiritual life of Fiji: ... WITH GOD AS OUR WITNESS, GIVE OURSELVES THIS CONSTITUTION"	(Original text in English)	
Georgia	1995		"We, the citizens of Georgia – whose firm will it is to establish a democratic social order, economic freedom, and a legal and a social state; (...) proclaim this Constitution before God and the nation." (Preamble) "Along with freedom of belief and religion, the State shall recognise the outstanding role of the Apostolic Autocephalous Orthodox Church of Georgia in the history of Georgia, and its independence from the State.(...)" (Art. 8) "Prior to assuming office, on the third Sunday after the election day, the newly elected President of Georgia shall address the people and take the following oath of office: ‘I, the President of Georgia, do solemnly affirm before God and the nation that I will support and defend the Constitution of Georgia, the independence, unity and indivisibility of the country; that I will faithfully perform the duties of the President, will care for the security and welfare of the citizens of my country and for the revival and might of my nation and homeland.'" (Art. 51;1)	(in Georgian) "ჩვენ, საქართველოს მოქალაქენი, რომელთა ურყევი ნებაა, დავამკვიდროთ დემოკრატიული საზოგადოებრივი წესწყობილება, ეკონომიკური თავისუფლება, სოციალური და სამართლებრივი სახელმწიფო, (...) ღვთისა და ქვეყნის წინაშე ვაცხადებთ ამ კონსტიტუციას." (პრეამბულა) "რწმენისა და აღმსარებლობის თავისუფლებასთან ერთად სახელმწიფო აღიარებს საქართველოს სამოციქულო ავტოკეფალური მართლმადიდებელი ეკლესიის განსაკუთრებულ როლს საქართველოს ისტორიაში და მის დამოუკიდებლობას სახელმწიფოსაგან. (...)" (მუხლი 8) "თანამდებობის დაკავების წინ, არჩევის დღიდან მესამე კვირა დღეს საქართველოს ახალარჩეული პრეზიდენტი მიმართავს ხალხს და დებს ფიცს: „მე, საქართველოს პრეზიდენტი, ღვთისა და ერის წინაშე ვფიცავ, რომ დავიცავ საქართველოს კონსტიტუციას, ქვეყნის დამოუკიდებლობას, ერთიანობასა და განუყოფლობას, კეთილსინდისიერად აღვასრულებ პრეზიდენტის მოვალეობას, ვიზრუნებ ჩემი ქვეყნის მოქალაქეთა უსაფრთხოებისა და კეთილდღეობისათვის, ჩემი ხალხისა და მამულის აღორძინებისა და ძლევამოსილებისათვის“." (მუხლი 51;1)"	See also: Concordat between the Georgian State and the Georgian Orthodox Church
Germany (West)	1949	Nominatio	"Conscious of their responsibility before God and man, (...) the German people, in the exercise of their constituent power, have adopted this Basic Law."	(in German) "Im Bewußtsein seiner Verantwortung vor Gott und den Menschen (...) hat sich das Deutsche Volk kraft seiner verfassungsgebenden Gewalt dieses Grundgesetz gegeben."	
Greece	1975	Invocatio	"In the name of the Holy and Consubstantial and Indivisible Trinity."	(in Greek) "Εν ονόματι της Αγίας και Ομοουσίου και Αδιαιρέτου Τριάδος."	The preamble dates back to the first Greek constitution, adopted in 1822 during the Greek War of Independence against the Ottoman Empire.
Hungary	2011	Preamble, Nominatio	"God bless the Hungarians" "We recognise the role of Christianity in preserving nationhood. We value the various religious traditions of our country." "We, the Members of the National Assembly elected on 25 April 2010, being aware of our responsibility before God and man and in exercise of our constituent power, hereby adopt this to be the first unified Fundamental Law of Hungary."	"Isten, áldd meg a magyart!" "Elismerjük a kereszténység nemzetmegtartó szerepét. Becsüljük országunk különböző vallási hagyományait." "Mi, a 2010. április 25-én megválasztott Országgyűlés képviselői, Isten és ember előtti felelősségünk tudatában, élve alkotmányozó hatalmunkkal, Magyarország első egységes Alaptörvényét a fentiek szerint állapítjuk meg."	The amendment cited here of the Fundamental Law of Hungary is the original publication of the 2011 amendment, prior to subsequent revisions. Due to the works of the current political administration in Hungary, it is unclear as to how much of it is still in effect today.
Indonesia	1945	Invocatio	"... By the grace of God Almighty and urged by the lofty aspiration to exist as a free nation, Now therefore, the people of Indonesia declare herewith their independence, ..." "... which is to be established as the State of the Republic of Indonesia with sovereignty of the people and based on the belief in the One and Only God, ..."	"... Atas berkat rahmat Allah Yang Maha Kuasa, dan dengan didorongkan oleh keinginan luhur supaya berkehidupan kebangsaan yang bebas, maka rakyat Indonesia menyatakan dengan ini kemerdekaannya, ..." "... yang terbentuk dalam suatu susunan Negara Republik Indonesia yang berkedaulatan rakyat dengan berdasarkan kepada, Ketuhanan Yang Maha Esa,..."	
Iran	1979	Nominatio	"The Constitution of the Islamic Republic of Iran advances the cultural, social, political, and economic institutions of Iranian society based on Islamic principles and norms, which represent an honest aspiration of the Islamic Ummah."		The preamble goes on to outline the Islamic nature of the Republic at great length with numerous references to God, and the constitutional text establishes the state as "a system based on belief in the One God".
Iraq	2005	Preamble, Invocatio	"In the name of God, the Most merciful, the Most compassionate" "(...) “I swear by God Almighty to carry out my legal duties and responsibilities with devotion and integrity and preserve the independence and sovereignty of Iraq, (...) and pledge to implement legislation faithfully and neutrally. God is my witness.”"		
Ireland	1937	Invocatio	"In the Name of the Most Holy Trinity, from Whom is all authority and to Whom, as our final end, all actions both of men and States must be referred, We, the people of Éire, humbly acknowledging all our obligations to our Divine Lord, Jesus Christ, who sustained our fathers through centuries of trial, (...) do hereby adopt, enact, and give to ourselves this Constitution."	(in Irish)"In Ainm na Tríonóide Ró-Naofa is tobar don uile údarás agus gur chuici, ós í is críoch dheireanach dúinn, is dírithe ní amháin gníomhartha daoine ach gníomhartha Stát, Ar mbeith dúinne, muintir na hÉireann, ag admháil go huiríseal a mhéid atáimid faoi chomaoin ag Íosa Críost, ár dTiarna Dia, a thug comhfhurtacht dár sinsir i ngach cruatan ina rabhadar ar feadh na gcéadta bliain, (...) Atáimid leis seo ag gabháil an Bhunreachta seo chugainn, agus á achtú agus á thíolacadh dúinn féin."	Articles referring to God are: 6.1 (" All powers of government, legislative, executive and judicial, derive, under God, from the people"); 44.1 ("The State acknowledges that the homage of public worship is due to Almighty God. It shall hold His Name in reverence, and shall respect and honour religion."); and the oaths prescribed for the President (12.8), the Council of State (31.4), and the Judiciary (34.5.1).
Kuwait	1962	Invocatio	"In the name of Allah, the Beneficent, the Merciful, We, Abdullah al-Salim al-Sabah, ... do hereby approve this Constitution and promulgate it."		
Liberia	1986	Nominatio	"We the People of the Republic of Liberia: Acknowledging our devout gratitude to God for our existence as a Free, Sovereign and Independent State, and relying on His Divine Guidance for our survival as a Nation; ... Do hereby solemnly make, establish, proclaim, and publish this Constitution for the governance of the Republic of Liberia."	(Original text in English)	
Madagascar	1992	Nominatio	"The sovereign Malagasy people, profoundly attached to their cultural and spiritual values, especially to the basis of national unity; affirming their belief in God the Creator; ... declares: ..."		
Mauritania	1991	Nominatio	"Trusting in the omnipotence of Allah, the Mauritanian people proclaims ..."		
Nicaragua	1987	Nominatio	"In the Name of the Nicaraguan people, all democratic, patriotic and revolutionary parties and organizations of Nicaragua, its men and women, its workers and peasants, its glorious youth, its heroic mothers, those Christians who inspired by their belief in GOD have joined and committed themselves to the struggle for the liberation of the oppressed, its patriotic intellectuals, and all those who through their productive work contribute to the defense of the Homeland; ... We promulgate the following POLITICAL CONSTITUTION OF THE REPUBLIC OF NICARAGUA"	(in Spanish) "En Nombre Del pueblo nicaragüense; de todos los partidos y organizaciones democráticas, patrióticas y revolucionarias de Nicaragua; de sus hombres y mujeres; de sus obreros y campesinos; de su gloriosa juventud; de sus heroicas madres; de los cristianos que desde su fe en DIOS se han comprometido e insertado en la lucha por la liberación de los oprimidos; de sus intelectuales patrióticos; y de todos los que con su trabajo productivo contribuyen a la defense de la Patria. ... Promulgamos la siguiente CONSTITUCIÓN POLÍTICA DE LA REPÚBLICA DE NICARAGUA"	
Norway	1814		"Our values remain from our Christian and humanist heritage..." "As soon as the King, being of age, accedes to the Government, he shall take the following oath before the Storting: «I promise and swear that I will govern the Kingdom of Norway in accordance with its Constitution and Laws; so help me God, the Almighty and Omniscient.»"	"Verdigrunnlaget forblir vår kristne og humanistiske arv." "Så snart kongen, som myndig, tiltrer regjeringen, avlegger han følgende ed for Stortinget: «Jeg lover og sverger å ville regjere kongeriket Norge i overensstemmelse med dets konstitusjon og lover, så sant hjelpe meg Gud den allmektige og allvitende!»"	§2 §9
Pakistan	1973		"Whereas sovereignty over the entire Universe belongs to Almighty Allah alone, and the authority to be exercised by the people of Pakistan within the limits prescribed by Him is a sacred trust"		
Papua New Guinea	1975	Preamble	WE, THE PEOPLE OF PAPUA NEW GUINEA — united in one nation, pay homage to the memory of our ancestors — the source of our strength and origin of our combined heritage - acknowledge the worthy customs and traditional wisdoms of our people — which have come down to us from generation to generation pledge ourselves to guard and pass on to those who come after us our noble traditions and the Christian principles that are ours now. By authority of our inherent right as ancient, free and independent peoples WE, THE PEOPLE, do now establish this sovereign nation and declare ourselves, under the guiding hand of God, to be the Independent State of Papua New Guinea.	(Original text in English)	
Paraguay	1992	Invocatio	"The Paraguayan people, through their legitimate representatives convening at the National Constituent Assembly, pleading to God, ... hereby approve and promulgate this Constitution."	(in Spanish) "El pueblo paraguayo, por medio de sus legítimos representantes reunidos en Convención Nacional Constituyente, invocando Dios, ... SANCIONA Y PROMULGA esta Constitución."	
Peru	1993	Invocatio	"The Democratic Constituent Congress invoking Almighty God, ... has resolved to enact the following Constitution:"	(in Spanish) "El Congreso Constituyente Democrático, invocando a Dios Todopoderoso, ... ha resuelto dar la siguiente Constitución:"	
Philippines	1987	Invocatio	We, the sovereign Filipino people, imploring the aid of Almighty God, ... do ordain and promulgate this Constitution.		
Poland	1997	Nominatio	"We, the Polish Nation – all citizens of the Republic, both those who believe in God as the source of truth, justice, good and beauty, as well as those not sharing such faith but respecting those universal values as arising from other sources, (...) beholden to our ancestors (...) for our culture rooted in the Christian heritage of the Nation and in universal human values, (...) recognizing our responsibility before God or our own consciences, hereby establish this Constitution of the Republic of Poland"	(in Polish) "My, Naród Polski - wszyscy obywatele Rzeczypospolitej, zarówno wierzący w Boga będącego źródłem prawdy, sprawiedliwości, dobra i piękna, jak i nie podzielający tej wiary, a te uniwersalne wartości wywodzący z innych źródeł, (...) w poczuciu odpowiedzialności przed Bogiem lub przed własnym sumieniem, ustanawiamy Konstytucję Rzeczypospolitej Polskiej"	The preamble's juxtaposition of a nominatio dei with an evocation of humanist values emerged as an attempt to compromise between the Catholic Church's demand for a strong invocatio dei and opposition by Left and liberal circles who feared the establishment of a confessional state.
Russia	2020	Nominatio	"The Russian Federation, united by the millennium history, preserving the memory of the ancestors who conveyed to us ideals and belief in God, as well as continuity of development of the Russian state, recognises the unanimity of the State that was established historically."	"Российская Федерация, объединенная тысячелетней историей, сохраняя память предков, передавших нам идеалы и веру в Бога, а также преемственность в развитии Российского государства, признает исторически сложившееся государственное единство."	
Rwanda	1991	Nominatio	"The National Council for Development, meeting as Constituent Assembly on 30 May 1991; Trusting in God Almighty; ... Does establish and adopt this Constitution for the Republic of Rwanda"		
Samoa	2017		"Samoa is a Christian nation founded of God the Father, the Son and the Holy Spirit".		
South Africa	1996	Nominatio	"May God protect our people. Nkosi Sikelel' iAfrika. Morena boloka setjhaba sa heso. God seën Suid-Afrika. God bless South Africa. Mudzimu fhatutshedza Afurika. Hosi katekisa Afrika."		This multi-lingual evocation, set at the end of the preamble, has been called a "rhetorical petition prayer".
Sweden (Act of Succession)	1810	Nominatio	"We CARL, by the Grace of God, King of Sweden, the Goths, and the Wends, &c., &c., &c., Heir to Norway, Duke of Schleswig Holstein, Stormarn and Ditmarsen, Count of Oldenburg and Delmenhorst, &c., &c.,(...) " "We, the undersigned Estates of the Realm of Sweden, counts, barons, bishops, knights, and nobility, clergy, burghers and peasants, now convened in extraordinary general session of the Riksdag (...) hereby make known that (...) our present most gracious King and Lord, Carl XIII, after his death (be it long deferred by the Grace of God Almighty) to be crowned and hailed as King of Sweden" (...) "In witness of the fact that all that has been thus prescribed is identical with our intent and decision we, representing all the Estates of the Realm of Sweden, hereto attach our names and seals, in Örebro, the twenty-sixth day of September, in the year of our Lord one thousand eight hundred and ten." (...) "In witness whereof We have this day with Our own hand signed and confirmed it, and duly affixed Our Royal seal thereto, in Örebro, on the twenty-sixth day of September, in the year of our Lord and Saviour Jesus Christ one thousand eight hundred and ten."	(in Swedish) "Vi CARL, med Guds nåde, Sveriges, Götes och Vendes Konung &c. &c. &c., arvinge till Norge, hertig till Schleswig Holstein, Stormarn och Ditmarsen, greve till Oldenburg och Delmenhorst &c. &c.,(...)" "Vi efterskrivne Svea rikes Ständer, grevar, friherrar, biskopar, ridderskap och adel, klerkeri, borgerskap och menige allmoge, som nu här i Örebro till allmän urtima riksdag församlade äro, göre veterligt: (...) Vår nu regerande allernådigste Konung och Herre, Carl den XIII:e, efter dess dödliga frånfälle (varmed den Högste Guden nådeligen länge fördröje) i regeringen över Svea rike samt detsamma underlydande länder efterträda, till Sveriges Konung krönas och hyllas" (...) "Till yttermera visso, att vi allt detta föreskrivna så belevat och beslutit, have vi samtlige Svea rikes Ständer detta underskrivit och beseglat; som skedde i Örebro den tjugusjätte dagen i september månad, år efter Kristi börd, ett tusende åttahundrade och på det tionde." (...) "Till yttermera visso have Vi detta med egen hand underskrivit och bekräftat, samt Vårt kungl. insegel låtit veterligen hänga här nedanföre, som skedde i Örebro, den tjugosjätte dagen i september månad, året efter Vår Herres och Frälsares Jesu Kristi börd, det ett tusende åttahundrade och på det tionde."	The preamble of the 1810 Act of Succession, which remains part of the fundamental laws, calls upon God several times according to the forms of the time
Switzerland	1999	Invocatio	"In the name of Almighty God! The Swiss People and the Cantons (...) adopt the following Constitution:"	(in German) "Im Namen Gottes des Allmächtigen! Das Schweizervolk und die Kantone (...) geben sich folgende Verfassung:" (in French) "Au nom de Dieu Tout-Puissant! Le peuple et les cantons suisses (...) arrêtent la Constitution que voici:"	The invocation of God is a Swiss constitutional tradition going back to the Federal Charter of 1291.
Tunisia	1959	Invocatio	"In the name of God, the Compassionate and Merciful ... We, the representatives of the Tunisian people, free and sovereign, proclaim, by the Grace of God, the present Constitution."		
Ukraine	1996	Nominatio	"The Verkhovna Rada of Ukraine, (...) aware of our responsibility before God, our own conscience, past, present and future generations, (...) adopts this Constitution"		
Vanuatu	1980	Nominatio	"WE, the people of Vanuatu... HEREBY proclaim the establishment of the united and free Republic of Vanuatu founded on traditional Melanesian values, faith in God, and Christian principles"		
Venezuela	1999	Nominatio	"The people of Venezuela, exercising their powers of creation and invoking the protection of God, the historic example of our Liberator Simon Bolivar and the heroism and sacrifice of our aboriginal ancestors and the forerunners and founders of a free and sovereign nation; ... exercising their innate power through their representatives comprising the National Constituent Assembly, by their freely cast vote and in a democratic Referendum, hereby ordain the following CONSTITUTION"	(in Spanish) "El pueblo de Venezuela, en ejercicio de sus poderes creadores e invocando la protección de Dios, el ejemplo histórico de nuestro Libertador Simón Bolívar y el heroísmo y sacrificio de nuestros antepasados aborígenes y de los precursores y forjadores de una patria libre y soberana; ... en ejercicio de su poder originario representado por la Asamblea Nacional Constituyente mediante el voto libre y en referendo democrático, decreta la siguiente CONSTITUCIÓN"	
Zambia	1991	Preamble	"WE, THE PEOPLE OF ZAMBIA: ACKNOWLEDGE the supremacy of God Almighty; DECLARE the Republic a Christian Nation while upholding a person’s right to freedom of conscience, belief or religion; (...)"	(Original text in English)	

== See also ==
- Christian amendment
- Christian state
- enthronement movement
