= Preamble to the Constitution of Georgia (U.S. state) =

The Preamble to the Georgia State Constitution is a brief introductory statement of the fundamental purposes and guiding principles which the Constitution is meant to serve. It expresses in general terms the intentions of its authors and is sometimes referred by the courts.

== Text ==
To perpetuate the principles of free government, insure justice to all, preserve peace, promote the interest and happiness of the citizen and of the family, and transmit to posterity the enjoyment of liberty, we the people of Georgia, relying upon the protection and guidance of Almighty God, do ordain and establish this Constitution.

== Meaning and application ==
The Preamble does not assign any powers to the state government or provide specific limitations on government action. Despite the limited nature of the Preamble it has been cited in the courts. For example, the Preamble was cited in the cases of Roberts v. Ravenwood Church of Wicca, Dixon v. Dixon, Clabough v. Rachwal and Arnold v. Arnold.

=== Judicial relevance ===
==== Examples ====
An instance of the courts utilizing the Preamble to the Constitution is Roberts v. Ravenwood Church of Wicca 249 Ga. 348 (1982). The case concerned an ad valorem tax dispute between Fulton County's tax authority and the Ravenwood Church of Wicca. Primarily, this issue was centered around the Free Exercise Clause of the First Amendment and the Equal Protection Clause of the Fourteenth Amendment regarding whether or not the Ravenwood Church of Wicca was a religion and, thus, exempt from the ad valorem tax. The majority of the justices concurred, barring Chief Justice C.J. Jordan and Justice J. Clarke. The former based his dissent on the portion of the Preamble which states "relying upon the protection and guidance of Almighty God" and went on to define God as "the Being perfect in power, wisdom and goodness whom men worship as creator and ruler of the universe."

In the case of Dixon v. Dixon, 183 Ga. 756 (1987) the portion of the Preamble stating, "promote the interest and happiness ... of the family" was cited in a dissent by Judge J. Beasley. Dixon v. Dixon was a child custody case wherein the mother was allegedly "cohabiting with a man to whom she is not married while the child is living with her," and the father sought custody based on her actions. The majority assent claimed that there was enough evidence to warrant a change of custody. However, Judge Beasley's dissent focused on his opinion that the evidence gathered concerning such cohabitation was "speculative".

Arnold v. Arnold, 189 Ga. App. 101 (1988), was a case concerning parental immunity, as it applied to the family immunity doctrine, brought before the Coweta Superior Court. In Arnold v. Arnold, the question of whether one sibling could legally sue another was asked and the portion of the Preamble stating "To ... promote the interest and happiness of the citizen and of the family, ... we the people of Georgia ... do ordain and establish this Constitution" was quoted in reference to an earlier case, Clabough v. Rachwal. The court found that, in this case, the family immunity doctrine was not applicable.

== See also ==
Preamble
