= Title 2 of the Swiss Federal Constitution =

Title 2 of the Swiss Federal Constitution of 18 April 1999, entitled "Fundamental Rights, Civil Rights and Social Goals", contains a comprehensive and directly enforceable bill of rights, as well as a set of social goals which the state authorities are to pay heed to. A few rights, notably political ones, are explicitly reserved to Swiss citizens, while all others apply to all persons in Switzerland, including (insofar as possible) legal entities such as corporations.

While the 1874 constitution enumerated only a few civil rights, the 1999 constitution explicitly codifies the fundamental rights recognised in the case law of the Supreme Court and the European Court of Human Rights. It also incorporates the fundamental rights guaranteed in the European Convention on Human Rights, which Switzerland has ratified.

== Chapter 1: Fundamental Rights ==
^{1} Any limitation of a fundamental right requires a legal basis. Grave limitations must be expressly foreseen by statute. Cases of clear and present danger are reserved.
^{2} Any limitation of a fundamental right must be justified by public interest, or serve for the protection of fundamental rights of other persons.
^{3} Limitations of fundamental rights must be proportionate to the goals pursued.
^{4} The essence of fundamental rights is inviolable.

— Article 36

=== Application and limitation of fundamental rights ===
Articles 35 and 36 contain the general rules governing the application of fundamental rights. According to article 35, "the fundamental rights shall be realized in the entire legal system". This implies that the Constitution's fundamental rights are binding on all levels of state authorities and are directly enforceable in the courts, although the Constitution prohibits judicial review of federal statutes in article 190. Going beyond the classical notion of civil rights as purely defensive rights against the state, though, article 35 also mandates the authorities to give meaning to the fundamental rights in their legislative and executive acts, and to actively protect fundamental rights even to some degree against non-state actors. In between private actors, the fundamental rights do not apply directly. Their "horizontal effect", though, is supposed to be realised through legislation to the extent the rights are suited to application between private persons.

Article 36 outlines the circumstances under which the exercise of classical "negative" rights can be limited. Exceptions must be limited to actions against those persons causing a clear and present danger that legislation cannot address in time. Any public interest justifying a limitation of rights must arise from the Constitution or from constitutional statutes. Proportionality requires that a limitation of rights be suitable and required to achieve its goal, and that the degree of limitation is reasonable in view of that goal. Essential guarantees, such as the prohibition on torture, the death penalty and censorship cannot be limited (see also art. 15 ECHR and jus cogens).

=== Human rights and civil liberties ===
The bill of rights begins in article 7 by stating that "human dignity shall be respected and protected". This is a fundamental principle of the state that should inform all of its acts, a guideline to the interpretation of all law, and under certain circumstances a directly applicable fundamental right. As such, it prohibits inhuman treatment and guarantees the right of people to be treated as a subject, not an object.

Article 8 establishes equality before the law for all and prohibits discrimination based e.g. on grounds of origin, (perceived) race, sex, age, language, social position, lifestyle (including sexual orientation), personal convictions or disabilities. The principle of equality implies economic neutrality of the state, political equality and equality of opportunity. The principle of non-discrimination prohibits differential treatment based on the listed criteria except for clear objective reasons and in a proportionate manner. Affirmative action is permitted.

Every person has the right to be treated by the state organs without arbitrariness and in good faith.

— Article 9

Article 9's prohibition of arbitrary treatment, an extension of the rule of law, guards individuals against rules or decisions of the state that have no serious, objective reasons, or that are meaning- and pointless. A decision is arbitrary only if its result is obviously untenable or contrary to the facts, or if it blatantly violates the law or the idea of justice. This rule, which is illimitable, permeates the entire legal system. Applied subsidiarily where other rights are unavailable, it features prominently in Supreme Court jurisprudence, which reviews questions of cantonal law that do not involve rules of federal or constitutional law not de novo, but only for arbitrary application of the law. However, the Court applies a narrow rule of standing to independent claims of arbitrary treatment, which has caused wide scholarly criticism. The rule of good faith requires the state to protect people's vested confidence in state actions, such as in governmental informations, and prohibits the abuse of rights by the state, such as through undue delays.

Article 10 prohibits the death penalty, torture and cruel, inhuman or degrading treatment. It also refers to the right to live, which does not prohibit abortion or passive euthanasia, both of which are legal in Switzerland. Also, Article 10 provides for a "right to personal liberty, particularly to corporal and mental integrity, and to freedom of movement". Personal liberty, according to case law, covers all important aspects of personal development and lifestyle, such as choices in diet, healthcare, personal relations and sexual activity. Article 11, a novel provision in the 1999 constitution, extends particular protection to children and young people.

Persons in distress and incapable of looking after themselves have the right to be helped and assisted, and to receive the means that are indispensable for leading a life in human dignity.

— Article 12

Article 12, one of few enforceable social rights in the Constitution, provides for a right to obtain the means indispensable for leading a simple, dignified life. The cantons and municipalities are responsible for running welfare programmes to that effect. The Supreme Court has held that the right may not be limited, e.g. to coerce illegal immigrants into leaving the country.

The subsequent articles proceed to guarantee the right to privacy (art. 13), the right to marriage and to have a family (art. 14), as well as the freedom of religion and philosophy (art. 15), opinion, information (art. 16), the media (art. 17), language (art. 18), science (art. 20), art (art. 21), assembly (art. 22) and association (art. 23). Also, article 19 provides for a right to free primary education.

Freedom of domicile anywhere in the country (art. 24) and protection against extradition without consent (art. 25) are rights reserved to Swiss citizens. However, foreigners enjoy the guarantee of non-refoulement provided by article 25.

=== Economic rights ===
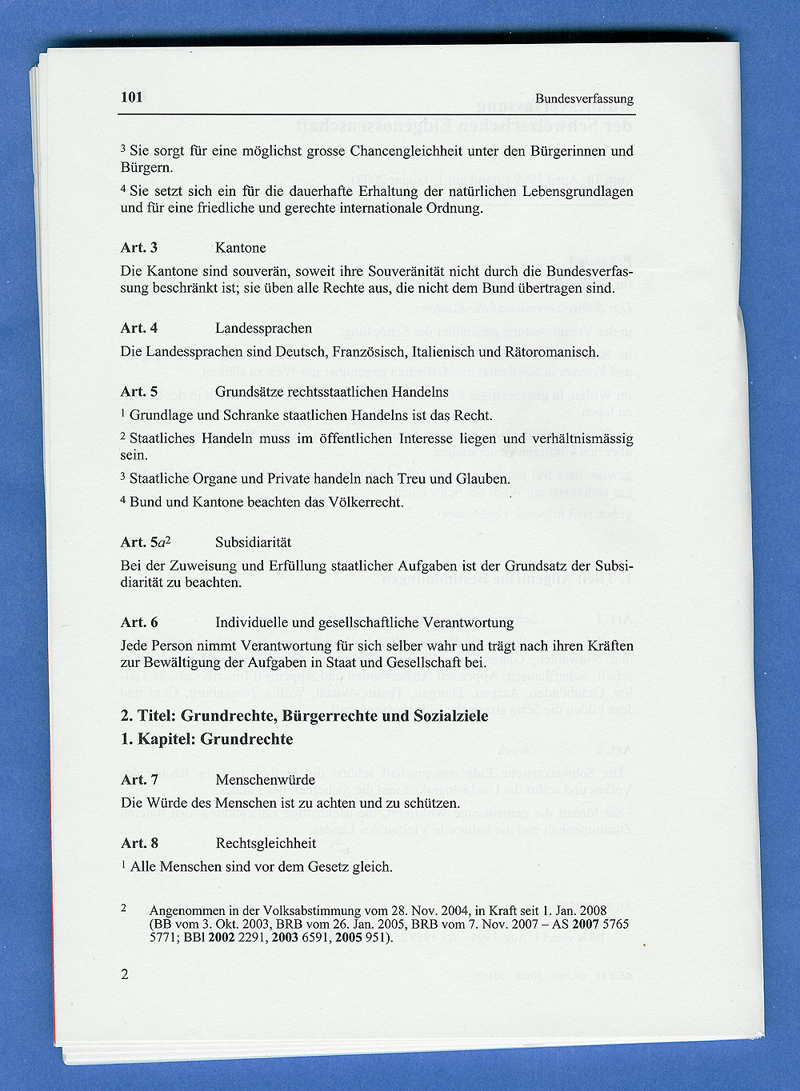
The beginning of the title 2, on the second page of the German edition of the Swiss Federal Constitution of 1999. The Federal Chancellery of Switzerland publishes translations in German, French, Italian, Romansh and English.

Articles 26 to 28 cover fundamental economic rights. The right to property is guaranteed, and expropriations made subject to full compensation, by article 26. Article 27 guarantees economic freedom, free choice of profession and free private enterprise. Although some state monopolies are permitted (by way of art. 94), and differing cantonal regulations still impede the intercantonal exercise of some regulated professions, the wide extent to which economic freedom is guaranteed is a distinguishing feature of the Swiss constitution, both in theory and practice. Parliament's extensive discussions about this provision reflect a fundamental systemic decision in favour of a free market economy.

Article 28 guarantees the right of both employers and employees to unionise. Strikes and lockouts are declared permissible, but only when they relate to labour relations (i.e., general or political strikes are not covered), do not violate collective agreements, are proportionate in scope and are organised by unions (i.e., are not wildcat strikes). The provision reflects a compromise solution found after long, acrimonious parliamentary debates.

=== Procedural guarantees ===
Articles 29 to 32 guarantee essential aspects of due process. Article 29 covers the rights to fair trial and to an effective remedy as provided for in articles six and thirteen of the ECHR. Specifically, it guarantees the right to be treated equally and fairly within a reasonable time in legal or administrative proceedings, the right to be heard, and the right of indigents to free legal representation (generally realised through appointed private counsel). The right to be heard notably covers the right to be informed about and to participate in all proceedings concerning oneself, the right to offer and to examine evidence (such as to call and question witnesses) and the right to a well-reasoned decision. Article 29 also prohibits the delay or denial of justice, or excessive formalism in its administration.

^{1} No person may be deprived of liberty except in the cases and in the forms provided by statute.
^{2} All persons deprived of their liberty have the right to be informed immediately, and in a language that they understand, of the reasons for their detention, and of their rights. They must have the opportunity to assert their rights. In particular, they have the right to have their close relatives informed.
^{3} Every person taken into preventive detention has the right to be brought before a judge without delay; the judge shall decide whether the person shall remain in detention or shall be released. Every person in preventive detention has the right to be judged within a reasonable time.
^{4} All persons who are deprived of their liberty without a trial have the right to seize a court at any time. The court shall decide as soon as possible whether the detention is legal.

— Article 31

Article 29a, in addition, guarantees a right to have legal disputes judged by a judicial authority. This provision, which was adopted by popular vote in 2000 and entered into force in 2007, is intended to realise more fully the right guaranteed by article 6 of the ECHR to a hearing by an "independent and impartial tribunal established by law". In administrative law in particular, access to a court was previously not possible in all cases. As a result of this constitutional provision, the Federal Administrative Court replaced a number of administrative review panels in 2007. The provision still allows statutes to exclude judicial review in "exceptional cases" that are considered not amenable to judicial review, such as actes de gouvernement e.g. in the area of national security, or acts of pardon or clemency. In any case, the provision's impact remains somewhat limited because article 190 excludes all federal statutes from judicial review.

Article 30 sets minimal standards for judicial procedures, guaranteeing access to independent and impartial courts established by law, as well as the right to an open trial. It establishes the principle of separation of powers as relating to the judiciary.

Article 31 encompasses the rights guaranteed in article 5 of the ECHR, what the common law calls the right to petition for a writ of habeas corpus, and also what is known in the U.S. as the duty to administer "Miranda warnings" to arrested persons. Article 32 outlines the fundamentals of criminal procedure. They include the presumption of innocence (which includes the principle of in dubio pro reo and the right to refuse self-incrimination), the right to appeal and the right to effective defence (including the assistance of counsel).

Article 33 guarantees the right to petition authorities without the fear of sanction. Article 34 guarantees the free exercise of the citizens' political rights as provided for by the federal and cantonal constitutions. This means that results of votes and elections must reflect the free, unaltered will of the people and that the government may not engage in propaganda to influence a vote or election (although it may provide "objective information"). Switzerland has registered a reservation with respect to article 25 of the ICCPR, which guarantees the right to a secret ballot, because the Landsgemeinde assembly system used by two cantons and many municipalities does not allow for secrecy.

== Chapter 2: Citizenship and Political Rights ==
Swiss citizenship, according to article 37, is legally a consequence of cantonal and municipal citizenship, reflecting the three-tiered setup of the Swiss state. Nonetheless, federal law regulates the general rules of acquisition and loss of citizenship, as set forth in article 38. The exact procedure of acquiring citizenship is governed by cantonal law. Some cantons have instituted administrative bodies to process petitions for citizenship, while in others, prospective citizens are vetted, and their petitions voted on, by a municipal citizens' assembly. These procedures are a subject of perennial political controversy between advocates of a more or less strict immigration policy.

Article 37 prohibits privileges or prejudices associated with any particular cantonal or municipal citizenship. Still, the Constitution makes allowance for the continued existence of bourgeoisies and corporations. These are traditional civic associations carried over from the Old Swiss Confederacy, often consisting of formerly aristocratic families, but regulated by cantonal public law.

Article 39 stipulates that all Swiss citizens may exercise full municipal, cantonal and national political rights at their place of residence, and article 40 allows Swiss citizens domiciled abroad to exercise political rights in Switzerland.

== Chapter 3: Social Goals ==
Article 41 consists of a list of "social goals" which the confederation and the cantons "shall strive to ensure". They include the availability of social security, health care, housing and public education.

These goals are of a programmatic nature, and are declared not to be directly enforceable. They are also counterbalanced by a reference to individual responsibility in article 6. This means that, contrary to many other Western constitutions, so-called positive or second- and third generation rights are mostly absent from the constitutional text, although they are more widely recognised in legal doctrine and practice. Even so, the inclusion of this provision in the constitution was strongly contested on grounds of economic policy and cantonal autonomy.

== Bibliography ==
- Bernhard Ehrenzeller, Philipp Mastronardi, Rainer J. Schweizer, Klaus A. Vallender (eds.) (2002). Die schweizerische Bundesverfassung, Kommentar (in German). ISBN 3-905455-70-6.. Cited as Ehrenzeller.
- English translation of the constitution
