= Preamble and Title 1 of the Swiss Federal Constitution =

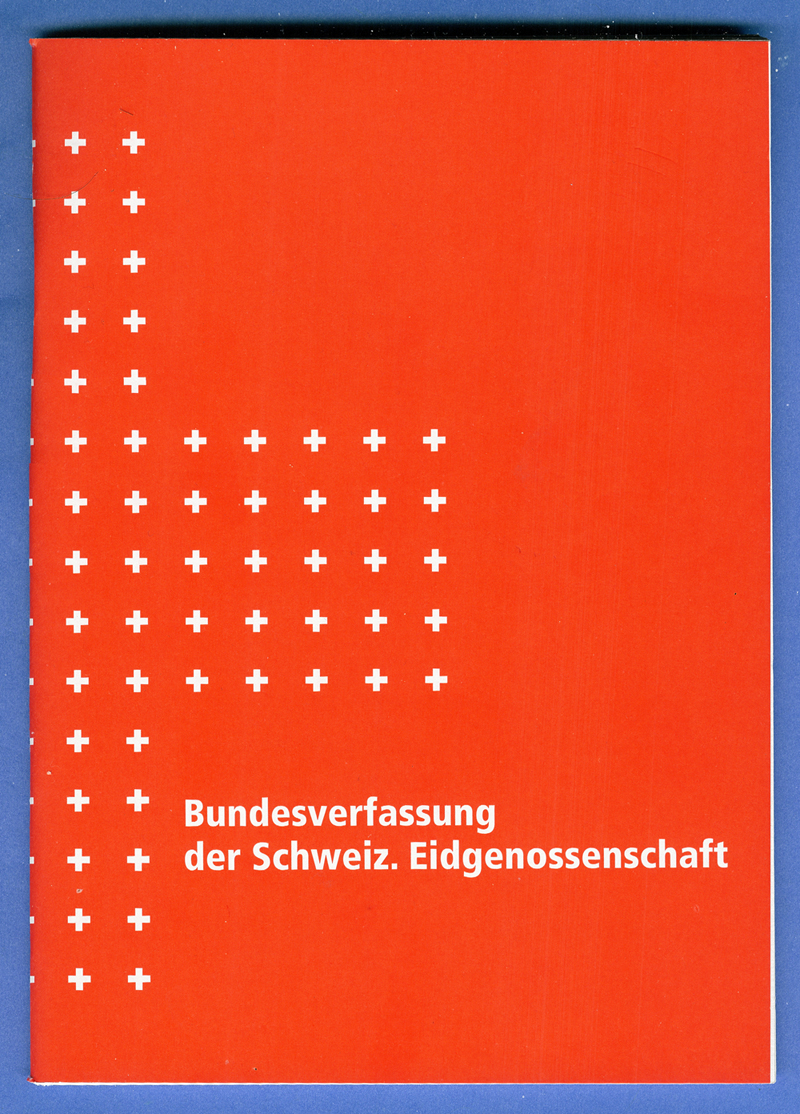
The cover of the German edition of the Swiss Federal Constitution of 1999. The Federal Chancellery of Switzerland publishes translations in German, French, Italian, Romansh and English.

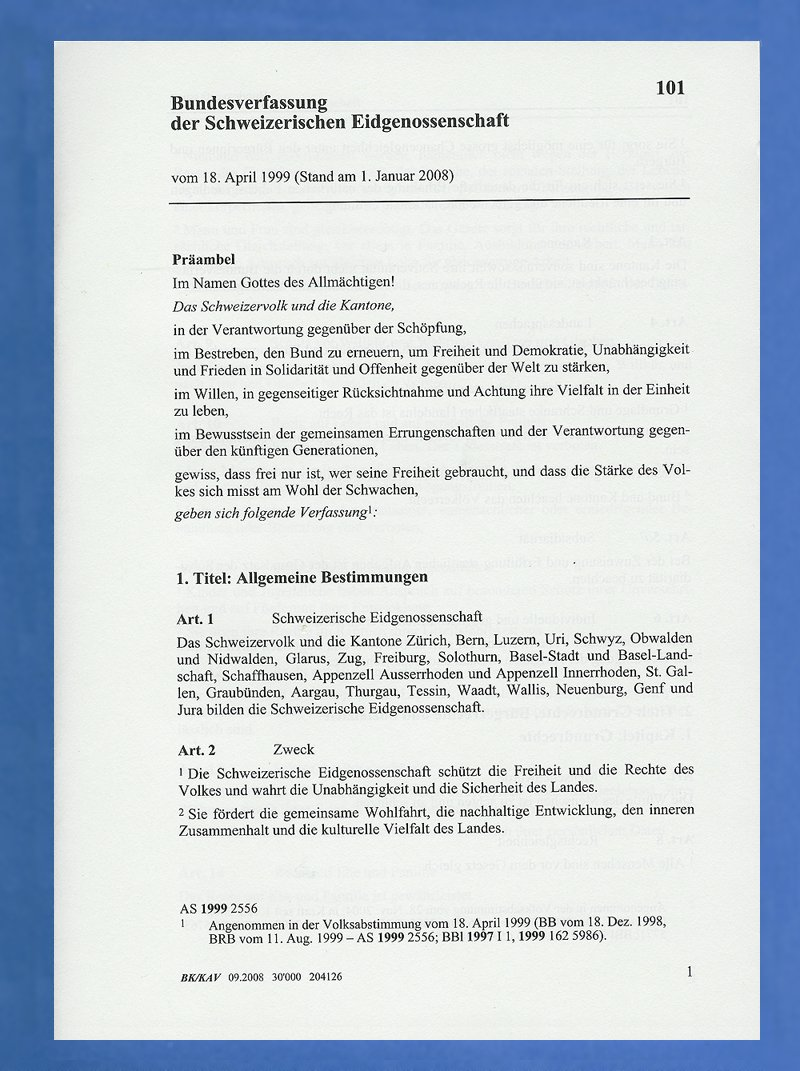
Preamble and beginning of the title 1 of the German edition of the Swiss Federal Constitution

The preamble and the first title of the Swiss Federal Constitution of 18 April 1999 determine the general outlines of Switzerland as a democratic federal republic of 26 cantons governed by the rule of law.

== Preamble ==
The preamble to the Constitution states, in full:

In the name of Almighty God!
The Swiss People and the Cantons,
mindful of their responsibility towards creation,
resolved to renew their alliance so as to strengthen liberty, democracy, independence and peace in a spirit of solidarity and openness towards the world,
determined to live together with mutual consideration and respect for their diversity,
conscious of their common achievements and their responsibility towards future generations,
and in the knowledge that only those who use their freedom remain free, and that the strength of a people is measured by the well-being of its weakest members;
adopt the following Constitution:

By opening with a solemn invocation of God, the preamble is in line with all preceding Swiss constitutional documents, back to the Federal Charter of 1291, except for the constitutions adopted under French sway in the time of the Helvetic Republic. Apart from continuing tradition, the invocatio dei is understood to be a reference to transcendental values underlying society, putting into perspective any claims to authority by the State – a merely human creation.

The preamble was authored by journalist Daniel S. Miéville, and inspired in part by a 1977 draft by writer Adolf Muschg. It is a symbolic summation of the will to and purpose of statehood, a declaration of intent by the popular Sovereign, an integrating avowal of the Swiss people's fundamental values, and a binding mandate to the State's authorities. It was among the most contested provisions in the course of the 1999 constitutional revision.

== Title 1: General Provisions ==
The general provisions (articles 1–6) define the characteristic traits of the Swiss state on all of its three levels of authority: federal, cantonal and municipal. They are addressed to the state authorities, programmatic in scope and not directly enforceable. Notably, provisions about the symbols of the state such as the flag or anthem are left out.

Article 1 constitutes the federal state, the Confederation, as consisting of the people and the 26 coëqual cantons listed in their traditional order of precedence. Article 2 enumerates the purposes of the state, which include protecting the liberty and the rights of the people, and ensuring the independence and security of the country. Like the preamble, this provision is of symbolic, historical, political and normative value.

Article 3 provides that "the Cantons are sovereign insofar as their sovereignty is not limited by the Federal Constitution; they shall exercise all rights which are not transferred to the Confederation." This maintains the "bottom-up" Swiss constitutional tradition according to which both the whole Confederation and the cantons are states in their own right. Much like U.S. states, the cantons are autonomous in their organisation and in their actions as states, although in principle the Confederation alone is a subject of international law. As in the U.S., the powers delegated by the cantons to the Confederation are enumerated in the Constitution, although in practice federal authority is construed and exercised extensively. Also, federal and cantonal competencies often overlap and interlock in complex ways.

Article 4 declares German, French, Italian and Romansh to be the "national languages", highlighting the prominence of Swiss multilingualism as an integral part of the country's self-conception.

Article 5 lists some of the fundamental aspects of the rule of law which the state is bound to observe, including the principles of obedience to law, proportionality, good faith and, due to pacta sunt servanda, respect for international law. The latter is customarily held to be self-executing and thus directly enforceable in Switzerland, with important exceptions.

Article 6, another preamble-like provision indicative of the Swiss' perception of themselves, counterbalances the "social goals" set forth in article 41 by stating that "all persons are responsible for themselves".

== Bibliography ==
- Bernhard Ehrenzeller, Philipp Mastronardi, Rainer J. Schweizer, Klaus A. Vallender (eds.) (2002). Die schweizerische Bundesverfassung, Kommentar (in German). ISBN 3-905455-70-6.. Cited as Ehrenzeller.
- English translation of the constitution
