= Preamble to the United Nations Charter =

Opening of the 1945 United Nations Charter

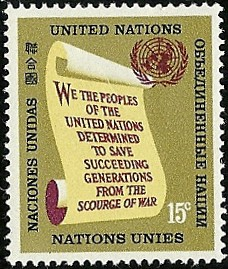
1965 stamp of the United Nations with the preamble to the charter

The Preamble to the United Nations Charter is the opening (preamble) of the 1945 United Nations Charter.

== History ==
Jan Smuts from South Africa originally wrote the opening lines of the Preamble as, "The High Contracting Parties, determined to prevent a recurrence of the fratricidal strife which twice in our generation has brought untold sorrow and loss upon mankind. . ." which would have been similar to the opening lines of the Covenant of the League of Nations. After considerable argument at the United Nations Conference on International Organization, held in San Francisco, particularly Soviet insistence that language regarding the equal rights and self-determination of peoples be included in the Charter, the Preamble was modified significantly.

The opening phrase "We the peoples of the United Nations ..", echoing the preamble of the United States Constitution, was suggested by US conference delegates Virginia Gildersleeve and Sol Bloom. The preambulatory phrase "In Larger Freedom" became the title of a UN reform proposal by the seventh Secretary-General, Kofi Annan.

== Text ==
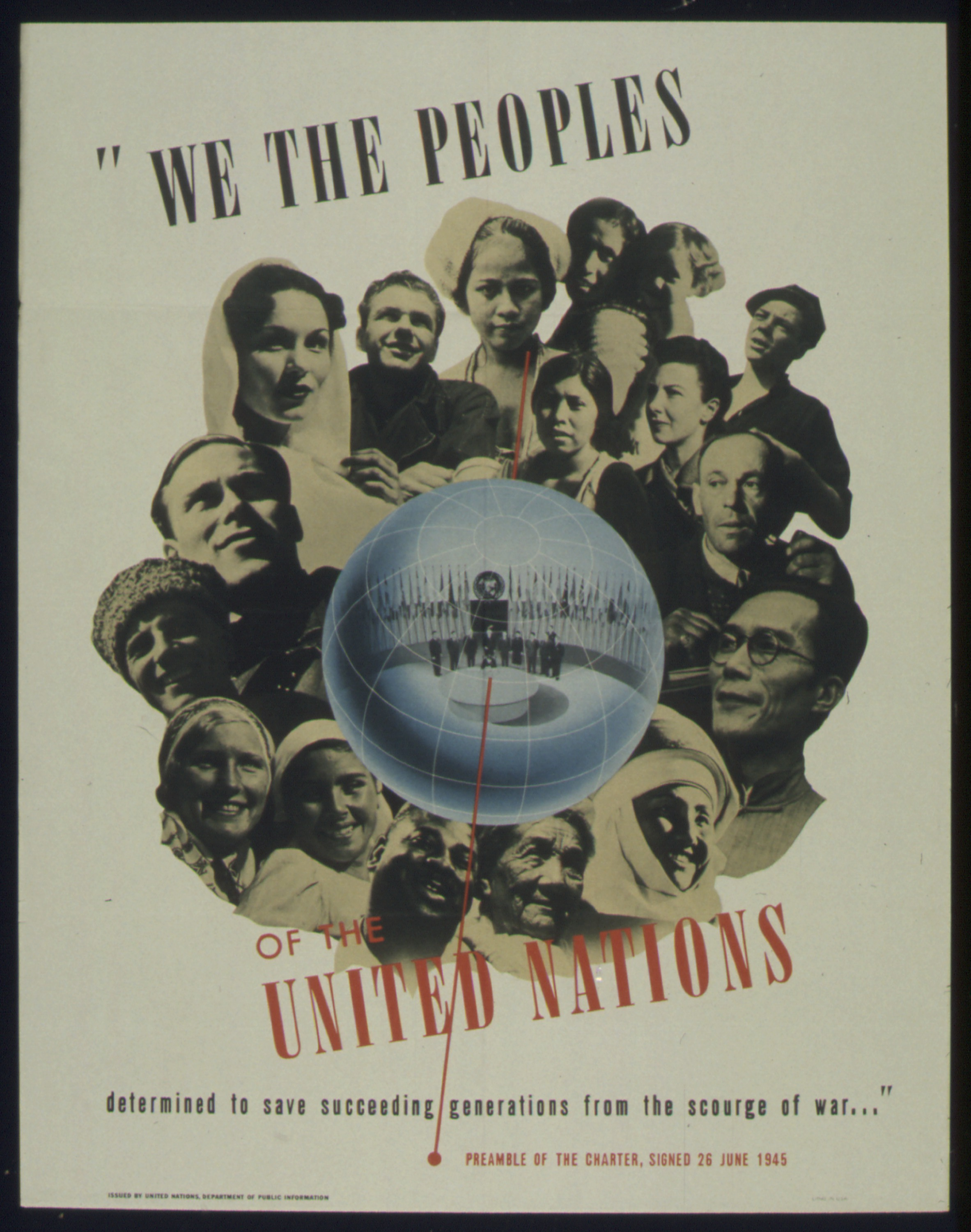

The Preamble reads as follows:

WE THE PEOPLES OF THE UNITED NATIONS DETERMINED

- to save succeeding generations from the scourge of war, which twice in our lifetime has brought untold sorrow to mankind, and
- to regain faith in fundamental human rights, in the dignity and worth of the human person, in the equal rights of men and women and of nations large and small, and
- to establish conditions under which justice and respect for the obligations arising from treaties and other sources of international law can be maintained, and
- to promote social progress and better standards of life in larger freedom,

AND FOR THESE ENDS

- to practice tolerance and live together in peace with one another as good neighbours, and
- to unite our strength to maintain international peace and security, and
- to ensure, by the acceptance of principles and the institution of methods, that armed force shall not be used, save in the common interest, and
- to employ international machinery for the promotion of the economic and social advancement of all peoples,

HAVE RESOLVED TO COMBINE OUR EFFORTS TO ACCOMPLISH THESE AIMS

Accordingly, our respective Governments, through representatives assembled in the city of San Francisco, who have exhibited their full powers found to be in good and due form, have agreed to the present Charter of the United Nations and do hereby establish an international organization to be known as the United Nations.
