= Preamble to the Canadian Charter of Rights and Freedoms =

Introductory provision for the constitutional Charter

The preamble to the Canadian Charter of Rights and Freedoms is the introductory sentence to the Constitution of Canada's Charter of Rights and Constitution Act, 1982. In full, it reads, "Whereas Canada is founded upon principles that recognize the supremacy of God and the rule of law".

== Interpretation ==
Writing in 1982, when the Charter came into force, constitutional scholar Peter Hogg noted that these words, being a preamble are limited in some direct applications of the law but can help to determine how other sections of the Charter should be read and applied. In this particular case, however, Hogg expressed concern as to how much help this preamble could be, noting the term "rule of law" is "notoriously vague" and that the mention of the "supremacy of God" can be considered in some contexts as contrary to section 2 of the Charter, which protects freedom of conscience, which Hogg felt would include a right to atheism. In R v Morgentaler (1988), Justice Bertha Wilson defined freedom of conscience as protecting "conscientious beliefs which are not religiously motivated", and balanced the preamble out with the statement that "the values entrenched in the Charter are those which characterize a free and democratic society".

In considering the legal implications of the preamble in the 1999 case R v Sharpe, the British Columbia Court of Appeal referred to it as a "dead letter" which the BC justices had "no authority to breathe life" into.

The Supreme Court did consider the preamble's mention of the rule of law in Reference Re Manitoba Language Rights (1985), noting that striking down most of Manitoba's laws as unconstitutional (because they were not enacted in both languages as required by the Manitoba Act) might be a threat to the rule of law. This would render Manitoba nearly lawless, and the principle of the rule of law was defined as meaning no one is above the law and that laws must exist, as they uphold society's values. The court therefore confirmed the Charter's preamble's importance by stating, "The constitutional status of the rule of law is beyond question." Consequently, some time was given before the unconstitutional laws would expire.

In Re BC Motor Vehicle Act (1985), the Supreme Court also linked the rule of law to the principles of fundamental justice, as illustrated by sections 8 to 14 of the Charter. The court noted the importance of these rights to the justice system, stating that sections 8 to 14 "have been recognized as essential elements of a system for the administration of justice which is founded upon a belief in 'the dignity and worth of the human person' (preamble to the Canadian Bill of Rights, R.S.C. 1970, App. III) and on "the rule of law" (preamble to the Canadian Charter of Rights and Freedoms)."

=== Alternate interpretations ===
Some theologians and philosophers have questioned whether the preamble refers to a specific God (the Christian God or Jewish God) or to a more abstract concept that promotes civic virtue (i.e., civil religion). For instance, Paul Russell has stated that "The basic problem with the God-clause is that it runs into an impossible dilemma, given the actual content of the Charter itself. More specifically, what it claims is either meaningless (and therefore worthless), or it has real meaning, in which case it strikes a blow against the very principles that the Charter is in place to protect (in which case it is pernicious)". In R v Big M Drug Mart Ltd, a dissenting judge on the Alberta Court of Appeal, Justice Belzil, wrote that the preamble to the Charter indicated Canada had a Christian heritage and thus courts should not use the section 2 right to freedom of religion to eliminate traditions of this heritage.

== History ==
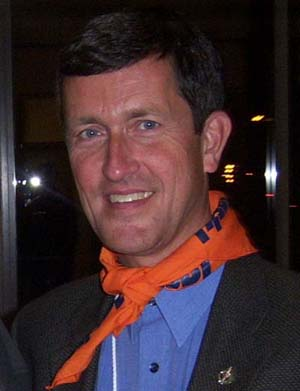
New Democratic MP Svend Robinson has opposed the preamble's mention of God.

After one version of the Charter drawn in June 1980 that lasted until September, which said in its preamble that Canadians "shall always be, with the help of God, a free and self-governing people", the Charter was not going to have a preamble. The current preamble only first appeared in the April 1981 draft, which came relatively late in the process. It was included despite the fact there was no call for the Charter to have a preamble by the Special Joint Committee which was reviewing the Constitution, and that according to George Egerton, then Prime Minister Pierre Trudeau, called it "strange" that some of his colleagues wanted God referenced in the Charter. (Trudeau told his MPs, "I don't think God gives a damn whether he's in the constitution or not.") However, there were various religious and Conservative criticisms of the Charter during its drafting, with fears that denominational schools and Canada's abortion law were threatened. Also at this time, religious groups in Canada such as "100 Huntley Street" and the Evangelical Fellowship of Canada were growing and wanted God acknowledged in the Constitution. Despite the Liberal Party of Canada's protests that a better preamble could be written after patriation was achieved and that therefore there was no need for the preamble being proposed at the time by the Conservatives, religious groups increased their activism. Trudeau's justice minister, Jean Chrétien, said it was the top issue in all of the letters the government was sent during patriation.

The preamble has been politically controversial: in 1999, New Democratic MP Svend Robinson, presented a petition created by members of Humanist Canada in the House of Commons that the reference to God be struck from the preamble, citing concerns about Canada's diversity and those Canadians who did not believe in God. The proposal was controversial and the party responded by undermining Robinson's responsibilities and his position in the caucus.

== Societal impact ==
The preamble has proved valuable to some groups and political parties. The Christian Heritage Party of Canada, for example, quoted the preamble on the main page of their website, and the party called itself "Canada's only pro-Life, pro-family federal political party, and the only federal party that endorses the principles of the Preamble to the Charter of Rights and Freedoms". The words "principles that recognize the supremacy of God and the rule of law" also appear in the party's official policies regarding what they feel all laws should be based upon, and the party states, "'Human rights' as expressed in the Canadian Charter of Rights and Freedoms can only, therefore, be legitimately interpreted in light of, or in conjunction with, the higher Moral Law of God."

== See also ==
- Preamble to the 1997 Constitution of Fiji
- Preamble to the United Nations Charter
- Preamble to the United States Constitution
