= Preamble to the Albanian Constitution =

The Preamble to the Albanian Constitution is a brief introductory statement of the Constitution's fundamental purposes and guiding principles. It states in general terms the will of the Albanian people to establish a new constitution based on universal values of freedom, respect for human rights, tolerance, coexistence and the determination to build a prosperous society that abides by the laws and regulations henceforth put in place.

== Preamble ==
We, the people of Albania, proud and aware of our history, with responsibility for the future, and with faith in God and/or other universal values, with determination to build a social and democratic state based on the rule of law, and to guarantee the fundamental human rights and freedoms, with a spirit of religious coexistence and tolerance, with a pledge to protect human dignity and personhood, as well as for the prosperity of the whole nation, for peace, well-being, culture and social solidarity, with the centuries-old aspiration of the Albanian people for national identity and unity, with a deep conviction that justice, peace, harmony and cooperation between nations are among the highest values of humanity,

We establish this Constitution:
