= Preamble to the 1997 Constitution of Fiji =

The 1997 Constitution of Fiji begins with a Preamble, which sets out the historical, cultural, and political reasons for the drafting of the 1997 Constitution.

The writing of the Preamble was a careful balancing act. Fijian society has often been culturally, economically, and politically polarized in recent decades between ethnic Fijians and Indo-Fijians, who are descendants of migrants brought to work the British-owned sugar plantations between 1879 and 1916. The framers of the Constitution wanted the Preamble to acknowledge the unique place of indigenous Fijians and Rotumans, whilst at the same time affirming the equal value to the country of Indo-Fijians and other minorities.

The Preamble recalls "the events in our history that have made us what we are." It begins by asking for the continued blessing of God "who has always watched over these islands", and goes on to acknowledge the strong Christian tradition of the Fijian people, dating from "their conversion from heathenism through the power of the name of Jesus Christ" and speaks of the "enduring influence" of the Christian faith in Fiji today. Mindful, however, of Fiji's complex history of immigration which has resulted in the multicultural nature of the Fijian nation today, the Preamble also acknowledges the "contribution ... of other faiths, to the spiritual life of Fiji."

The Preamble traces Fiji's constitutional history, from its settlement by the ancestors of the Fijian and Rotuman peoples and the subsequent arrival of numerous different peoples, through the decision of Ratu Seru Epenisa Cakobau, the King who had united all of Fiji's tribes under his leadership in 1871, and his subsequent decision to cede the country to Great Britain on 10 October 1874, and the later decision of the Rotuman chiefs to cede Rotuma in November 1879, to the gaining of independence from the United Kingdom and the adoption of the first constitution in 1970, the abrogation of that constitution in 1987, and the subsequent proclamation of the Sovereign Democratic Republic of Fiji and the promulgation of a republican constitution by the President, Ratu Sir Penaia Ganilau, in 1990, and the subsequent constitutional review undertaken in the mid-1990s, leading to the adoption of the present document. The Preamble sees an unbroken continuity connecting all of these historical events that have left their mark on Fiji's constitutional history.

The Preamble goes on to recognize that "all those who chose to make their homes in these islands form our multicultural society," and recognizes the value and worth of the diverse faiths, traditions, languages, and cultures of the various ethnic components of Fiji's society. Pride is expressed in the common citizenship, institutions, and development of Fiji's people groups. The preamble ends with a new commitment, "with God as our witness," to live in harmony and unity, promote social justice, further economic and social development benefiting all communities, protect human rights and uphold the rule of law, and safeguard the importance of the family unit.
