= Preamble =

Introductory section of a document which states its purpose and philosophy

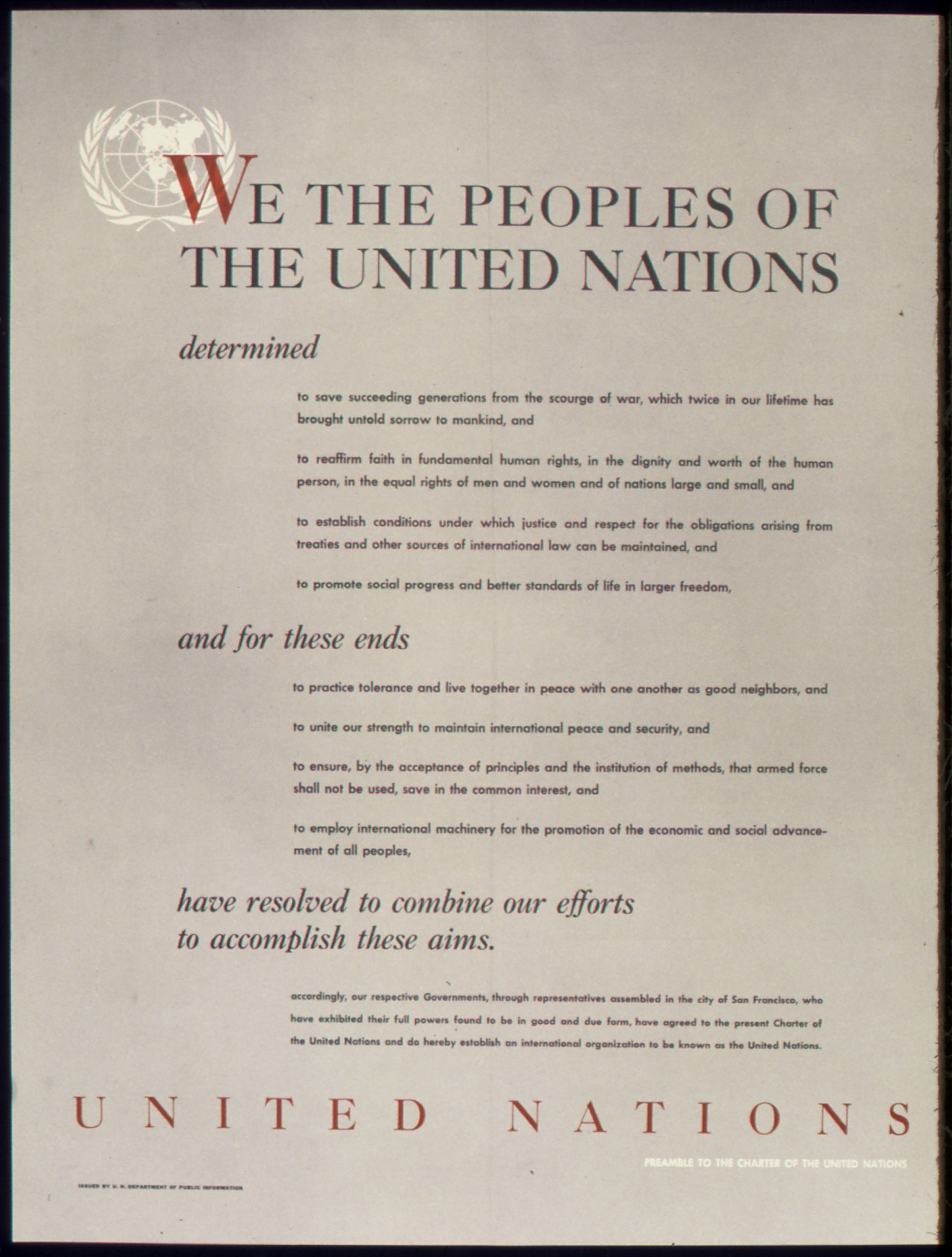
The preamble to the United Nations Charter

A preamble (from Latin preambulum 'preliminary, preface') is an introductory and expressionary statement in a document that explains the document's purpose and underlying philosophy. When applied to the opening paragraphs of a statute, it may recite historical facts pertinent to the subject of the statute. It is distinct from the long title or enacting formula of a law.

In the American context of parliamentary procedure, according to Robert's Rules of Order, a preamble consists of "Whereas" clauses that are placed before the resolving clauses in a resolution (formal written motion). However, preambles are not required to be placed in resolutions. According to Robert's Rules of Order, including such background information may not be helpful in passing the resolution.

== Legal effect ==
While preambles may be regarded as unimportant introductory matter, their words may have effects that may not have been foreseen by their drafters.

=== Australia ===
In Australia in 1999, a referendum on whether to adopt a new preamble was accompanied by a promise that the preamble, if adopted, could not be enforceable by the courts, as some were worried with how the preamble could be interpreted and applied.

=== Bosnia and Herzegovina ===
The Bosnian Constitutional Court, particularly citing the case law of the Supreme Court of Canada, also declared that the provisions of the preamble of the Bosnian Constitution are invested with a normative force thereby serving as a sound standard of judicial review for the Constitutional Court.

=== Canada ===
In Canada, the preamble to the Constitution Act, 1867 was cited by the Supreme Court of Canada in the Provincial Judges Reference, to increase guarantees to judicial independence.

=== European Union ===
Due to concern over its potential effects, the draft preamble of the proposed European Constitution, in 2002, caused much controversy because of the possible inclusion of a reference to the Christian heritage of Europe.

=== France ===
In France, the preamble to the constitution of the Fifth Republic of 1958 was considered ancillary and therefore non-binding until a major jurisprudential reversal by the Constitutional Council in the decision of 16 July 1971. This decision, which began with the words "Having regard to the constitution and its preamble," effected a considerable change in French constitutional law, as the preamble and the texts it referred to, the Declaration of the Rights of Man and of the Citizen of 1789 and the preamble to the constitution of the Fourth Republic, took their place alongside the constitution proper as texts understood as being invested with constitutional value. The Charter of the Environment of 2004 was later appended to the preamble, and the Constitutional Council identified three informal categories consisting of the fundamental principles recognized by the laws of the Republic, the principles of constitutional value, and the objectives of constitutional value.

=== India ===
The preamble to the Constitution of India

The Preamble to the Constitution of India is based on the Objectives Resolution, which was moved in the Constituent Assembly by Jawaharlal Nehru on 13 December 1946, accepted on 22 January 1947, and adopted on 26 November 1949, and came into force on 26 January 1950, celebrated as the Republic Day of India.

=== Ireland ===
The preamble to the Constitution of Ireland has been cited by the Supreme Court in numerous cases, including McGee v The Attorney General (1974), Norris v. Attorney General (1984), and Attorney General v X (1992). The 1996 report of the Constitution Review Group recommended amending the preamble to make it non-justiciable and removing language with Christian invocations and allusions to nationalist historiography which might alienate the state's unionists and non-Christians.

== See also ==
- Preamble and Title 1 of the Swiss Federal Constitution
- Preamble to the 1987 Constitution of the Philippines
- Preamble to the 1997 Constitution of Fiji
- Preamble to the Albanian Constitution
- Preamble to the Canadian Charter of Rights and Freedoms
- Preamble to the Constitution of India
- Preamble to the United Nations Charter
- Preamble to the United States Constitution
