= St. Sylvestre =

St. Sylvester can refer to:

- Saint Sylvester (disambiguation)
- Saint-Sylvestre (disambiguation)

== See also ==
- San Silvestre (disambiguation)
- San Silvestro (disambiguation)
- Sylvester
- Sylvestre (disambiguation)
