= Sylvester (disambiguation) =

Sylvester or Silvester is a given name and a surname.

Sylvester may also refer to:

== Arts and entertainment ==
- Sylvester (film), a 1985 film starring Richard Farnsworth
- New Year's Eve (1924 film) or Sylvester, a German film by Lupu Pick
- Sylvester, or the Wicked Uncle, a novel by Georgette Heyer
- Sylvester (singer), singer and disco performer Sylvester James Jr. (1947–1988)

== Places ==
- Lake Sylvester System, Australia
- Sylvester, Nova Scotia, Canada
- Mount Sylvester, Canada
- Sylvester, Georgia, United States
- Sylvester, Texas, United States
- Sylvester, West Virginia, United States
- Sylvester, Wisconsin, United States
- Sylvester (crater), a crater on the Moon

== Other uses ==
- Silvester baronets
- Euploea sylvester, a butterfly species
- Sylvester, a device for safely removing pit props in mines, invented by Walter Sylvester

== See also ==
- Sylvester's criterion, to determine whether a Hermitian matrix is positive-definite
- Felis silvestris or wildcat
- Saint Sylvester (disambiguation)
- St. Silvester, Fribourg, Switzerland
- Saint-Sylvestre (disambiguation)
- Silvester
- Silvestre
- Silvesterklaus
- Sylvestre (disambiguation)
- Sylwester
