= Fagel =

Fagel is a Dutch language surname belonging to the noble Fagel family. Notable people with the name include:

- François Nicolas Fagel (1655–1718), Dutch general
- Gaspar Fagel (1634–1688), Dutch politician, jurist, and diplomat
- Léon Fagel (1851–1913), French sculptor
- Rick Fagel (born 1953), American tennis player
