= G. sylvestre =

G. sylvestre may refer to:

- Galium sylvestre, a synonym for Galium album, a plant species native to Europe
- Gymnema sylvestre, a herb species native to the tropical forests of southern and central India

== See also ==
- Sylvestre (disambiguation)
