= Tentlingen =

- Municipality
- Coat of arms
- Location of Tentlingen
- Location within Switzerland Location within Canton of Fribourg
- Coordinates: 46°46′N 7°12′E
- Country: Switzerland
- Canton: Fribourg
- District: Sense

Government
  - Mayor: Gemeindeammann

Area
  - Total: 3.69 km^{2} (1.42 sq mi)
- Elevation: 728 m (2,388 ft)

Population (December 2020)
  - Total: 1,348
  - Density: 365/km^{2} (946/sq mi)
- Time zone: UTC+01:00 (CET)
  - Summer (DST): UTC+02:00 (CEST)
- Postal code: 1734
- SFOS number: 2307
- ISO 3166 code: CH-FR
- Surrounded by: Giffers, Le Mouret, Pierrafortscha, Rechthalten, Sankt Silvester, Sankt Ursen, Villarsel-sur-Marly
- Website: www.tentlingen.ch

Tentlingen (French: Tinterin; Arpitan: Tenterens [tɛ̃təˈʁɛ̃]) is a municipality in the district of Sense in the canton of Fribourg in Switzerland. It is one of the municipalities with a large majority of German speakers in the mostly French speaking Canton of Fribourg.

== History ==
Aerial view (1967)

Tentlingen is first mentioned around 1201–1212 as Tentenens.

== Geography ==
Tentlingen has an area of 3.61 km^{2} (1.39 sq mi). Of this area, 2.44 km^{2} (0.94 mi^{2}) or 67.6% is used for agricultural purposes, while 0.58 km^{2} (0.22 mi^{2}) or 16.1% is forested. Of the rest of the land, 0.57 km^{2} (0.22 mi^{2}) or 15.8% is settled (buildings or roads), 0.1 km^{2} (25 acres) or 2.8% is either rivers or lakes.

Of the built up area, industrial buildings made up 1.7% of the total area while housing and buildings made up 9.4% and transportation infrastructure made up 3.6%. Power and water infrastructure as well as other special developed areas made up 1.1% of the area Out of the forested land, 14.4% of the total land area is heavily forested and 1.7% is covered with orchards or small clusters of trees. Of the agricultural land, 38.2% is used for growing crops and 27.1% is pastures, while 2.2% is used for orchards or vine crops. All the water in the municipality is flowing water.

The municipality is located in the Sense district, above the Ärgera/Gérine canyon and south-east of Fribourg. It consists of the linear village of Tentlingen.

== Coat of arms ==
The blazon of the municipal coat of arms is Per saltire Argent and Gules overall in chief a Yoke Or.

== Demographics ==
Tentlingen has a population (as of December 2020) of 1,348. As of 2008, 7.2% of the population are resident foreign nationals. Over the last 10 years (2000–2010) the population has changed at a rate of 7.8%. Migration accounted for 2%, while births and deaths accounted for 3.3%.

Most of the population (as of 2000) speaks German (998 or 87.0%) as their first language, French is the second most common (112 or 9.8%) and Albanian is the third (13 or 1.1%). There are 2 people who speak Italian.

As of 2008, the population was 51.2% male and 48.8% female. The population was made up of 572 Swiss men (47.4% of the population) and 45 (3.7%) non-Swiss men. There were 547 Swiss women (45.4%) and 42 (3.5%) non-Swiss women. Of the population in the municipality, 383 or about 33.4% were born in Tentlingen and lived there in 2000. There were 525 or 45.8% who were born in the same canton, while 123 or 10.7% were born somewhere else in Switzerland, and 77 or 6.7% were born outside of Switzerland.

As of 2000, children and teenagers (0–19 years old) make up 27.4% of the population, while adults (20–64 years old) make up 63.5% and seniors (over 64 years old) make up 9.2%.

As of 2000, there were 505 people who were single and never married in the municipality. There were 562 married individuals, 49 widows or widowers and 31 individuals who are divorced.

As of 2000, there were 425 private households in the municipality, and an average of 2.6 persons per household. There were 101 households that consist of only one person and 37 households with five or more people. In 2000, a total of 405 apartments (95.5% of the total) were permanently occupied, while 10 apartments (2.4%) were seasonally occupied and 9 apartments (2.1%) were empty. The vacancy rate for the municipality, in 2010, was 0.61%.

The historical population is given in the following chart:

== Politics ==
In the 2011 federal election the most popular party was the SVP which received 25.2% of the vote. The next three most popular parties were the CVP (18.5%), the FDP (17.7%) and the SPS (15.9%).

The SVP improved their position in Tentlingen rising to first, from second in 2007 (with 21.9%) The CVP moved from third in 2007 (with 20.6%) to second in 2011, the FDP moved from first in 2007 (with 25.6%) to third and the SPS moved from below fourth place in 2007 to fourth. A total of 455 votes were cast in this election, of which 5 or 1.1% were invalid.

== Economy ==
As of 2010, Tentlingen had an unemployment rate of 2%. As of 2008, there were 30 people employed in the primary economic sector and about 16 businesses involved in this sector. 117 people were employed in the secondary sector and there were 14 businesses in this sector. 156 people were employed in the tertiary sector, with 18 businesses in this sector. There were 589 residents of the municipality who were employed in some capacity, of which females made up 40.1% of the workforce.

In 2008 the total number of full-time equivalent jobs was 250. The number of jobs in the primary sector was 19, all of which were in agriculture. The number of jobs in the secondary sector was 106 of which 89 or (84.0%) were in manufacturing and 17 (16.0%) were in construction. The number of jobs in the tertiary sector was 125. In the tertiary sector; 42 or 33.6% were in wholesale or retail sales or the repair of motor vehicles, 5 or 4.0% were in a hotel or restaurant, 5 or 4.0% were technical professionals or scientists, and 69 or 55.2% were in health care.

In 2000, there were 175 workers who commuted into the municipality and 467 workers who commuted away. The municipality is a net exporter of workers, with about 2.7 workers leaving the municipality for every one entering. Of the working population, 11.5% used public transportation to get to work, and 70.8% used a private car.

== Religion ==
From the 2000 census, 946 or 82.5% were Roman Catholic, while 98 or 8.5% belonged to the Swiss Reformed Church. Of the rest of the population, there were 2 members of an Orthodox church (or about 0.17% of the population), there was 1 individual who belongs to the Christian Catholic Church, and there were 26 individuals (or about 2.27% of the population) who belonged to another Christian church. There were 24 (or about 2.09% of the population) who were Islamic. There were 1 individual who belonged to another church. 28 (or about 2.44% of the population) belonged to no church, are agnostic or atheist, and 33 individuals (or about 2.88% of the population) did not answer the question.

== Education ==
In Tentlingen about 405 or (35.3%) of the population have completed non-mandatory upper secondary education, and 104 or (9.1%) have completed additional higher education (either university or a Fachhochschule). Of the 104 who completed tertiary schooling, 71.2% were Swiss men, 16.3% were Swiss women, 9.6% were non-Swiss men.

The Canton of Fribourg school system provides one year of non-obligatory Kindergarten, followed by six years of Primary school. This is followed by three years of obligatory lower Secondary school where the students are separated according to ability and aptitude. Following the lower Secondary students may attend a three or four year optional upper Secondary school. The upper Secondary school is divided into gymnasium (university preparatory) and vocational programs. After they finish the upper Secondary program, students may choose to attend a Tertiary school or continue their apprenticeship.

During the 2010–11 school year, there were no students attending school in Tentlingen, but a total of 212 students attended school in other municipalities. Of these students, 13 were in kindergarten, 85 were in a primary school, 55 were in a mandatory secondary school, 17 were in an upper secondary school and 33 were in a vocational secondary program. There were a total of 9 tertiary students from Tentlingen.

As of 2000, there were 189 students from Tentlingen who attended schools outside the municipality.
