= Pascal Jenny =

Swiss footballer (born 1978)

Personal information
- Full name: Pascal Jenny
- Date of birth: 6 July 1978 (age 48)
- Place of birth: Brünisried
- Height: 1.71 m (5 ft 7 in)
- Position: Defender

Team information
- Current team: Neuchâtel Xamax
- Number: 16

Senior career*
Years	Team	Apps	(Gls)
1996–1997	Servette FC	11	(0)
1998	FC Winterthur	12	(1)
1998–2001	Yverdon-Sport	100	(7)
2001–2005	FC St. Gallen	124	(5)
2005–2007	Yverdon-Sport	66	(1)
2007–2008	Neuchâtel Xamax	25	(0)
2008–2009	FC Fribourg	27	(1)
2009–2014	SC Düdingen	104	(2)
- * Club domestic league appearances and goals as of 12 February 2020

Pascal Jenny (born 6 July 1978) is a former Swiss football defender.

== Career ==
He currently plays for SC Düdingen in the First Division. Jenny previously played in the Swiss Super League for Servette FC, FC Winterthur, Yverdon-Sport, FC St. Gallen and Neuchâtel Xamax.
