= Brünisried =

- Municipality
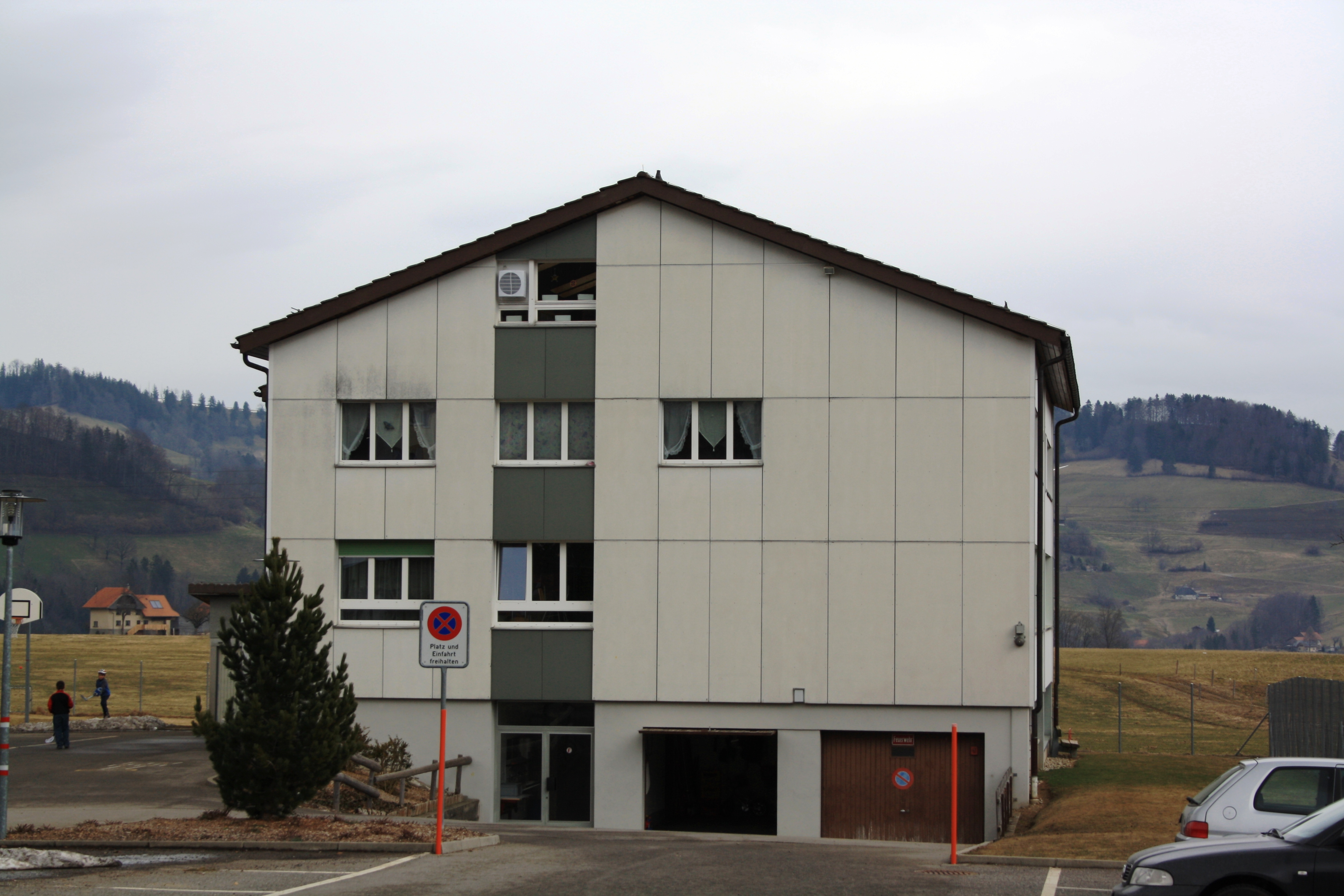
- Brünisried village administration building

- Flag Coat of arms
- Location of Brünisried
- Location within Switzerland Location within Canton of Fribourg
- Coordinates: 46°46′N 7°17′E
- Country: Switzerland
- Canton: Fribourg
- District: Sense

Government
  - Mayor: Gemeindeammann

Area
  - Total: 3.24 km^{2} (1.25 sq mi)
- Elevation: 875 m (2,871 ft)

Population (2020)
  - Total: 670
  - Density: 210/km^{2} (540/sq mi)
- Time zone: UTC+01:00 (CET)
  - Summer (DST): UTC+02:00 (CEST)
- Postal code: 1719
- SFOS number: 2292
- ISO 3166 code: CH-FR
- Surrounded by: Alterswil, Plaffeien, Rechthalten, Sankt Ursen
- Website: https://www.bruenisried.ch SFSO statistics

Brünisried is a municipality in the district of Sense in the canton of Fribourg in Switzerland. It is one of the municipalities with a large majority of German speakers in the mostly French speaking Canton of Fribourg.

== History ==
Brünisried is first mentioned in 1294 as Brunisriet.

== Geography ==
Brünisried has an area of 3.25 km^{2} (1.25 sq mi). Of this area, 2.35 km^{2} (0.91 mi^{2}) or 72.3% is used for agricultural purposes, while 0.62 km^{2} (0.24 mi^{2}) or 19.1% is forested. Of the rest of the land, 0.27 km^{2} (0.10 mi^{2}) or 8.3% is settled (buildings or roads).

Of the built up area, housing and buildings made up 6.2% and transportation infrastructure made up 0.9%. Out of the forested land, all of the forested land area is covered with heavy forests. Of the agricultural land, 14.2% is used for growing crops and 56.3% is pastures, while 1.8% is used for orchards or vine crops.

The municipality is located in the Sense district, about 12 km (7.5 mi) south-east of Fribourg. It consists of the linear village of Brünisried and the hamlets of Berg, Holzgassa and Menzisberg.

== Coat of arms ==
The blazon of the municipal coat of arms is Gules a Fencing Board Or charged with a Sword Sable

== Demographics ==
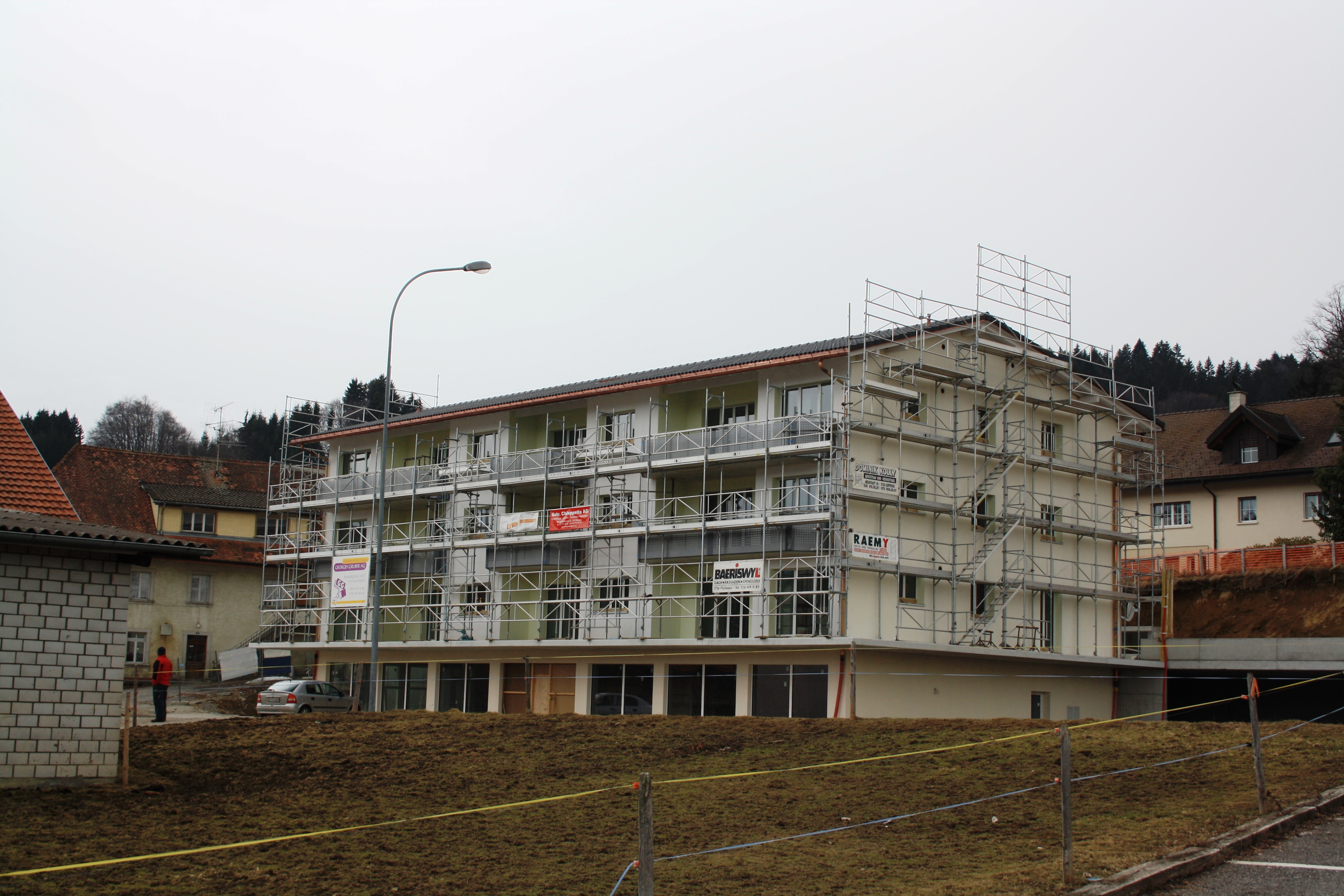
New construction in Brünisried

Brünisried has a population (as of December 2020) of 670. As of 2008, 1.3% of the population are resident foreign nationals. Over the last 10 years (2000–2010) the population has changed at a rate of 6.3%. Migration accounted for 3.2%, while births and deaths accounted for 2.2%.

Most of the population (as of 2000) speaks German (552 or 98.4%) as their first language, French is the second most common (6 or 1.1%) and Albanian is the third (3 or 0.5%).

As of 2008, the population was 51.8% male and 48.2% female. The population was made up of 318 Swiss men (51.0% of the population) and 5 (0.8%) non-Swiss men. There were 299 Swiss women (47.9%) and 2 (0.3%) non-Swiss women. Of the population in the municipality, 222 or about 39.6% were born in Brünisried and lived there in 2000. There were 250 or 44.6% who were born in the same canton, while 65 or 11.6% were born somewhere else in Switzerland, and 13 or 2.3% were born outside of Switzerland.

As of 2000, children and teenagers (0–19 years old) make up 24.8% of the population, while adults (20–64 years old) make up 60.8% and seniors (over 64 years old) make up 14.4%.

As of 2000, there were 236 people who were single and never married in the municipality. There were 274 married individuals, 32 widows or widowers and 19 individuals who are divorced.

As of 2000, there were 210 private households in the municipality, and an average of 2.6 persons per household. There were 60 households that consist of only one person and 22 households with five or more people. In 2000, a total of 192 apartments (87.3% of the total) were permanently occupied, while 22 apartments (10.0%) were seasonally occupied and 6 apartments (2.7%) were empty. As of 2009, the construction rate of new housing units was 6.4 new units per 1000 residents. The vacancy rate for the municipality, in 2010, was 2.35%.

The historical population is given in the following chart:

== Politics ==
In the 2011 federal election the most popular party was the SVP which received 33.2% of the vote. The next three most popular parties were the SPS (18.2%), the CVP (17.5%) and the FDP (11.1%).

The SVP received about the same percentage of the vote as they did in the 2007 Federal election (36.9% in 2007 vs 33.2% in 2011). The SPS moved from third in 2007 (with 13.9%) to second in 2011, the CVP moved from second in 2007 (with 15.9%) to third and the FDP moved from below fourth place in 2007 to fourth. A total of 237 votes were cast in this election, of which 6 or 2.5% were invalid.

== Economy ==
As of 2010, Brünisried had an unemployment rate of 1%. As of 2008, there were 32 people employed in the primary economic sector and about 17 businesses involved in this sector. 16 people were employed in the secondary sector and there were 6 businesses in this sector. 24 people were employed in the tertiary sector, with 8 businesses in this sector. There were 295 residents of the municipality who were employed in some capacity, of which females made up 38.3% of the workforce.

In 2008 the total number of full-time equivalent jobs was 52. The number of jobs in the primary sector was 19, all of which were in agriculture. The number of jobs in the secondary sector was 15 of which 1 was in manufacturing and 14 (93.3%) were in construction. The number of jobs in the tertiary sector was 18. In the tertiary sector; 8 or 44.4% were in wholesale or retail sales or the repair of motor vehicles, 1 was in the movement and storage of goods, 1 was in a hotel or restaurant, 3 or 16.7% were in the information industry, 3 or 16.7% were in education.

In 2000, there were 38 workers who commuted into the municipality and 239 workers who commuted away. The municipality is a net exporter of workers, with about 6.3 workers leaving the municipality for every one entering. Of the working population, 8.8% used public transportation to get to work, and 75.6% used a private car.

== Religion ==
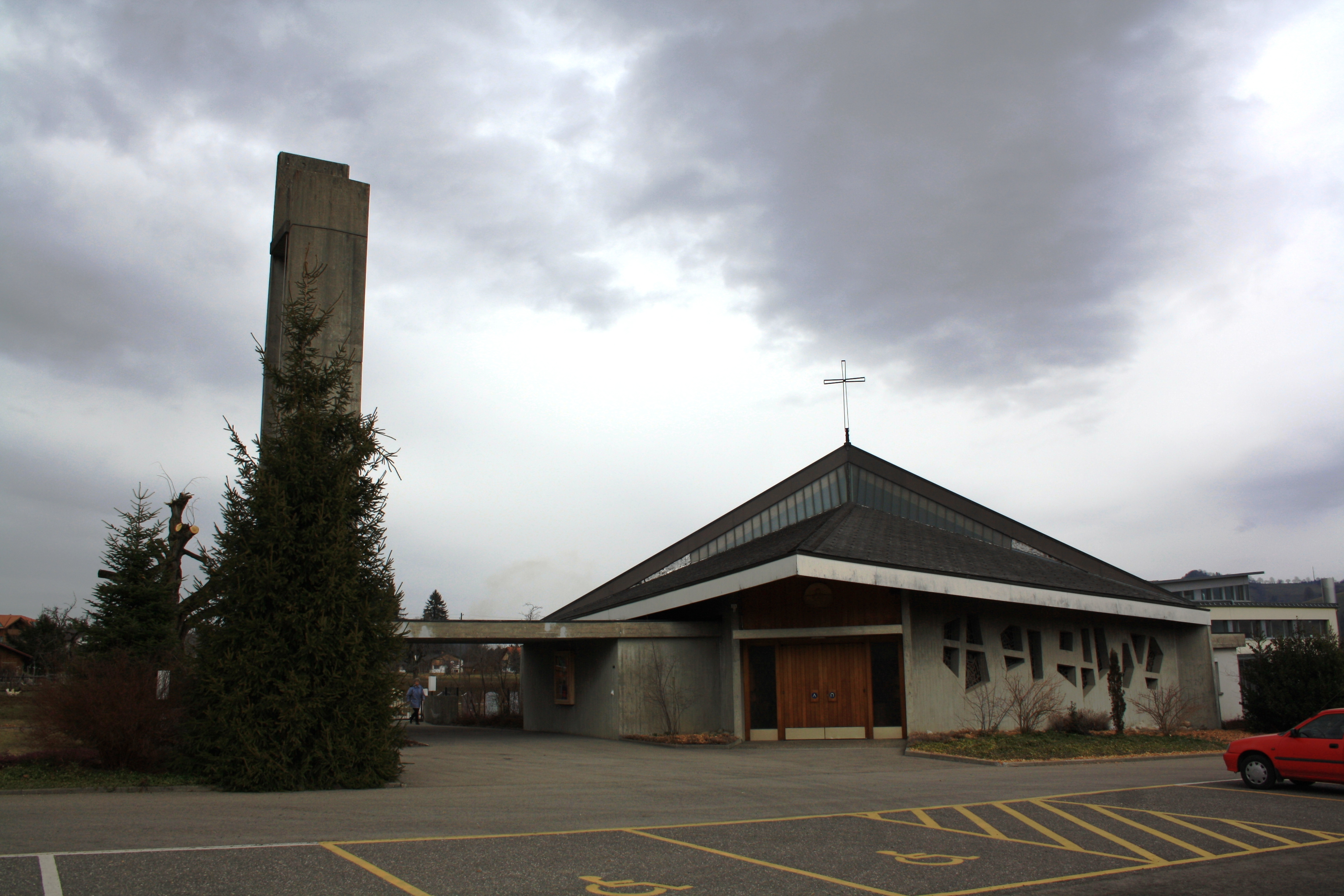
Roman Catholic church in Brünisried

From the 2000 census, 431 or 76.8% were Roman Catholic, while 92 or 16.4% belonged to the Swiss Reformed Church. Of the rest of the population, there was 1 individual who belongs to another Christian church. There were 7 (or about 1.25% of the population) who were Islamic. 20 (or about 3.57% of the population) belonged to no church, are agnostic or atheist, and 10 individuals (or about 1.78% of the population) did not answer the question.

== Education ==
In Brünisried about 198 or (35.3%) of the population have completed non-mandatory upper secondary education, and 38 or (6.8%) have completed additional higher education (either university or a Fachhochschule). Of the 38 who completed tertiary schooling, 78.9% were Swiss men, 21.1% were Swiss women.

The Canton of Fribourg school system provides one year of non-obligatory Kindergarten, followed by six years of Primary school. This is followed by three years of obligatory lower Secondary school where the students are separated according to ability and aptitude. Following the lower Secondary students may attend a three or four year optional upper Secondary school. The upper Secondary school is divided into gymnasium (university preparatory) and vocational programs. After they finish the upper Secondary program, students may choose to attend a Tertiary school or continue their apprenticeship.

During the 2010-11 school year, there were a total of 44 students attending 3 classes in Brünisried. A total of 102 students from the municipality attended any school, either in the municipality or outside of it. There were no kindergarten classes in the municipality, but 13 students attended kindergarten in a neighboring municipality. The municipality had 3 primary classes and 44 students. During the same year, there were no lower secondary classes in the municipality, but 26 students attended lower secondary school in a neighboring municipality. There were no upper Secondary classes or vocational classes, but there were 7 upper Secondary students and 18 upper Secondary vocational students who attended classes in another municipality. The municipality had no non-university Tertiary classes. who attended classes in another municipality.

As of 2000, there were 2 students in Brünisried who came from another municipality, while 37 residents attended schools outside the municipality.

== Notable people ==
- Pascal Jenny is a former Swiss football defender.
