= Rechthalten =

- Municipality
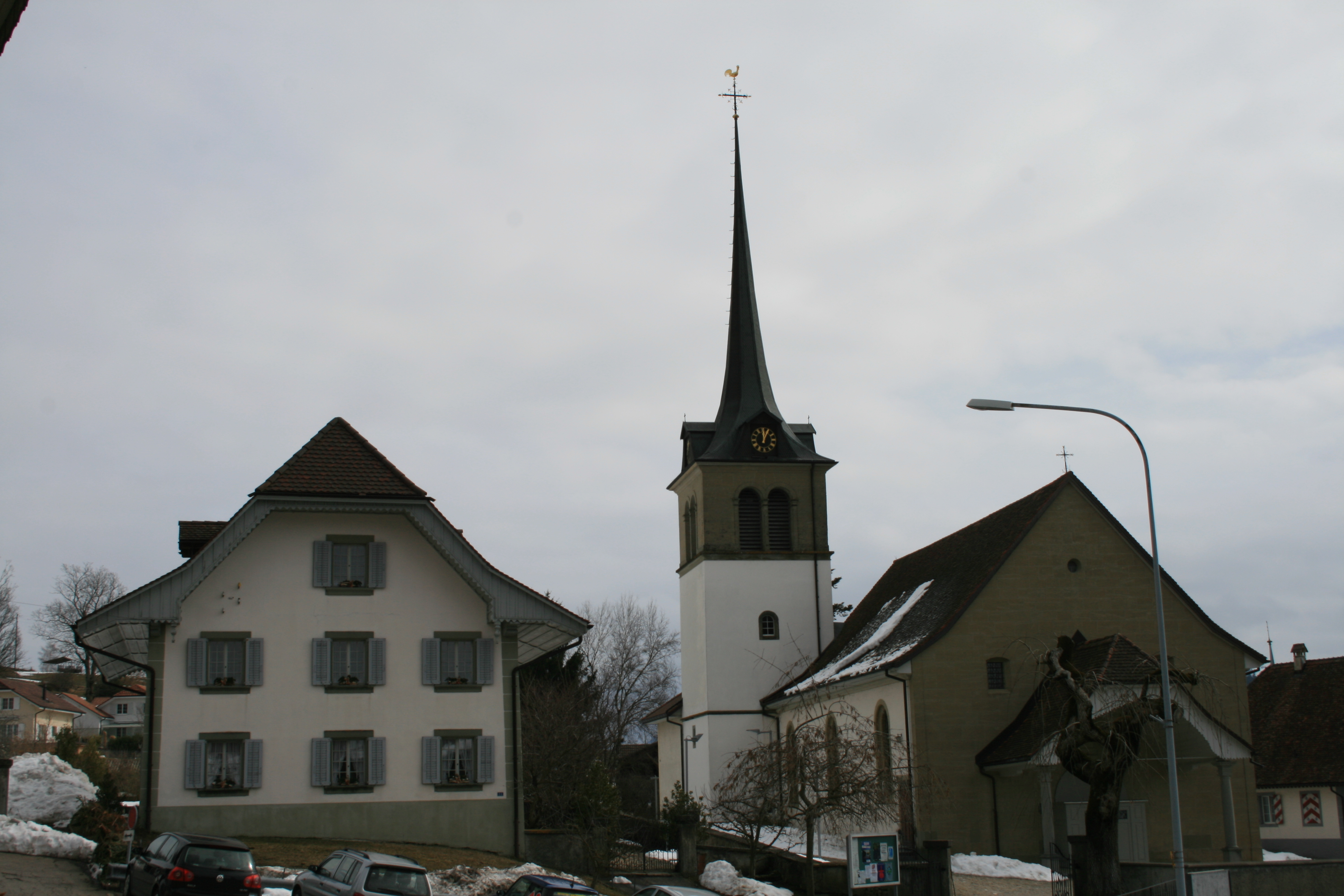
- Roman Catholic church in Rechthalten village

- Flag Coat of arms
- Location of Rechthalten
- Location within Switzerland Location within Canton of Fribourg
- Coordinates: 46°46′N 7°14′E
- Country: Switzerland
- Canton: Fribourg
- District: Sense

Government
  - Mayor: Gemeindeammann

Area
  - Total: 7.3 km^{2} (2.8 sq mi)
- Elevation: 881 m (2,890 ft)

Population (December 2020)
  - Total: 1,106
  - Density: 150/km^{2} (390/sq mi)
- Time zone: UTC+01:00 (CET)
  - Summer (DST): UTC+02:00 (CEST)
- Postal code: 1718
- SFOS number: 2301
- ISO 3166 code: CH-FR
- Surrounded by: Brünisried, Giffers, Plaffeien, Sankt Ursen, Tentlingen
- Website: www.rechthalten.ch

Rechthalten is a municipality in the district of Sense, in the canton of Fribourg in Switzerland. It was known in French as Dirlaret (Arpitan: Drètlarèt [dʁəlaˈʁɛ]), but this name is no longer used. It is one of the municipalities with a large majority of German speakers in the mostly French speaking Canton of Fribourg.

== History ==
Rechthalten is first mentioned in 1142 as Drallaris. In 1173 it was mentioned as de Recto Clivo, followed in 1180 by Dreitlaris and in 1250 it was Rehthalton.

== Geography ==
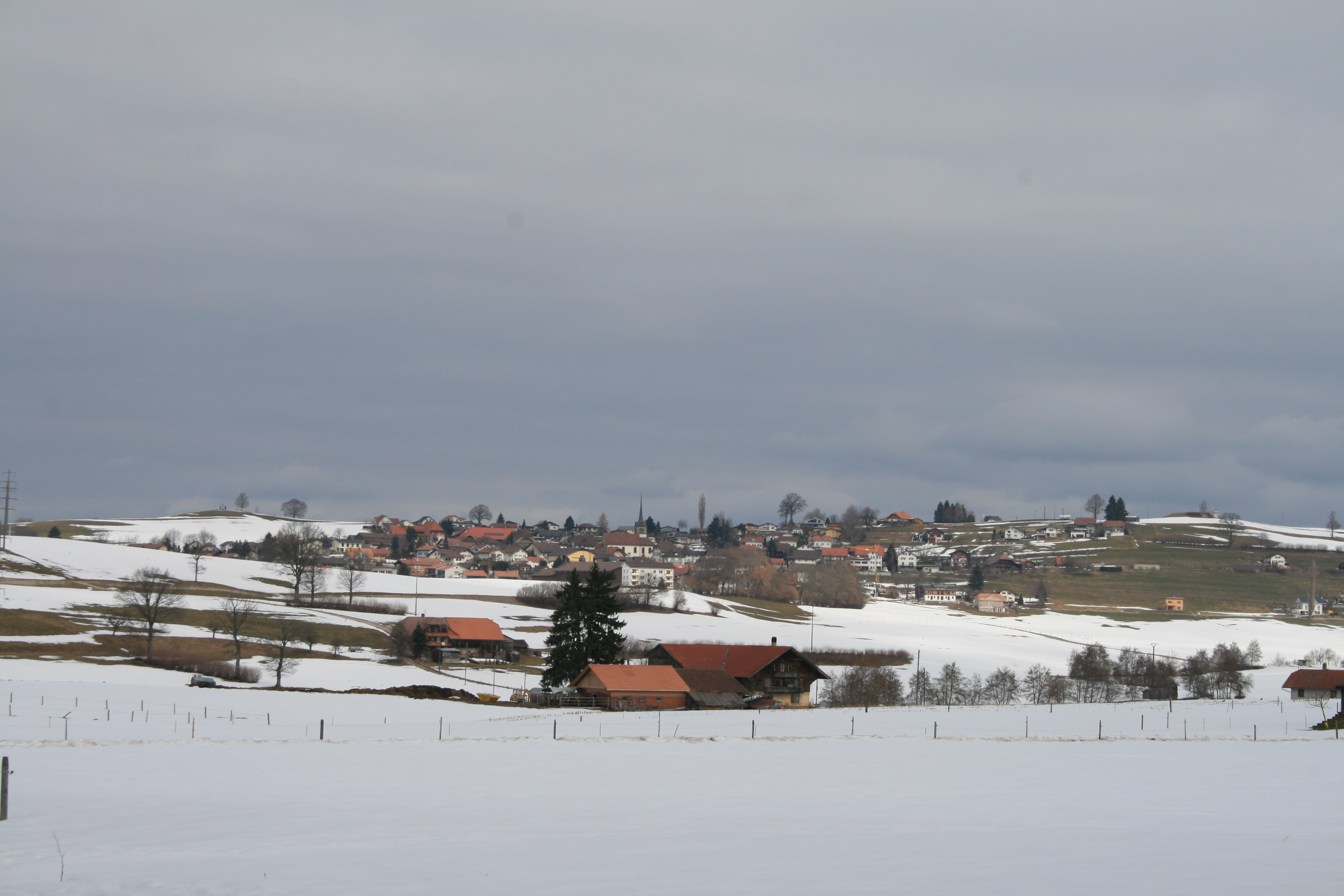
Rechthalten village from the south

Rechthalten has an area of 7.31 km^{2} (2.82 sq mi). Of this area, 5.37 km^{2} (2.07 mi^{2}) or 73.7% is used for agricultural purposes, while 1.33 km^{2} (0.51 mi^{2}) or 18.2% is forested. Of the rest of the land, 0.52 km^{2} (0.20 mi^{2}) or 7.1% is settled (buildings or roads), 0.04 km^{2} (9.9 acres) or 0.5% is either rivers or lakes and 0.04 km^{2} (9.9 acres) or 0.5% is unproductive land.

Of the built up area, housing and buildings made up 4.3% and transportation infrastructure made up 2.2%. Out of the forested land, 17.1% of the total land area is heavily forested and 1.1% is covered with orchards or small clusters of trees. Of the agricultural land, 28.7% is used for growing crops and 44.0% is pastures. All the water in the municipality is flowing water.

The municipality is located in the Sense district, about 8 km (5.0 mi) south-east of Fribourg. It consists of the haufendorf village (an irregular, unplanned and quite closely packed village, built around a central square) of Rechthalten along with scattered hamlets and farm houses.

== Coat of arms ==
The blazon of the municipal coat of arms is Sable on a Pale Argent three Fleurs-de-lys Azure.

== Demographics ==
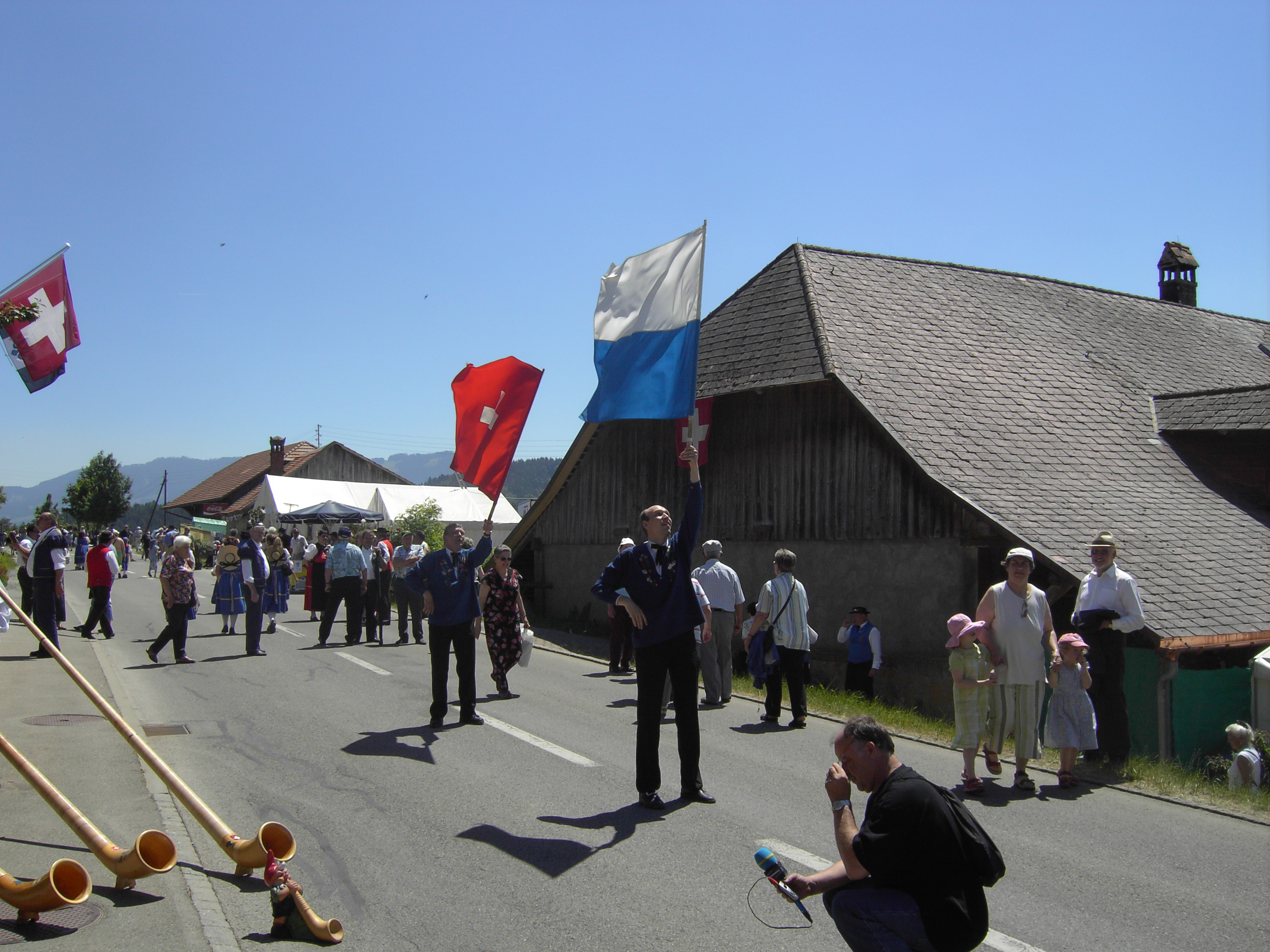
Rechthalten Yodel fest

Rechthalten has a population (as of December 2020) of 1,106. As of 2008, 2.1% of the population are resident foreign nationals. Over the last 10 years (2000–2010) the population has changed at a rate of 7.1%. Migration accounted for 4%, while births and deaths accounted for 4.7%.

Most of the population (as of 2000) speaks German (978 or 95.4%) as their first language, French is the second most common (39 or 3.8%) and Portuguese is the third (3 or 0.3%). There is 1 person who speaks Italian.

As of 2008, the population was 48.9% male and 51.1% female. The population was made up of 516 Swiss men (47.7% of the population) and 13 (1.2%) non-Swiss men. There were 546 Swiss women (50.5%) and 7 (0.6%) non-Swiss women. Of the population in the municipality, 501 or about 48.9% were born in Rechthalten and lived there in 2000. There were 342 or 33.4% who were born in the same canton, while 123 or 12.0% were born somewhere else in Switzerland, and 22 or 2.1% were born outside of Switzerland.

As of 2000, children and teenagers (0–19 years old) make up 22.7% of the population, while adults (20–64 years old) make up 63.7% and seniors (over 64 years old) make up 13.6%.

As of 2000, there were 447 people who were single and never married in the municipality. There were 486 married individuals, 59 widows or widowers and 33 individuals who are divorced.

As of 2000, there were 394 private households in the municipality, and an average of 2.6 persons per household. There were 92 households that consist of only one person and 33 households with five or more people. In 2000, a total of 382 apartments (93.4% of the total) were permanently occupied, while 17 apartments (4.2%) were seasonally occupied and 10 apartments (2.4%) were empty. As of 2009, the construction rate of new housing units was 3.7 new units per 1000 residents. The vacancy rate for the municipality, in 2010, was 0.43%.

The historical population is given in the following chart:

== Politics ==
In the 2011 federal election the most popular party was the SVP which received 30.5% of the vote. The next three most popular parties were the CVP (22.2%), the SPS (15.8%) and the CSP (12.4%).

The SVP gained an additional 7.4% of the vote from the 2007 Federal election (23.1% in 2007 vs 30.5% in 2011). The CVP retained about the same popularity (20.7% in 2007), the SPS moved from below fourth place in 2007 to third and the CSP lost popularity (19.3% in 2007). A total of 412 votes were cast in this election, of which 4 or 1.0% were invalid.

== Economy ==
As of 2010, Rechthalten had an unemployment rate of 1.2%. As of 2008, there were 73 people employed in the primary economic sector and about 32 businesses involved in this sector. 39 people were employed in the secondary sector and there were 10 businesses in this sector. 82 people were employed in the tertiary sector, with 22 businesses in this sector. There were 582 residents of the municipality who were employed in some capacity, of which females made up 40.2% of the workforce.

In 2008 the total number of full-time equivalent jobs was 140. The number of jobs in the primary sector was 49, all of which were in agriculture. The number of jobs in the secondary sector was 33 of which 14 or (42.4%) were in manufacturing and 19 (57.6%) were in construction. The number of jobs in the tertiary sector was 58. In the tertiary sector; 10 or 17.2% were in wholesale or retail sales or the repair of motor vehicles, 4 or 6.9% were in the movement and storage of goods, 13 or 22.4% were in a hotel or restaurant, 1 was in the information industry, 5 or 8.6% were the insurance or financial industry, 3 or 5.2% were technical professionals or scientists, 6 or 10.3% were in education and 2 or 3.4% were in health care.

In 2000, there were 47 workers who commuted into the municipality and 458 workers who commuted away. The municipality is a net exporter of workers, with about 9.7 workers leaving the municipality for every one entering. Of the working population, 8.4% used public transportation to get to work, and 72.7% used a private car.

== Religion ==
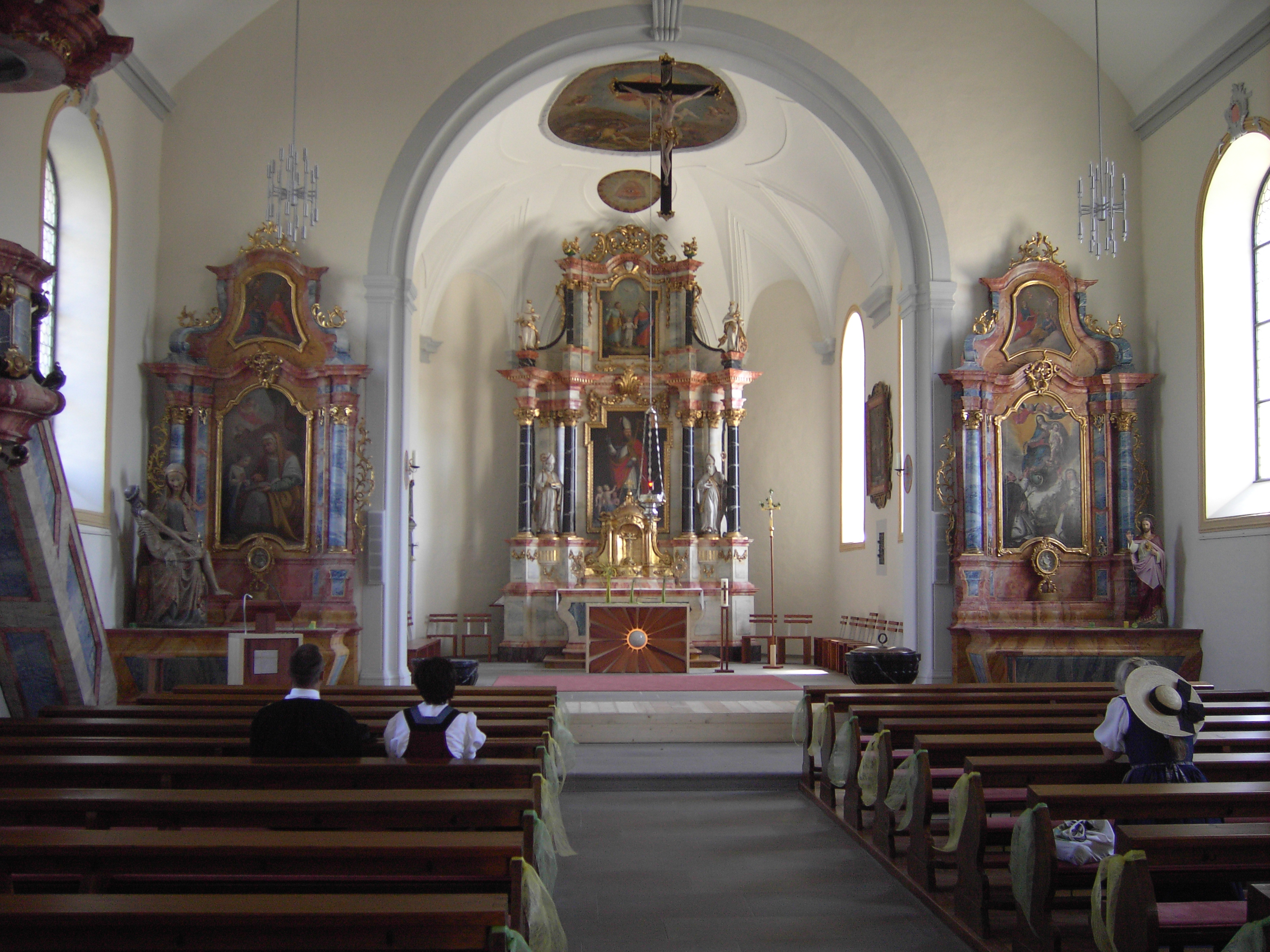
Inside of the Roman Catholic church

From the 2000 census, 823 or 80.3% were Roman Catholic, while 137 or 13.4% belonged to the Swiss Reformed Church. Of the rest of the population, there was 1 member of an Orthodox church, there was 1 individual who belongs to the Christian Catholic Church, and there was 1 individual who belongs to another Christian church. There was 1 individual who was Islamic. 29 (or about 2.83% of the population) belonged to no church, are agnostic or atheist, and 32 individuals (or about 3.12% of the population) did not answer the question.

== Education ==
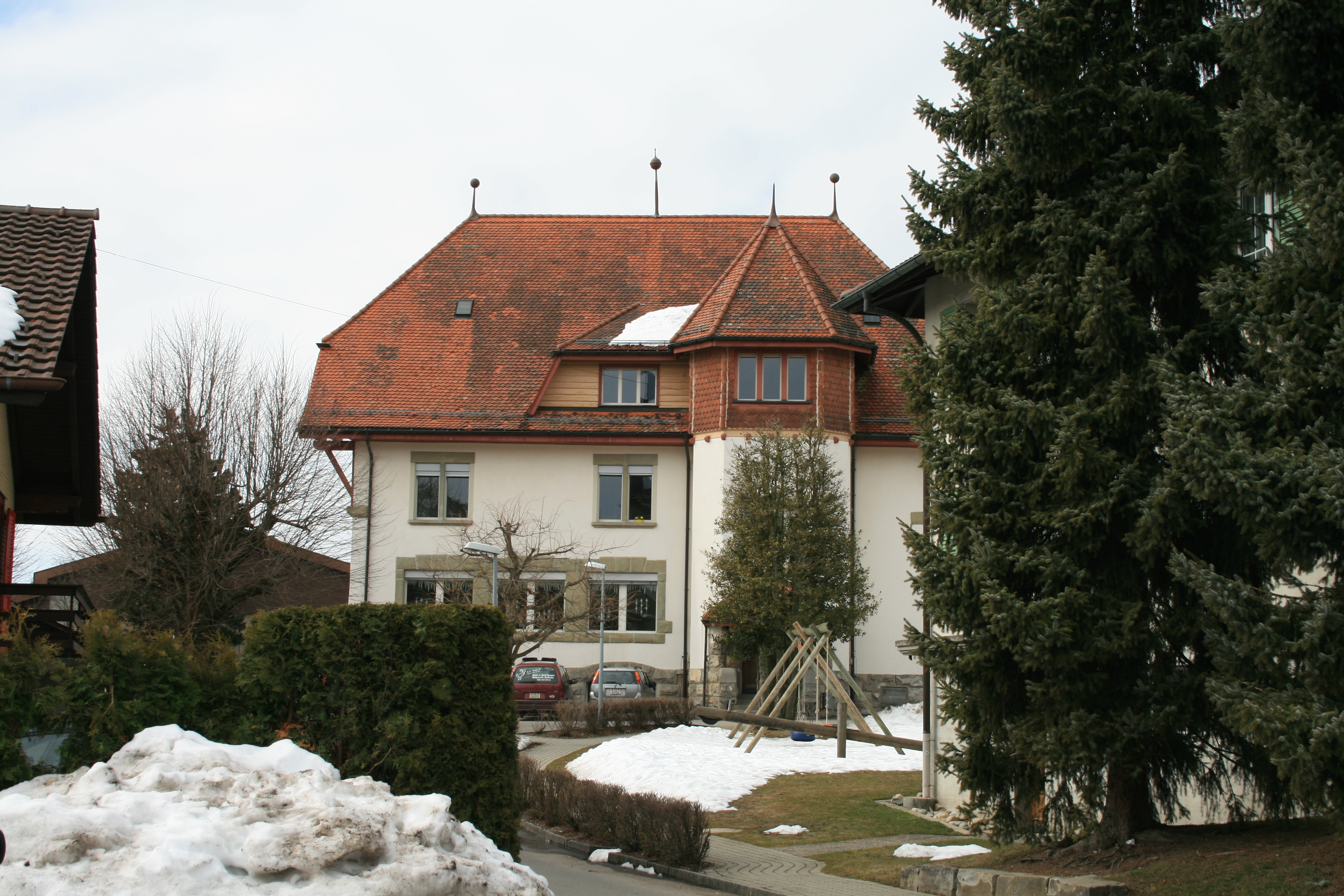
Rechthalten village school

In Rechthalten about 372 or (36.3%) of the population have completed non-mandatory upper secondary education, and 97 or (9.5%) have completed additional higher education (either university or a Fachhochschule). Of the 97 who completed tertiary schooling, 68.0% were Swiss men, 20.6% were Swiss women, 8.2% were non-Swiss men.

The Canton of Fribourg school system provides one year of non-obligatory Kindergarten, followed by six years of Primary school. This is followed by three years of obligatory lower Secondary school where the students are separated according to ability and aptitude. Following the lower Secondary students may attend a three or four year optional upper Secondary school. The upper Secondary school is divided into gymnasium (university preparatory) and vocational programs. After they finish the upper Secondary program, students may choose to attend a Tertiary school or continue their apprenticeship.

During the 2010–11 school year, there were a total of 111 students attending 6 classes in Rechthalten. A total of 153 students from the municipality attended any school, either in the municipality or outside of it. There were 2 kindergarten classes with a total of 43 students in the municipality. The municipality had 4 primary classes and 68 students. During the same year, there were no lower secondary classes in the municipality, but 26 students attended lower secondary school in a neighboring municipality. There were no upper Secondary classes or vocational classes, but there were 17 upper Secondary students and 14 upper Secondary vocational students who attended classes in another municipality. The municipality had no non-university Tertiary classes, but there were 2 non-university Tertiary students and one specialized Tertiary student who attended classes in another municipality.

As of 2000, there were 14 students in Rechthalten who came from another municipality, while 62 residents attended schools outside the municipality.
