= Léon Fagel =

French sculptor

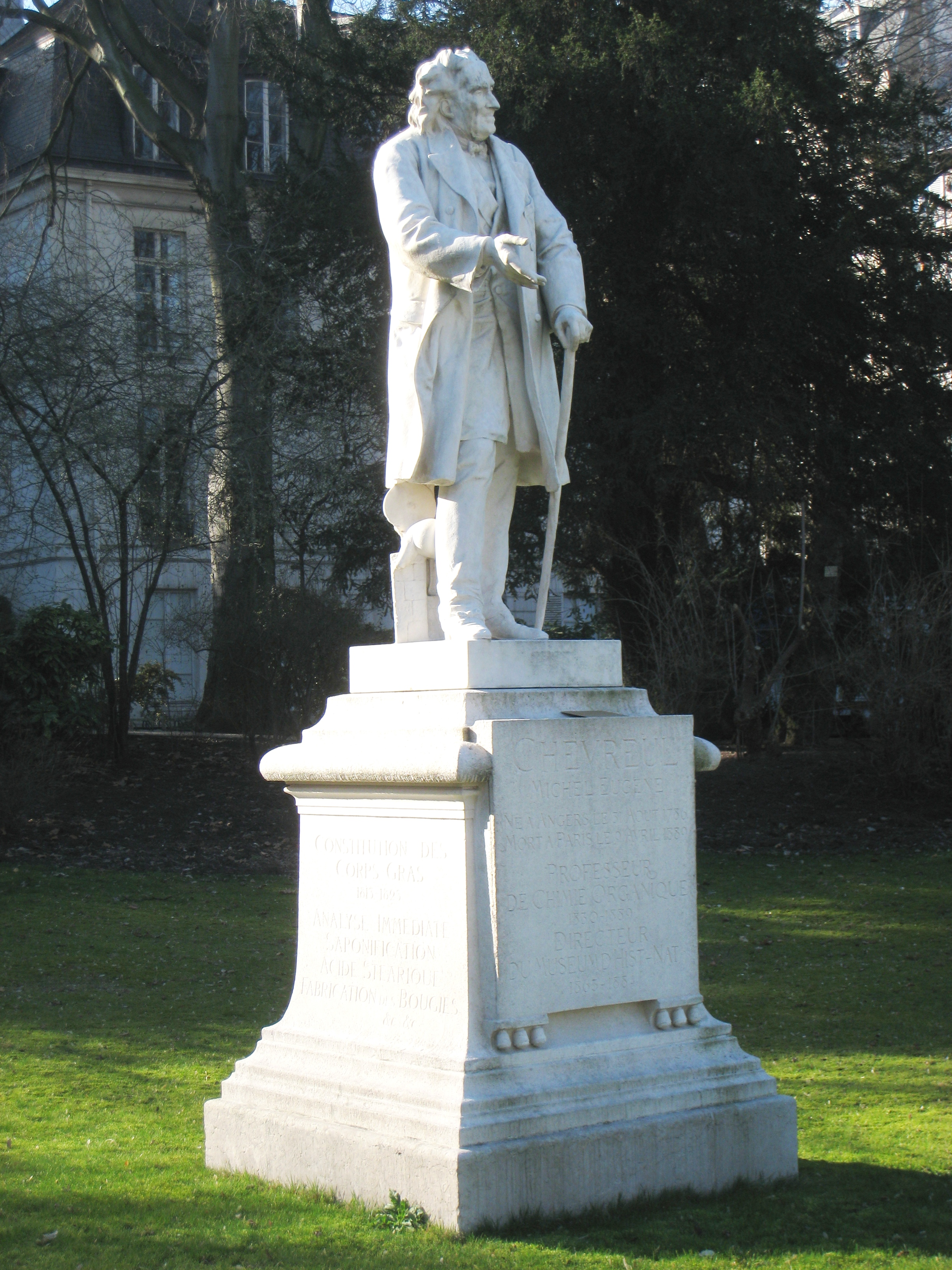
Statue of Michel Eugène Chevreul by Léon Fagel.

Léon Fagel (1851–1913) was a French sculptor, best known for his busts.

Fagel was born in Valenciennes, won the second Prix de Rome in 1875, and the Prix de Rome in 1879. He exhibited busts of Chevreul, J. Cavelier, and Le Greffeur at the Exposition Universelle (1900), along with two large reliefs for Sacré-Cœur (Faith and Fortitude).

== Selected works ==
- Paris
  - La Loi et La Justice, Cour des Comptes
  - La Vierge des Marins, Sacré-Cœur
  - Lettres, Sorbonne
  - Michel Eugène Chevreul, Jardin des Plantes
  - Jean-Baptiste Lamarck, Jardin des Plantes
  - Sculpture, Place du Carrousel
  - Silvestre, Comédie-Française
- Elsewhere
  - Art, École Nationale Supérieure d'Arts et Métiers Centre de Lille, Lille
  - Catherine Joséphine de Raffin, Musée des Beaux-Arts, Valenciennes
  - Charles-François Daubigny, Auvers
  - Joseph-François Dupleix, Landrecies
  - Monument to the Battle of Wattignies (1793), Maubeuge
