= Alterswil =

- Former municipality
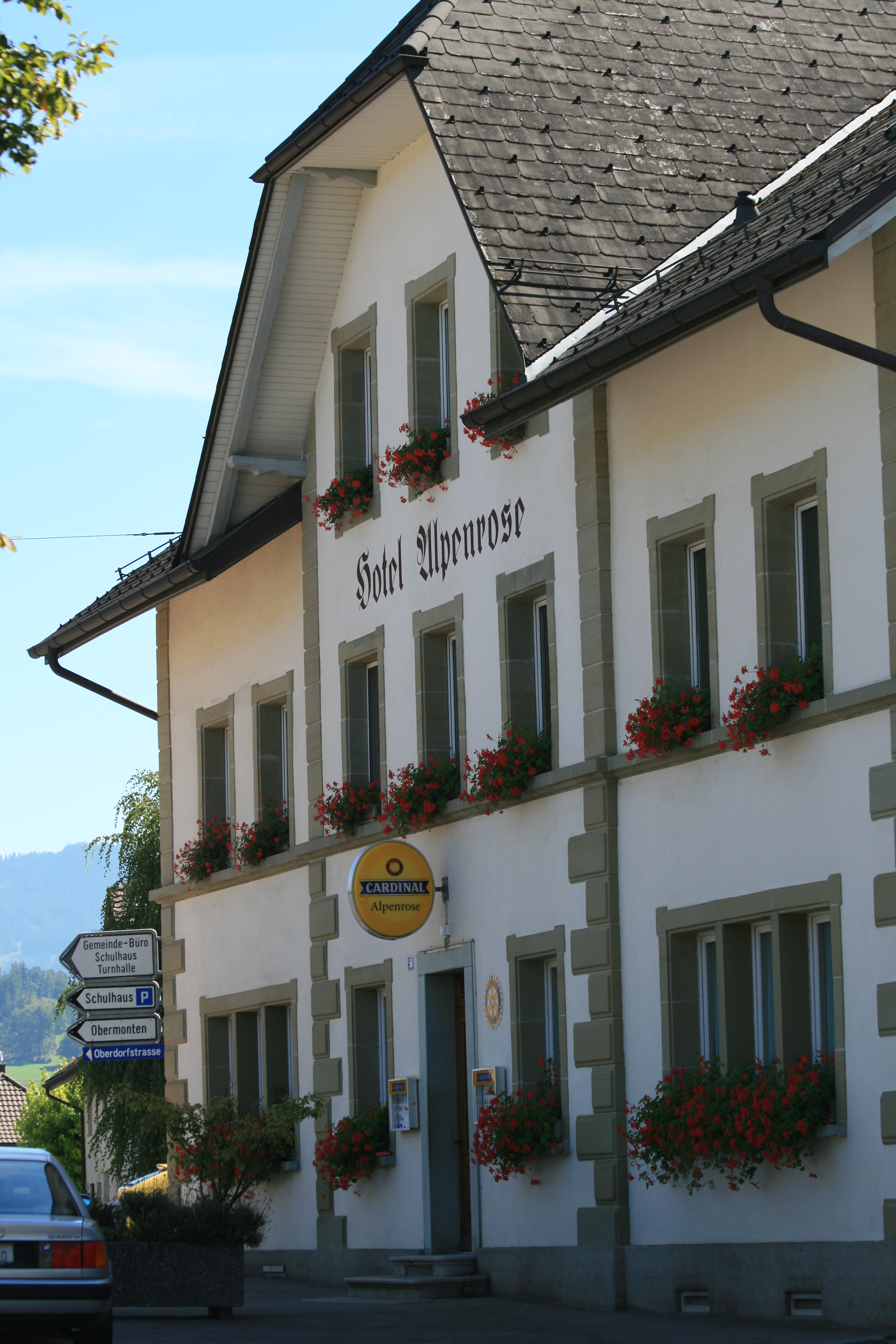
- Hotel Alpenrose in Alterswil village

- Coat of arms
- Location of Alterswil
- Location within Switzerland Location within Canton of Fribourg
- Coordinates: 46°48′N 7°16′E
- Country: Switzerland
- Canton: Fribourg
- District: Sense

Government
  - Mayor: Gemeindeammann

Area
  - Total: 16.1 km^{2} (6.2 sq mi)
- Elevation: 758 m (2,487 ft)

Population (2019)
  - Total: 2,050
  - Density: 127/km^{2} (330/sq mi)
- Time zone: UTC+01:00 (CET)
  - Summer (DST): UTC+02:00 (CEST)
- Postal code: 1715
- SFOS number: 2291
- ISO 3166 code: CH-FR
- Surrounded by: Brünisried, Guggisberg (BE), Sankt Antoni, Sankt Ursen, Tafers, Wahlern (BE), Plaffeien
- Website: www.alterswil.ch

Alterswil is a former municipality in the district of Sense in the canton of Fribourg in Switzerland. It is one of the municipalities with a large majority of German speakers in the mostly French speaking Canton of Fribourg. On 1 January 2021 the former municipalities of St. Antoni and Alterswil merged into the municipality of Tafers.

== History ==
Alterswil is first mentioned in 1148 as Alterihcwilere. In 1228 it was mentioned as Vilar Altri.

== Geography ==
Aerial view (1958)

Alterswil had an area of 16.14 km^{2} (6.23 sq mi). Of this area, 12.31 km^{2} (4.75 mi^{2}) or 76.4% is used for agricultural purposes, while 2.61 km^{2} (1.01 mi^{2}) or 16.2% is forested. Of the rest of the land, 1.06 km^{2} (0.41 mi^{2}) or 6.6% is settled (buildings or roads), 0.08 km^{2} (20 acres) or 0.5% is either rivers or lakes and 0.02 km^{2} (4.9 acres) or 0.1% is unproductive land.

Of the built up area, housing and buildings made up 4.3% and transportation infrastructure made up 1.4%. Out of the forested land, 14.0% of the total land area is heavily forested and 2.2% is covered with orchards or small clusters of trees. Of the agricultural land, 45.4% is used for growing crops and 29.4% is pastures, while 1.6% is used for orchards or vine crops. All the water in the municipality is flowing water.

The former municipality is located in the Sense district, about 10 km (6.2 mi) east of Fribourg. It consists of the linear village of Alterswil and the surrounding settlements of Äckerli, Bennewil, Galtern, Gerewil, Heimberg, Wengliswil, Wilersgut, Wolgiswil, Zumholz and Zitterli.

== Coat of arms ==
The blazon of the municipal coat of arms is Gules, a fleur de lis Argent.

== Demographics ==
Alterswil had a population (as of 2019) of 2,050. As of 2008, 4.1% of the population are resident foreign nationals. Over the last 10 years (2000–2010) the population has changed at a rate of 1.1%. Migration accounted for -0.6%, while births and deaths accounted for 1.8%.

Most of the population (as of 2000) speaks German (1,765 or 93.8%) as their first language, Albanian is the second most common (49 or 2.6%) and French is the third (43 or 2.3%). There are 3 people who speak Italian and 1 person who speaks Romansh.

As of 2008, the population was 49.9% male and 50.1% female. The population was made up of 916 Swiss men (48.2% of the population) and 31 (1.6%) non-Swiss men. There were 909 Swiss women (47.9%) and 43 (2.3%) non-Swiss women. Of the population in the municipality, 851 or about 45.2% were born in Alterswil and lived there in 2000. There were 623 or 33.1% who were born in the same canton, while 242 or 12.9% were born somewhere else in Switzerland, and 98 or 5.2% were born outside of Switzerland.

As of 2000, children and teenagers (0–19 years old) make up 26.2% of the population, while adults (20–64 years old) make up 60.2% and seniors (over 64 years old) make up 13.6%.

As of 2000, there were 835 people who were single and never married in the municipality. There were 903 married individuals, 95 widows or widowers and 48 individuals who are divorced.

As of 2000, there were 685 private households in the municipality, and an average of 2.7 persons per household. There were 163 households that consist of only one person and 82 households with five or more people. In 2000, a total of 668 apartments (92.6% of the total) were permanently occupied, while 28 apartments (3.9%) were seasonally occupied and 25 apartments (3.5%) were empty. As of 2009, the construction rate of new housing units was 2.1 new units per 1000 residents. The vacancy rate for the municipality, in 2010, was 1.88%.

The historical population is given in the following chart:

== Politics ==
In the 2011 federal election the most popular party was the SVP which received 23.8% of the vote. The next three most popular parties were the CVP (22.8%), the SPS (22.4%) and the CSP (10.0%).

The SVP improved their position in Alterswil rising to first, from second in 2007 (with 20.1%) The CVP moved from first in 2007 (with 25.9%) to second in 2011, the SPS retained about the same popularity (18.9% in 2007) and the CSP lost popularity (15.0% in 2007). A total of 781 votes were cast in this election, of which 9 or 1.2% were invalid.

== Economy ==
As of 2010, Alterswil had an unemployment rate of 1.4%. As of 2008, there were 169 people employed in the primary economic sector and about 57 businesses involved in this sector. 150 people were employed in the secondary sector and there were 23 businesses in this sector. 192 people were employed in the tertiary sector, with 38 businesses in this sector. There were 989 residents of the municipality who were employed in some capacity, of which females made up 41.5% of the workforce.

In 2008 the total number of full-time equivalent jobs was 394. The number of jobs in the primary sector was 105, all of which were in agriculture. The number of jobs in the secondary sector was 145 of which 50 or (34.5%) were in manufacturing, 1 was in mining and 81 (55.9%) were in construction. The number of jobs in the tertiary sector was 144. In the tertiary sector; 52 or 36.1% were in wholesale or retail sales or the repair of motor vehicles, 12 or 8.3% were in the movement and storage of goods, 15 or 10.4% were in a hotel or restaurant, 9 or 6.3% were the insurance or financial industry, 21 or 14.6% were technical professionals or scientists, 9 or 6.3% were in education and 4 or 2.8% were in health care.

In 2000, there were 188 workers who commuted into the municipality and 697 workers who commuted away. The municipality is a net exporter of workers, with about 3.7 workers leaving the municipality for every one entering. Of the working population, 9.6% used public transportation to get to work, and 66.5% used a private car.

== Religion ==
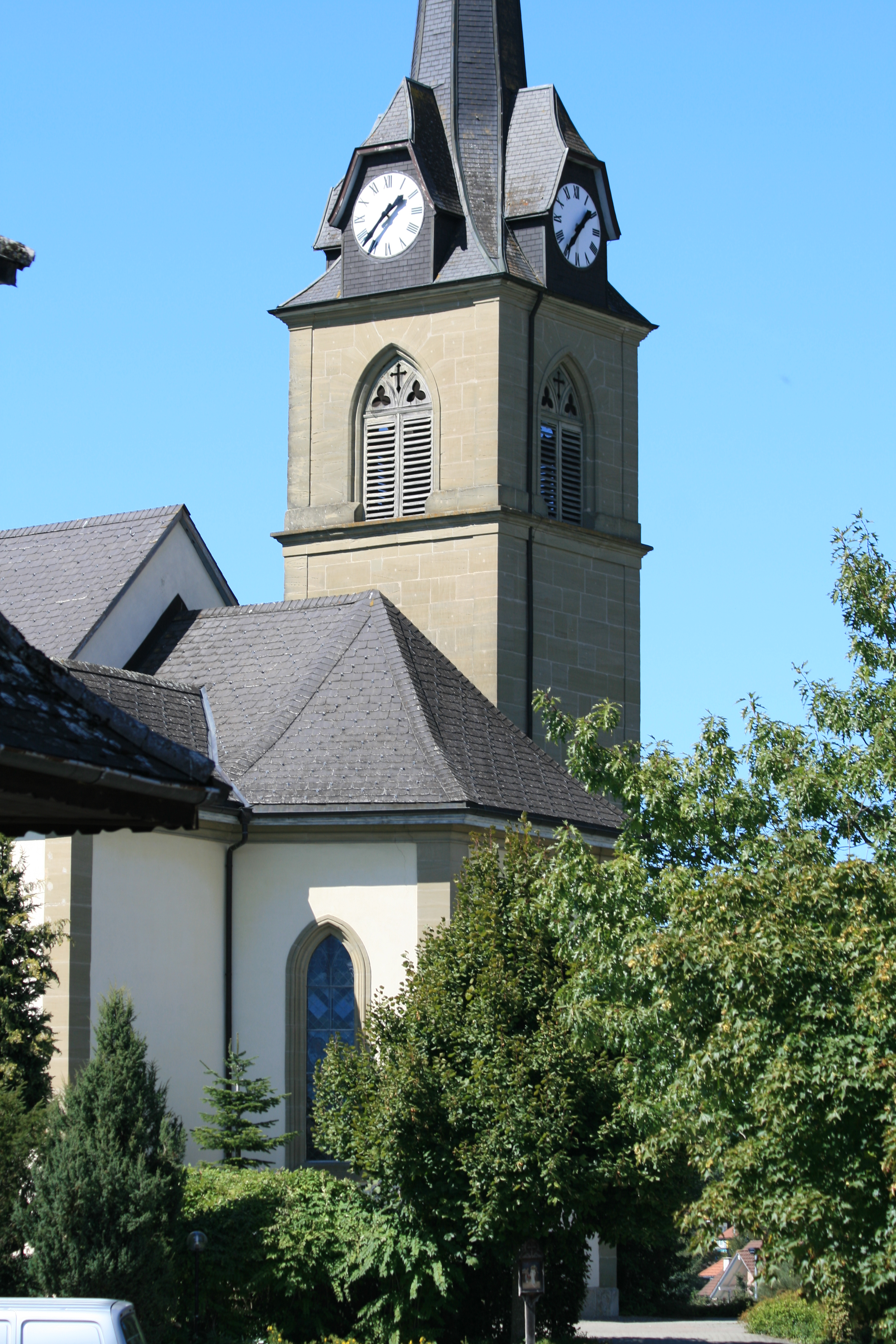
Church in Alterswil

From the 2000 census, 1,352 or 71.9% were Roman Catholic, while 310 or 16.5% belonged to the Swiss Reformed Church. Of the rest of the population, there were 13 members of an Orthodox church (or about 0.69% of the population), there were 2 individuals (or about 0.11% of the population) who belonged to the Christian Catholic Church, and there were 12 individuals (or about 0.64% of the population) who belonged to another Christian church. There were 75 (or about 3.99% of the population) who were Islamic. There was 1 person who was Buddhist and 2 individuals who belonged to another church. 43 (or about 2.29% of the population) belonged to no church, are agnostic or atheist, and 77 individuals (or about 4.09% of the population) did not answer the question.

== Education ==
In Alterswil about 647 or (34.4%) of the population have completed non-mandatory upper secondary education, and 178 or (9.5%) have completed additional higher education (either university or a Fachhochschule). Of the 178 who completed tertiary schooling, 71.9% were Swiss men, 24.7% were Swiss women.

The Canton of Fribourg school system provides one year of non-obligatory Kindergarten, followed by six years of Primary school. This is followed by three years of obligatory lower Secondary school where the students are separated according to ability and aptitude. Following the lower Secondary students may attend a three or four year optional upper Secondary school. The upper Secondary school is divided into gymnasium (university preparatory) and vocational programs. After they finish the upper Secondary program, students may choose to attend a Tertiary school or continue their apprenticeship.

During the 2010-11 school year, there were a total of 132 students attending 8 classes in Alterswil. A total of 280 students from the municipality attended any school, either in the municipality or outside of it. There were 2 kindergarten classes with a total of 29 students in the municipality. The municipality had 6 primary classes and 103 students. During the same year, there were no lower secondary classes in the municipality, but 63 students attended lower secondary school in a neighboring municipality. There were no upper Secondary classes or vocational classes, but there were 27 upper Secondary students and 47 upper Secondary vocational students who attended classes in another municipality. The municipality had no non-university Tertiary classes, but there was one non-university Tertiary student and one specialized Tertiary student who attended classes in another municipality.

As of 2000, there were 44 students in Alterswil who came from another municipality, while 153 residents attended schools outside the municipality.
