= Giffers =

- Municipality
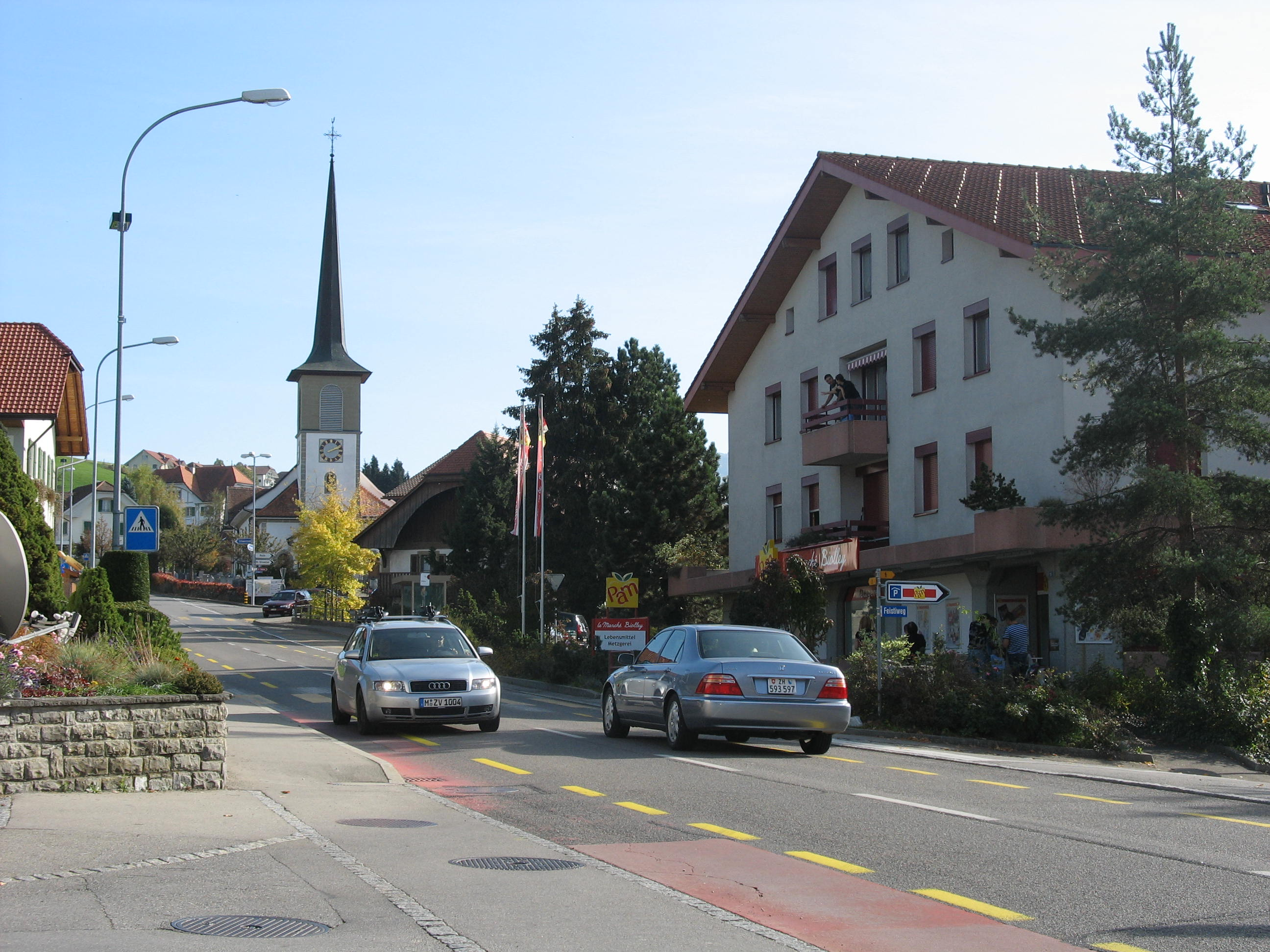
- Giffers village

- Flag Coat of arms
- Location of Giffers
- Location within Switzerland Location within Canton of Fribourg
- Coordinates: 46°46′N 7°13′E
- Country: Switzerland
- Canton: Fribourg
- District: Sense

Government
  - Mayor: Gemeindeammann

Area
  - Total: 5.15 km^{2} (1.99 sq mi)
- Elevation: 767 m (2,516 ft)

Population (December 2020)
  - Total: 1,664
  - Density: 323/km^{2} (837/sq mi)
- Time zone: UTC+01:00 (CET)
  - Summer (DST): UTC+02:00 (CEST)
- Postal code: 1735
- SFOS number: 2294
- ISO 3166 code: CH-FR
- Surrounded by: Plaffeien, Plasselb, Rechthalten, Sankt Silvester, Tentlingen
- Website: www.giffers.ch

Giffers (French: Chevrilles; Arpitan: Chevrilyes [tsəˈvʁiʎə]) is a municipality in the district of Sense in the canton of Fribourg, Switzerland. It is one of the municipalities with a large majority of German speakers in the mostly French speaking Canton of Fribourg.

== History ==
Giffers is first mentioned in 1160 as Chivriles. In 1301 it was mentioned as Guifrils and in 1577 it was first called Giffers.

== Geography ==
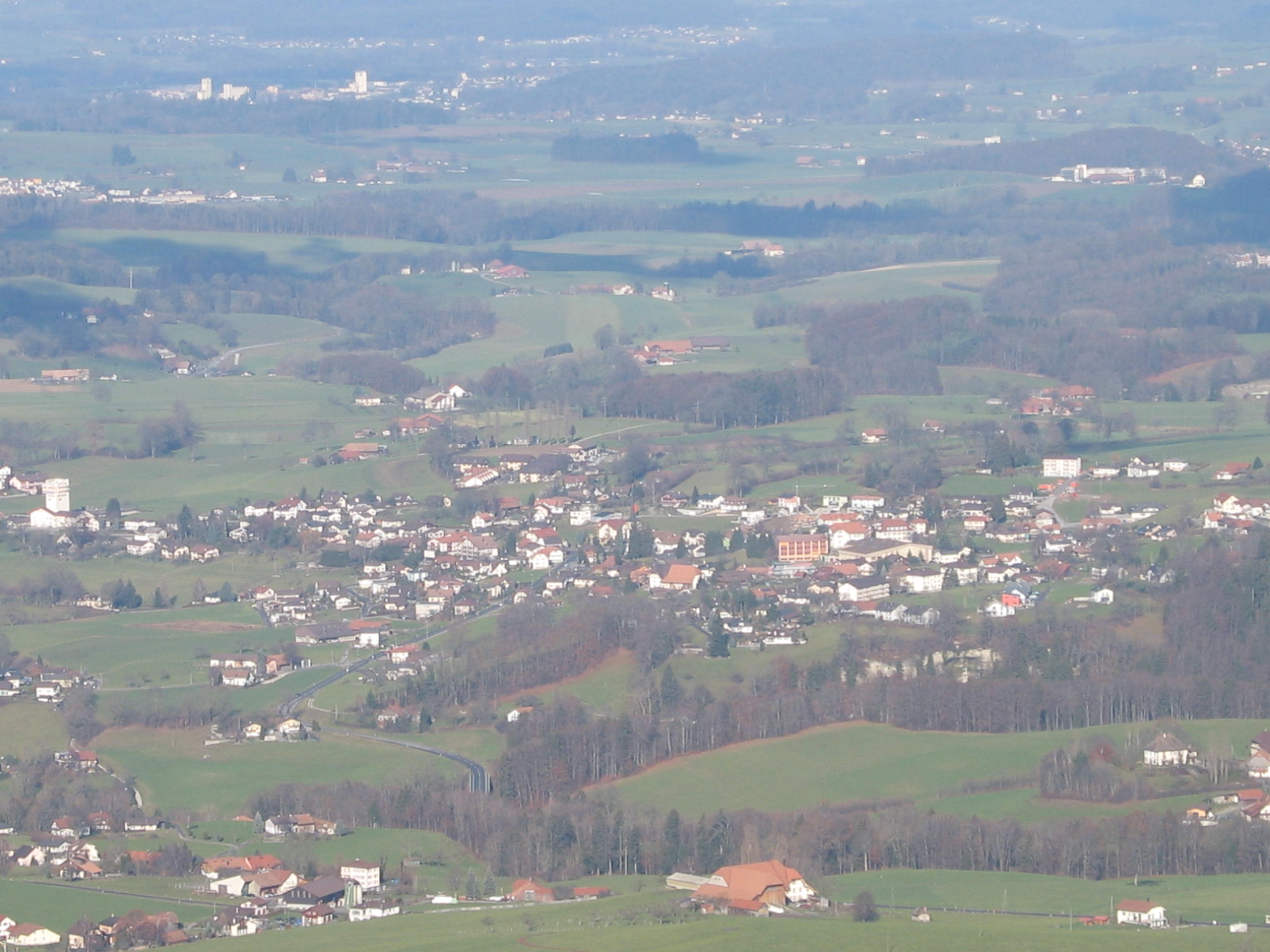
Giffers from above

Giffers has an area of 5.22 km^{2} (2.02 sq mi). Of this area, 3.38 km^{2} (1.31 mi^{2}) or 64.9% is used for agricultural purposes, while 1.02 km^{2} (0.39 mi^{2}) or 19.6% is forested. Of the rest of the land, 0.71 km^{2} (0.27 mi^{2}) or 13.6% is settled (buildings or roads), 0.11 km^{2} (27 acres) or 2.1% is either rivers or lakes.

Of the built up area, housing and buildings made up 7.9% and transportation infrastructure made up 4.0%. Out of the forested land, 18.4% of the total land area is heavily forested and 1.2% is covered with orchards or small clusters of trees. Of the agricultural land, 19.2% is used for growing crops and 45.1% is pastures. All the water in the municipality is flowing water.

The municipality is located in the Sense district, on the Ärgera/Gérine river 7 km (4.3 mi) south-east of Fribourg. It consists of the linear village of Giffers and the hamlets of Färtschera, Gauchetli, Matte, Neustatt, Popplera and Vorsatz.

== Coat of arms ==
The blazon of the municipal coat of arms is Quarterly Or and Gules, four Quatrefoils counterchanged.

== Demographics ==
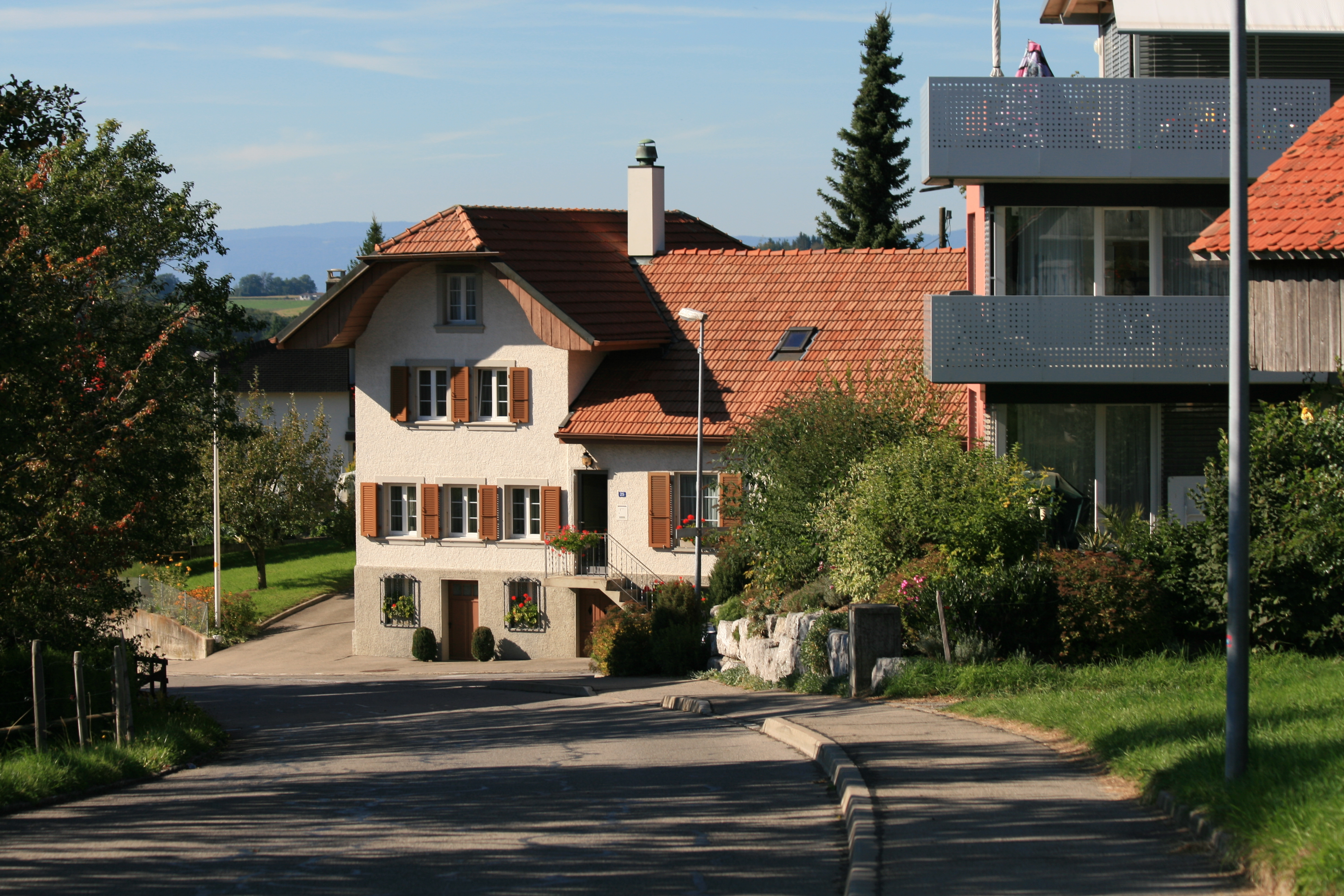
House in Giffers

Giffers has a population (as of December 2020) of 1,664. As of 2008, 3.8% of the population are resident foreign nationals. Over the last 10 years (2000–2010) the population has changed at a rate of 6.5%. Migration accounted for 2.1%, while births and deaths accounted for 4.9%.

Most of the population (as of 2000) speaks German (1,281 or 92.0%) as their first language, French is the second most common (95 or 6.8%) and English is the third (2 or 0.1%). There is 1 person who speaks Italian.

As of 2008, the population was 48.2% male and 51.8% female. The population was made up of 679 Swiss men (45.5% of the population) and 40 (2.7%) non-Swiss men. There were 739 Swiss women (49.6%) and 33 (2.2%) non-Swiss women. Of the population in the municipality, 502 or about 36.0% were born in Giffers and lived there in 2000. There were 574 or 41.2% who were born in the same canton, while 205 or 14.7% were born somewhere else in Switzerland, and 61 or 4.4% were born outside of Switzerland.

As of 2000, children and teenagers (0–19 years old) make up 25.8% of the population, while adults (20–64 years old) make up 60.9% and seniors (over 64 years old) make up 13.3%.

As of 2000, there were 645 people who were single and never married in the municipality. There were 618 married individuals, 65 widows or widowers and 65 individuals who are divorced.

As of 2000, there were 499 private households in the municipality, and an average of 2.5 persons per household. There were 123 households that consist of only one person and 25 households with five or more people. In 2000, a total of 486 apartments (92.7% of the total) were permanently occupied, while 28 apartments (5.3%) were seasonally occupied and 10 apartments (1.9%) were empty. As of 2009, the construction rate of new housing units was 5.6 new units per 1000 residents. The vacancy rate for the municipality, in 2010, was 0.84%.

The historical population is given in the following chart:

== Politics ==
In the 2011 federal election the most popular party was the FDP which received 29.6% of the vote. The next three most popular parties were the SVP (19.4%), the SPS (15.4%) and the CVP (13.3%).

The FDP lost about 6.6% of the vote when compared to the 2007 Federal election (36.3% in 2007 vs 29.6% in 2011). The SVP moved from third in 2007 (with 14.7%) to second in 2011, the SPS moved from below fourth place in 2007 to third and the CVP moved from second in 2007 (with 18.2%) to fourth. A total of 540 votes were cast in this election, of which 10 or 1.9% were invalid.

== Economy ==
As of 2010, Giffers had an unemployment rate of 1.9%. As of 2008, there were 53 people employed in the primary economic sector and about 23 businesses involved in this sector. 76 people were employed in the secondary sector and there were 15 businesses in this sector. 222 people were employed in the tertiary sector, with 36 businesses in this sector. There were 745 residents of the municipality who were employed in some capacity, of which females made up 43.1% of the workforce.

In 2008 the total number of full-time equivalent jobs was 266. The number of jobs in the primary sector was 35, all of which were in agriculture. The number of jobs in the secondary sector was 64 of which 28 or (43.8%) were in manufacturing and 35 (54.7%) were in construction. The number of jobs in the tertiary sector was 167. In the tertiary sector; 41 or 24.6% were in wholesale or retail sales or the repair of motor vehicles, 7 or 4.2% were in the movement and storage of goods, 10 or 6.0% were in a hotel or restaurant, 2 or 1.2% were in the information industry, 14 or 8.4% were the insurance or financial industry, 6 or 3.6% were technical professionals or scientists, 19 or 11.4% were in education and 42 or 25.1% were in health care.

In 2000, there were 138 workers who commuted into the municipality and 553 workers who commuted away. The municipality is a net exporter of workers, with about 4.0 workers leaving the municipality for every one entering. Of the working population, 9.5% used public transportation to get to work, and 68.2% used a private car.

== Religion ==
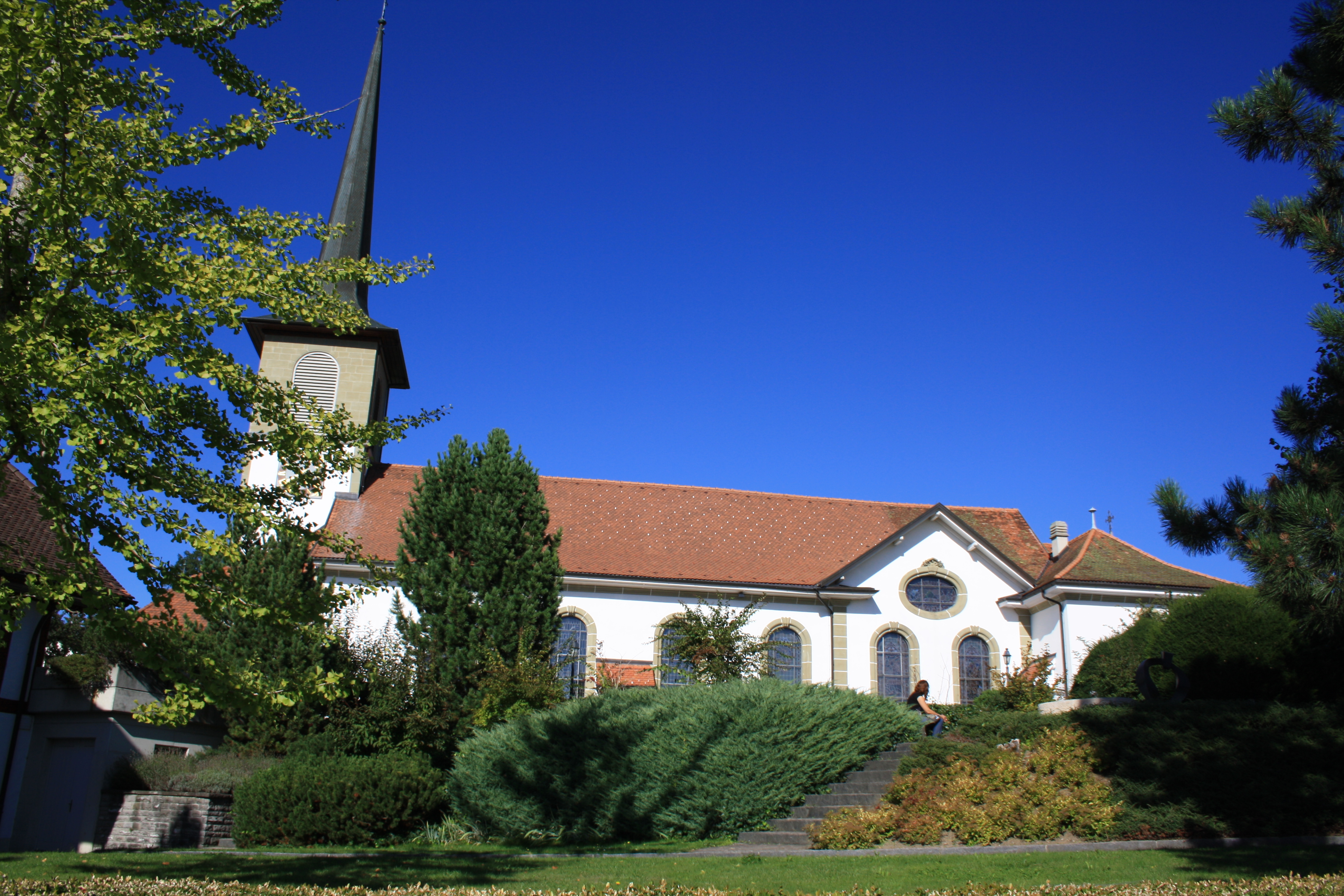
Roman Catholic church in Giffers

From the 2000 census, 1,160 or 83.3% were Roman Catholic, while 123 or 8.8% belonged to the Swiss Reformed Church. Of the rest of the population, there were 2 members of an Orthodox church (or about 0.14% of the population), and there were 20 individuals (or about 1.44% of the population) who belonged to another Christian church. There were 6 (or about 0.43% of the population) who were Islamic. There were 2 individuals who were Buddhist. 42 (or about 3.02% of the population) belonged to no church, are agnostic or atheist, and 48 individuals (or about 3.45% of the population) did not answer the question.

== Education ==
In Giffers about 515 or (37.0%) of the population have completed non-mandatory upper secondary education, and 100 or (7.2%) have completed additional higher education (either university or a Fachhochschule). Of the 100 who completed tertiary schooling, 72.0% were Swiss men, 20.0% were Swiss women.

The Canton of Fribourg school system provides one year of non-obligatory Kindergarten, followed by six years of Primary school. This is followed by three years of obligatory lower Secondary school where the students are separated according to ability and aptitude. Following the lower Secondary students may attend a three or four year optional upper Secondary school. The upper Secondary school is divided into gymnasium (university preparatory) and vocational programs. After they finish the upper Secondary program, students may choose to attend a Tertiary school or continue their apprenticeship.

During the 2010-11 school year, there were a total of 209 students attending 11 classes in Giffers. A total of 205 students from the municipality attended any school, either in the municipality or outside of it. There were 2 kindergarten classes with a total of 27 students in the municipality. The municipality had 9 primary classes and 182 students. During the same year, there were no lower secondary classes in the municipality, but 44 students attended lower secondary school in a neighboring municipality. There were no upper Secondary classes or vocational classes, but there were 11 upper Secondary students and 31 upper Secondary vocational students who attended classes in another municipality. The municipality had no non-university Tertiary classes, but there were 2 non-university Tertiary students and 3 specialized Tertiary students who attended classes in another municipality.

As of 2000, there were 112 students in Giffers who came from another municipality, while 76 residents attended schools outside the municipality.
