= Sense District =

Coordinates: 46.814999°N 7.215835°E

Sense District Sensebezirk
- District
- Country: Switzerland
- Canton: Fribourg
- Capital: Tafers

Area
  - Total: 265.3 km^{2} (102.4 sq mi)

Population (31 December 2020)
  - Total: 44,594
  - Density: 168.1/km^{2} (435.3/sq mi)
- Time zone: UTC+1 (CET)
  - Summer (DST): UTC+2 (CEST)
- Municipalities: 15
- Website: http://www.fr.ch/pref/de/pub/psi/index.cfm

Sense District (German: Sensebezirk; French: District de la Singine [distʁi(kt) d(ə) la sɛ̃ʒin]; Arpitan: District de la Singena [diʃˈtʁi də la ʃɛ̃ˈdzəna]) is one of the seven administrative districts of the canton of Fribourg in Switzerland, and the only completely German-speaking one. It is named after the Sense river, which forms the majority of its eastern border with the canton of Bern.

== History ==
The Sense region was first mentioned historically in 1076 under the name Sensuna. It became a district since the canton was reorganized from four into seven districts in 1848. Most of the Sense belonged to the lordship of the Republik Freiburg (Respublicas Friburgensis) until the demise of the ancien régime. The district has its own dialect, called Sensler German.

== Municipalities ==
It contains 15 municipalities. The municipalities are:

Coat of Arms	Municipality name	Population (31 December 2020)	Area in km^{2}
	Bösingen	3,421	14.33
Brünisried	Brünisried	670	3.25
Düdingen	Düdingen	8,300	30.76
Giffers	Giffers	1,664	5.22
Heitenried	Heitenried	1,395	9.13
Plaffein	Plaffeien	3,613	66.53
Plasselb	Plasselb	1,010	18.16
Rechthalten	Rechthalten	1,106	7.31
Schmitten	Schmitten	4,166	13.5
St. Silvester	St. Silvester	952	7.04
St. Ursen	St. Ursen	1,365	15.72
Tafers	Tafers	3,532	41.3
Tentlingen	Tentlingen	1,348	3.61
Überstorf	Ueberstorf	2,382	16.11
Wünnewil-Flamatt	Wünnewil-Flamatt	5,559	13.27
	Total	44,594	265.35

== Coat of arms ==
The blazon of the district coat of arms is Azure, a Guard statant afrontee clad Azure and Sable ensigned with a Cross on sinister, holding in dexter a Halberd Argent.

== Demographics ==
Sense has a population (as of December 2020) of 44,594. Most of the population (as of 2000) speaks German (35,275 or 92.1%) as their first language, French is the second most common (1,217 or 3.2%) and Albanian is the third (630 or 1.6%). There are 200 people who speak Italian and 14 people who speak Romansh.

As of 2008, the population was 50.1% male and 49.9% female. The population was made up of 18,568 Swiss men (45.6% of the population) and 1,821 (4.5%) non-Swiss men. There were 18,786 Swiss women (46.1%) and 1,553 (3.8%) non-Swiss women. Of the population in the district, 15,257 or about 39.8% were born in Sense and lived there in 2000. There were 11,390 or 29.7% who were born in the same canton, while 7,378 or 19.3% were born somewhere else in Switzerland, and 3,070 or 8.0% were born outside of Switzerland.

As of 2000, there were 16,738 people who were single and never married in the district. There were 18,372 married individuals, 1,914 widows or widowers and 1,275 individuals who are divorced.

There were 3,592 households that consist of only one person and 1,320 households with five or more people.

The historical population is given in the following chart:

== Mergers and name changes ==
- On 1 January 1962 the municipality of Grossbösingen changed its name to Bösingen.
- On 1 January 1971 the former municipality of Neuhaus merged into Plasselb.
- On 1 January 1974 the municipality of Wünnewil changed its name to Wünnewil-Flamatt.
- On 1 January 2017 the former municipalities of Zumholz and Oberschrot merged into Plaffeien.
- On 1 January 2021 the former municipalities of St. Antoni and Alterswil merged into the municipality of Tafers.

== Politics ==
In the 2011 federal election the most popular party was the SVP which received 23.0% of the vote. The next three most popular parties were the CVP (22.4%), the SPS (18.1%) and the CSP (11.2%).

The SVP improved their position in Sense rising to first, from second in 2007 (with 20.5%) The CVP moved from first in 2007 (with 26.0%) to second in 2011, the SPS moved from fourth in 2007 (with 14.2%) to third and the CSP moved from third in 2007 (with 16.2%) to fourth. A total of 15,267 votes were cast in this election, of which 149 or 1.0% were invalid.

== Religion ==
From the 2000 census, 26,849 or 70.1% were Roman Catholic, while 6,913 or 18.1% belonged to the Swiss Reformed Church. Of the rest of the population, there were 356 members of an Orthodox church (or about 0.93% of the population), there were 22 individuals (or about 0.06% of the population) who belonged to the Christian Catholic Church, and there were 712 individuals (or about 1.86% of the population) who belonged to another Christian church. There were 2 individuals (or about 0.01% of the population) who were Jewish, and 1,142 (or about 2.98% of the population) who were Islamic. There were 62 individuals who were Buddhist, 33 individuals who were Hindu and 29 individuals who belonged to another church. 1,463 (or about 3.82% of the population) belonged to no church, are agnostic or atheist, and 1,058 individuals (or about 2.76% of the population) did not answer the question.

== Education ==
In Sense about 13,818 or (36.1%) of the population have completed non-mandatory upper secondary education, and 4,003 or (10.5%) have completed additional higher education (either university or a Fachhochschule). Of the 4,003 who completed tertiary schooling, 71.3% were Swiss men, 21.4% were Swiss women, 4.8% were non-Swiss men and 2.5% were non-Swiss women.

The Canton of Fribourg school system provides one year of non-obligatory Kindergarten, followed by six years of Primary school. This is followed by three years of obligatory lower Secondary school where the students are separated according to ability and aptitude. Following the lower Secondary students may attend a three or four year optional upper Secondary school. The upper Secondary school is divided into gymnasium (university preparatory) and vocational programs. After they finish the upper Secondary program, students may choose to attend a Tertiary school or continue their apprenticeship.

During the 2010-11 school year, there were a total of 4,970 students attending 268 classes in Sense. A total of 6,416 students from the district attended any school, either in the district or outside of it. There were 44 kindergarten classes with a total of 814 students in the district. The district had 134 primary classes and 2,587 students. During the same year, there were 86 lower secondary classes with a total of 1,531 students. There were no upper Secondary classes or vocational classes, but there were 623 upper Secondary students and 754 upper Secondary vocational students who attended classes in another municipality. The district had 4 special Tertiary classes, with 38 specialized Tertiary students.
