= St. Ursen =

- Municipality
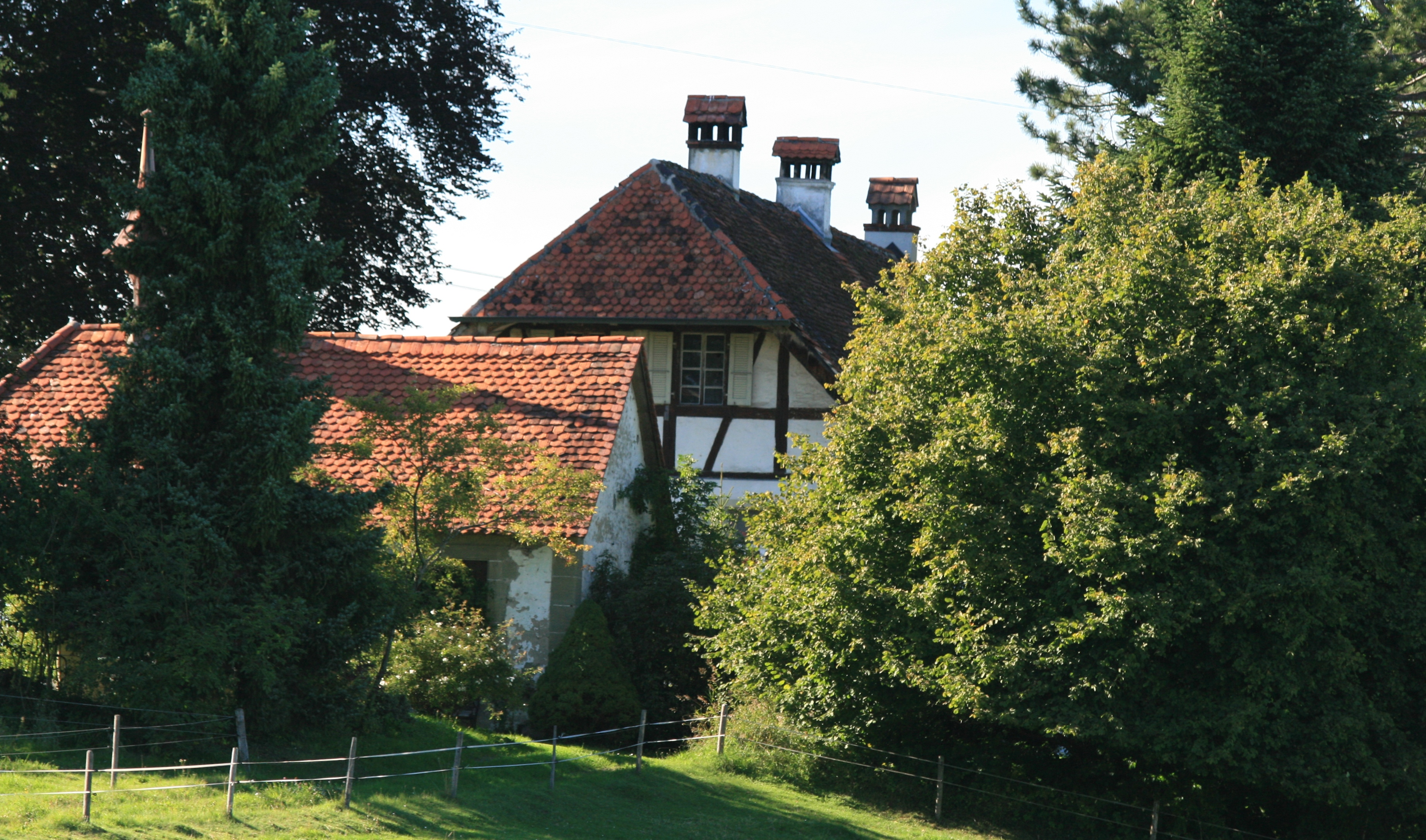
- Manor in the hamlet of Römerswil in St. Ursen

- Coat of arms
- Location of St. Ursen
- Location within Switzerland Location within Canton of Fribourg
- Coordinates: 46°47′N 7°13′E
- Country: Switzerland
- Canton: Fribourg
- District: Sense

Government
  - Mayor: Gemeindeammann

Area
  - Total: 15.73 km^{2} (6.07 sq mi)
- Elevation: 713 m (2,339 ft)

Population (December 2020)
  - Total: 1,365
  - Density: 86.78/km^{2} (224.8/sq mi)
- Time zone: UTC+01:00 (CET)
  - Summer (DST): UTC+02:00 (CEST)
- Postal code: 1717
- SFOS number: 2304
- ISO 3166 code: CH-FR
- Surrounded by: Alterswil, Brünisried, Fribourg (Freiburg im Üechtland/Fribourg), Pierrafortscha, Rechthalten, Tafers, Tentlingen
- Website: www.stursen.ch

St. Ursen (known as Saint-Ours in French; Arpitan: Sent-Ôrs [ʃɛ̃t wa]) is a municipality in the district of Sense in the canton of Fribourg in Switzerland. It is one of the municipalities with a large majority of German speakers in the mostly French-speaking Canton of Fribourg.

== History ==
St. Ursen is first mentioned in 1651 as ex sancto Urso.

== Geography ==
St. Ursen has an area of 15.72 km^{2} (6.07 sq mi). Of this area, 11.76 km^{2} (4.54 mi^{2}) or 74.6% is used for agricultural purposes, while 2.92 km^{2} (1.13 mi^{2}) or 18.5% is forested. Of the rest of the land, 1.02 km^{2} (0.39 mi^{2}) or 6.5% is settled (buildings or roads), 0.01 km^{2} (2.5 acres) or 0.1% is either rivers or lakes and 0.01 km^{2} (2.5 acres) or 0.1% is unproductive land.

Of the built up area, housing and buildings made up 3.6% and transportation infrastructure made up 1.5%. Out of the forested land, 16.2% of the total land area is heavily forested and 2.3% is covered with orchards or small clusters of trees. Of the agricultural land, 43.3% is used for growing crops and 30.2% is pastures, while 1.1% is used for orchards or vine crops. All the water in the municipality is flowing water.

The municipality is located in the Sense district. It consists of the village of St. Ursen and a number of hamlets.

== Coat of arms ==
The blazon of the municipal coat of arms is Gules a Cross bottony Argent in chief between two Swords in saltire of the same hilted and pommed Or.

== Demographics ==
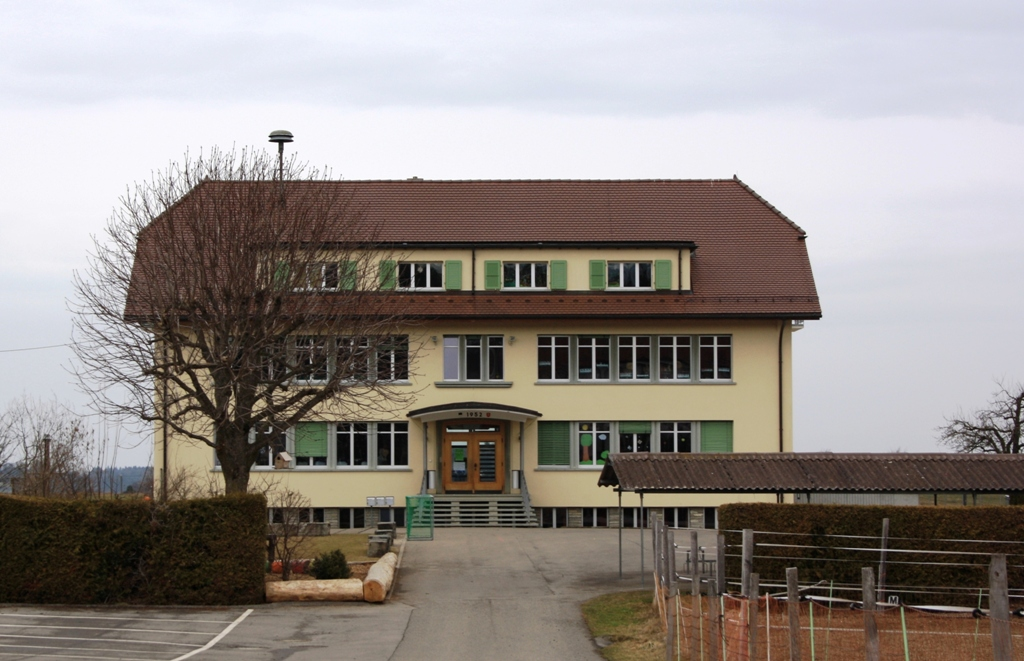
St. Ursen school house

St. Ursen has a population (as of December 2020) of 1,365. As of 2008, 5.0% of the population are resident foreign nationals. Over the last 10 years (2000–2010) the population has changed at a rate of 7.2%. Migration accounted for 3.3%, while births and deaths accounted for 1.1%.

Most of the population (as of 2000) speaks German (1,045 or 89.9%) as their first language, French is the second most common (103 or 8.9%) and Portuguese is the third (6 or 0.5%). There are 2 people who speak Italian.

As of 2008, the population was 50.6% male and 49.4% female. The population was made up of 580 Swiss men (47.7% of the population) and 36 (3.0%) non-Swiss men. There were 578 Swiss women (47.5%) and 23 (1.9%) non-Swiss women. Of the population in the municipality, 469 or about 40.4% were born in St. Ursen and lived there in 2000. There were 460 or 39.6% who were born in the same canton, while 152 or 13.1% were born somewhere else in Switzerland, and 49 or 4.2% were born outside of Switzerland.

As of 2000, children and teenagers (0–19 years old) make up 26.9% of the population, while adults (20–64 years old) make up 57.2% and seniors (over 64 years old) make up 15.8%.

As of 2000, there were 567 people who were single and never married in the municipality. There were 501 married individuals, 68 widows or widowers and 26 individuals who are divorced.

As of 2000, there were 415 private households in the municipality, and an average of 2.7 persons per household. There were 115 households that consist of only one person and 55 households with five or more people. In 2000, a total of 407 apartments (90.8% of the total) were permanently occupied, while 27 apartments (6.0%) were seasonally occupied and 14 apartments (3.1%) were empty. As of 2009, the construction rate of new housing units was 1.6 new units per 1000 residents.

The historical population is given in the following chart:

== Heritage sites of national significance ==
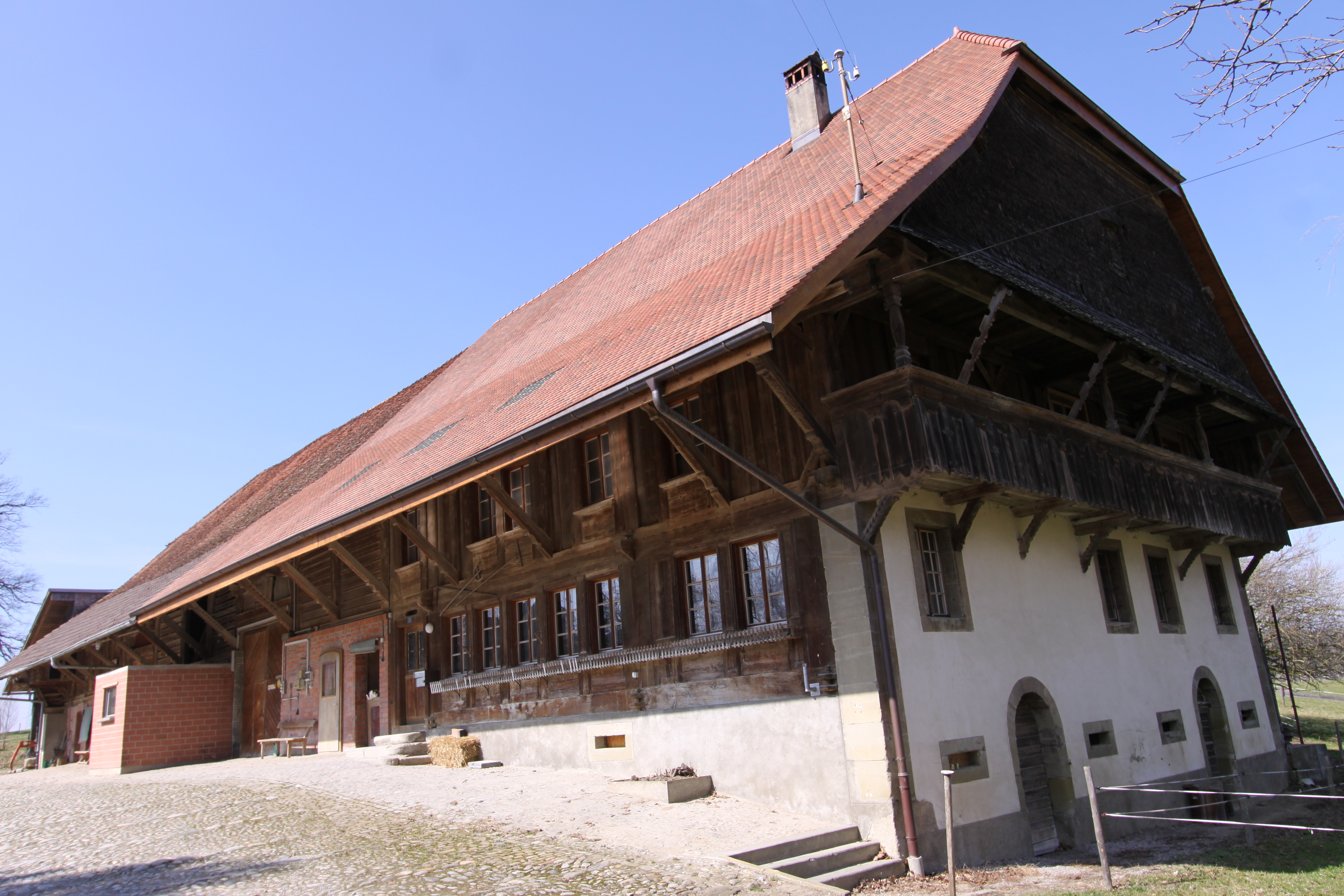
Farmhouse of Joseph von der Weid

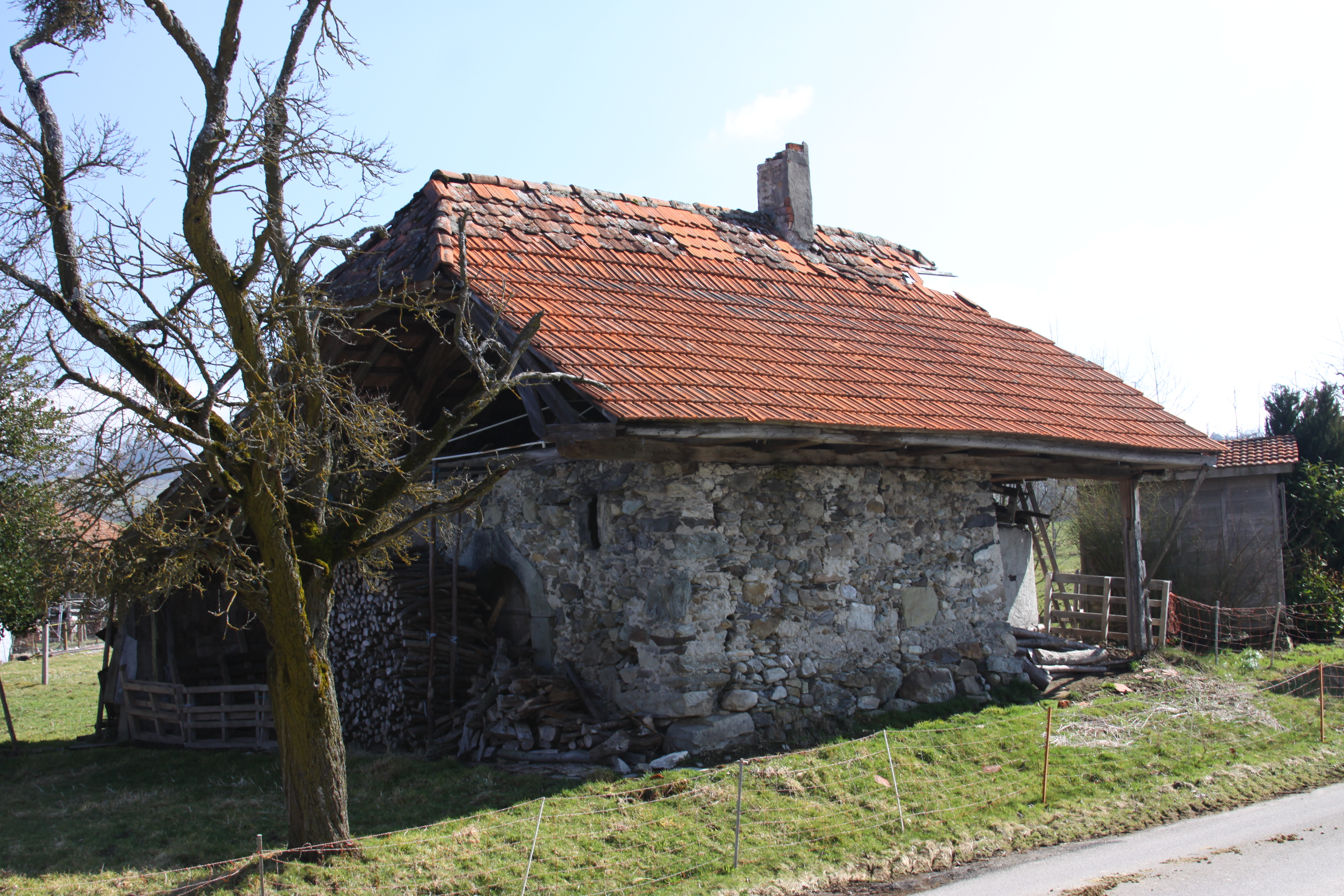
Ofenhaus

The Farm House of Joseph Von of the Weid and the Ofenhaus are listed as Swiss heritage site of national significance.

=== Sights ===
The St.-Ursus-Chapel was built in 1539 and has been restored extensively in 1988. It features decorative paintings inside which date back to 1606. There are several old farming houses from the 17th to the 19th century in the heart of the village as well as in the hamlets surrounding the village.

Besides the farming houses, there are some manors in these hamlets. The most noteworthy of these manors is the Hattenberg castle, which was built in 1679.

== Politics ==
In the 2011 federal election the most popular party was the CVP which received 26.8% of the vote. The next three most popular parties were the SVP (20.7%), the SPS (16.6%) and the FDP (11.2%).

The CVP received about the same percentage of the vote as they did in the 2007 Federal election (27.0% in 2007 vs 26.8% in 2011). The SVP moved from third in 2007 (with 16.6%) to second in 2011, the SPS moved from below fourth place in 2007 to third and the FDP retained about the same popularity (13.8% in 2007). A total of 509 votes were cast in this election.

== Economy ==
Throughout the first half of the 20th century, St. Ursen was agrarian-oriented. Still today, dairy farming and cattle raising are an important branch of economic activity. The village has several dairies. Furthermore, there are number of gravel pits. However, by now the village is mainly a residential community and a significant part of the population is commuting to the cities of Fribourg and Bern.

As of 2010, St. Ursen had an unemployment rate of 1.8%. As of 2008, there were 147 people employed in the primary economic sector and about 54 businesses involved in this sector. 69 people were employed in the secondary sector and there were 13 businesses in this sector. 143 people were employed in the tertiary sector, with 33 businesses in this sector. There were 584 residents of the municipality who were employed in some capacity, of which females made up 39.2% of the workforce.

In 2008 the total number of full-time equivalent jobs was 280. The number of jobs in the primary sector was 104, all of which were in agriculture. The number of jobs in the secondary sector was 63 of which 27 or (42.9%) were in manufacturing and 36 (57.1%) were in construction. The number of jobs in the tertiary sector was 113. In the tertiary sector; 25 or 22.1% were in wholesale or retail sales or the repair of motor vehicles, 37 or 32.7% were in the movement and storage of goods, 3 or 2.7% were in a hotel or restaurant, 1 was the insurance or financial industry, 12 or 10.6% were technical professionals or scientists, 7 or 6.2% were in education and 1 was in health care.

In 2000, there were 108 workers who commuted into the municipality and 414 workers who commuted away. The municipality is a net exporter of workers, with about 3.8 workers leaving the municipality for every one entering. Of the working population, 10.1% used public transportation to get to work, and 60.3% used a private car.

== Religion ==
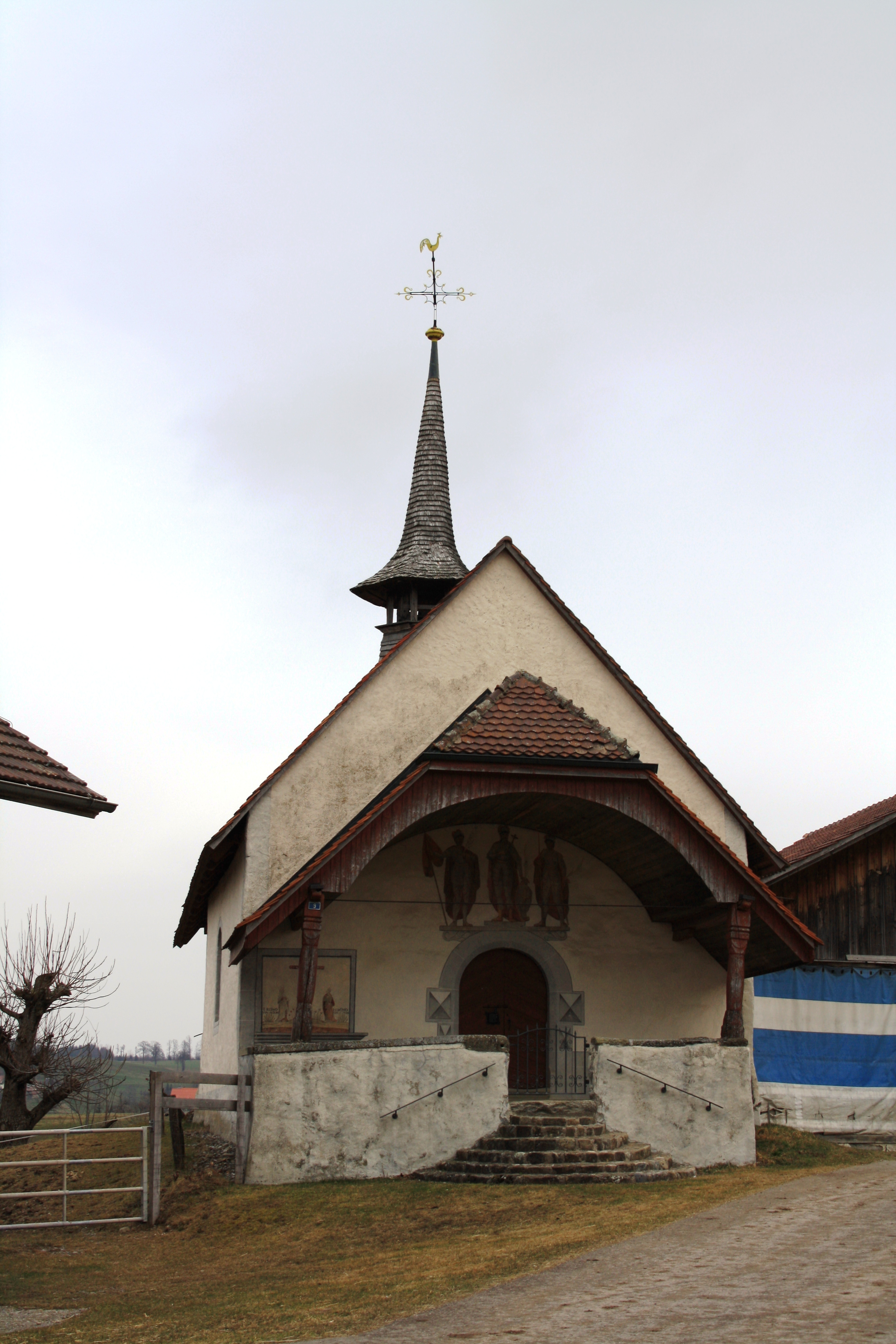
St.-Ursus-Chapel

From the 2000 census, 904 or 77.8% were Roman Catholic, while 194 or 16.7% belonged to the Swiss Reformed Church. Of the rest of the population, there were 4 members of an Orthodox church (or about 0.34% of the population), and there was 1 individual who belongs to another Christian church. There were 3 (or about 0.26% of the population) who were Islamic. There was 1 person who was Buddhist, 1 person who was Hindu and 1 individual who belonged to another church. 30 (or about 2.58% of the population) belonged to no church, are agnostic or atheist, and 23 individuals (or about 1.98% of the population) did not answer the question.

== Education ==
In St. Ursen about 380 or (32.7%) of the population have completed non-mandatory upper secondary education, and 147 or (12.7%) have completed additional higher education (either university or a Fachhochschule). Of the 147 who completed tertiary schooling, 58.5% were Swiss men, 34.7% were Swiss women, 3.4% were non-Swiss men and 3.4% were non-Swiss women.

The Canton of Fribourg school system provides one year of non-obligatory Kindergarten, followed by six years of Primary school. This is followed by three years of obligatory lower Secondary school where the students are separated according to ability and aptitude. Following the lower Secondary students may attend a three or four year optional upper Secondary school. The upper Secondary school is divided into gymnasium (university preparatory) and vocational programs. After they finish the upper Secondary program, students may choose to attend a Tertiary school or continue their apprenticeship.

During the 2010-11 school year, there were a total of 91 students attending 5 classes in St. Ursen. A total of 224 students from the municipality attended any school, either in the municipality or outside of it. There was one kindergarten class with a total of 19 students in the municipality. The municipality had 4 primary classes and 72 students. During the same year, there were no lower secondary classes in the municipality, but 54 students attended lower secondary school in a neighboring municipality. There were no upper Secondary classes or vocational classes, but there were 30 upper Secondary students and 37 upper Secondary vocational students who attended classes in another municipality. The municipality had no non-university Tertiary classes, but there were 2 non-university Tertiary students and 2 specialized Tertiary students who attended classes in another municipality.

As of 2000, there were 105 students from St. Ursen who attended schools outside the municipality.
