= San Silvestre =

San Silvestre (Italian and Spanish for Saint Sylvester) can refer to:

- San Silvestre de Guzmán, Spain
- San Silvestre School, Lima, Peru
- San Silvestre Vallecana
- A frazione of Silvi, Abruzzo

== See also ==
- San Silvestro in Capite
