= Saint Sylvester =

Saint Sylvester or Silvester may refer to:

- Pope Sylvester I (285–335), pope and Christian saint
  - New Year's Eve, Saint Silvester's feast day
  - Saint Silvester Marathon, street running competition in Brazil
  - San Silvestre Vallecana, street running competition in Spain
  - St. Sylvester, Schwabing, a church dedicated to the saint
- Sylvester of Kiev (died 1123), Orthodox clergyman and writer in Kievan Rus'
- Sylvester Gozzolini (died 1267), Italian Catholic priest and founder of the Silvestrini
- St. Silvester, a commune in Switzerland

== See also ==
- San Silvestre (disambiguation)
- San Silvestro (disambiguation)
- Saint-Sylvestre (disambiguation)
