= San Silvestro =

San Silvestro may refer to:

- San Silvestro in Capite, church in Rome
- San Silvestro al Quirinale, church in Rome
- San Silvestro, Venice, church in Venice
- Chiesa di San Silvestro, in Viterbo

== See also ==
- Saint Sylvester (disambiguation)
