= Sylwester =

Sylwester is the Polish form of Sylvester. Notable people with the name include:

== Given name ==
- Sylwester Ambroziak (born 1964), Polish sculptor
- Sylwester Bednarek (born 1989), Polish high jumper
- Sylwester Braun (1909–1996), Polish photographer, Home Army officer
- Sylwester Chęciński (born 1930), Polish film and television director
- Sylwester Chruszcz (born 1972), Polish politician and Member of the European Parliament
- Sylwester Czereszewski (born 1971), Polish footballer
- Sylwester Czopek (born 1958), Polish rector
- Sylwester Janiszewski (born 1988), Polish racing cyclist
- Sylwester Janowski (born 1976), Polish footballer
- Sylwester Kaliski (1925–1978), Polish engineer and general
- Sylwester Królikowski (born 1950), Polish fencer
- Sylwester Kubica (1949–2018), Polish gymnast
- Sylwester Lusiusz (born 1999), Polish footballer
- Sylwester Maciejewski (born 1955), Polish actor
- Sylwester Patejuk (born 1982), Polish footballer
- Sylwester Pawłowski (born 1958), Polish politician
- Sylwester Porowski (born 1938), Polish physicist specializing in solid-state and high-pressure physics
- Sylwester Sembratowicz (1836–1898), Polish-born archbishop
- Sylwester Szmyd (born 1978), Polish professional road bicycle racer
- Sylwester Wilczek (born 1936), Polish ice hockey player and coach
- Sylwester Zych (1950–1989), Polish priest

== Surname ==
- Robert Sylwester (1927–2016), Emeritus Professor of Education at the University of Oregon in the US

== See also ==
- Sylwester Glacier, Antarctic glacier flowing north between Jacobs Nunatak and MacAlpine Hills into Law Glacier, named after David L. Sylwester
