= Sylvestre =

Sylvestre can refer to:

== People ==
=== Middle name ===
- Carlos Sylvestre Begnis (1903–1980), Argentine medical doctor and politician
- Philippe Sylvestre Dufour (1622–1687), French Protestant apothecary, banker, collector, and author
- Jean-Pierre Sylvestre de Grateloup (1782–1862), French physician and naturalist
- Marie Nicolas Sylvestre Guillon (1760–1847), French ecclesiastic
- Étienne Pierre Sylvestre Ricard (1771–1843), French military commander
- Jean François Sylvestre Denis de Trobriand (1765–1799), French naval officer and navigator

== See also ==
- Saint-Sylvestre (disambiguation)
- Silvestre (disambiguation)
- Sylvester (disambiguation)
