= Saint-Sylvestre =

Saint-Sylvestre may refer to:

- Saint-Sylvestre, Quebec
- Saint-Sylvestre, Ardèche, France
- Saint-Sylvestre, Haute-Savoie, France
- Saint-Sylvestre, Haute-Vienne, France

== See also ==
- Pope Sylvester I, honored in the Catholic Church and the Eastern Orthodox Churches as Saint Sylvester
- Saint Sylvester (disambiguation)
- Saint-Sylvestre-Cappel, Nord, France
- Saint-Sylvestre coup d'état
- Saint-Sylvestre-de-Cormeilles, Eure, France
- Saint-Sylvestre-Pragoulin, Puy-de-Dôme, France
- Saint-Sylvestre-sur-Lot, Lot-et-Garonne, France
- Sylvestre (disambiguation)
