= St. Silvester =

- Municipality
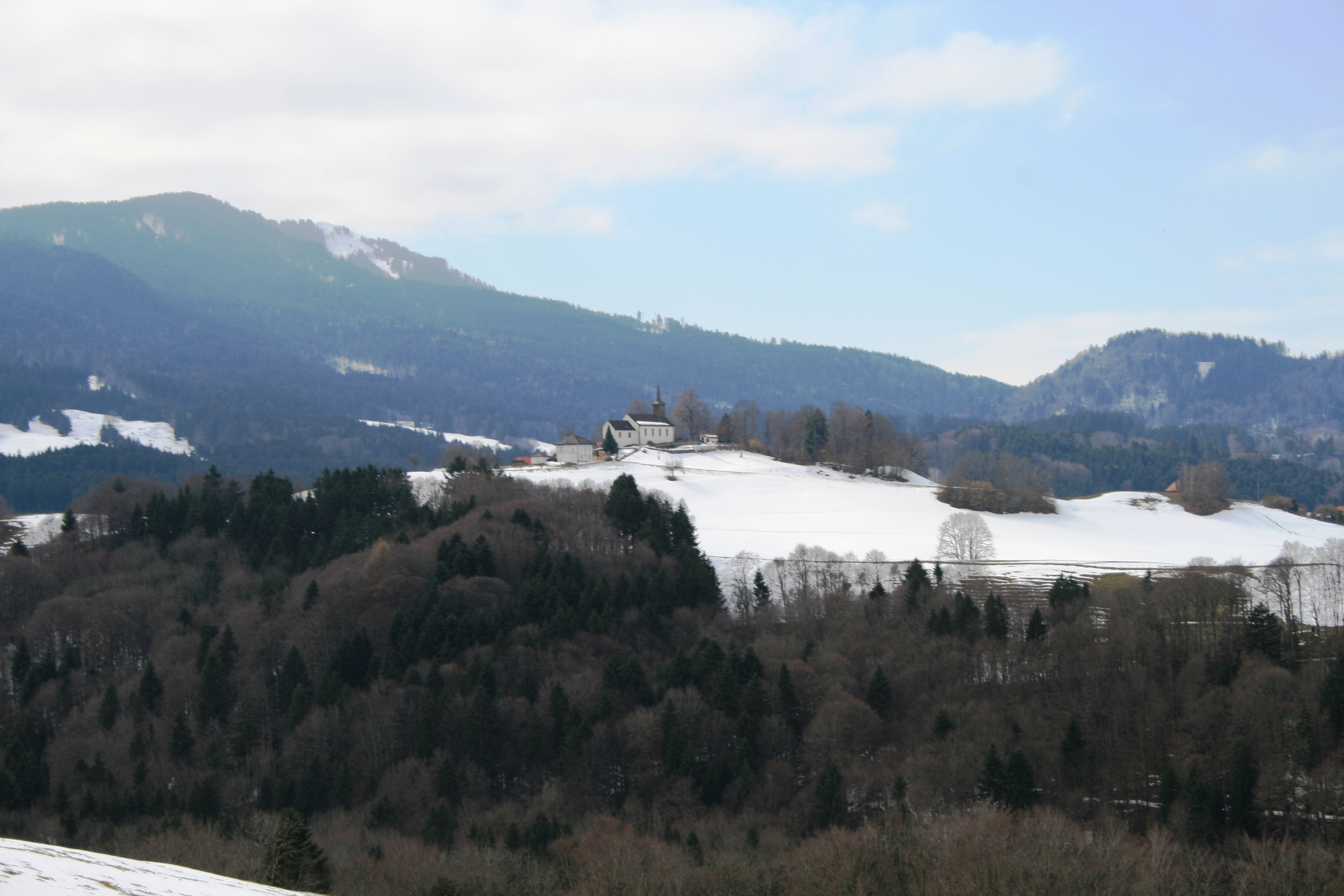
- St. Silvester church

- Coat of arms
- Location of St. Silvester
- Location within Switzerland Location within Canton of Fribourg
- Coordinates: 46°44′N 7°13′E
- Country: Switzerland
- Canton: Fribourg
- District: Sense

Government
  - Mayor: Gemeindeammann

Area
  - Total: 7.1 km^{2} (2.7 sq mi)
- Elevation: 848 m (2,782 ft)

Population (December 2020)
  - Total: 952
  - Density: 130/km^{2} (350/sq mi)
- Time zone: UTC+01:00 (CET)
  - Summer (DST): UTC+02:00 (CEST)
- Postal code: 1736
- SFOS number: 2303
- ISO 3166 code: CH-FR
- Surrounded by: Giffers, Le Mouret, Plasselb, Tentlingen
- Website: www.stsilvester.ch

St. Silvester (French: Saint-Silvestre; Arpitan: Sent-Savéthro [ʃɛ̃ ʃaˈviθʁo]) is a municipality in the district of Sense in the canton of Fribourg in Switzerland. It is one of the municipalities with a large majority of German speakers in the mostly French speaking Canton of Fribourg.

== History ==
St. Silvester is first mentioned in 1148 as sancto Silvestro und Baselgin.

== Geography ==
St. Silvester has an area of 7.04 km^{2} (2.72 sq mi). Of this area, 3.74 km^{2} (1.44 mi^{2}) or 52.9% is used for agricultural purposes, while 2.65 km^{2} (1.02 mi^{2}) or 37.5% is forested. Of the rest of the land, 0.56 km^{2} (0.22 mi^{2}) or 7.9% is settled (buildings or roads), 0.14 km^{2} (35 acres) or 2.0% is either rivers or lakes and 0.01 km^{2} (2.5 acres) or 0.1% is unproductive land.

Of the built up area, housing and buildings made up 5.1% and transportation infrastructure made up 2.3%. Out of the forested land, 35.2% of the total land area is heavily forested and 2.3% is covered with orchards or small clusters of trees. Of the agricultural land, 10.6% is used for growing crops and 33.1% is pastures and 8.6% is used for alpine pastures. All the water in the municipality is flowing water.

The municipality is located in the Sense district, and consists of a number of hamlets.

== Coat of arms ==
The blazon of the municipal coat of arms is Azure on a mount Vert a Church between two Trees proper. The church on the coat of arms is the municipal parish church.

== Demographics ==
St. Silvester has a population (as of December 2020) of 952. As of 2008, 1.1% of the population are resident foreign nationals. Over the last 10 years (2000–2010) the population has changed at a rate of -4.7%. Migration accounted for -7.3%, while births and deaths accounted for 2.2%.

Most of the population (as of 2000) speaks German (905 or 94.8%) as their first language, French is the second most common (41 or 4.3%) and Polish is the third with 2 people (0.2%). There is 1 person who speaks Italian.

As of 2008, the population was 49.8% male and 50.2% female. The population was made up of 456 Swiss men (49.5% of the population) and 3 (0.3%) non-Swiss men. There were 455 Swiss women (49.4%) and 7 (0.8%) non-Swiss women. Of the population in the municipality, 479 or about 50.2% were born in St. Silvester and lived there in 2000. There were 306 or 32.0% who were born in the same canton, while 99 or 10.4% were born somewhere else in Switzerland, and 35 or 3.7% were born outside of Switzerland.

As of 2000, children and teenagers (0–19 years old) make up 26.8% of the population, while adults (20–64 years old) make up 64.9% and seniors (over 64 years old) make up 8.3%.

As of 2000, there were 432 people who were single and never married in the municipality. There were 457 married individuals, 40 widows or widowers and 26 individuals who are divorced.

As of 2000, there were 334 private households in the municipality, and an average of 2.8 persons per household. There were 64 households that consist of only one person and 41 households with five or more people. In 2000, a total of 321 apartments (96.1% of the total) were permanently occupied, while 9 apartments (2.7%) were seasonally occupied and 4 apartments (1.2%) were empty. As of 2009, the construction rate of new housing units was 8.6 new units per 1000 residents. The vacancy rate for the municipality, in 2010, was 3.25%.

The historical population is given in the following chart:

== Politics ==
In the 2011 federal election the most popular party was the SVP which received 38.7% of the vote. The next three most popular parties were the FDP (18.9%), the SPS (13.0%) and the CVP (12.0%).

The SVP gained an additional 8.6% of the vote from the 2007 Federal election (30.1% in 2007 vs 38.7% in 2011). The FDP lost popularity (24.8% in 2007), the SPS moved from below fourth place in 2007 to third and the CVP moved from third in 2007 (with 18.8%) to fourth. A total of 338 votes were cast in this election, of which 2 or 0.6% were invalid.

== Economy ==
As of 2010, St. Silvester had an unemployment rate of 0.5%. As of 2008, there were 55 people employed in the primary economic sector and about 25 businesses involved in this sector. 11 people were employed in the secondary sector and there were 7 businesses in this sector. 57 people were employed in the tertiary sector, with 14 businesses in this sector. There were 509 residents of the municipality who were employed in some capacity, of which females made up 37.1% of the workforce.

In 2008 the total number of full-time equivalent jobs was 80. The number of jobs in the primary sector was 32, all of which were in agriculture. The number of jobs in the secondary sector was 10 of which 4 were in manufacturing and 6 were in construction. The number of jobs in the tertiary sector was 38. In the tertiary sector; 7 or 18.4% were in wholesale or retail sales or the repair of motor vehicles, 13 or 34.2% were in the movement and storage of goods, 6 or 15.8% were in a hotel or restaurant, 1 was the insurance or financial industry, 1 was a technical professional or scientist, 6 or 15.8% were in education.

In 2000, there were 28 workers who commuted into the municipality and 392 workers who commuted away. The municipality is a net exporter of workers, with about 14.0 workers leaving the municipality for every one entering. Of the working population, 10.2% used public transportation to get to work, and 71.1% used a private car.

== Religion ==
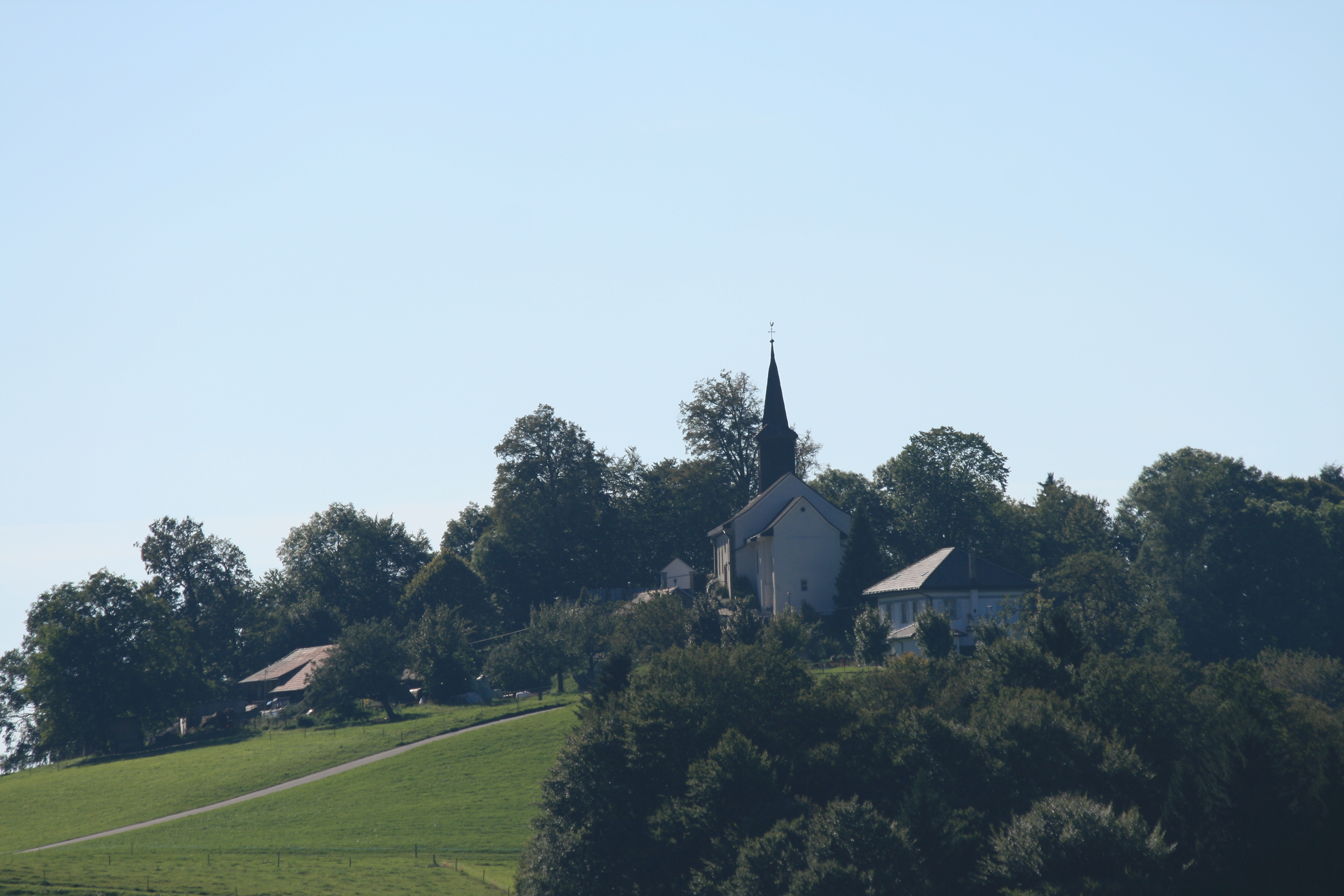
Parish church of St. Silvester

From the 2000 census, 811 or 84.9% were Roman Catholic, while 64 or 6.7% belonged to the Swiss Reformed Church. Of the rest of the population, there were 10 individuals (or about 1.05% of the population) who belonged to another Christian church. There were 3 (or about 0.31% of the population) who were Islamic. There was 1 person who was Buddhist. 33 (or about 3.46% of the population) belonged to no church, are agnostic or atheist, and 38 individuals (or about 3.98% of the population) did not answer the question.

== Education ==
In St. Silvester about 309 or (32.4%) of the population have completed non-mandatory upper secondary education, and 47 or (4.9%) have completed additional higher education (either university or a Fachhochschule). Of the 47 who completed tertiary schooling, 76.6% were Swiss men, 14.9% were Swiss women.

The Canton of Fribourg school system provides one year of non-obligatory Kindergarten, followed by six years of Primary school. This is followed by three years of obligatory lower Secondary school where the students are separated according to ability and aptitude. Following the lower Secondary students may attend a three or four year optional upper Secondary school. The upper Secondary school is divided into gymnasium (university preparatory) and vocational programs. After they finish the upper Secondary program, students may choose to attend a Tertiary school or continue their apprenticeship.

During the 2010-11 school year, there were a total of 87 students attending 4 classes in St. Silvester. A total of 166 students from the municipality attended any school, either in the municipality or outside of it. There was one kindergarten class with a total of 23 students in the municipality. The municipality had 3 primary classes and 64 students. During the same year, there were no lower secondary classes in the municipality, but 44 students attended lower secondary school in a neighboring municipality. There were no upper Secondary classes or vocational classes, but there were 8 upper Secondary students and 29 upper Secondary vocational students who attended classes in another municipality. The municipality had no non-university Tertiary classes, but there was one non-university Tertiary student who attended classes in another municipality.

As of 2000, there were 54 students from St. Silvester who attended schools outside the municipality.
