= Silvestre =

Silvestre is a Spanish and Portuguese given name or surname, or a French surname. Notable people with the name include:

== Surname ==
- Armando Silvestre (1926–2024), American and Mexican actor
- Cindy Silvestre (born 1993), French kickboxer
- Franck Silvestre (born 1967), French footballer
- Isac Silvestre (born 2006), Brazilian footballer
- Israel Silvestre (1621–1691; called the Younger to distinguish him from his father), prolific French draftsman
- José Plaridel Silvestre, writer and senior official of the Boy Scouts of the Philippines
- Louis de Silvestre (1675–1760), French portrait and history painter, (son of Israel Silvestre)
- Manuel Silvestre (born 1965), former Spanish water polo player
- Matías Silvestre (born 1984), Argentine football (soccer) player
- Mikaël Silvestre (born 1977), French football (soccer) player
- Paul Armand Silvestre (1837–1901), French poet and conteur

Part of combined surname

- Manuel Fernández Silvestre (1871–1921), Spanish military general
- Antoine Isaac Silvestre de Sacy (1758–1838), French linguist and orientalist
- Paulo Sérgio Silvestre do Nascimento (born 1969), former Brazilian footballer

Fictional

- José Silvestre, character in H. Rider Haggard's adventure novel King Solomon's Mines (1885)

== Given name ==
- Silvestre S. Herrera
- Silvestre Igoa
- Silvestre Selva
- Silvestre Pinheiro (born 1984), Portuguese football player
- Silvestre Rasuk
- Silvestre Reyes
- Silvestre Dangond
- Silvestre Vélez de Escalante
- Silvestre Siale Bileka

== See also ==
- Silvestre, Rio de Janeiro, a neighborhood in Rio de Janeiro
- Encina de San Silvestre
- San Silvestre School
- San Silvestre Vallecana
- Silvestre (film), a 1981 Portuguese drama
