= List of raised and transitional bogs of Switzerland =

This is a list of raised and transitional bogs of Switzerland. It is based on the Federal Inventory of Raised and Transitional Bogs of National Importance. The inventory is part of a 1991 Ordinance of the Swiss Federal Council implementing the Federal Law on the Protection of Nature and Cultural Heritage.

== Inventory of raised and transitional bogs of national importance ==
Nb	Site	Municipalities	Canton(s)	From	rev.
163	Gontenmoos	Gonten	AI	1991	
164	Helchen	Appenzell, Schwende	AI	1991	
601	Nisplismoos	Appenzell, Rüte	AI	1991	
602	Hütten	Gonten	AI	1991	
603	Vordere Wartegg	Schwende	AI	1991	
604	Löchli	Gonten	AI	1991	
139	Cholwald Schwägalp	Hundwil, Urnäsch	AR	1991	
143	Forenmösli/Burketwald/ Paradisli	Urnäsch	AR	1991	
144	Bruggerenwald	Urnäsch	AR	1991	
145	Stillert	Urnäsch	AR	1991	
165	Suruggen/Chellersegg	Trogen	AR	1991	
166	Hofguetmoor	Gais	AR	1991	
168	Forenmoos/Schachenmoos	Gais	AR	1991	
537	Untere Fischeren	Urnäsch	AR	1991	
580	Moor südöstlich Beldschwendi	Schwellbrunn	AR	1991	
581	Guggenhalden	Urnäsch	AR	1991	
582	Moor auf dem Schwarzenberg	Urnäsch	AR	1991	
583	Moor nordwestlich Gisleren/Schönauwald	Urnäsch	AR	1991	
592	Breitmoos	Urnäsch	AR	1991	
596	Moore zwischen Alp Stöck und Gschwend	Urnäsch	AR	1991	
597	Moor zwischen Telleren und Chli Langboden	Urnäsch	AR	1991	
82	Taumoos	Niederrohrdorf	AG	1991	
83	Fischbacher Moos	Fischbach-Göslikon	AG	1991	
146	Potersalp	Hundwil, Schwende	AR, AI	1991	2003
167	Hirschberg	Gais, Rüte	AR, AI	1991	
138	Moore auf dem Chräzerenpass (Schwarzegg, Lauchriet, Witiriet)	Hundwil, Krummenau	AR, SG	1991	2003
180	Siehenmoos	Eggiwil	BE	1991	
181	Flüegfääl/Steinmoos	Eggiwil	BE	1991	
182	Pfaffenmoos	Eggiwil	BE	1991	
183	Hängstmoor	Eriz	BE	1991	
184	Rotmoos	Eriz	BE	1991	
185	Vorderes Rotmösli	Eriz	BE	1991	
186	Fischbachmoos/Obermoos	Oberlangenegg	BE	1991	
187	Moos bei Wachseldorn/Untermoos	Wachseldorn	BE	1991	
188	Wachseldornmoos	Buchholterberg	BE	1991	
193	Moore nördlich Grünenbergpass	Eriz, Habkern	BE	1991	
194	Moore südwestlich Grünenbergpass	Beatenberg, Habkern	BE	1991	
195	Trogenmoos	Habkern	BE	1991	
196	Moore im Schöpfewald	Habkern	BE	1991	
197	Luegiboden	Habkern	BE	1991	
198	Moore östlich Aellgäuli	Habkern	BE	1991	
199	Möser östlich Widegg	Habkern	BE	1991	
200	Moore im Steiniwald	Habkern	BE	1991	
302	Turen/Chaltenbrunnen/Stäckewäldli	Meiringen, Schattenhalb	BE	1991	2003
328	Witiwald/Dälenwald	Beatenberg	BE	2003	
330	Lischboden	Rüschegg	BE	1991	
331	Schalenberg	Rüschegg	BE	1991	
332	Schwändlibachgraben	Rüeggisberg	BE	1991	
333	Sortel	Guggisberg, Rüschegg	BE	1991	
334	Grossfischbächen	Rüschegg	BE	1991	
335	Ladengrat	Guggisberg	BE	1991	
336	Hinters Läger	Habkern	BE	1991	
337	Moorwald Hinters Läger	Habkern	BE	1991	
338	Moor nördlich Oberes Hörnli	Sigriswil	BE	1991	
339	Moor nordöstlich Oberes Hörnli	Horrenbach-Buchen, Sigriswil	BE	1991	
340	Moor südwestlich Steinige Schöriz	Horrenbach-Buchen	BE	1991	
341	Moor westlich Steinige Schöriz	Horrenbach-Buchen	BE	1991	
342	Gmeine Schöriz	Horrenbach-Buchen	BE	1991	
343	Stouffe	Horrenbach-Buchen	BE	1991	
348	Moore westlich Bütlerschwandgraben	Schangnau	BE	2003	
350	Grüöbiwald	Hasliberg	BE	2003	
354	Harzisboden	Habkern	BE	2003	
355	Moore bei Unter Hungerschwand	Eriz	BE	2003	
501	Moor südlich Möser	Habkern	BE	1991	
502	Moor nordöstlich Färrich am Bol	Habkern	BE	1991	
503	Moore südöstlich Färrich am Bol	Habkern	BE	1991	
504	Moor zwischen Flösch und Hälibach	Beatenberg	BE	1991	
505	Moor oberhalb Burgfeldflüe	Beatenberg	BE	1991	
506	Moore östlich Gemmenalp	Beatenberg	BE	1991	
507	Moor im Unterholz/Waldegg	Beatenberg	BE	1991	
508	Moor bei Lombachalp	Habkern	BE	1991	
509	Moor zwischen Lombachalp und Teufengraben	Habkern	BE	1991	
510	Esleren/Gummenalp	Hofstetten bei Brienz	BE	1991	
511	Höhenschwandmoor	Hasliberg	BE	1991	2003
512	Moore hinder der Egg	Hasliberg	BE	1991	
513	Seelein bei der Mägisalp/Seemad	Hasliberg	BE	1991	
514	In Miseren	Gadmen	BE	1991	
515	Feldmoos/Moore auf dem Feldmooshubel	Gadmen	BE	1991	
516	Moor oberhalb Cholischwand	Gadmen	BE	1991	
517	Breitmoos	Grindelwald	BE	1991	
518	Moore und Seen bei Burstblätz	Grindelwald	BE	1991	
519	Moor beim Fysteren Graben	Grindelwald	BE	1991	
520	Moor bei Aelbi Flue	Grindelwald	BE	1991	
521	Moor nordöstlich Hohchräjen	Grindelwald	BE	1991	
522	Feldmoos	Grindelwald	BE	1991	
523	Moor nordöstlich Mettlen	Grindelwald	BE	1991	
524	Selenen	Rüschegg	BE	1991	
525	Rotmoos	Rüti bei Riggisberg	BE	1991	
526	Moor östlich Wissenbach/Gurnigel	Rüschegg	BE	1991	
527	Moor westlich Wissenbach/Gurnigel	Rüschegg	BE	1991	
528	Ägelsee-Moor auf dem Diemtigbergli	Diemtigen	BE	1991	
529	Moor nördlich Toffelsweid	Boltigen	BE	1991	
534	Zettenalp	Sigriswil	BE	1991	
535	Moor östlich Unteres Hörnli	Horrenbach-Buchen, Sigriswil	BE	1991	
541	Schluchhole	Eriz	BE	1991	
542	Horneggwald	Horrenbach-Buchen	BE	1991	
543	Moore zwischen Mirrenegg und Aellgäuli	Oberried am Brienzersee	BE	1991	2003
557	Chuchifang	Boltigen	BE	1991	
558	Sparemoos/Tots Mädli	Zweisimmen	BE	1991	
559	Moore südwestlich Tolmoos	Boltigen, Zweisimmen	BE	1991	
560	Saanenmöser/Dälweid	Saanen	BE	1991	
561	Lauenensee	Lauenen	BE	1991	
562	Moore auf Betelberg	Lenk	BE	1991	
563	Moore südöstlich Haslerberg	Lenk	BE	1991	
564	Dälmoos Achseten	Frutigen	BE	1991	
565	Filfalle	Kandersteg	BE	1991	
566	Chänelegg	Lauterbrunnen	BE	1991	
567	Träjen	Innertkirchen	BE	1991	
571	Moor oberhalb Geilsbüel (Hahnenmoospass)	Adelboden	BE	1991	
572	Bruchsee auf dem Jaunpass	Boltigen	BE	1991	
606	Understeinberg	Lauterbrunnen	BE	1991	
607	Station Wengernalp	Lauterbrunnen	BE	1991	
608	Dürrentännli	Rüschegg	BE	1991	
609	Rüwlispass	St. Stephan	BE	1991	
1	La Sagne et les Tourbières de Bellelay	Saicourt	BE	1991	
10	Tourbières de la Chaux d'Abel	Saint-Imier, Sonvilier	BE	1991	
11	Les Pontins	Saint-Imier	BE	1991	
41	La Tourbière/Ronde Sagne	Tramelan	BE	1991	
42	Pâturage du Droit	Tramelan	BE	1991	
55	Champ Meusel	Saint-Imier	BE	1991	
70	Gänsenmoos	Wahlern	BE	1991	
71	Lörmoos	Wohlen bei Bern	BE	1991	
72	Büsselimoos	Kirchlindach	BE	1991	
73	Heidmoos	Hindelbank	BE	1991	
74	Meienmoos	Burgdorf, Lyssach	BE	1991	
75	Sewelimoos (Hochmoor Seeliswald)	Reutigen	BE	1991	
76	Chlepfimoos/Burgmoos	Niederönz, Oberönz	BE	1991	
2	Etang de la Gruère	Tramelan, Le Bémont, Montfaucon, Saignelégier	BE, JU	1991	
3	La Tourbière de la Chaux-des-Breuleux	Mont Tramelan, Tramelan, La Chaux-des-Breuleux, Saignelégier	BE, JU	1991	
113	Gros Mont	Charmey	FR	1991	
126	Tourbière des Alpettes	Semsales	FR	1991	
127	Niremont, Arête ouest	Semsales	FR	1991	
128	Niremont, Arête nord	Semsales	FR	1991	
129	Tourbière au sud-est de Fruence	Châtel-Saint-Denis	FR	1991	
130	Dévin des Dailles	Châtel-Saint-Denis	FR	1991	2003
131	Lac de Lussy	Châtel-Saint-Denis	FR	1991	2003
327	Marais au nord du Petit Niremont	Châtel-Saint-Denis	FR	2003	
358	Pré aux Oies	Hauteville	FR	2003	
359	Wusta	Plasselb	FR	2003	
544	Tourbières dans la forêt du Frachy	Cerniat	FR	1991	
545	Tourbière à l'ouest de la Joux d'Allière	Hauteville	FR	1991	
546	Tourbière au Pâquier dessus	Hauteville	FR	1991	
547	Pré Colard	Cerniat, Hauteville	FR	1991	
548	La Spielmannda/Untertierliberg	Cerniat	FR	1991	
555	Muschenegg	Plasselb	FR	1991	
556	Rigeli	La Roche	FR	1991	
570	Petit Sauvage	Vaulruz	FR	1991	
576	Moore am Schwyberg (Einzugsgebiet des Rotenbaches)	Planfayon	FR	1991	2003
58	Les Gurles/Les Communs de Maules	Marsens, Sâles	FR	1991	
59	Les Mosses-Rosez	Sâles (Gruyère), Vaulruz	FR	1991	
61	Les Tourbières	Fiaugères, Porsel	FR	1991	
62	Les Grands Marais	Les Ecasseys	FR	1991	
63	La Mosse d'en Bas	Le Crêt	FR	1991	
64	Les Bouleyres	La Tour-de-Trême	FR	1991	
65	Schwandholz	St. Ursen	FR	1991	
66	Rotmoos	Rechthalten, St. Ursen	FR	1991	
67	La Tourbière d'Echarlens	Echarlens	FR	1991	
68	Entenmoos	Rechthalten	FR	1991	
69	Düdingermoos	Guin	FR	1991	
60	Les Mosses de la Rogivue	Saint-Martin, La Rogivue	FR, VD	1991	
245	Gross Moos im Schwendital	Oberurnen	GL	1991	
246	Boggenberg	Näfels, Oberurnen	GL	1991	
247	Etzelhüsli	Haslen	GL	1991	
248	Grotzenbüel (Braunwald)	Braunwald	GL	1991	
422	Garichti	Schwanden	GL	1991	
427	Matt oberhalb Stausee Garichti	Schwanden	GL	1991	
441	Mürtschen	Obstalden	GL	1991	
492	Längriet	Engi, Matt	GL	2003	
216	Caischavedra	Disentis/Mustér	GR	1991	
217	Palius (Val Mutschnengia)	Medel (Lucmagn)	GR	1991	
218	Alp Nadels	Trun	GR	1991	
219	Tgiern Grond	Trun	GR	1991	
220	Ufem Sand	Vals	GR	1991	
221	Riederen	Obersaxen	GR	1991	
222	Affeier/Pifal	Obersaxen	GR	1991	
223	Suossa	Mesocco	GR	1991	
224	Lagh Doss	Mesocco	GR	1991	
225	Bosch de San Remo	Mesocco	GR	1991	
226	Sass de la Golp (Lucomagno)	Mesocco	GR	1991	
227	Pian Casuleta	Mesocco	GR	1991	
228	Pian di Scignan	Castaneda	GR	1991	
229	Rongg	Furna, Jenaz	GR	1991	
230	Choma Sur	Celerina/Schlarigna	GR	1991	
231	Pè d'Munt/Pradè	Samedan	GR	1991	
232	God Surlej	St. Moritz, Silvaplana	GR	1991	
233	Bosch de la Furcela	Stampa	GR	1991	
234	Passo del Maloja/ Aira da la Palza	Stampa	GR	1991	
235	Lai Neir	Sur	GR	1991	
236	Paleis	Sur	GR	1991	
237	Usserberg	Parpan	GR	1991	
238	Heidsee	Vaz/Obervaz	GR	1991	
239	Sporz Davains	Vaz/Obervaz	GR	1991	
240	Schwarzsee bei Arosa	Arosa	GR	1991	
241	Fulried am Stelserberg	Schiers	GR	1991	
242	Clavadeler Berg	Davos	GR	1991	
243	Horn bei Tratza	Luzein	GR	1991	
253	Choma Suot - Palüd Chapè	Celerina/Schlarigna	GR	1991	
255	Zwischen Malojapass und Val da Pila (Malojariegel)	Stampa	GR	1991	
421	Plansena (Val da Camp)	Poschiavo	GR	1991	
476	Kristalloch	Vals	GR	2003	
478	Pascumier See/Bischolsee	Flerden, Portein, Tschappina	GR	2003	
480	Caritsch	Andeer	GR	2003	
481	Nursera	Andeer	GR	2003	
483	Son Roc	Sur	GR	2003	
486	Muotta da Güvè	Stampa	GR	2003	
488	Plustorna	Luzein	GR	2003	
499	Alp de Mem - Bosch Mosghé	Buseno, San Vittore	GR	2003	
917	Alp Flix	Sur	GR	1991	
921	Lai Nair	Tarasp	GR	1991	
89	Grossweid bei Laret	Davos	GR	1991	
90	Mauntschas	St. Moritz	GR	1991	
91	Stazer Wald	Celerina/Schlarigna	GR	1991	
92	Lej da Staz	Celerina/Schlarigna	GR	1991	
93	Plaun da las Mujas	Celerina/Schlarigna	GR	1991	
599	Tourbière à l'est des Neufs Prés	Montfaucon	JU	1991	
605	La Couaye	Lajoux	JU	1991	
4	La Tourbière au sud des Veaux	Les Genevez	JU	1991	
5	Les Embreux	Les Genevez	JU	1991	
6	Plain de Saigne	Montfaucon	JU	1991	
7	La Tourbière des Enfers	Le Bémont, Les Enfers	JU	1991	
8	La Saigne à l'est des Rouges-Terres	Le Bémont, Montfaucon	JU	1991	
9	Tourbières de Chanteraine	Le Noirmont	JU	1991	
21	Creux de l'Epral	Le Noirmont	JU	1991	
43	Tourbière à l'ouest de Prédame	Les Genevez	JU	1991	
44	Derrière les Embreux	Lajoux	JU	1991	
45	Forêt du Péché	Le Bémont	JU	1991	
46	Les Royes	Le Bémont, Saignelégier	JU	1991	
259	Gürmschwald	Entlebuch	LU	1991	
294	Ober Lauenberg	Entlebuch	LU	1991	
296	Balmoos	Hasle	LU	1991	
297	Rosswängenwald	Entlebuch	LU	1991	
298	Unter Wasserfallen	Hasle	LU	1991	
299	Zwischen Schwand und Gürmschbach	Entlebuch	LU	1991	
301	Hagleren	Flühli	LU	1991	
312	Stächelegg/Ghack	Flühli	LU	1991	
313	Salwidili	Flühli	LU	1991	
314	Zopf/Salwiden	Flühli	LU	1991	
315	Laubersmadghack	Flühli	LU	1991	
316	Türnliwald	Flühli	LU	1991	
317	Gross Gfäl	Flühli	LU	1991	
318	Husegg-Hurnischwand	Flühli	LU	1991	
319	Husegg-Ochsenweid	Flühli	LU	1991	
320	Rossweid	Flühli	LU	1991	
322	Mittlerschwarzenegg	Flühli	LU	1991	
362	Zopf	Flühli	LU	2003	
400	Juchmoos	Hasle	LU	1991	
401	Müllerenmösli	Hasle	LU	1991	
402	Stächtenmösli	Hasle	LU	1991	
403	Zwischen Guggenen und Unter Änggenlauenen	Flühli	LU	1991	
404	Rüchiwald	Flühli	LU	1991	
405	Zwischen Fürsteinwald und Blattli	Flühli	LU	1991	
406	Tuetenseeli	Menznau	LU	1991	
407	Fuchserenmoos/Geugelhusenmoos	Entlebuch	LU	1991	
408	Mettilimoos	Entlebuch	LU	1991	
409	Östlich Brandchnubel	Flühli, Schüpfheim	LU	1991	
410	Tällenmoos	Escholzmatt	LU	1991	
411	Wagliseichnubel	Flühli	LU	1991	
412	Forrenmoos/Meienstossmoos im Eigental	Schwarzenberg	LU	1991	
414	Ehemaliger Pilatussee	Schwarzenberg	LU	1991	
415	Follenwald im Krienser Hohwald	Horw, Kriens	LU	1991	
416	Gibelegg	Kriens	LU	1991	
417	Furenmoos bei der Krienseregg	Kriens	LU	1991	
432	Zwischen Wagliseichnubel und Ghack	Flühli	LU	1991	
435	Fuchseren	Entlebuch	LU	1991	
436	Moos nordwestlich Gibelegg	Kriens	LU	1991	
437	Ausfluss des Rotsees	Ebikon	LU	1991	
443	Vorderes Steinetli	Flühli	LU	1991	
448	Husegg	Flühli	LU	1991	
449	Bärsel	Flühli	LU	1991	
450	Südlich Ober Saffertberg	Flühli	LU	1991	
451	Wagliseiboden	Flühli	LU	1991	
452	Cheiserschwand	Flühli	LU	1991	
453	Zwischen Schlund und Änzihütten	Flühli	LU	1991	
455	Forenmoos im Sigiger Wald	Ruswil	LU	1991	
457	Rischli	Flühli	LU	1991	
464	Buholzer Schwändi	Horw	LU	2003	
470	Ober Gründli	Entlebuch	LU	2003	
471	Äbnistetten	Hasle	LU	1991	
473	Guntlishütten	Flühli	LU	1991	
495	Bründlen	Schwarzenberg	LU	1991	
938	Südlich Grön	Flühli	LU	1991	
939	Tällenmoos im Hilferental	Flühli	LU	1991	
77	Hochmoor bei Etzelwil	Schlierbach	LU	1991	
78	Ballmoos Lieli	Lieli	LU	1991	
257	Zwischen Glaubenberg und Rossalp	Entlebuch, Sarnen	LU, OW	1991	
295	Riedboden	Entlebuch, Alpnach	LU, OW	1991	
568	Les Eplatures-Temple	La Chaux-de-Fonds	NE	1991	
575	Marais de Pouillerel/ Marais Jean Colard	La Chaux-de-Fonds	NE	1991	
12	Les Chauchets	Le Cerneux-Péquignot	NE	1991	
13	Vers le Maix Rochat	La Brévine, Le Cerneux-Péquignot	NE	1991	
14	Les Sagnes-Rouges	Noiraigue	NE	1991	
15	Vallée des Ponts-de-Martel, (Bois des Lattes/Marais Rouge)	Brot-Plamboz, Les Ponts-de-Martel, Travers	NE	1991	2003
16	Tourbières du Cachot (Le Marais/Marais Rouge)	La Chaux-du-Milieu, Le Cerneux-Péquignot	NE	1991	2003
17	Marais de la Châtagne	La Brévine	NE	1991	
18	Rond Buisson	La Brévine	NE	1991	2003
19	Le Marais de la Joux du Plâne	Dombresson	NE	1991	
20	Les Saignolis	La Chaux-de-Fonds, Le Locle, Les Brenets, Les Planchettes	NE	1991	2003/2007
47	La Sagnette/Les Tourbières	Les Verrières	NE	1991	
48	Tourbière près de la Cornée	La Brévine	NE	1991	
49	Le Brouillet	La Brévine	NE	1991	
50	Bémont/Chez Petoud	La Brévine	NE	1991	2003
56	Le Marais/Les Bochats	Môtiers	NE	1991	
57	Les Sagnettes sur Boveresse	Boveresse	NE	1991	
107	Grossriet/Gnappiriet	Stans	NW	1991	
413	Arven unter Fräkmünt	Hergiswil	NW	1991	
433	Scheidegg im Choltal	Emmetten	NW	1991	
434	Seeliboden im Choltal	Emmetten	NW	1991	
491	Dürrenboden	Dallenwil	NW	1991	
203	Aelggäu	Alpnach	OW	2003	
254	Rischi	Sarnen	OW	1991	
256	Talhubel/Siterenmoos	Sarnen	OW	1991	2003
258	Marchmettlen	Sarnen	OW	1991	
260	Trogenwald	Sarnen	OW	1991	
261	Gross Trogen	Sarnen	OW	1991	2003
262	Chli Trogen	Giswil, Sarnen	OW	1991	
263	Seeliwald	Sarnen	OW	1991	
264	Münchenboden/Grund/ Ochsenalp	Giswil, Sarnen	OW	1991	2003
265	Ober Sewen	Sarnen	OW	1991	
266	Unter Sewen	Sarnen	OW	1991	
267	Schwand	Sarnen	OW	1991	
268	Schwendi Kaltbad	Sarnen	OW	1991	
269	Unteres Schlierental	Sarnen	OW	1991	
270	Hüenergütsch	Sarnen	OW	1991	
271	Riedboden bei Zischlig	Sarnen	OW	1991	
272	Fangboden	Sarnen	OW	1991	
273	Obere Schluecht/Untere Schluecht	Sarnen	OW	1991	
274	Teilenboden	Sarnen	OW	1991	
275	Wengli	Sarnen	OW	1991	
276	Häsiseggboden	Sarnen	OW	1991	
277	Meiengraben	Alpnach	OW	1991	
278	Zwischen Horweli und der Grossen Schliere	Alpnach	OW	1991	
279	Zwischen Horweli und Rossweid	Alpnach	OW	1991	
280	Rischigenmatt-Rotibach	Alpnach	OW	1991	
281	Längenfeldmoos	Alpnach	OW	1991	
282	Moor nördlich First	Alpnach	OW	1991	
283	Riedmattschwand	Giswil	OW	1991	
284	Dälenboden	Giswil	OW	1991	
285	Dörsmatt	Giswil	OW	1991	
286	Ried unter dem Rämsiboden	Giswil	OW	1991	
287	Totmoos	Giswil	OW	1991	
288	Merliwald	Giswil	OW	1991	
289	Gerzensee im Kernwald	Kerns	OW	1991	
290	Gerschni	Engelberg	OW	1991	
291	Feldmoos (Gerschni)	Engelberg	OW	1991	
292	Oberer Rorwald	Giswil	OW	1991	
293	Nollen	Giswil	OW	1991	
360	Unter dem Heidberistöckli	Giswil	OW	2003	
361	Nördlich Haldimattstock	Giswil	OW	2003	
461	Hüenergütsch	Sarnen	OW	2003	
462	Witi	Sarnen	OW	2003	
465	Bärmettlen	Sarnen	OW	2003	
466	Lengenschwand	Sarnen	OW	2003	
467	Nassboden	Sarnen	OW	2003	
474	Loomettlen	Giswil	OW	2003	
931	Obermattboden	Sarnen	OW	1991	
932	Gross Lucht	Sarnen	OW	1991	
933	Gerenstock	Sarnen	OW	1991	
935	Riedzöpf	Alpnach	OW	1991	
936	Rormettlen	Giswil	OW	1991	
937	Rorwald	Giswil	OW	1991	
134	Bergwis	Oberbüren	SG	1991	
136	Moore auf dem Rickenpass	Ernetschwil	SG	1991	
137	Unter Hüttenbüel	Ebnat-Kappel, Wattwil	SG	1991	
140	Gruen/Neuhüttli	Krummenau	SG	1991	
141	Bilchenriet/ Unterwald/Schiltmoos	Krummenau	SG	1991	
142	Lütisalp	Krummenau	SG	1991	
147	Chelen/Allmeindswald/ Bendelried	Ebnat-Kappel	SG	1991	
148	Salomonstempel	Ebnat-Kappel, Hemberg	SG	1991	
149	Moore auf der Wolzenalp (Hännis/Allmen/Rietbach)	Nesslau	SG	1991	
150	Gamperfin/Turbenriet/ Tischenriet/Gapels	Grabs	SG	1991	
151	Hirzenbäder/Sommerweid	Grabs	SG	1991	
152	Schönenboden/ Sommerigchopf	Gams	SG	1991	
153	Aelpli/Eggenriet	Grabs, Wildhaus	SG	1991	
154	Schwendiseen	Alt St. Johann, Wildhaus	SG	1991	
155	Gubelspitz	Rieden	SG	1991	
156	Feldmoos	Nesslau	SG	1991	
157	Dreihütten/Gamplüt	Wildhaus	SG	1991	
158	Eggweid auf dem Ricken	Ernetschwil	SG	1991	
159	Hinter Höhi/Bönisriet/ Stöcklerriet	Amden	SG	1991	
160	Altstofel	Amden	SG	1991	
161	Grossriet/Arvenbüel	Amden	SG	1991	
162	Munzenriet	Wildhaus	SG	1991	
169	Rotmoos	Degersheim	SG	1991	
244	Prodriet	Flums	SG	1991	
252	Madils	Flums, Quarten	SG	1991	2003
375	Westlich Längenegg	Amden	SG	2003	
423	Chapfensee	Mels	SG	1991	
424	Märzental	Mels	SG	1991	
425	Schwarzsee	Quarten	SG	1991	
426	Rietlichopf im Murgtal	Quarten	SG	1991	
428	Unter Murgsee	Quarten	SG	1991	
440	Nüchenstöck	Quarten	SG	1991	
442	Naserina	Quarten	SG	1991	
456	Tobelwald/Guetental	Quarten	SG	1991	
459	Obersäss	Vilters-Wangs	SG	1991	
536	Vorderwängi	Kaltbrunn	SG	1991	
538	Friessen	Nesslau	SG	1991	
539	Hinter Engi	Ebnat-Kappel	SG	1991	
578	Altschenchopf	Amden	SG	1991	
579	Schärsboden-Moor	Amden	SG	1991	
584	Moore im Trämelloch	Krummenau	SG	1991	
585	Hinterschluchen	Krummenau	SG	1991	
586	Chlosterwald-Moore/ Ampferenbödeli	Krummenau	SG	1991	
587	Moor zwischen Turn und Laub	Krummenau	SG	1991	
588	Moore bei Steig und Schartegg	Krummenau	SG	1991	
589	Au/Hinterlaad	Nesslau	SG	1991	
590	Goldach	Nesslau	SG	1991	
591	Moor nördlich Heeg	Gams	SG	1991	
593	Unterloch /Grundlosen	Krummenau	SG	1991	
594	Moore nördlich Guggeien	Hemberg	SG	1991	
595	Ober Bad	Hemberg	SG	1991	
135	Hudelmoos	Muolen, Amriswil, Sitterdorf, Zihlschlacht	SG, TG	1991	
76	Chlepfimoos/Burgmoos	Aeschi	SO	1991	
304	Schwantenau	Einsiedeln	SZ	1991	
305	Breitried	Einsiedeln, Unteriberg	SZ	1991	
306	Hessenmoos	Einsiedeln	SZ	1991	
307	Roblosen	Einsiedeln	SZ	1991	
308	Hobacher	Oberiberg	SZ	1991	
309	Furenwald	Oberiberg	SZ	1991	
310	Chli Underbäch	Oberiberg, Schwyz	SZ	1991	
311	Gross Underbäch	Oberiberg	SZ	1991	
323	Witi	Feusisberg	SZ	1991	
324	Schönboden	Einsiedeln, Freienbach	SZ	1991	
325	Tierfäderen	Unteriberg	SZ	1991	
326	Tubenmoos	Oberiberg	SZ	1991	
386	Fuederegg	Oberiberg	SZ	2003	
430	Hinter den Weiden	Rothenthurm	SZ	2003	
444	Westlich Etzel	Einsiedeln, Feusisberg	SZ	1991	
445	Platten	Unteriberg	SZ	1991	
446	Inner und Usser Schnabel	Schwyz	SZ	1991	
454	Teufböni	Morschach	SZ	1991	
303	Altmatt-Biberbrugg	Einsiedeln, Rothenthurm, Oberägeri	SZ, ZG	1991	
133	Barchetsee	Neunforn	TG	1991	
202	Pian Secco	Airolo	TI	1991	
204	Mottone di Garzonera	Quinto	TI	1991	
205	Piano della Bolla	Airolo	TI	1991	
206	Vél (Gribbio)	Chironico	TI	1991	
207	Piano sopra Visletto	Bignasco, Cevio	TI	1991	
208	Gola di Lago	Camignolo, Capriasca	TI	1991	
209	Pian Segna	Intragna, Mosogno	TI	1991	
210	Bolle di Pianazzora	Iragna, Personico	TI	1991	
211	Alpe di Sceng	Biasca	TI	1991	
212	Vall'Ambròsa	Olivone	TI	1991	
213	Campra di là	Olivone	TI	1991	
214	Pian Segno	Olivone	TI	1991	2003
215	Frodalera	Olivone	TI	1991	
458	Erbagni	Astano	TI	1991	
702	Pièi Bachei	Vergeletto	TI	2003	
94	Cadagno di fuori	Quinto	TI	1991	
95	Bedrina	Dalpe, Prato (Leventina)	TI	1991	
96	Bolle di Piana Selva	Dalpe, Faido	TI	1991	
249	Urner Boden	Spiringen	UR	1991	
250	Berg beim Göscheneralpsee	Göschenen	UR	1991	
251	Rüti am Arnisee	Gurtnellen	UR	1991	
438	Fulensee	Erstfeld	UR	1991	
700	Unter Wängi	Bürglen	UR	2003	
550	Tourbière à l'est de la Lécherette	Château-d'Oex	VD	1991	
551	Communs des Mosses, est	Ormont-Dessous	VD	1991	
552	Communs des Mosses, ouest	Ormont-Dessous	VD	1991	
553	Tourbière de Pra Cornet	Château-d'Oex	VD	1991	
554	Col des Mosses	Ormont-Dessous	VD	1991	2003
569	Tourbière sous les Plans	Château-d'Oex	VD	1991	
600	Bois des Cent Toises	Arzier	VD	1991	
701	Sèche de Gimel	Le Chenit	VD	2003	
22	Mouille de la Vraconne	Sainte-Croix	VD	1991	
23	Mouille au Sayet	Sainte-Croix	VD	1991	
24	Les Mouilles	Sainte-Croix	VD	1991	
25	Les Araignys	Sainte-Croix	VD	1991	
26	Mouille de la Sagne	Sainte-Croix	VD	1991	
27	La Sagne du Séchey	Le Lieu	VD	1991	
28	La Sagne au sud-ouest du Lieu	Le Lieu	VD	1991	
29	Pontet	Le Chenit	VD	1991	
30	Derrière la Côte, sud-est	Le Chenit	VD	1991	
31	Derrière la Côte, sud-ouest	Le Chenit	VD	1991	
32	La Thomassette	Le Chenit	VD	1991	
33	Les Sagnes du Sentier	Le Chenit	VD	1991	
34	La Sagne du Campe	Le Chenit	VD	1991	
35	La Bursine	Le Chenit	VD	1991	
36	Sagne de Pré Rodet	Le Chenit	VD	1991	
37	Sagnes de la Burtignière	Le Chenit	VD	1991	
38	Bois du Carre	Le Chenit	VD	1991	2003
39	Petits Plats	Arzier	VD	1991	
40	Bois du Marchairuz	Le Chenit	VD	1991	
51	La Trélasse	Gingins, Saint-Cergue	VD	1991	
52	Rière la Givrine	Saint-Cergue	VD	1991	
53	Marais Rouge	Arzier	VD	1991	
54	Creux du Croue	Arzier	VD	1991	
85	Les Tenasses	Blonay, Saint-Légier-La Chiésaz	VD	1991	
357	Barme	Champéry	VS	2003	
419	Simplonpass/Hopschusee	Simplon	VS	1991	
420	Flesch	Goppisberg	VS	1991	
431	Boniger See	Törbel	VS	1991	
439	Bärfel	Oberwald	VS	1991	
941	Aletschwald	Ried bei Mörel	VS	1991	
86	Gouille Verte	Martigny-Combe	VS	1991	
87	Lac de Champex	Orsières	VS	1991	
88	La Maraiche de Plex	Collonges	VS	1991	
170	Eigenried/Birchried/Kellersforen/Früebüelmoos	Walchwil, Zug	ZG	1991	
171	Vorderer Geissboden	Zug	ZG	1991	
172	Zigermoos	Unterägeri	ZG	1991	
173	Chnoden/Heumoos	Walchwil	ZG	1991	
174	Im Fang	Unterägeri	ZG	1991	
175	Moor zwischen Büel und Blattwald	Neuheim	ZG	1991	
176	Egelsee	Menzingen	ZG	1991	
177	Chälenmoor	Menzingen	ZG	1991	
178	Blimoos	Unterägeri	ZG	1991	
179	Chäsgaden	Unterägeri	ZG	1991	
189	Brämenegg/Furen	Oberägeri	ZG	1991	
190	Moore beim Chlausechappeli	Menzingen, Oberägeri	ZG	1991	
191	Breitried	Oberägeri	ZG	1991	
369	Wissenbach	Oberägeri	ZG	2003	
530	Tännlimoos/Hintercher-Moos/Muserholz	Menzingen	ZG	1991	
531	Moor nördlich Schwandegg/Twärfallen	Menzingen	ZG	1991	
532	Neugrundmoor/Würzgarten	Menzingen	ZG	1991	
533	Moor im Hürital	Unterägeri	ZG	1991	
540	Tubenloch/Hünggi	Unterägeri	ZG	1991	
573	Schindellegi	Zug	ZG	1991	
100	Wildert	Illnau-Effretikon	ZH	1991	
101	Weid	Fehraltorf	ZH	1991	
102	Torfriet	Pfäffikon	ZH	1991	
103	Robenhauseriet/Pfäffikersee	Pfäffikon, Seegräben, Wetzikon	ZH	1991	
104	Ambitzgi/Böhnlerriet	Wetzikon	ZH	1991	
105	Oberhöfler Riet	Gossau, Hinwil, Wetzikon	ZH	1991	
106	Hiwiler Riet	Hinwil, Wetzikon	ZH	1991	2003
109	Seeweidsee	Hombrechtikon	ZH	1991	
110	Egelsee	Bubikon	ZH	1991	
111	Schönbühl	Bubikon	ZH	1991	
112	Rütiwald	Rüti	ZH	1991	
114	Moor Rinderweiderhau/Hinter Bisliken	Affoltern am Albis	ZH	1991	
115	Unterrifferswilermoos/Chrutzlen/Oberrifferswilermoos	Hausen am Albis, Rifferswil	ZH	1991	
116	Rorholz	Rifferswil	ZH	1991	
117	Hagenholz/Hagenmoos	Kappel am Albis, Rifferswil	ZH	1991	
119	Aegelsee	Knonau, Maschwanden	ZH	1991	
120	Vermoorungen um das Sagenhölzli	Schönenberg	ZH	1991	
121	Hinterbergried	Schönenberg	ZH	1991	
122	Gubelmoos	Schönenberg	ZH	1991	
123	Spitzenmoos	Hirzel, Wädenswil	ZH	1991	
124	Chrutzelenmoos	Hirzel	ZH	1991	
125	Grindelmoos	Horgen	ZH	1991	
132	Moos Schönenhof bei Wallisellen	Wallisellen	ZH	1991	
80	Räubrichseen	Kleinandelfingen	ZH	1991	
81	Gurisee	Dägerlen, Dinhard	ZH	1991	
97	Mettmenhasler See	Niederhasli	ZH	1991	
98	Chräenriet	Regensdorf	ZH	1991	
99	Chatzensee	Zürich	ZH	1991	
118	Häglimoos	Kappel am Albis, Knonau, Steinhausen	ZH, ZG	1991	

== See also ==
- Nature parks in Switzerland
