= Cerniat =

- Former municipality
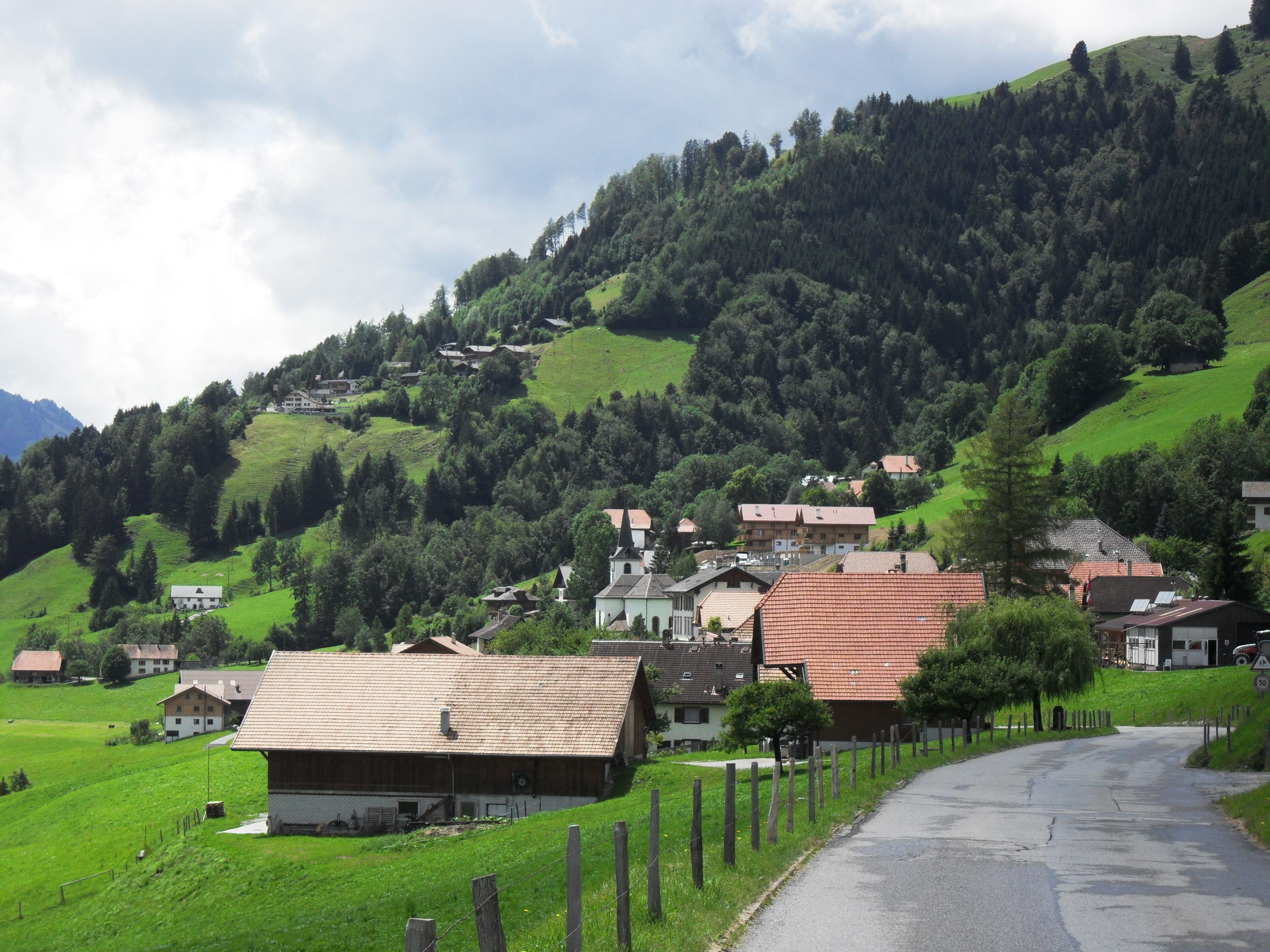
- Cerniat village

- Coat of arms
- Location of Cerniat
- Location within Switzerland Location within Canton of Fribourg
- Coordinates: 46°38′N 7°9′E
- Country: Switzerland
- Canton: Fribourg
- District: Gruyère

Area
  - Total: 33.7 km^{2} (13.0 sq mi)
- Elevation: 927 m (3,041 ft)

Population (Dec 2011)
  - Total: 346
  - Density: 10.3/km^{2} (26.6/sq mi)
- Time zone: UTC+01:00 (CET)
  - Summer (DST): UTC+02:00 (CEST)
- Postal code: 1654
- SFOS number: 2126
- ISO 3166 code: CH-FR
- Surrounded by: Charmey (Gruyère), Châtel-sur-Montsalvens, Corbières, Crésuz, Hauteville, La Roche, Plaffeien, Plasselb, Villarbeney, Villarvolard
- Website: http://www.val-de-charmey.ch

Cerniat (French: [sɛʁnja]; Arpitan: Cèrniê [ˈθɛrɲa]) is a former municipality in the district of Gruyère in the canton of Fribourg in Switzerland. On 1 January 2014 the former municipalities of Cerniat and Charmey merged into the new municipality of Val-de-Charmey.

== History ==
Cerniat is first mentioned in 1288 as Sernia.

== Geography ==
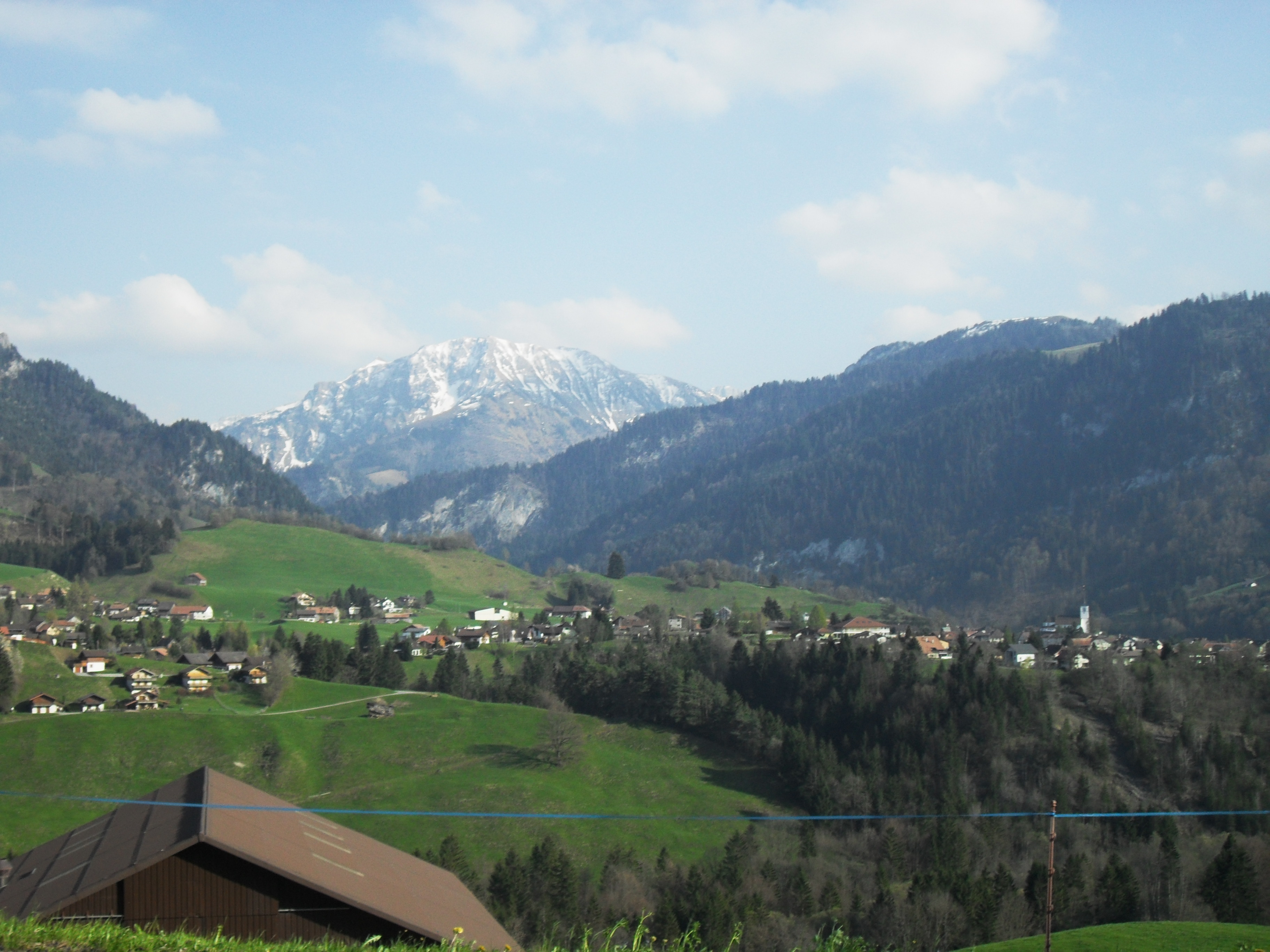
Cerniat and surroundings

Aerial view (1964)

Before the merger, Cerniat had a total area of 33.7 km^{2} (13.0 mi^{2}). Of this area, 13.78 km^{2} (5.32 mi^{2}) or 40.9% is used for agricultural purposes, while 18.47 km^{2} (7.13 mi^{2}) or 54.8% is forested. Of the rest of the land, 0.79 km^{2} (0.31 mi^{2}) or 2.3% is settled (buildings or roads), 0.26 km^{2} (0.10 mi^{2}) or 0.8% is either rivers or lakes and 0.43 km^{2} (0.17 mi^{2}) or 1.3% is unproductive land.

Of the built up area, housing and buildings made up 0.8% and transportation infrastructure made up 1.4%. Out of the forested land, 51.9% of the total land area is heavily forested and 2.8% is covered with orchards or small clusters of trees. Of the agricultural land 7.0% is pastures and 33.9% is used for alpine pastures. All the water in the municipality is flowing water.

== Coat of arms ==
The blazon of the municipal coat of arms is Gules a Bend Argent between an Orb in chief and a Cattle in base Or.

== Demographics ==
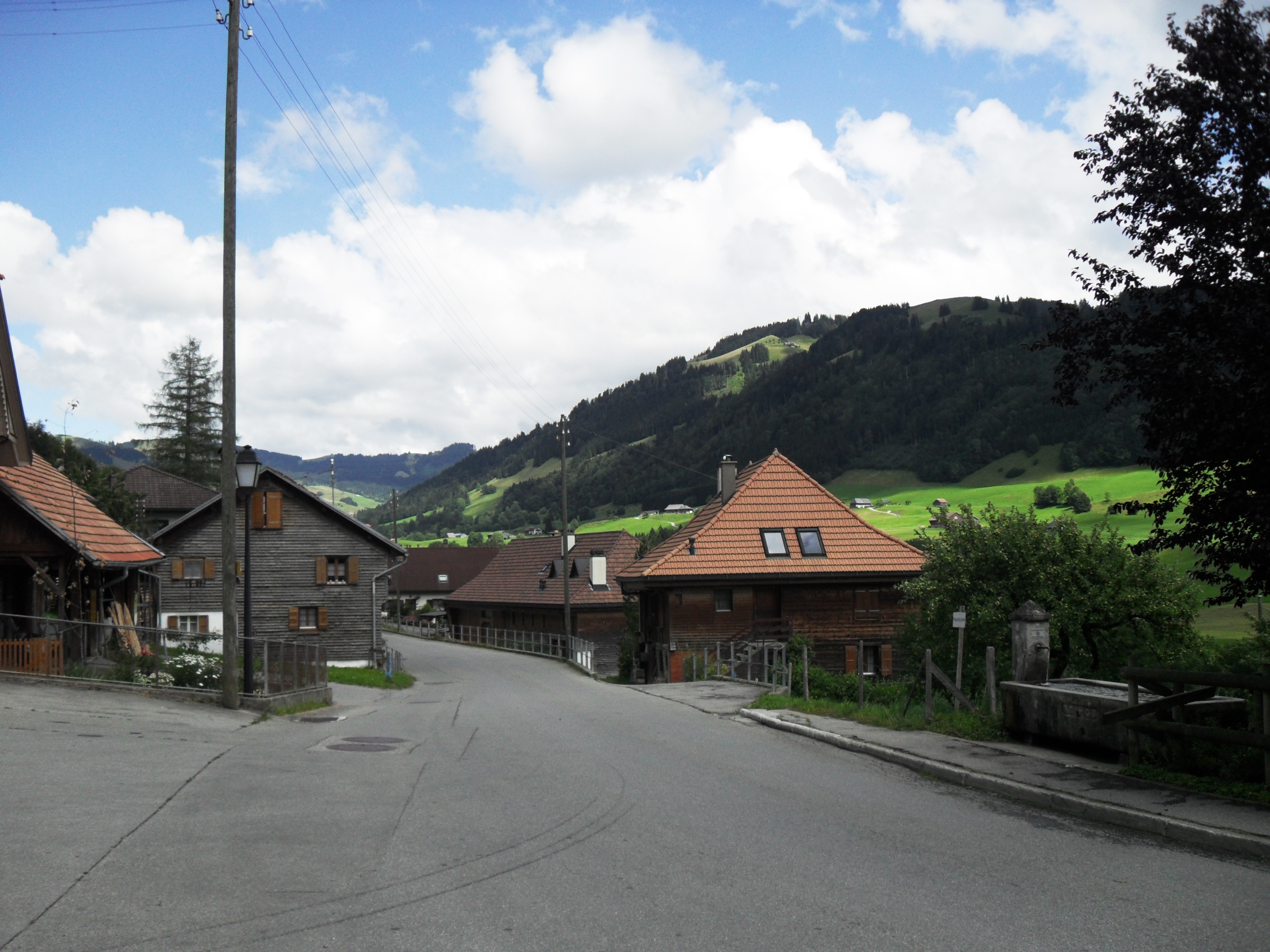
Cerniat village

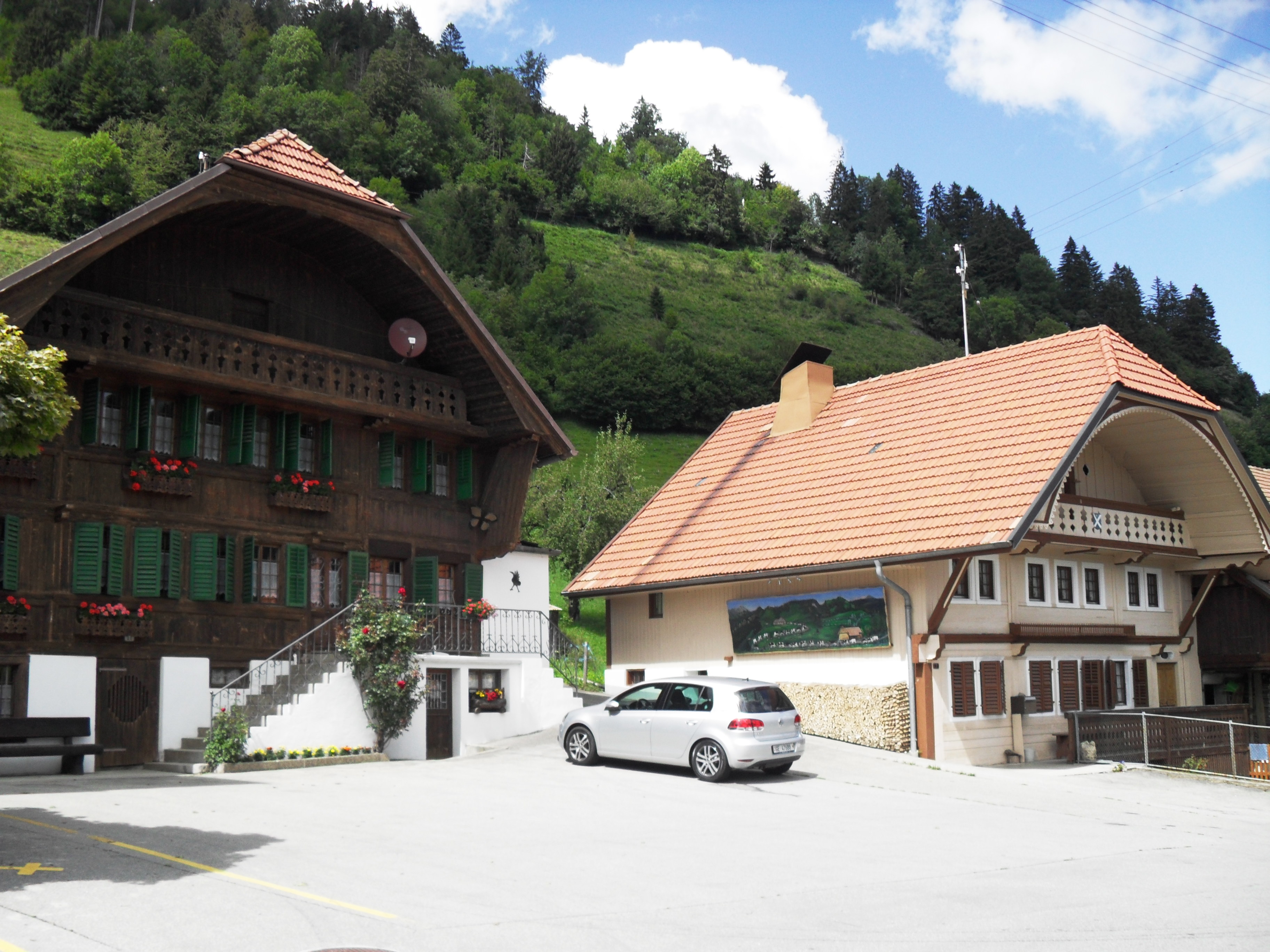
Houses in Cerniat

Cerniat had a population (as of 2011) of 346. As of 2008, 5.5% of the population are resident foreign nationals. Over the last 10 years (2000–2010) the population has changed at a rate of -0.9%. Migration accounted for -3%, while births and deaths accounted for -2.7%.

Most of the population (as of 2000) speaks French (294 or 88.6%) as their first language, German is the second most common (32 or 9.6%) and Italian is the third (1 or 0.3%).

As of 2008, the population was 53.1% male and 46.9% female. The population was made up of 154 Swiss men (49.8% of the population) and 10 (3.2%) non-Swiss men. There were 133 Swiss women (43.0%) and 12 (3.9%) non-Swiss women. Of the population in the municipality, 157 or about 47.3% were born in Cerniat and lived there in 2000. There were 96 or 28.9% who were born in the same canton, while 54 or 16.3% were born somewhere else in Switzerland, and 24 or 7.2% were born outside of Switzerland.

As of 2000, children and teenagers (0–19 years old) make up 21.7% of the population, while adults (20–64 years old) make up 62% and seniors (over 64 years old) make up 16.3%.

As of 2000, there were 153 people who were single and never married in the municipality. There were 139 married individuals, 20 widows or widowers and 20 individuals who are divorced.

As of 2000, there were 128 private households in the municipality, and an average of 2.4 persons per household. There were 40 households that consist of only one person and 11 households with five or more people. In 2000, a total of 126 apartments (64.6% of the total) were permanently occupied, while 52 apartments (26.7%) were seasonally occupied and 17 apartments (8.7%) were empty. As of 2009, the construction rate of new housing units was 6.1 new units per 1000 residents.

The historical population is given in the following chart:

== Heritage sites of national significance ==
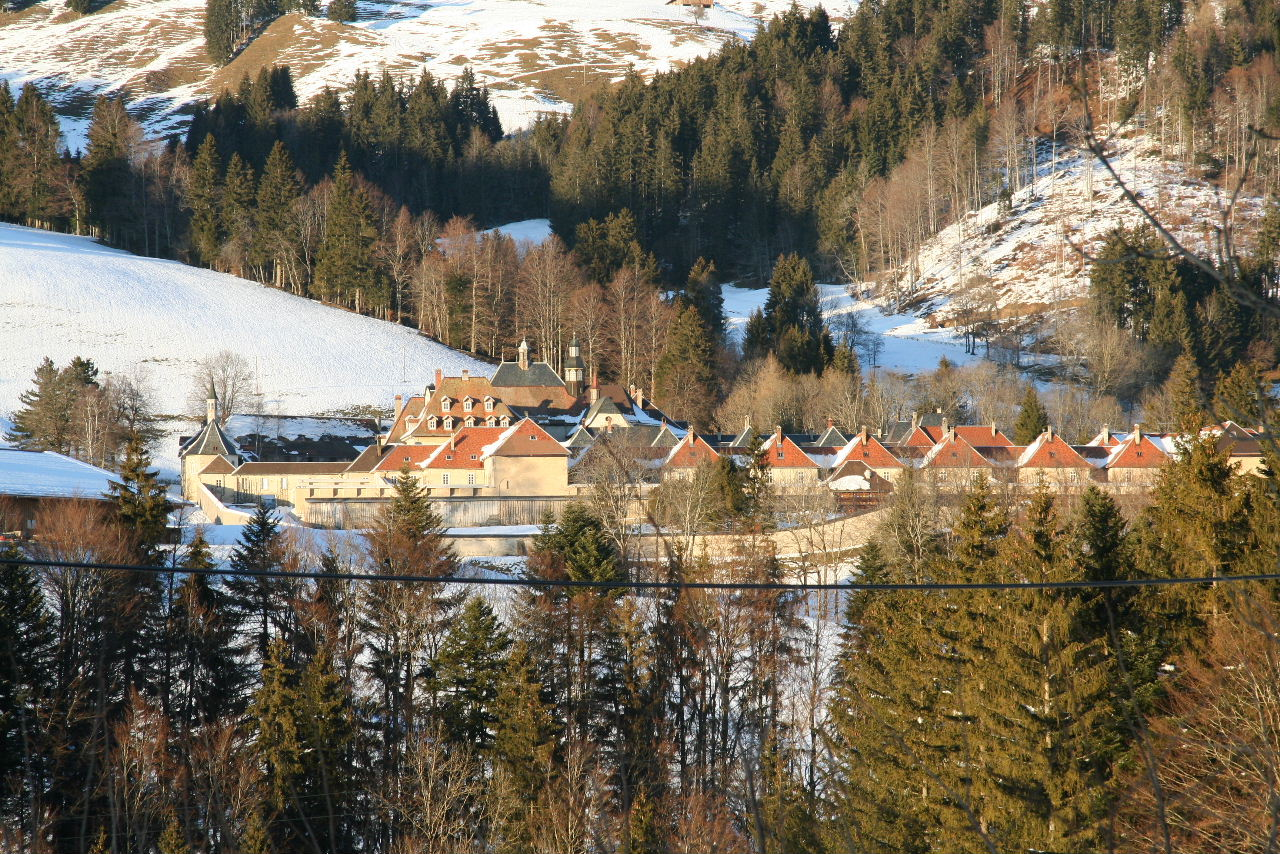
Chartreuse De La Valsainte

The Chartreuse De La Valsainte is listed as Swiss heritage site of national significance. The entire La Valsainte area is part of the Inventory of Swiss Heritage Sites.

== Politics ==
In the 2011 federal election the most popular party was the CVP which received 37.2% of the vote. The next three most popular parties were the SVP (25.7%), the FDP (15.4%) and the SP (12.5%).

The CVP lost about 17.6% of the vote when compared to the 2007 Federal election (54.9% in 2007 vs 37.2% in 2011). The SVP gained popularity (19.3% in 2007), the FDP retained about the same popularity (11.2% in 2007) and the SPS gained popularity (5.8% in 2007). A total of 166 votes were cast in this election, of which 2 or 1.2% were invalid.

== Economy ==
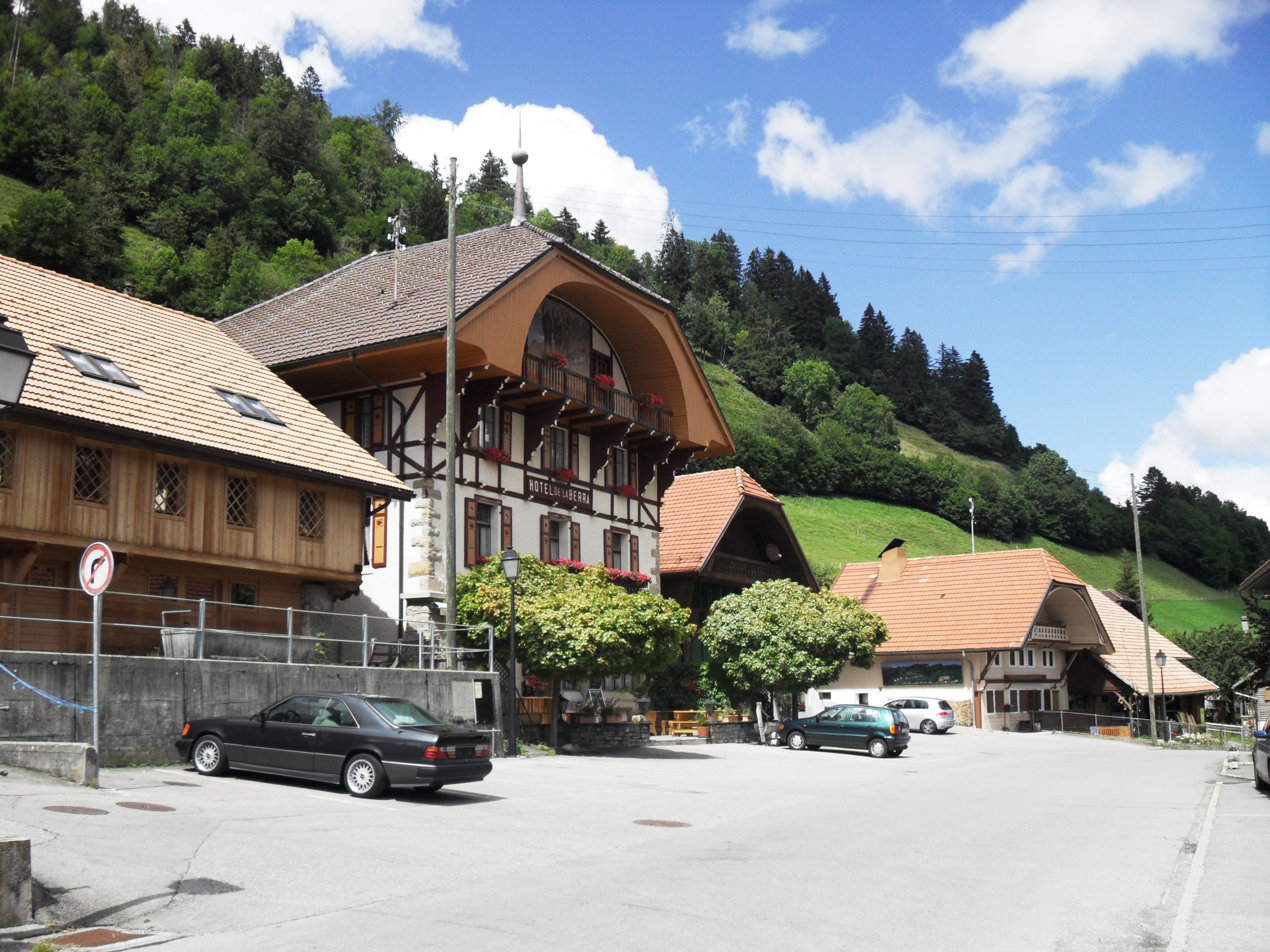
Café Restaurant "La Berra" in Cerniat

As of 2010, Cerniat had an unemployment rate of 0.9%. As of 2008, there were 35 people employed in the primary economic sector and about 13 businesses involved in this sector. 8 people were employed in the secondary sector and there were 4 businesses in this sector. 12 people were employed in the tertiary sector, with 6 businesses in this sector. There were 168 residents of the municipality who were employed in some capacity, of which females made up 33.9% of the workforce.

In 2008 the total number of full-time equivalent jobs was 42. The number of jobs in the primary sector was 24, of which 23 were in agriculture and 1 was in forestry or lumber production. The number of jobs in the secondary sector was 8, all of which were in construction. The number of jobs in the tertiary sector was 10. In the tertiary sector; 3 were in wholesale or retail sales or the repair of motor vehicles, 2 were in a hotel or restaurant and 3 were in education.

In 2000, there were 13 workers who commuted into the municipality and 113 workers who commuted away. The municipality is a net exporter of workers, with about 8.7 workers leaving the municipality for every one entering. Of the working population, 8.9% used public transportation to get to work, and 61.3% used a private car.

== Religion ==
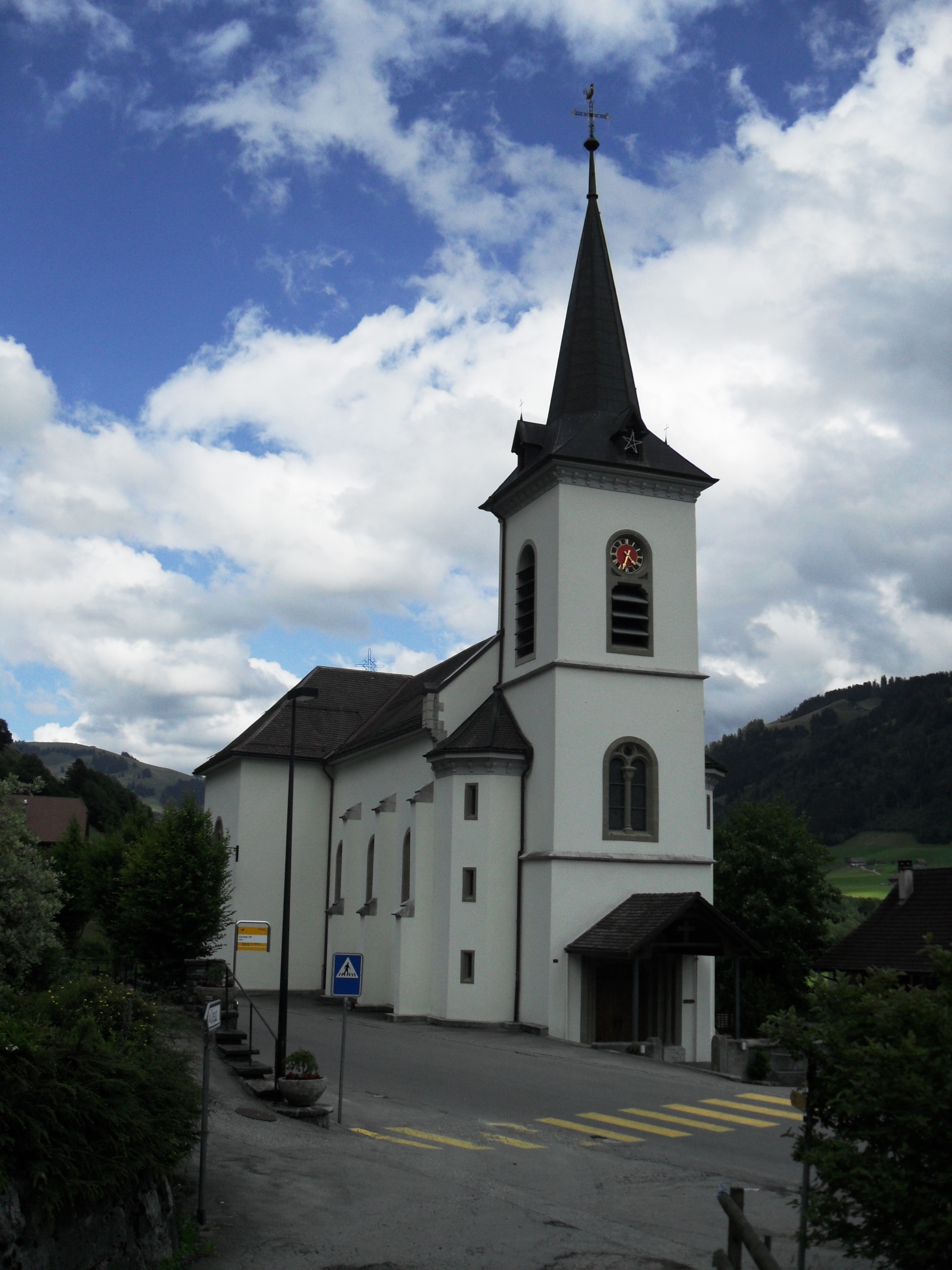
Church of Jean et Paul in Cerniat

From the 2000 census, 304 or 91.6% were Roman Catholic, while 12 or 3.6% belonged to the Swiss Reformed Church. Of the rest of the population, there were 2 individuals (or about 0.60% of the population) who belonged to another Christian church. There was 1 individual who was Islamic. There was 1 person who was Buddhist. 9 (or about 2.71% of the population) belonged to no church, are agnostic or atheist, and 3 individuals (or about 0.90% of the population) did not answer the question.

== Education ==
In Cerniat about 106 or (31.9%) of the population have completed non-mandatory upper secondary education, and 28 or (8.4%) have completed additional higher education (either university or a Fachhochschule). Of the 28 who completed tertiary schooling, 57.1% were Swiss men, 32.1% were Swiss women.

The Canton of Fribourg school system provides one year of non-obligatory Kindergarten, followed by six years of Primary school. This is followed by three years of obligatory lower Secondary school where the students are separated according to ability and aptitude. Following the lower Secondary students may attend a three or four year optional upper Secondary school. The upper Secondary school is divided into gymnasium (university preparatory) and vocational programs. After they finish the upper Secondary program, students may choose to attend a Tertiary school or continue their apprenticeship.

During the 2010-11 school year, there were a total of 28 students attending 2 classes in Cerniat. A total of 44 students from the municipality attended any school, either in the municipality or outside of it. There were no kindergarten classes in the municipality, but 4 students attended kindergarten in a neighboring municipality. The municipality had 2 primary classes and 28 students. During the same year, there were no lower secondary classes in the municipality, but 6 students attended lower secondary school in a neighboring municipality. There were no upper Secondary classes or vocational classes, but there were 2 upper Secondary students and 7 upper Secondary vocational students who attended classes in another municipality. The municipality had no non-university Tertiary classes. who attended classes in another municipality.

As of 2000, there were 14 students in Cerniat who came from another municipality, while 35 residents attended schools outside the municipality.
