= Bonigersee =

Lake in Valais, Switzerland

- Location within Canton of Valais Location within Switzerland Location within Alps
- Interactive map of Bonigersee
- Location: Valais
- Coordinates: 46°15′22″N 7°50′39″E
- Basin countries: Switzerland
- Surface area: 0.9 ha (2.2 acres)
- Surface elevation: 2,090 m (6,860 ft)

Bonigersee is a lake at Törbel in the canton of Valais, Switzerland. Its surface area is 0.9 ha. The raised bog is listed in the Federal Inventory of Raised and Transitional Bogs of National Importance and the Federal Inventory of Amphibian Spawning Areas.
