= Val-de-Charmey =

- Municipality
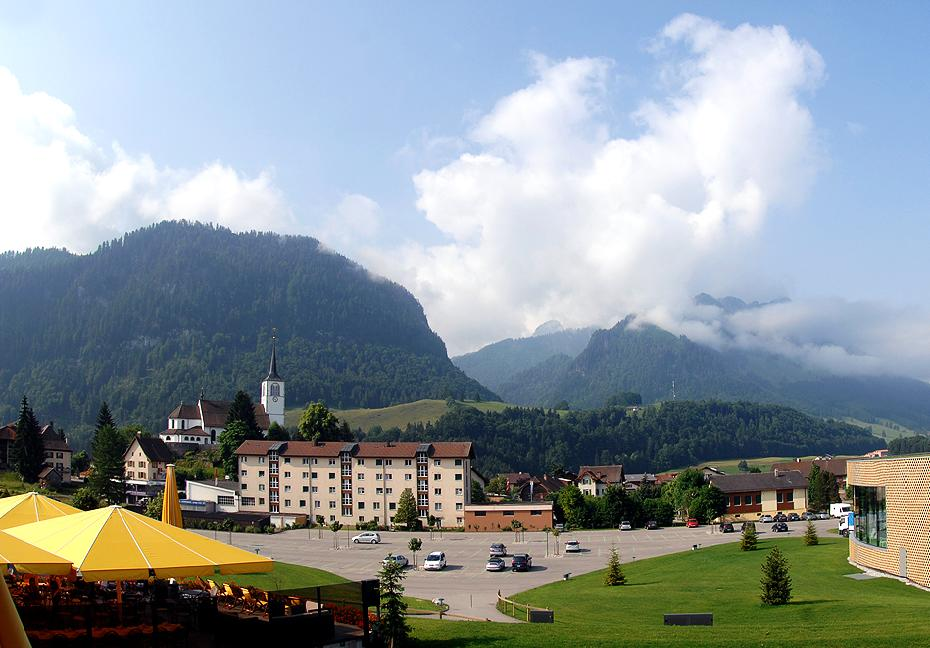
- Charmey village

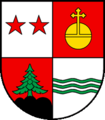
- Coat of arms
- Location of Val-de-Charmey
- Location within Switzerland Location within Canton of Fribourg
- Coordinates: 46°37′N 7°10′E
- Country: Switzerland
- Canton: Fribourg
- District: Gruyère

Government
  - Mayor: Syndic

Area
  - Total: 112.15 km^{2} (43.30 sq mi)

Population (Dec 2011)
  - Total: 2,295
  - Density: 20.46/km^{2} (53.00/sq mi)
- Time zone: UTC+01:00 (CET)
  - Summer (DST): UTC+02:00 (CEST)
- Postal code: 1637, 1654
- SFOS number: 2163
- ISO 3166 code: CH-FR
- Surrounded by: Bas-Intyamon, Botterens, Broc, Châtel-sur-Montsalvens, Corbières, Château-d’Oex (VD), Crésuz, Grandvillard, Gruyères, Hauteville, Jaun, La Roche, Plaffeien, Plasselb, Rougemont (VD), Saanen (BE)
- Twin towns: Orphin (France)
- Website: val-de-charmey.ch

Val-de-Charmey (French pronunciation: [val də ʃaʁmɛ]) is a municipality in the district of Gruyère in the canton of Fribourg in Switzerland. On 1 January 2014 the former municipalities of Cerniat and Charmey merged into the municipality of Val-de-Charmey.

== History ==
Cerniat is first mentioned in 1288 as Sernia. Charmey is first mentioned in 1211 as Chalmeis. Until 1760 it was known as Feiguières. The municipality is also informally known by its German name Galmis.

== Geography ==
After the 2014 merger Val-de-Charmey had an area of 112.07 km^{2} (43.27 sq mi). Of this area, about 43.7% is used for agricultural purposes, while 41.9% is forested. Of the rest of the land, 2.1% is settled (buildings or roads) and 12.2% is unproductive land. In the 2013/18 survey a total of 133 ha (330 acres) or about 1.2% of the total area was covered with buildings, an increase of 53 ha (130 acres) over the 1980/81 amount. Over the same time period, the amount of recreational space in the municipality increased by 2 ha (4.9 acres) and is now about 0.04% of the total area. Of the agricultural land, 3 ha (7.4 acres) is used for orchards and vineyards, 648 ha (1,600 acres) is fields and grasslands and 4,644 ha (11,480 acres) consists of alpine grazing areas. Since 1980/81 the amount of agricultural land has decreased by 286 ha (710 acres). Over the same time period the amount of forested land has increased by 308 ha (760 acres).

Rivers and lakes cover 110 ha (270 acres) in the municipality.

== Demographics ==
Val-de-Charmey has a population (as of December 2020) of 2,548. As of 2016, 16.8% of the population are resident foreign nationals. In 2015 a small minority (136 or 5.6% of the population) was born in France. Over the last 6 years (2010-2016) the population has changed at a rate of 11.65%. The birth rate in the municipality, in 2016, was 7.4, while the death rate was 16.9 per thousand residents.

As of 2016, children and teenagers (0–19 years old) make up 18.8% of the population, while adults (20–64 years old) are 57.5% of the population and seniors (over 64 years old) make up 23.7%. In 2015 there were 948 single residents, 1,102 people who were married or in a civil partnership, 160 widows or widowers and 206 divorced residents.

In 2016 there were 1,087 private households in Val-de-Charmey with an average household size of 2.19 persons. In 2015 about 61.6% of all buildings in the municipality were single family homes, which is about the same as the percentage in the canton (61.6%) and about the same as the percentage nationally (57.4%). In 2015 the rate of construction of new housing units per 1000 residents was 3.31. The vacancy rate for the municipality, in 2017, was 0.36%.

== Historic population ==
The historical population is given in the following chart:

== Heritage sites of national significance ==
The Chartreuse De La Valsainte, the alpine chalet at Le Lapé 320 and the alpine chalet at Pra de La Monse 249 are listed as Swiss heritage site of national significance.

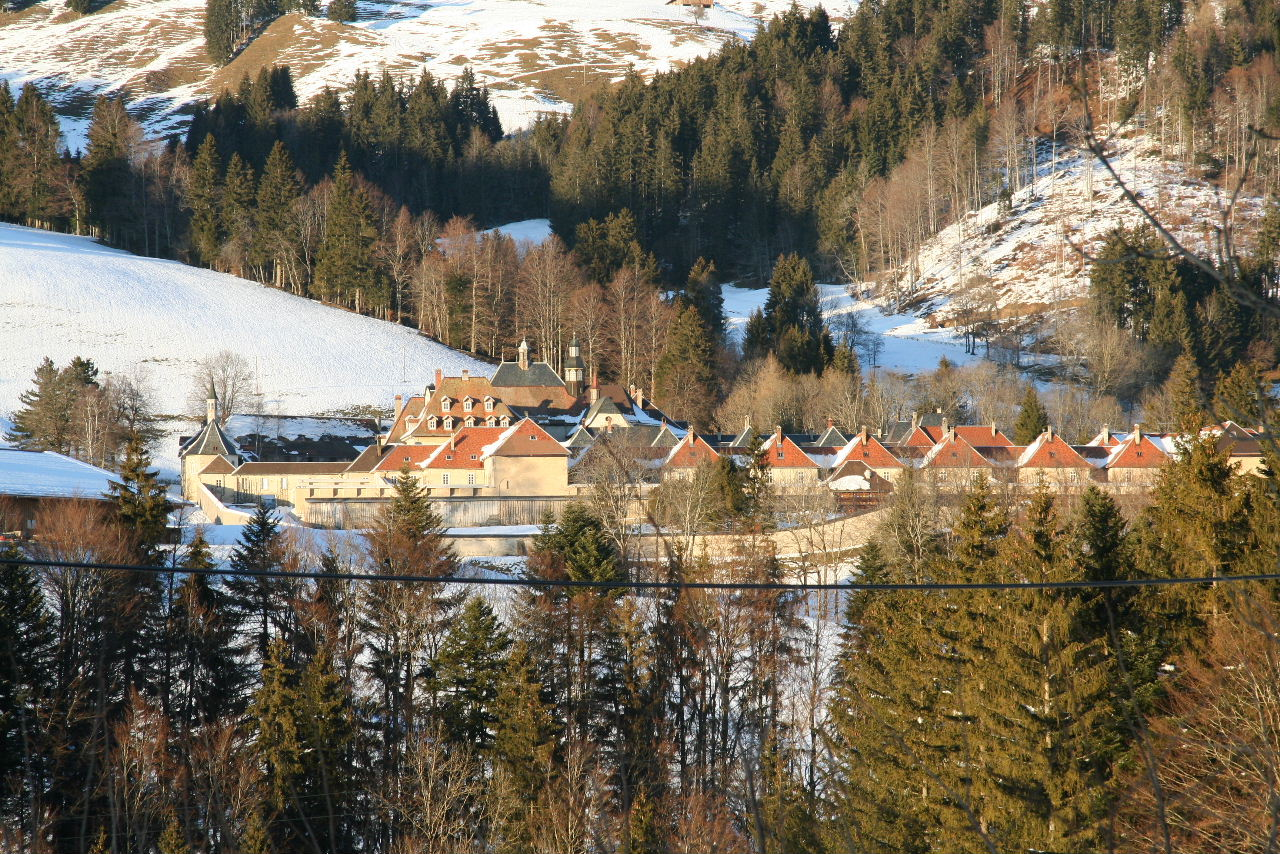
Chartreuse De La Valsainte

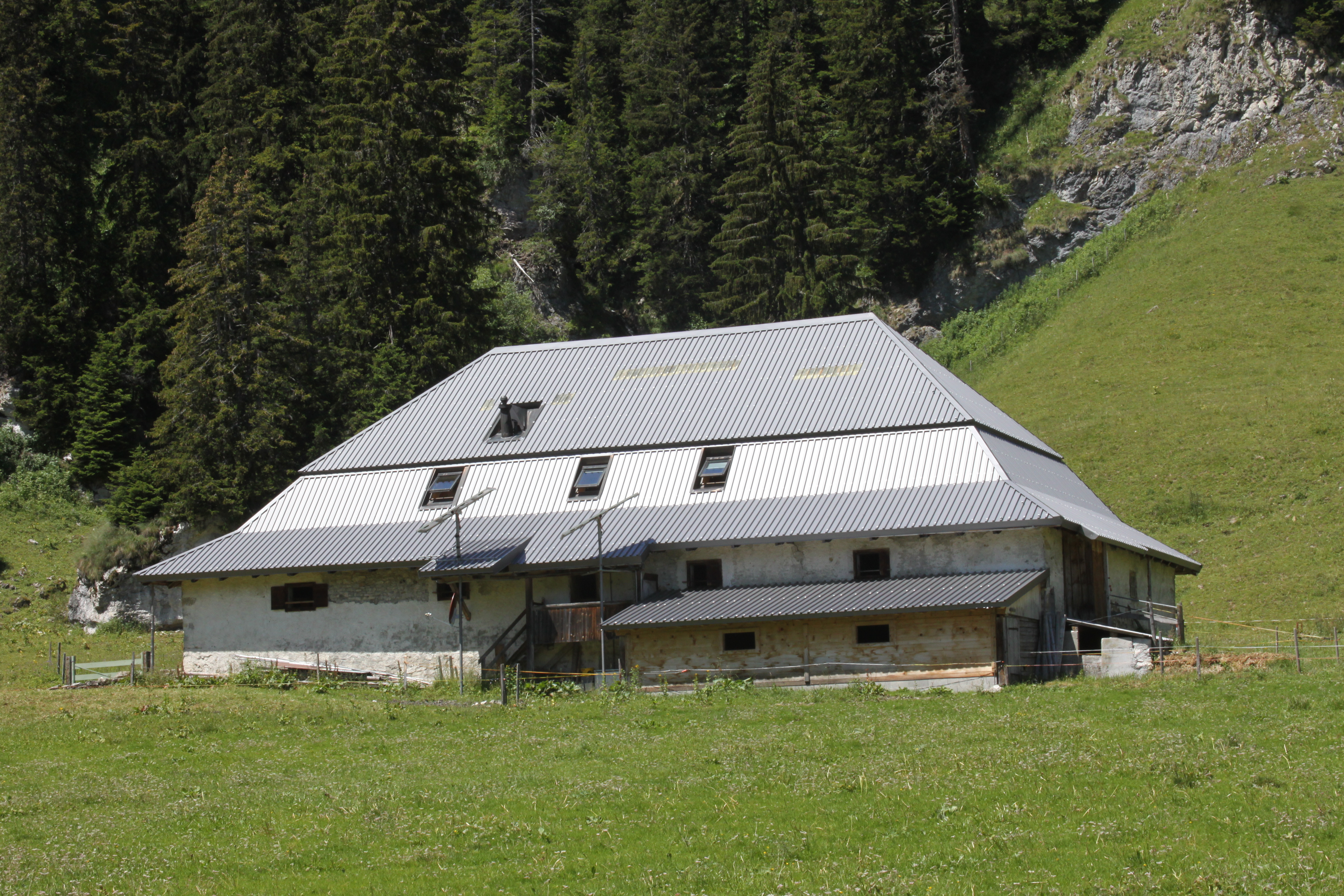
Alpine Chalet at Le Lapé 320

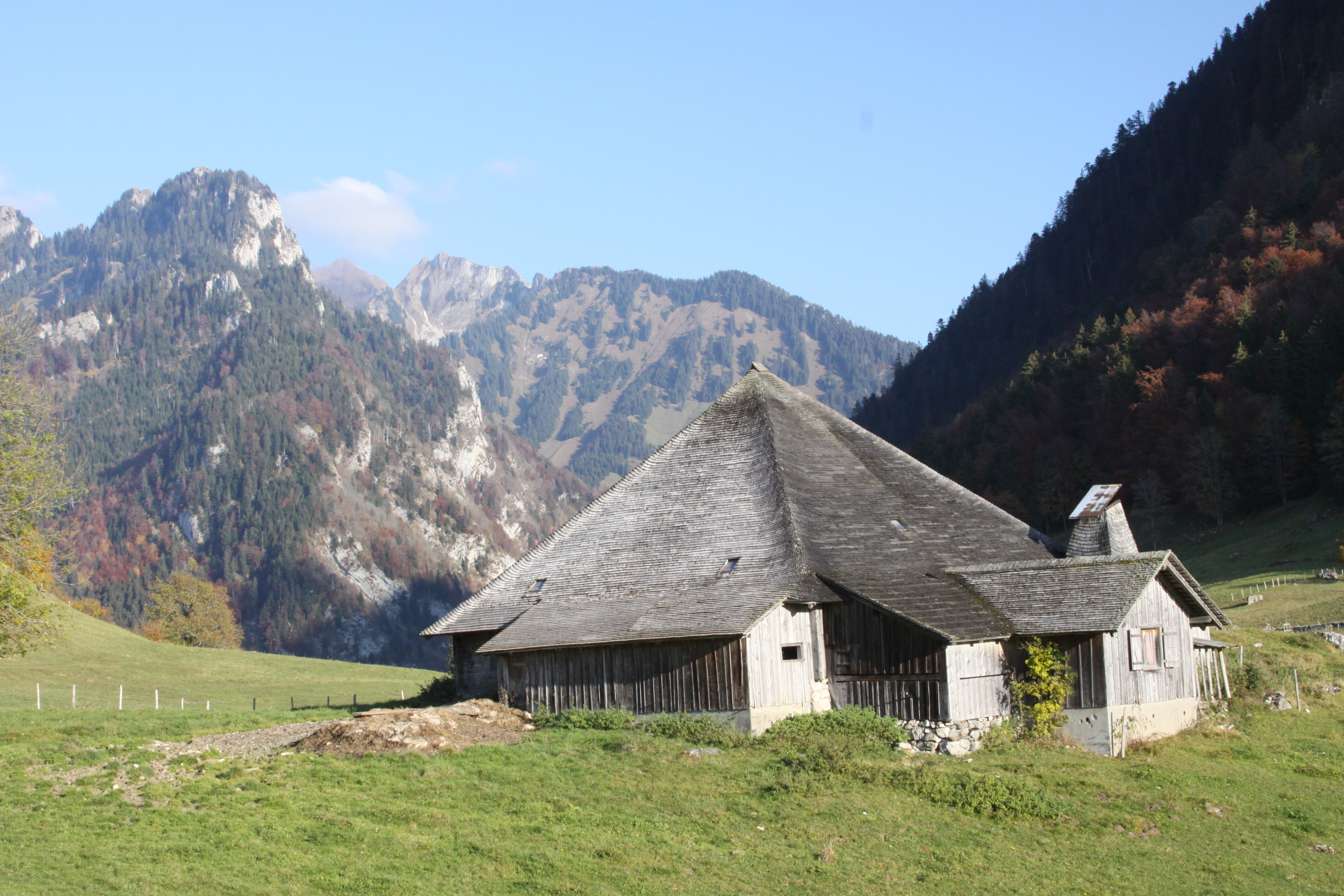
Alpine Chalet at Pra de La Monse 249

== Economy ==
Val-de-Charmey is classed as a mixed agro-industrial community, a municipality where agriculture and manufacturing play a significant role in the economy.

As of 2016, there were a total of 1,095 people employed in the municipality. Of these, a total of 135 people worked in 39 businesses in the primary economic sector. The secondary sector employed 328 workers in 48 separate businesses. Finally, the tertiary sector provided 632 jobs in 128 businesses, of which 205 people worked in large business(es) (50-249 employees). In 2016 a total of 3.3% of the population received social assistance.

In 2015 the average cantonal, municipal and church tax rate in the municipality for a couple with two children making SFr 80,000 was 4.8% while the rate for a single person making SFr 150,000 was 19.5%, both of which are close to the average for the canton. The canton has an average tax rate for those making SFr 80,000 and a slightly higher than average rate for those making SFr 150,000.

== Politics ==
In the 2015 federal election the most popular party was the CVP with 31.1% of the vote. The next three most popular parties were the SVP (25.1%), the FDP (21.4%) and the SP (15.4%). In the federal election, a total of 865 votes were cast, and the voter turnout was 52.3%.

== Crime ==
In 2014 the crime rate, of the over 200 crimes listed in the Swiss Criminal Code (running from murder, robbery and assault to accepting bribes and election fraud), in Val-de-Charmey was 46.7 per thousand residents. This rate is about 72.3% of the average rate in the entire country. During the same period, the rate of drug crimes was 3.8 per thousand residents which is only 39.6% of the rate in the canton and 38.4% of the national rate. The rate of violations of immigration, visa and work permit laws was 5.1 per thousand residents.
