= Crésuz =

- Municipality
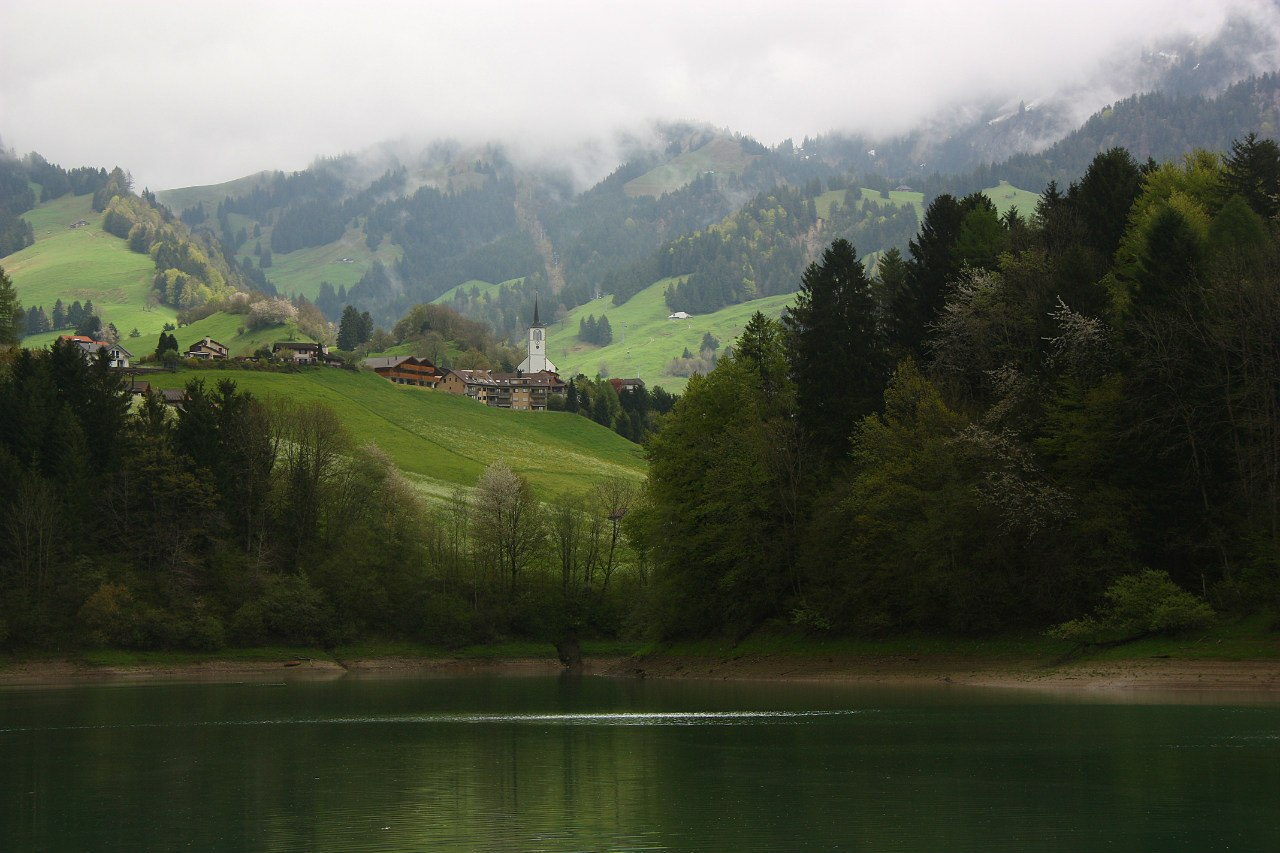

- Flag Coat of arms
- Location of Crésuz
- Location within Switzerland Location within Canton of Fribourg
- Coordinates: 46°37′N 7°8′E
- Country: Switzerland
- Canton: Fribourg
- District: Gruyère

Government
  - Mayor: Syndic

Area
  - Total: 1.80 km^{2} (0.69 sq mi)
- Elevation: 909 m (2,982 ft)

Population (December 2020)
  - Total: 415
  - Density: 231/km^{2} (597/sq mi)
- Time zone: UTC+01:00 (CET)
  - Summer (DST): UTC+02:00 (CEST)
- Postal code: 1653
- SFOS number: 2130
- ISO 3166 code: CH-FR
- Surrounded by: Broc, Châtel-sur-Montsalvens, Val-de-Charmey
- Website: www.cresuz.ch

Crésuz (/kreɪˈʒjuː/; French: [kʁezy]; Arpitan: Crèsuz or Kreju, locally [ˈkʀəʒy]) is a municipality in the district of Gruyère in the canton of Fribourg in Switzerland.

== History ==
Aerial view (1964)

Crésuz is first mentioned in 1301 as Cresu.

== Geography ==
Crésuz has an area, as of 2009, of 1.8 square kilometers (0.69 mi^{2}). Of this area, 0.61 km^{2} (0.24 mi^{2}) or 34.3% is used for agricultural purposes, while 0.63 km^{2} (0.24 mi^{2}) or 35.4% is forested. Of the rest of the land, 0.42 km^{2} (0.16 mi^{2}) or 23.6% is settled (buildings or roads), 0.13 km^{2} (32 acres) or 7.3% is either rivers or lakes and 0.01 km^{2} (2.5 acres) or 0.6% is unproductive land.

Of the built up area, housing and buildings made up 16.9% and transportation infrastructure made up 6.2%. Out of the forested land, 34.3% of the total land area is heavily forested and 1.1% is covered with orchards or small clusters of trees. Of the agricultural land, 14.0% is pastures and 20.2% is used for alpine pastures. Of the water in the municipality, 6.7% is in lakes and 0.6% is in rivers and streams.

The municipality is located in the Gruyère district, above the Lac de Montsalvens. It consists of the village of Crésuz on the Bulle-Boltigen road.

== Coat of arms ==
The blazon of the municipal coat of arms is Gules, on a Fess Argent a Crow Sable passant and in base Coupeaux Vert.

== Demographics ==
Crésuz has a population (as of December 2020) of 415. As of 2008, 17.5% of the population are resident foreign nationals. Over the last 10 years (2000–2010) the population has changed at a rate of 11.1%. Migration accounted for 19.4%, while births and deaths accounted for -5.2%.

Most of the population (as of 2000) speaks French (177 or 77.3%) as their first language, German is the second most common (42 or 18.3%) and Portuguese is the third (4 or 1.7%). There are 2 people who speak Italian.

As of 2008, the population was 53.2% male and 46.8% female. The population was made up of 122 Swiss men (43.9% of the population) and 26 (9.4%) non-Swiss men. There were 110 Swiss women (39.6%) and 20 (7.2%) non-Swiss women. Of the population in the municipality, 44 or about 19.2% were born in Crésuz and lived there in 2000. There were 101 or 44.1% who were born in the same canton, while 39 or 17.0% were born somewhere else in Switzerland, and 42 or 18.3% were born outside of Switzerland.

As of 2000, children and teenagers (0–19 years old) make up 14.8% of the population, while adults (20–64 years old) make up 59.8% and seniors (over 64 years old) make up 25.3%.

As of 2000, there were 65 people who were single and never married in the municipality. There were 128 married individuals, 17 widows or widowers and 19 individuals who are divorced.

As of 2000, there were 110 private households in the municipality, and an average of 2. persons per household. There were 42 households that consist of only one person and 2 households with five or more people. In 2000, a total of 109 apartments (40.7% of the total) were permanently occupied, while 136 apartments (50.7%) were seasonally occupied and 23 apartments (8.6%) were empty. The vacancy rate for the municipality, in 2010, was 1.79%.

The historical population is given in the following chart:

== Politics ==
In the 2011 federal election the most popular party was the SP which received 29.3% of the vote. The next three most popular parties were the SVP (28.3%), the CVP (19.7%) and the FDP (8.0%). The SPS improved their position in Crésuz rising to first, from third in 2007 (with 19.4%)

The SVP retained about the same popularity (30.0% in 2007), the CVP moved from first in 2007 (with 30.7%) to third and the FDP retained about the same popularity (11.6% in 2007). A total of 116 votes were cast in this election, of which 5 or 4.3% were invalid.

== Economy ==
As of 2010, Crésuz had an unemployment rate of 4.9%. As of 2008, there was 1 person employed in the primary economic sector and about 1 business involved in this sector. 4 people were employed in the secondary sector and there were 3 businesses in this sector. 14 people were employed in the tertiary sector, with 3 businesses in this sector. There were 103 residents of the municipality who were employed in some capacity, of which females made up 40.8% of the workforce.

In 2008 the total number of full-time equivalent jobs was 14. There were no jobs in the primary sector. The number of jobs in the secondary sector was 3 of which 1 was in manufacturing and 2 were in construction. The number of jobs in the tertiary sector was 11. In the tertiary sector; 7 or 63.6% were in a hotel or restaurant and 2 or 18.2% were in education.

In 2000, there were 7 workers who commuted into the municipality and 82 workers who commuted away. The municipality is a net exporter of workers, with about 11.7 workers leaving the municipality for every one entering. Of the working population, 1.9% used public transportation to get to work, and 81.6% used a private car.

== Religion ==
From the 2000 census, 185 or 80.8% were Roman Catholic, while 22 or 9.6% belonged to the Swiss Reformed Church. There was 1 person who was Buddhist. 18 (or about 7.86% of the population) belonged to no church, are agnostic or atheist, and 3 individuals (or about 1.31% of the population) did not answer the question.

== Education ==
In Crésuz about 85 or (37.1%) of the population have completed non-mandatory upper secondary education, and 41 or (17.9%) have completed additional higher education (either university or a Fachhochschule). Of the 41 who completed tertiary schooling, 48.8% were Swiss men, 24.4% were Swiss women, 19.5% were non-Swiss men.

The Canton of Fribourg school system provides one year of non-obligatory Kindergarten, followed by six years of Primary school. This is followed by three years of obligatory lower Secondary school where the students are separated according to ability and aptitude. Following the lower Secondary students may attend a three or four year optional upper Secondary school. The upper Secondary school is divided into gymnasium (university preparatory) and vocational programs. After they finish the upper Secondary program, students may choose to attend a Tertiary school or continue their apprenticeship.

During the 2010-11 school year, there were a total of 33 students attending 2 classes in Crésuz. A total of 18 students from the municipality attended any school, either in the municipality or outside of it. There were 2 kindergarten classes with a total of 33 students in the municipality. The municipality had no primary school classes, but 6 students attended primary school in a neighboring municipality. During the same year, there were no lower secondary classes in the municipality, but 3 students attended lower secondary school in a neighboring municipality. There were no upper Secondary classes or vocational classes, but there was one upper Secondary student and 6 upper Secondary vocational students who attended classes in another municipality. The municipality had no non-university Tertiary classes. who attended classes in another municipality.

As of 2000, there were 20 students in Crésuz who came from another municipality, while 24 residents attended schools outside the municipality.
