= Habkern =

- Municipality
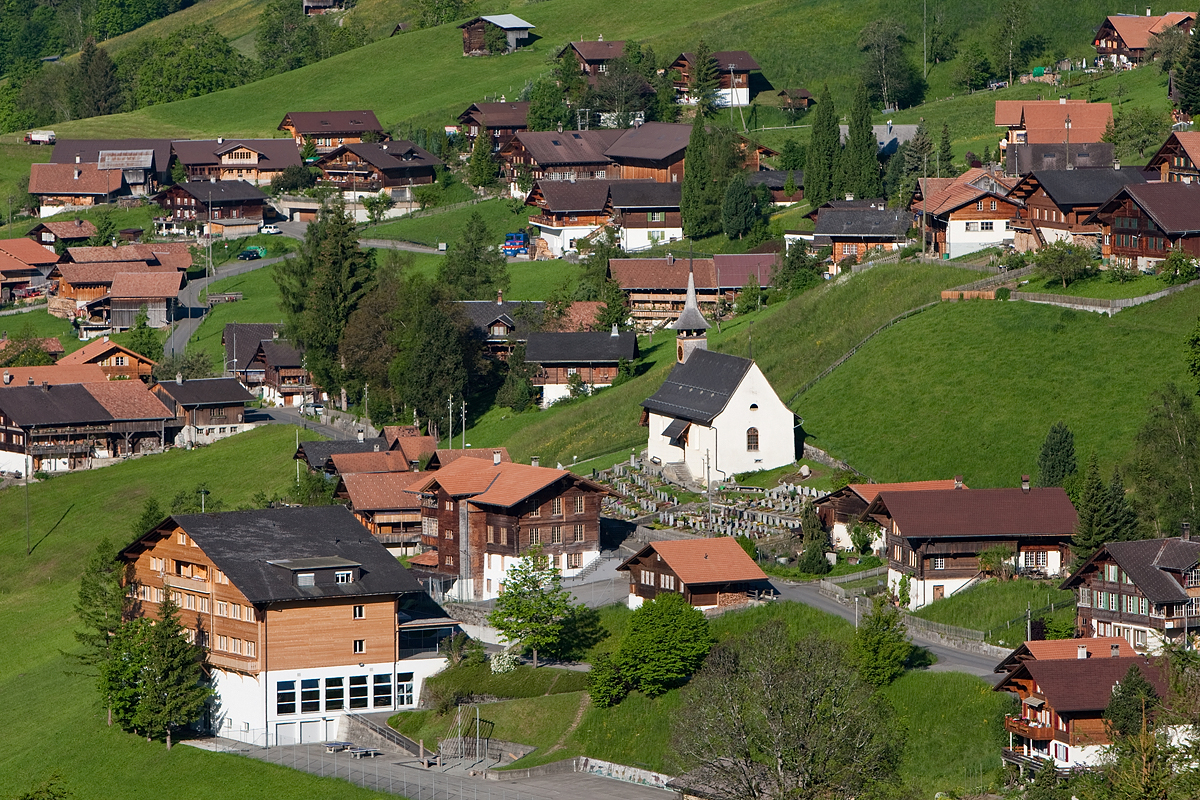

- Flag Coat of arms
- Location of Habkern
- Location within Switzerland Location within Canton of Bern
- Coordinates: 46°43′N 7°51′E
- Country: Switzerland
- Canton: Bern
- District: Interlaken-Oberhasli

Government
  - Executive: Gemeinderat with 9 members
  - Mayor: Gemeindepräsident(in); Christoph Häni (as of 2026)

Area
  - Total: 51.1 km^{2} (19.7 sq mi)
- Elevation: 1,055 m (3,461 ft)

Population (December 2020)
  - Total: 634
  - Density: 12.4/km^{2} (32.1/sq mi)
- Time zone: UTC+01:00 (CET)
  - Summer (DST): UTC+02:00 (CEST)
- Postal code: 3804
- SFOS number: 579
- ISO 3166 code: CH-BE
- Surrounded by: Schangnau, Flühli (LU), Oberried am Brienzersee, Niederried bei Interlaken, Unterseen, Beatenberg and Eriz
- Website: www.habkern.ch

Habkern is a municipality in the Interlaken-Oberhasli administrative district in the canton of Bern in Switzerland. The municipality includes the settlements of Bohlseiten, Bort, Schwendi and Mittelbäuert.

== Origin of the name ==
The name Habkern comes from the Old High German word habuh (“hawk”) and the ending -arra, indicating that something is in large numbers. Habkern is thus “the place where there are many hawks”.

== History ==
Habkern is first mentioned in 1275 as Habcherron.

The land around Habkern was originally owned by the King of the Romans. In 1275, King Rudolph I granted the village to the Freiherr of Eschenbach. It was held briefly by the Habsburg family in Austria before they granted it to Interlaken Monastery. The monastery remained a supporter of the House of Habsburg after the Swiss Confederation gained de facto independence from the Habsburgs in the early 14th century. The monastery launched several raids into Unterwalden to support Habsburg ambitions. In response, in 1342, troops from Unterwalden attacked and burned Habkern. A few years later, in 1348−49, the village unsuccessfully rebelled against the monastery. In 1528, the city of Bern adopted the new faith of the Protestant Reformation and began imposing it on the Bernese Oberland. Habkern joined many other villages and the monastery in an unsuccessful rebellion against the new faith. After Bern imposed its will on the Oberland, they secularized the monastery and annexed all the monastery lands. By 1538, a traveling pastor preached one sermon a month in the filial church in Habkern.

Traditionally, the village economy relied on farming on the valley floors and seasonal alpine herding in the mountain meadows. The scattered farms combined into four Bäuerten (“farmers’ collectives”) to manage alpine meadows. The first modern road to the village was built in 1828 from the Unterseen valley. As mechanization allowed farms to operate with fewer workers, many residents were forced to move to the cities of the Swiss Plateau or emigrate to Germany or the United States. By the 20th century, there was some tourism in the municipality, and two hotels, several vacation homes and a ski lift were built. About one-third of the workforce commutes to jobs in Interlaken or the surrounding municipalities.

== Geography ==
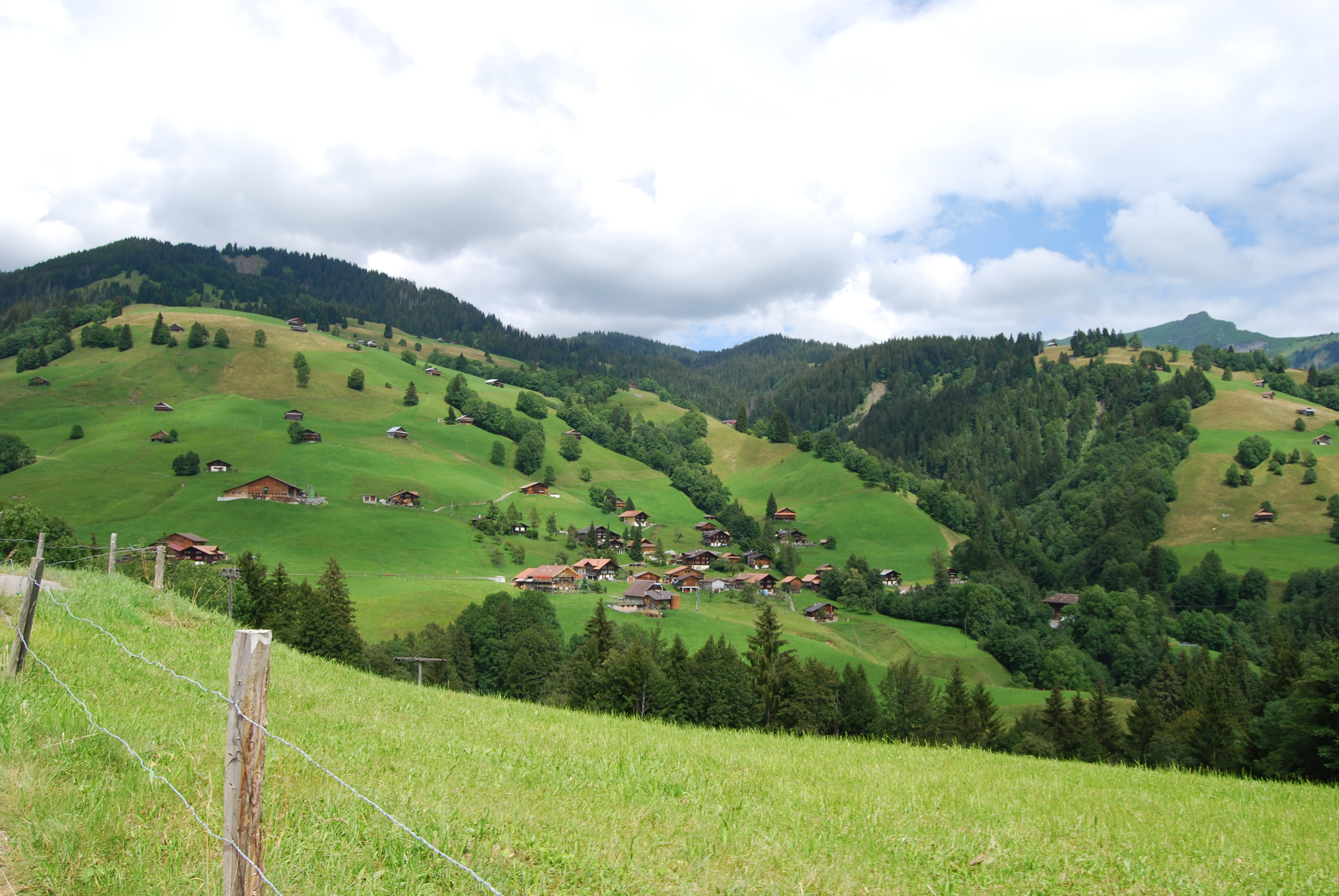
Habkern village

Aerial view (1952)

Habkern has an area of 51.03 km^{2} (19.70 sq mi). Of this area, 20.11 km^{2} (7.76 mi^{2}) or 39.4% is used for agricultural purposes, while 25.5 km^{2} (9.8 mi^{2}) or 49.9% is forested. Of the rest of the land, 0.67 km^{2} (0.26 mi^{2}) or 1.3% is settled (buildings or roads), 0.41 km^{2} (0.16 mi^{2}) or 0.8% is either rivers or lakes and 4.39 km^{2} (1.69 mi^{2}) or 8.6% is unproductive land.

Of the built up area, housing and buildings made up 0.5% and transportation infrastructure made up 0.6%. Out of the forested land, 43.2% of the total land area is heavily forested, and 6.3% is covered with orchards or small clusters of trees. Of the agricultural land, 8.8% is pastures and 30.5% is used for alpine pastures. All the water in the municipality is flowing water. Of the unproductive areas, 5.1% is unproductive vegetation, and 3.5% is too rocky for vegetation.

The municipality is made up a number of scattered settlements without a central village. The major settlements are all small farming settlements, with some of the largest being: Bohlseiten, Bort, Schwendi and Mittelbäuert. Habkern lies in the Bernese Oberland at the edge of the Emmental, which flows from the Hohngant massif. Underground is the Siebenhengste-Hohgant-Höhle, a karst cave system.

On 31 December 2009, Amtsbezirk Interlaken, the municipality's former district, was dissolved. On the following day, 1 January 2010, it joined the newly created Verwaltungskreis Interlaken-Oberhasli.

== Coat of arms ==
The blazon of the municipal coat of arms is Argent on a rock Azure an Accipiter statant proper.

== Demographics ==
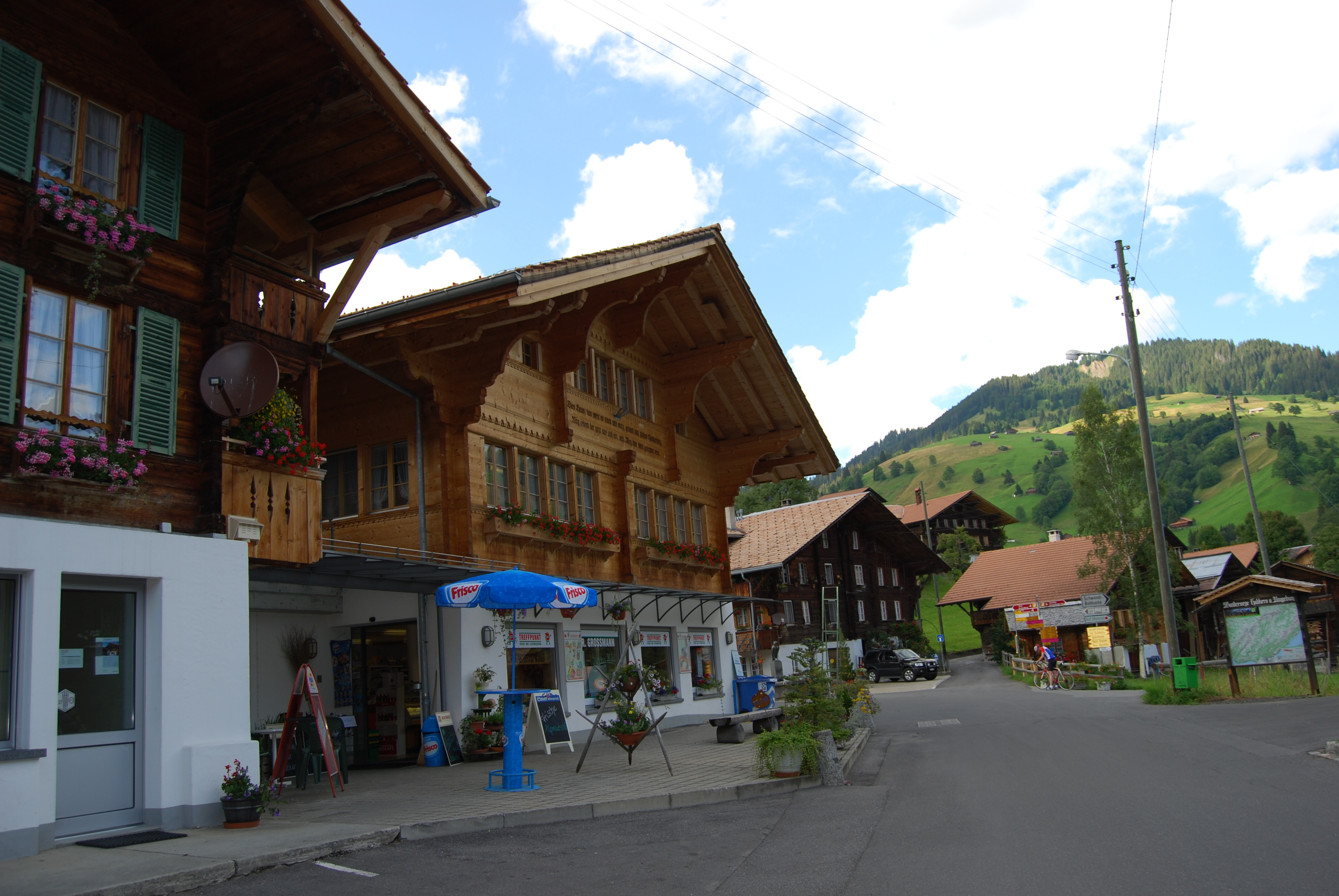
The center of Habkern village

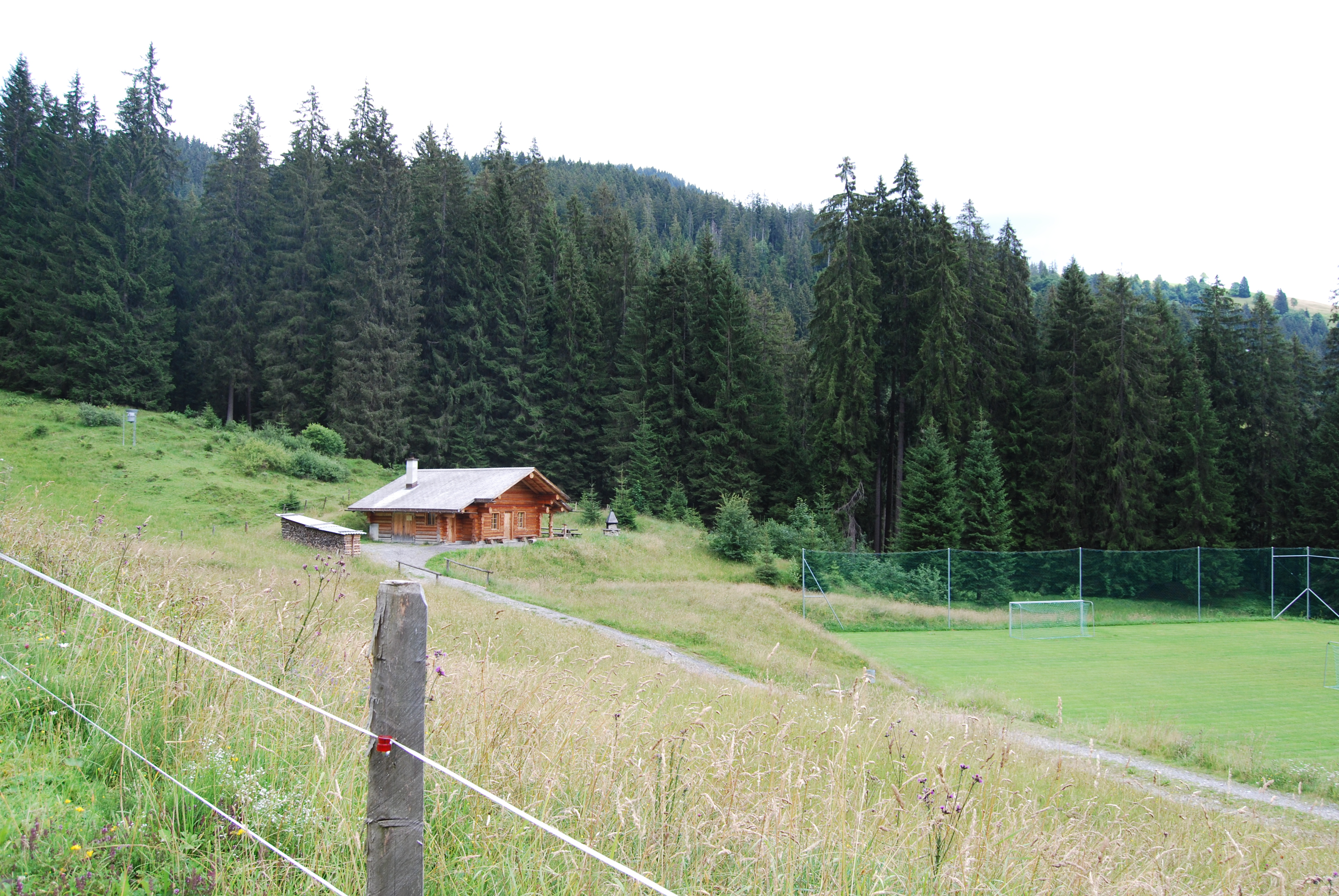
Cabin and Association football field

Habkern had a population (as of December 2020) of 634. As of 2010, 5.8% of the population were resident foreign nationals. In the period from 2000 to 2010, the population changed at a rate of −2%. Migration accounted for -2.9%, while births and deaths accounted for 1.4%.

Most of the population (as of 2000) speaks German (616 or 98.7%) as their first language, French is the second most common (1 or 0.2%) and English is the third (1 or 0.2%).

As of 2008, the population was 49.5% male and 50.5% female. The population was made up of 297 Swiss men (46.6% of the population) and 19 (3.0%) non-Swiss men. There were 304 Swiss women (47.6%) and 18 (2.8%) non-Swiss women. Of the population in the municipality, 410 or about 65.7% were born in Habkern and lived there in 2000. There were 140 or 22.4% who were born in the same canton, while 36 or 5.8% were born somewhere else in Switzerland, and 30 or 4.8% were born outside of Switzerland.

As of 2010, children and teenagers (0–19 years old) made up 24.8% of the population, while adults (20–64 years old) made up 55%, and seniors (over 64 years old) made up 20.2%.

As of 2000, there were 251 people who were single and never married in the municipality. There were 307 married individuals, 43 widows or widowers and 23 individuals who were divorced.

As of 2000, there were 79 households that consisted of only one person and 22 households with five or more people. In 2000, a total of 256 apartments (53.3% of the total) were permanently occupied, while 197 apartments (41.0%) were seasonally occupied and 27 apartments (5.6%) were empty. The vacancy rate for the municipality, in 2011, was 2.31%.

The historical population is given in the following chart:

== Politics ==
In the 2011 federal election, the most popular party was the Swiss People's Party (SVP) which received 65.8% of the vote. The next three most popular parties were the Conservative Democratic Party (BDP) (13.5%), the Federal Democratic Union of Switzerland (EDU) (4.4%) and the Social Democratic Party (SP) (4.3%). In the federal election, a total of 257 votes were cast, and the voter turnout was 52.9%.

== Economy ==
As of 2011, Habkern had an unemployment rate of 0.3%. As of 2008, there were a total of 250 people employed in the municipality. Of these, there were 170 people employed in the primary economic sector and about 60 businesses involved in this sector. Twenty-eight people were employed in the secondary sector and there were seven businesses in this sector. Fifty-two people were employed in the tertiary sector, with 14 businesses in this sector. There were 324 residents of the municipality who were employed in some capacity, of which females made up 37.7% of the workforce.

In 2008 there were a total of 151 full-time equivalent jobs. The number of jobs in the primary sector was 87, all of which were in agriculture. The number of jobs in the secondary sector was 26 of which four or (15.4%) were in manufacturing and 22 (84.6%) were in construction. The number of jobs in the tertiary sector was 38. In the tertiary sector, nine or 23.7% were in wholesale or retail sales or the repair of motor vehicles, seven or 18.4% were in the movement and storage of goods, 10 or 26.3% were in a hotel or restaurant, eight or 21.1% were in education.

In 2000, there were nine workers who commuted into the municipality and 158 workers who commuted away. The municipality was a net exporter of workers, with about 17.6 workers leaving the municipality for every one entering. Of the working population, 9.9% used public transportation to get to work, and 51.2% used a private car.

== Religion ==
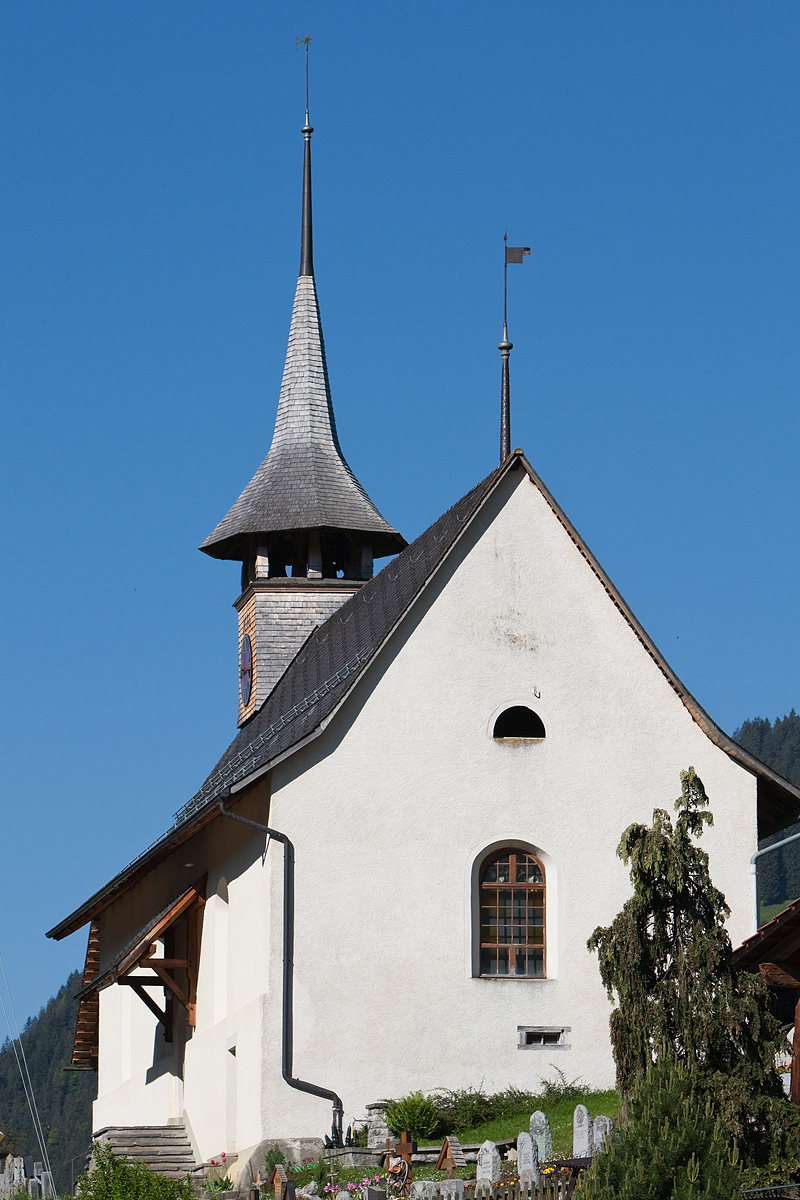
Habkern village church

From the 2000 census, 17 or 2.7% were Roman Catholic, while 535 or 85.7% belonged to the Swiss Reformed Church. Of the rest of the population, there was one member of an Orthodox church, and there were 78 individuals (or about 12.50% of the population) who belonged to another Christian church. There were two individuals who were Buddhist and five individuals who were Hindu. Fourteen (or about 2.24% of the population) belonged to no church, were agnostic or atheist, and 11 individuals (or about 1.76% of the population) did not answer the question.

== Education ==
In Habkern, about 221 or (35.4%) of the population have completed non-mandatory upper secondary education, and 28 or (4.5%) have completed additional higher education (either university or a Fachhochschule). Of the 28 who completed tertiary schooling, 57.1% were Swiss men, 14.3% were Swiss women, 21.4% were non-Swiss men.

The canton of Bern school system provides one year of non-obligatory Kindergarten, followed by six years of primary school. This is followed by three years of obligatory lower secondary school where the students are separated according to ability and aptitude. Following the lower secondary, students may attend additional schooling, or they may enter an apprenticeship.

During the 2010–11 school year, there were a total of 81 students attending classes in Habkern. There was one kindergarten class with a total of 10 students in the municipality. The municipality had three primary classes and 49 students. Of the primary students, 2.0% were permanent or temporary residents of Switzerland (not citizens) and 2.0% had a mother language different from the classroom language. During the same year, there was one lower secondary class with a total of 22 students. There were 9.1% who were permanent or temporary residents of Switzerland (not citizens).

As of 2000, there were 15 students from Habkern who attended schools outside the municipality.
