= Plasselb =

- Municipality
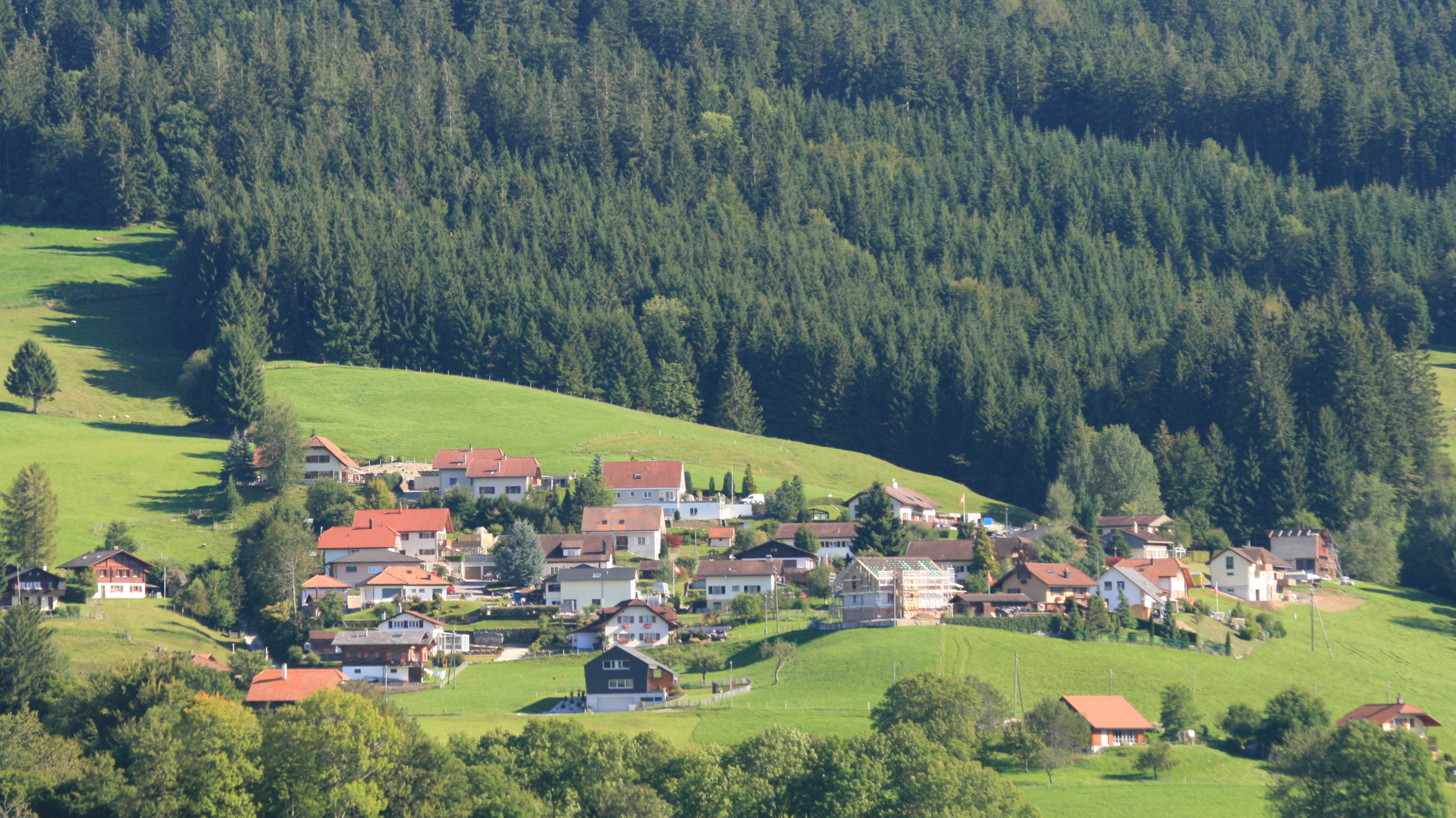
- Plasselb village

- Coat of arms
- Location of Plasselb
- Location within Switzerland Location within Canton of Fribourg
- Coordinates: 46°44′N 7°15′E
- Country: Switzerland
- Canton: Fribourg
- District: Sense

Government
  - Mayor: Gemeindeammann

Area
  - Total: 18.11 km^{2} (6.99 sq mi)
- Elevation: 856 m (2,808 ft)

Population (December 2020)
  - Total: 1,010
  - Density: 55.8/km^{2} (144/sq mi)
- Time zone: UTC+01:00 (CET)
  - Summer (DST): UTC+02:00 (CEST)
- Postal code: 1737
- SFOS number: 2300
- ISO 3166 code: CH-FR
- Surrounded by: Val-de-Charmey, Giffers, La Roche, Le Mouret, Plaffeien, Sankt Silvester
- Website: www.plasselb.ch

Plasselb (Arpitan: Pllanassiva, locally Pyanachiva [pjanaˈʃiva]) is a municipality in the district of Sense in the canton of Fribourg in Switzerland. It is one of the municipalities with a large majority of German speakers in the mostly French speaking Canton of Fribourg.

== History ==
Plasselb is first mentioned in 1324 as Plannaseyva.

== Geography ==
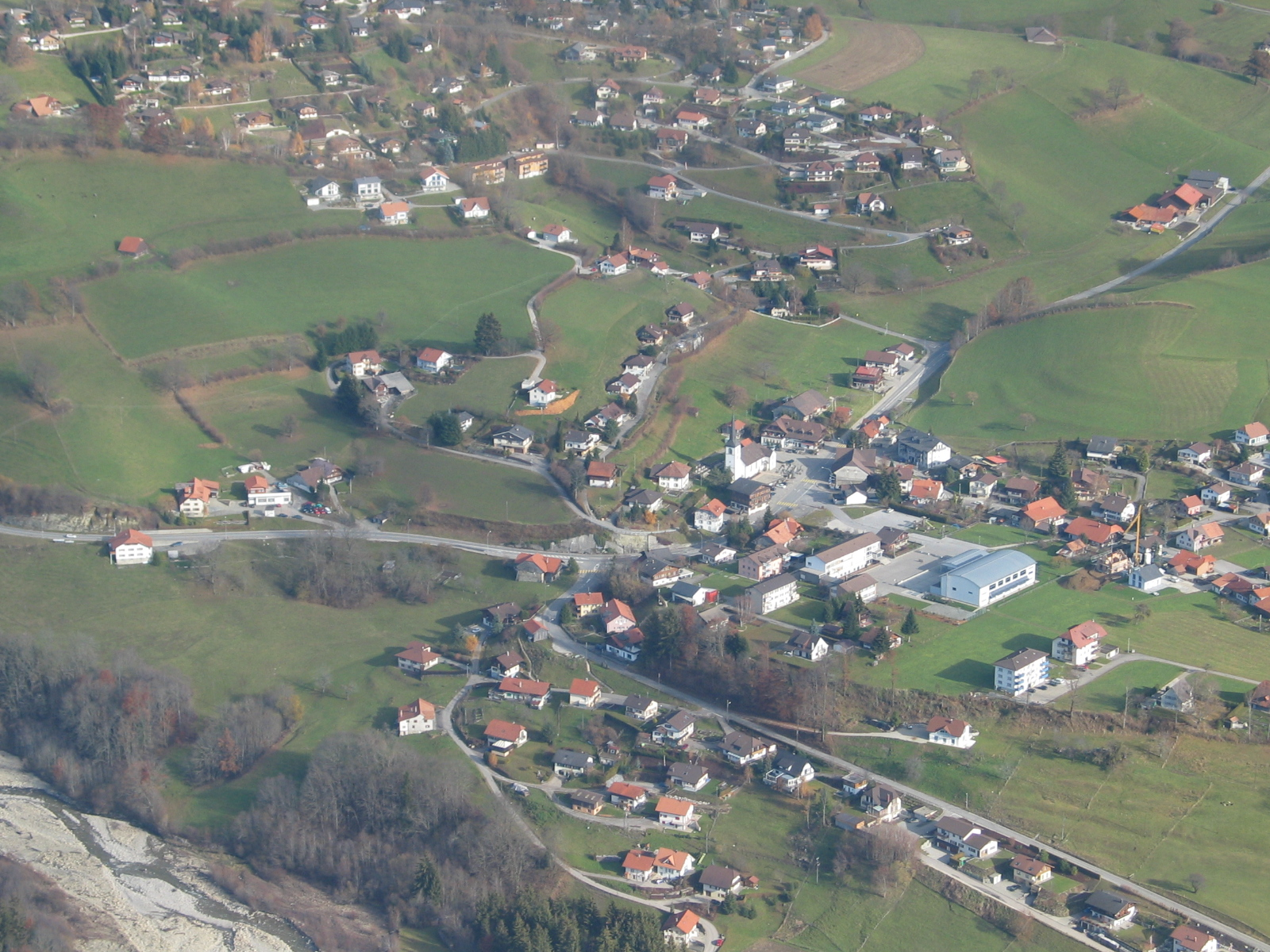
Aerial view of Plasselb

Plasselb has an area of 18.16 km^{2} (7.01 sq mi). Of this area, 6.73 km^{2} (2.60 mi^{2}) or 37.1% is used for agricultural purposes, while 10.06 km^{2} (3.88 mi^{2}) or 55.5% is forested. Of the rest of the land, 0.73 km^{2} (0.28 mi^{2}) or 4.0% is settled (buildings or roads), 0.2 km^{2} (0.077 mi^{2}) or 1.1% is either rivers or lakes and 0.39 km^{2} (0.15 mi^{2}) or 2.2% is unproductive land.

Of the built up area, housing and buildings made up 2.0% and transportation infrastructure made up 1.6%. Out of the forested land, 51.9% of the total land area is heavily forested and 3.6% is covered with orchards or small clusters of trees. Of the agricultural land, 9.6% is pastures and 27.2% is used for alpine pastures. All the water in the municipality is flowing water.

The municipality is located in the Sense district, at the foot of the Schweinsberg at the entrance to the Plasselbschlund. It consists of the village of Plasselb and, since 1971, Neuhaus.

== Coat of arms ==
The blazon of the municipal coat of arms is Sable a Bar Argent and overall a Deer salient Or.

== Demographics ==
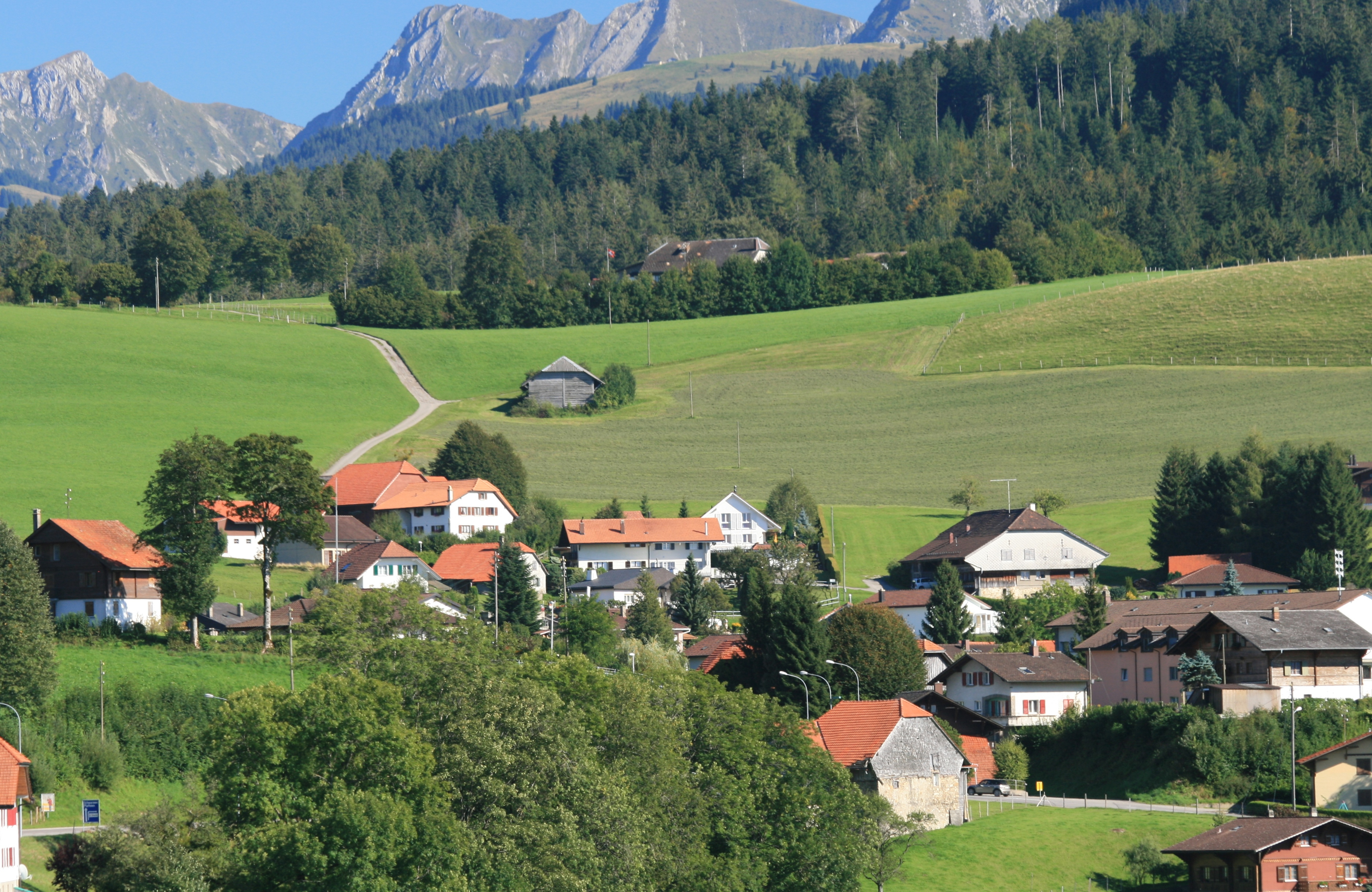
Buildings in Plasselb

Plasselb has a population (as of December 2020) of 1,010. As of 2008, 7.7% of the population are resident foreign nationals. Over the last 10 years (2000–2010) the population has changed at a rate of -3.2%. Migration accounted for -5.2%, while births and deaths accounted for 0.7%.

Most of the population (as of 2000) speaks German (913 or 93.2%) as their first language, French is the second most common (22 or 2.2%) and Albanian is the third (21 or 2.1%). There are 2 people who speak Italian.

As of 2008, the population was 52.1% male and 47.9% female. The population was made up of 465 Swiss men (47.0% of the population) and 50 (5.1%) non-Swiss men. There were 432 Swiss women (43.7%) and 42 (4.2%) non-Swiss women. Of the population in the municipality, 469 or about 47.9% were born in Plasselb and lived there in 2000. There were 298 or 30.4% who were born in the same canton, while 112 or 11.4% were born somewhere else in Switzerland, and 77 or 7.9% were born outside of Switzerland.

As of 2000, children and teenagers (0–19 years old) make up 24.7% of the population, while adults (20–64 years old) make up 65% and seniors (over 64 years old) make up 10.3%.

As of 2000, there were 419 people who were single and never married in the municipality. There were 479 married individuals, 39 widows or widowers and 43 individuals who are divorced.

As of 2000, there were 391 private households in the municipality, and an average of 2.5 persons per household. There were 99 households that consist of only one person and 31 households with five or more people. In 2000, a total of 376 apartments (82.8% of the total) were permanently occupied, while 55 apartments (12.1%) were seasonally occupied and 23 apartments (5.1%) were empty. As of 2009, the construction rate of new housing units was 1 new units per 1000 residents. The vacancy rate for the municipality, in 2010, was 3.13%.

The historical population is given in the following chart:

== Politics ==
In the 2011 federal election the most popular party was the SVP which received 38.8% of the vote. The next three most popular parties were the CVP (15.8%), the FDP (12.5%) and the SPS (11.6%).

The SVP gained an additional 10.5% of the vote from the 2007 Federal election (28.3% in 2007 vs 38.8% in 2011). The CVP lost popularity (26.7% in 2007), the FDP retained about the same popularity (16.5% in 2007) and the SPS moved from below fourth place in 2007 to fourth. A total of 331 votes were cast in this election, of which 5 or 1.5% were invalid.

== Economy ==
As of 2010, Plasselb had an unemployment rate of 1.6%. As of 2008, there were 46 people employed in the primary economic sector and about 15 businesses involved in this sector. 36 people were employed in the secondary sector and there were 11 businesses in this sector. 60 people were employed in the tertiary sector, with 25 businesses in this sector. There were 525 residents of the municipality who were employed in some capacity, of which females made up 39.8% of the workforce.

In 2008 the total number of full-time equivalent jobs was 111. The number of jobs in the primary sector was 31, of which 18 were in agriculture and 13 were in forestry or lumber production. The number of jobs in the secondary sector was 32 of which 17 or (53.1%) were in manufacturing and 15 (46.9%) were in construction. The number of jobs in the tertiary sector was 48. In the tertiary sector; 14 or 29.2% were in wholesale or retail sales or the repair of motor vehicles, 4 or 8.3% were in the movement and storage of goods, 10 or 20.8% were in a hotel or restaurant, 2 or 4.2% were in the information industry, 1 was the insurance or financial industry, 1 was a technical professional or scientist, 5 or 10.4% were in education and 1 was in health care.

In 2000, there were 34 workers who commuted into the municipality and 419 workers who commuted away. The municipality is a net exporter of workers, with about 12.3 workers leaving the municipality for every one entering. Of the working population, 9.7% used public transportation to get to work, and 72.6% used a private car.

== Religion ==
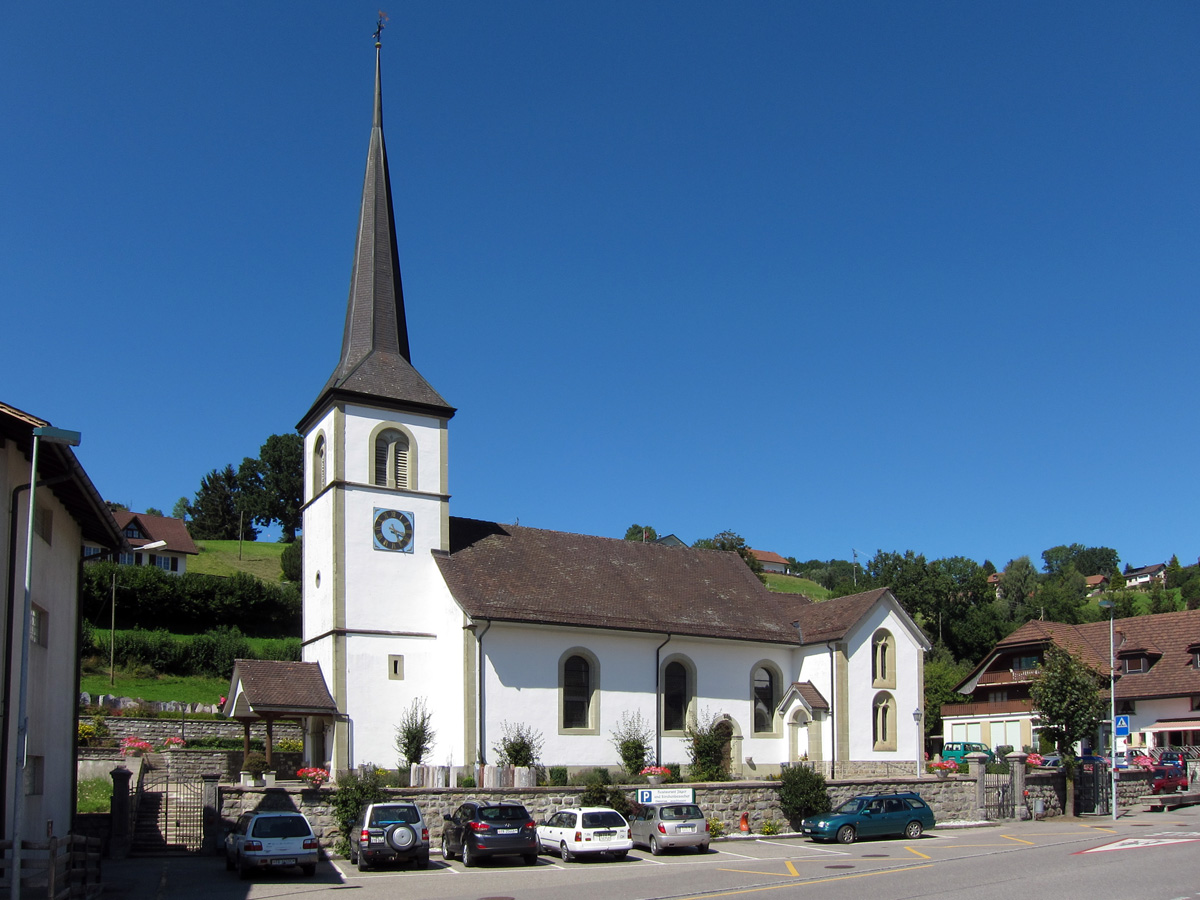
Village church in Plasselb

From the 2000 census, 797 or 81.3% were Roman Catholic, while 72 or 7.3% belonged to the Swiss Reformed Church. Of the rest of the population, there were 3 members of an Orthodox church (or about 0.31% of the population), there was 1 individual who belongs to the Christian Catholic Church, and there were 10 individuals (or about 1.02% of the population) who belonged to another Christian church. There were 36 (or about 3.67% of the population) who were Islamic. 42 (or about 4.29% of the population) belonged to no church, are agnostic or atheist, and 23 individuals (or about 2.35% of the population) did not answer the question.

== Education ==
In Plasselb about 346 or (35.3%) of the population have completed non-mandatory upper secondary education, and 71 or (7.2%) have completed additional higher education (either university or a Fachhochschule). Of the 71 who completed tertiary schooling, 69.0% were Swiss men, 16.9% were Swiss women, 11.3% were non-Swiss men.

The Canton of Fribourg school system provides one year of non-obligatory Kindergarten, followed by six years of Primary school. This is followed by three years of obligatory lower Secondary school where the students are separated according to ability and aptitude. Following the lower Secondary students may attend a three or four year optional upper Secondary school. The upper Secondary school is divided into gymnasium (university preparatory) and vocational programs. After they finish the upper Secondary program, students may choose to attend a Tertiary school or continue their apprenticeship.

During the 2010–11 school year, there were a total of 86 students attending 4 classes in Plasselb. A total of 163 students from the municipality attended any school, either in the municipality or outside of it. There was one kindergarten class with a total of 18 students in the municipality. The municipality had 3 primary classes and 68 students. During the same year, there were no lower secondary classes in the municipality, but 33 students attended lower secondary school in a neighboring municipality. There were no upper Secondary classes or vocational classes, but there were 17 upper Secondary students and 24 upper Secondary vocational students who attended classes in another municipality. The municipality had no non-university Tertiary classes, but there were 2 specialized Tertiary students who attended classes in another municipality.

As of 2000, there were 57 students from Plasselb who attended schools outside the municipality.
