= Gantrisch Regional Nature Park =

Nature park in Switzerland

- Regionale Naturpark Gantrisch
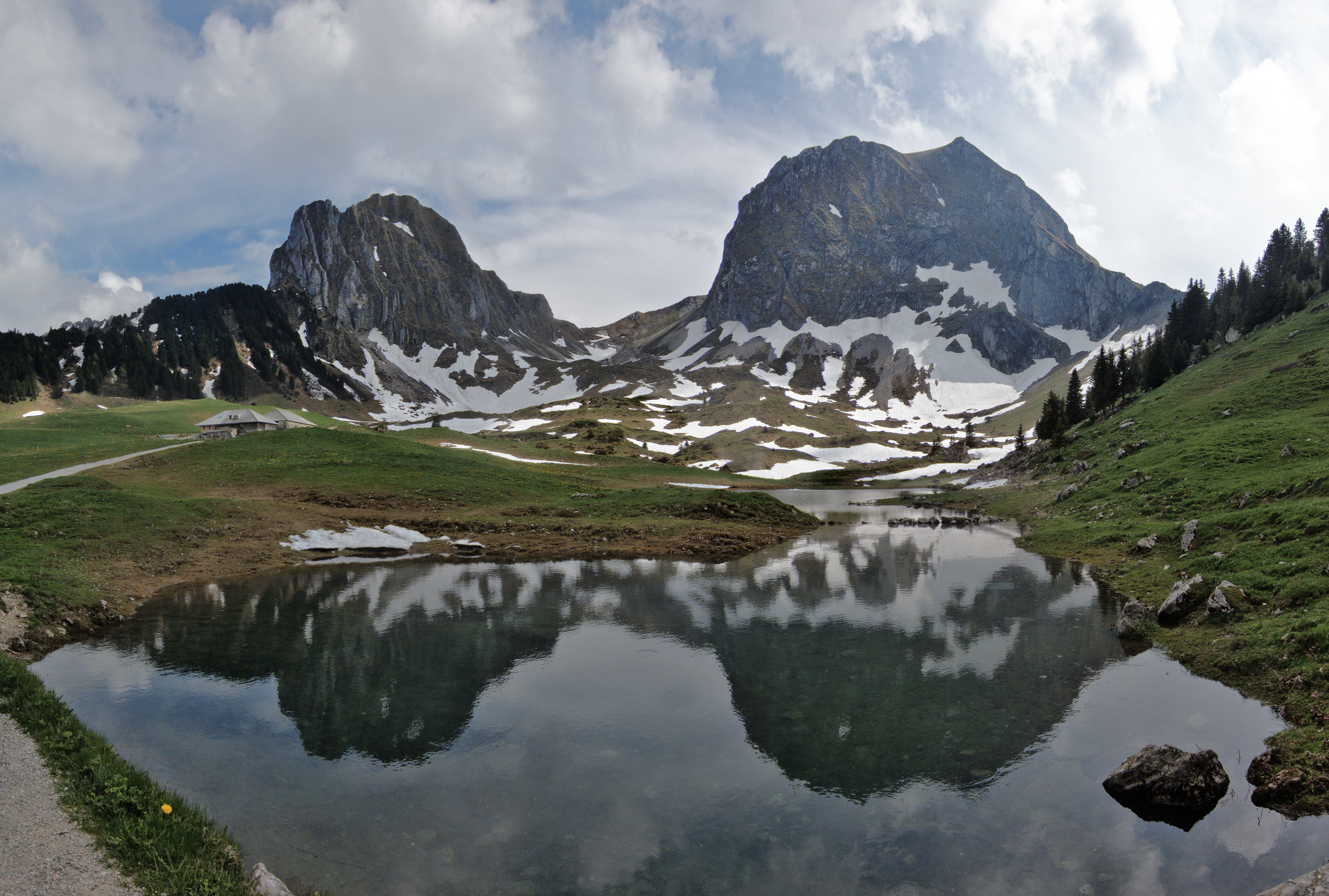
- Interactive map of Gantrisch Regional Nature Park
- Type: Regional nature park
- Location: Bern, Switzerland
- Nearest city: Schwarzenburg
- Coordinates: 46°47′N 7°25′E
- Area: 414
- Website: https://www.gantrisch.ch

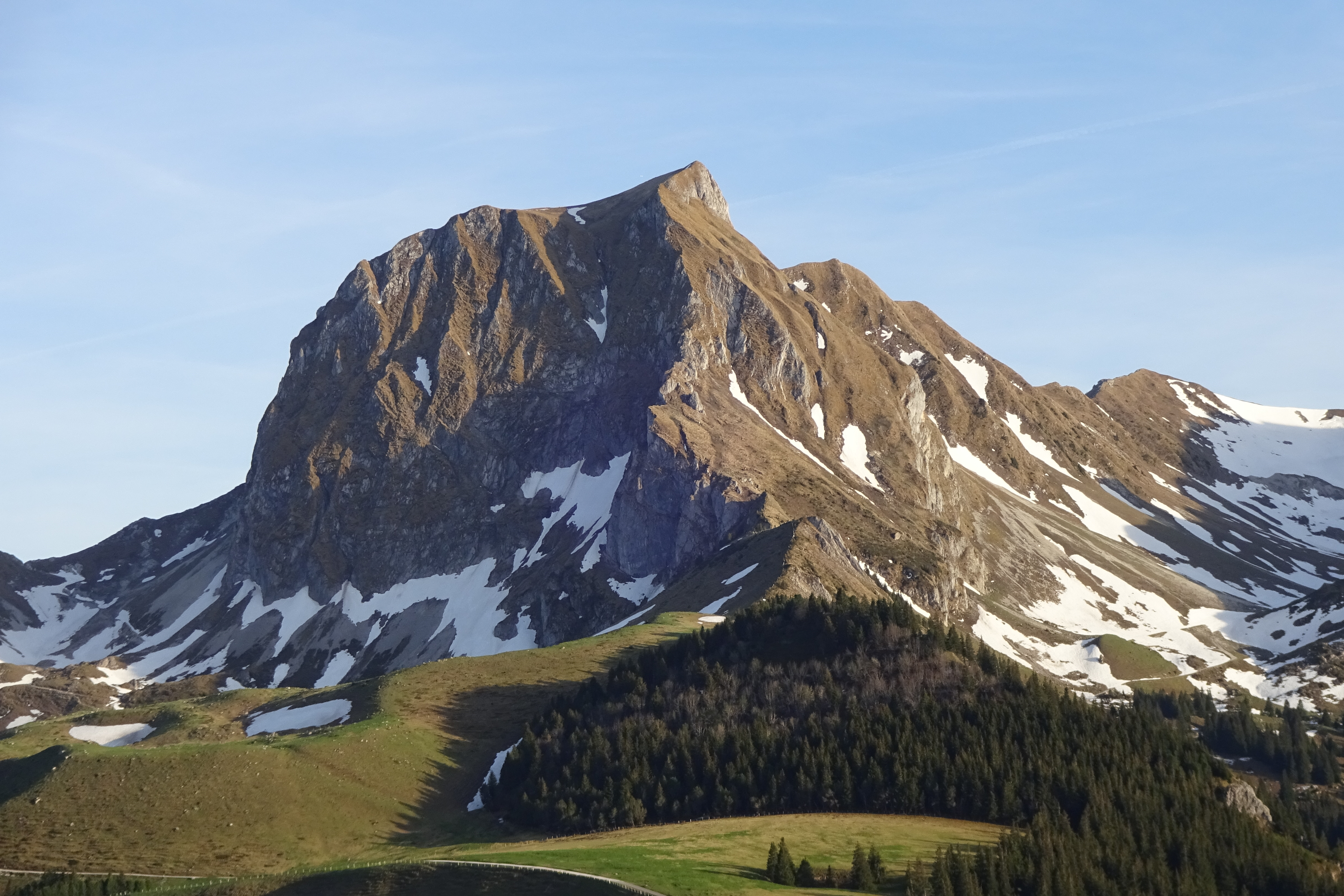
Gantrisch mountain

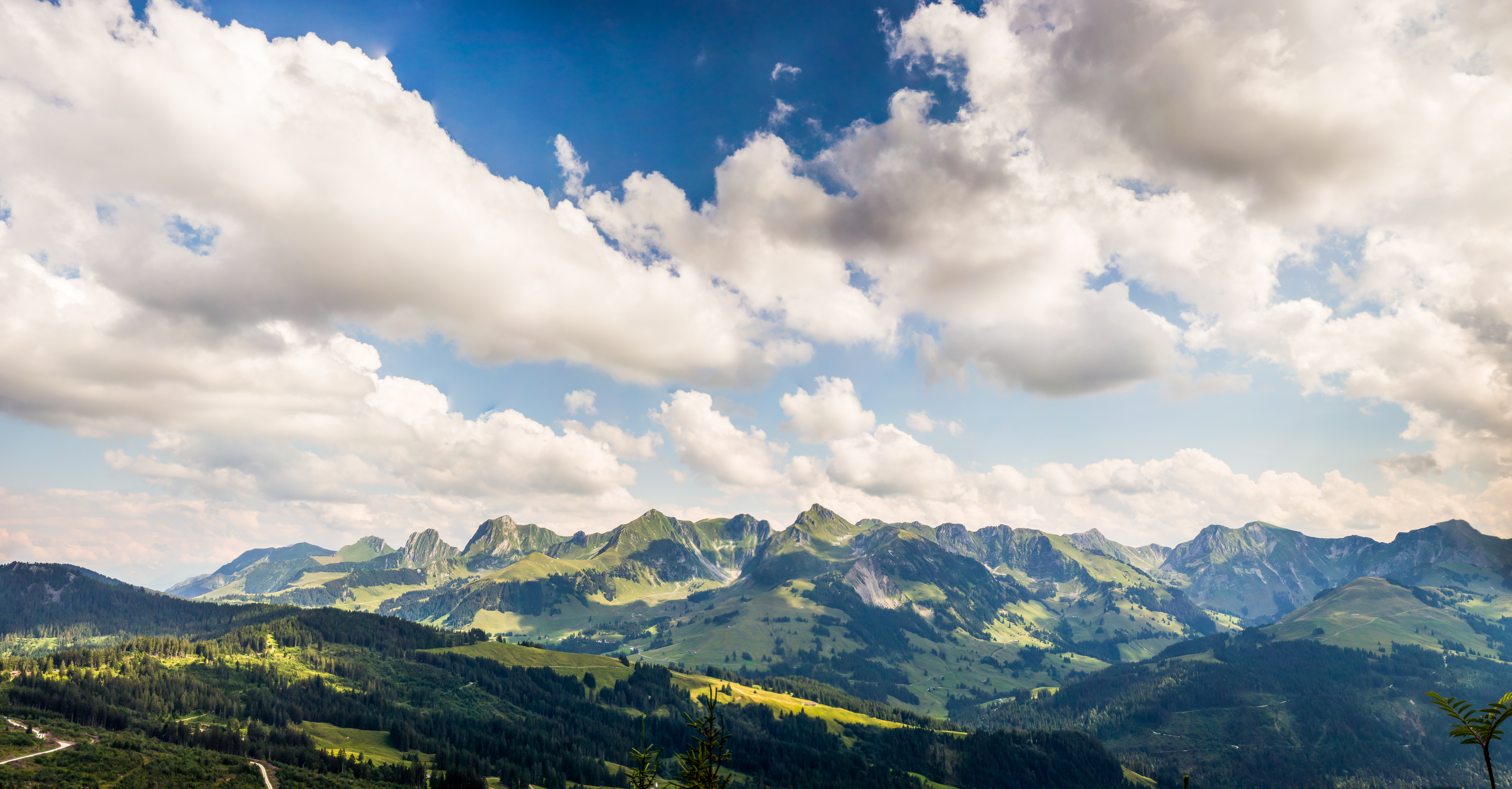

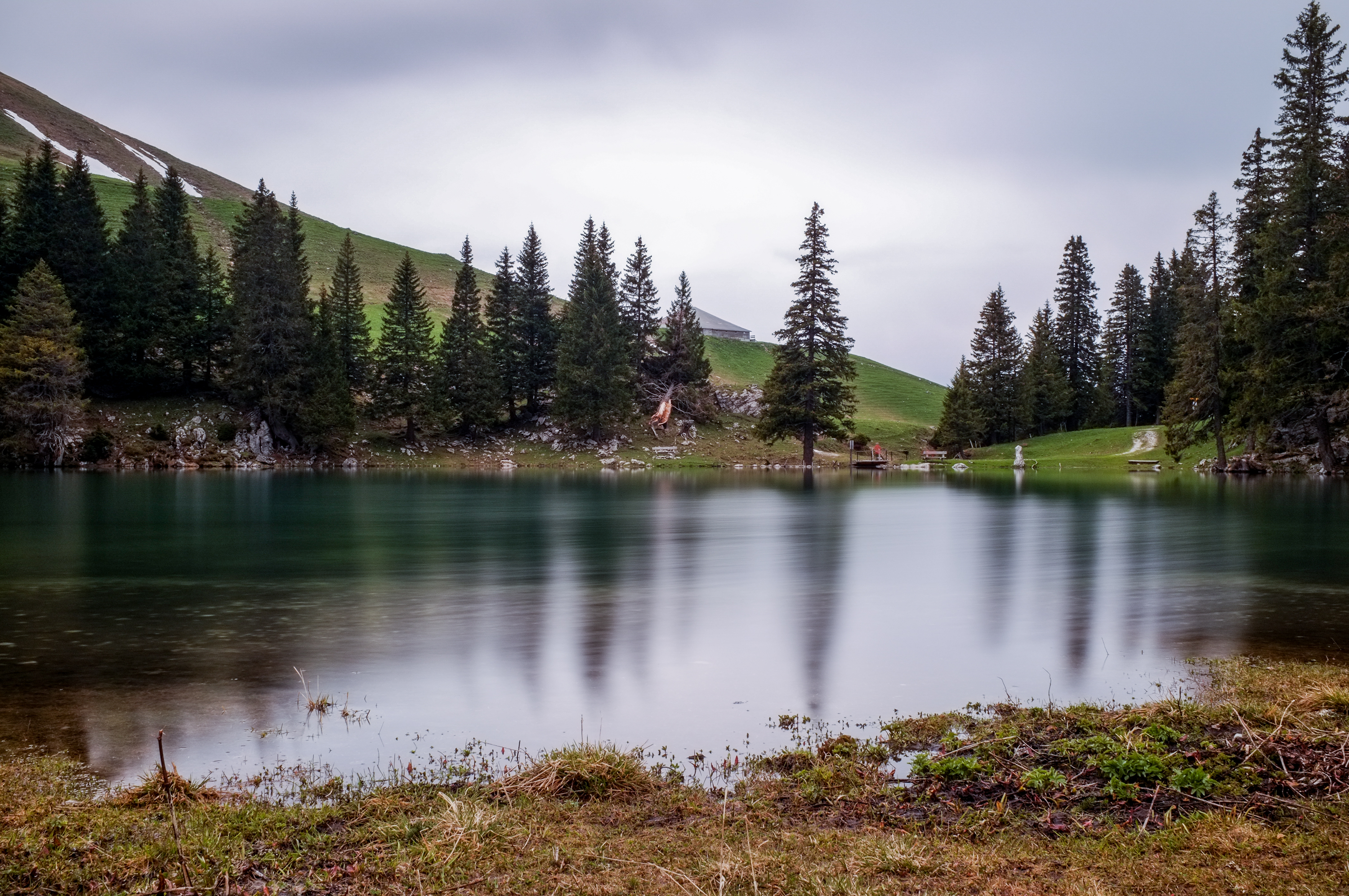

Gantrisch Regional Nature Park is one of 17 parks of national importance in Switzerland. Of its 19 park communities, 18 are in the canton of Bern and one in the canton of Fribourg. The Gantrisch Nature Park covers an area of 414 km² at an altitude between 510 m (Bern-Belp Airport) and 2239 m (Schafberg) and includes the Schwarzsee tourist region.

== Geography ==
The Gantrisch Nature Park lies between the three Swiss cities: Bern, Thun and Fribourg and is traversed by the Gürbe, Schwarzwasser and Sense. The park area includes the Längenberg, a lateral moraine of the Aare Glacier, and the Belpberg, which also consists partly of moraine material from the Aare Glacier. In the south, the Gantrisch Nature Park is bordered by the Gantrisch chain, which gives the nature park its name and contains the headwaters of the Gürbe. In the southwest of the nature park is the Schwarzsee and the primeval landscape of Brecca.

19 communities make up the Gantrisch Nature Park (as of 2021): Belp, Burgistein, Forst-Längenbühl, Gerzensee, Guggisberg, Gurzelen, Kaufdorf, Kirchdorf, Niedermuhlern, Oberbalm, Plaffeien, Riggisberg, Rüeggisberg, Rüschegg, Schwarzenburg, Thurnen, Toffen, Wald, Wattenwil.

== Landscapes of national importance ==
In accordance with Article 5 of the Federal Law on the Protection of Nature and Cultural Heritage, Switzerland keeps a Federal Inventory of Landscapes and Natural Monuments. Two of these areas are in the Gantrisch Nature Park:

- No. 1320, designation: Schwarzenburgerland mit Sense- und Schwarzwasser-Schluchten
- No. 1514, designation: Breccaschlund

== Sights ==
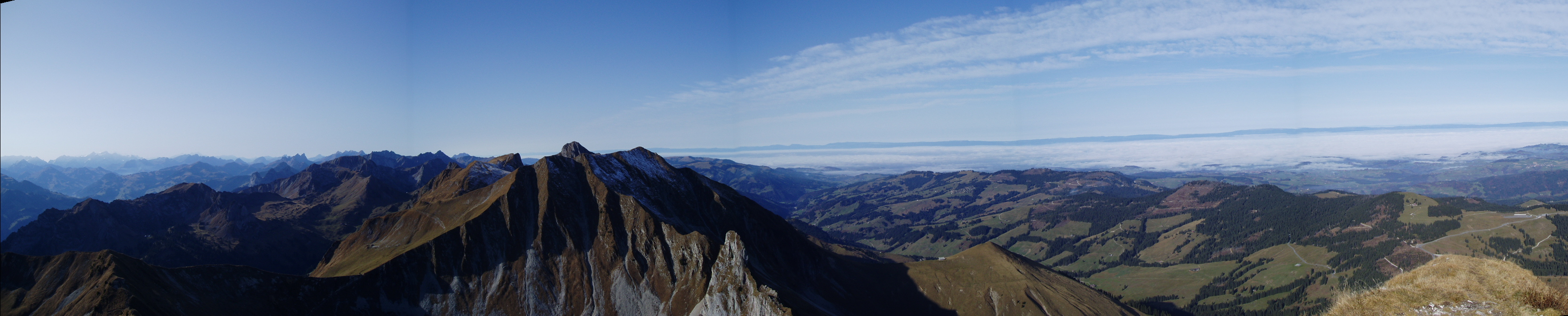
Panorama from Gantrisch

=== Viewpoints ===
- Guggershörnli
- Monument in honor of Rudolf von Tavel

=== Museums ===
- Abegg-Stiftung
- Vreneli-Museum

=== Historic buildings and facilities ===
- Schwarzenburg Castle
- Grasburg Castle
- Rüeggisberg Priory
- Gerzensee Castle
- Gerzensee Old Castle
- Gerzensee New Castle

=== Bodies of water ===
- Gerzensee
- Dittligsee
- Schwarzsee

=== Mountain peaks ===
- Gantrisch
- Kaiseregg
