= Chörblispitz =

Mountain in Switzerland

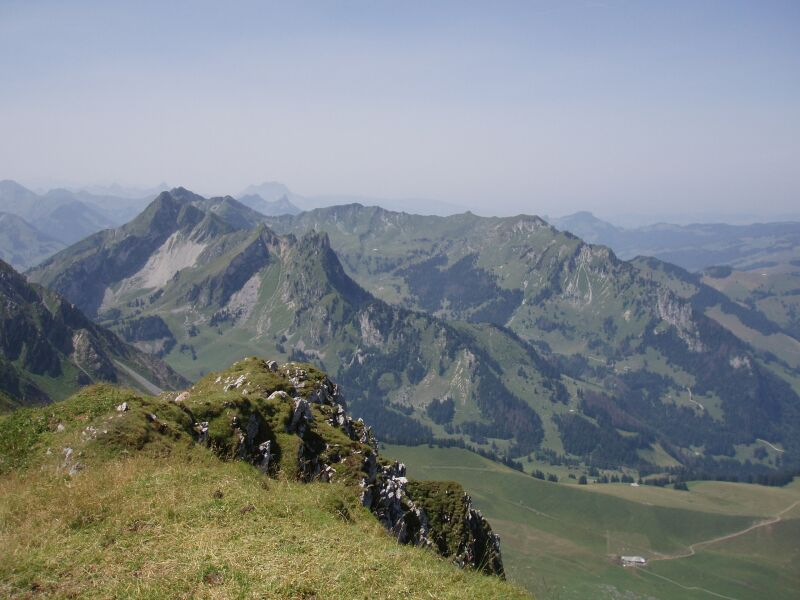
- The Chörblispitz (left mountain) from the Kaiseregg

Highest point
- Elevation: 2,103 m (6,900 ft)
- Prominence: 176 m (577 ft)
- Parent peak: Schopfenspitz
- Coordinates: 46°37′47″N 7°16′09″E

Geography
- Location within Switzerland
- Location: Fribourg, Switzerland
- Parent range: Swiss Prealps

The Chörblispitz (2,103 m) is a mountain of the Swiss Prealps, located north of Jaun in the canton of Fribourg. It lies on the range between the valley of the Breccaschlund and the valley of the Jaunbach.
