= Euschelspass =

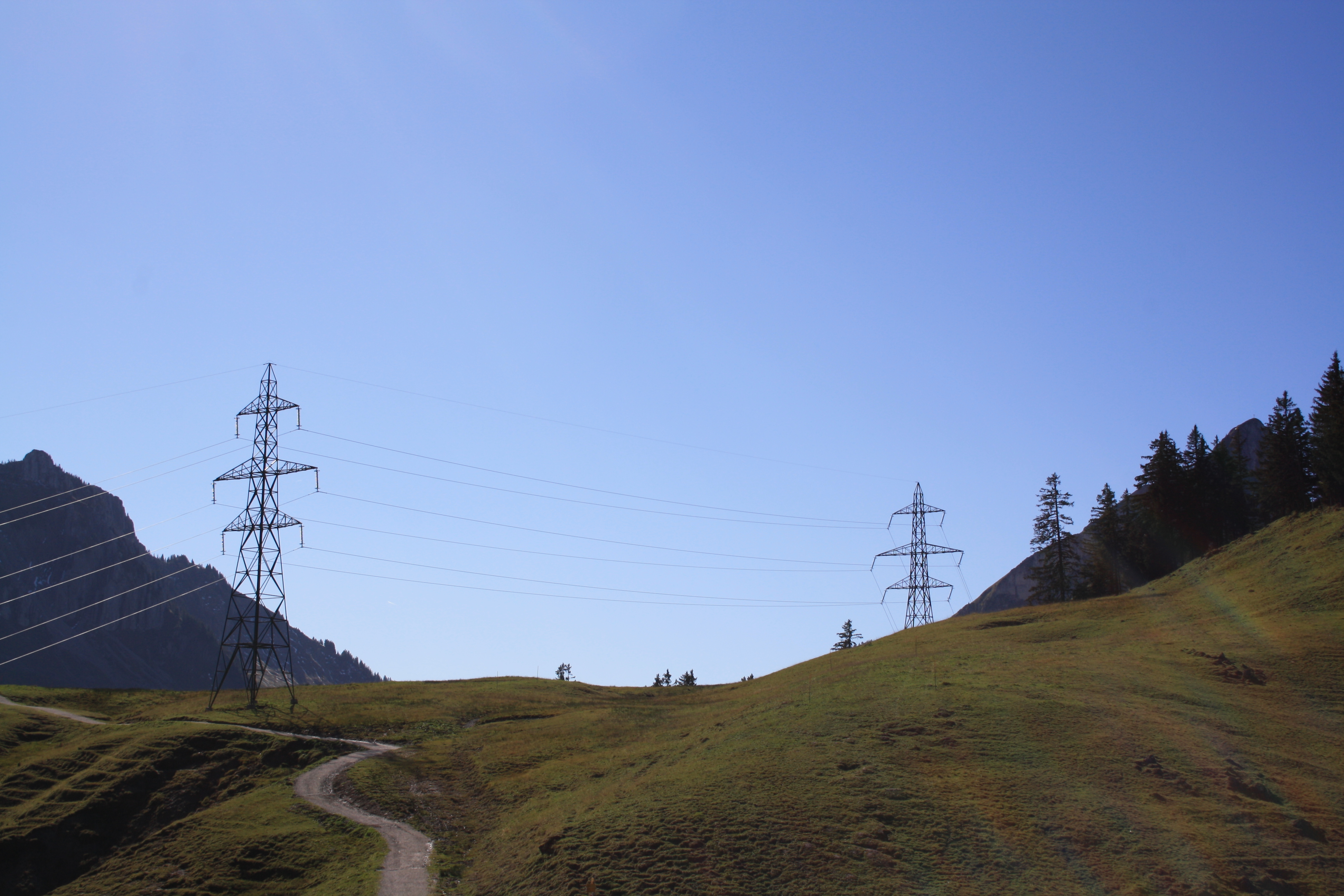
- Trail to Euschelspass (pass not visible)

- Location within Switzerland
- Elevation: 1,567 metres (5,141 ft)
- Traversed by: Trail

Third Approach
- Location: Fribourg, Switzerland
- Range: Alps
- Coordinates: 46°37′54″N 07°17′03″E

The Euschelspass (1,567 m) is a high mountain pass of the Swiss Alps, connecting Schwarzsee with Jaun in the canton of Fribourg. The pass lies on the watershed between the Jogne and the Sense and is located between the Chörblispitz and the Schafberg.

The pass is traversed by a trail.
