= Suite über 6 schweizerische Volkslieder =

Orchestral composition by Rolf Liebermann

The Suite über 6 schweizerische Volkslieder für Orchester (Suite on Six Swiss Folk Songs) is an orchestral piece by Rolf Liebermann, composed in 1944 and published in 1947. It was performed for the first time on 16 October 1949 by Leopold Stokowski with the New York Philharmonic at the Carnegie Hall, New York.

The suite was composed during the second world war. At that time patriotism was a more common element in Swiss arts. Rolf Liebermann dedicated this composition to Paul Burkhard, a Swiss composer who pioneered in incorporating Swiss themes in classical music. The light style in which the Swiss songs were arranged, show the influence of Ferruccio Busoni's "Young Classicism".

The suite consists of six parts:

1. Es isch kei sölige Stamme (Fröhlich bestimmt, Allegro) [There is no such tribe (joyously determined)]
2. Im Aargäu sind zwie Liebi (Gemächlich, Andantino) [In Aargau there are two lovers (unhurried)]
3. Schönster Abestärn (Ruhig, nicht schleppen, Andante) [Most beautiful evening star (quiet, not too slow)]
4. Durs Oberland uf und durs Oberland ab (Lustig, Allegro moderato) [The highlands up, the highlands down (joyous)]
5. S'isch äben e Mönsch uf Ärde (Langsam, Lento) [There is someone on earth (I want to be with) (slow)]
6. Üsen Ätti (Sehr frisch, Allegro vivace) [Our daddy (very fresh)]

It is orchestrated for w flutes, 2 oboes alternating with English horns, 2 clarinets in B♭, 2 bassoons, 2 French horns in F, harp. A performance lasts about 11 minutes.

== Recordings ==
- 1956 – Deutsche Grammophon 30 113 EPL, RIAS Symphonie-Orchester Berlin conducted by Ferenc Fricsay
- 1998 – Musica Helvetica MH CD 103.2, Schweizer Kammerphilharmonie conducted by Patrice Ulrich
