= Guggershorn =

Mountain in Bern, Switzerland

Guggershörnli
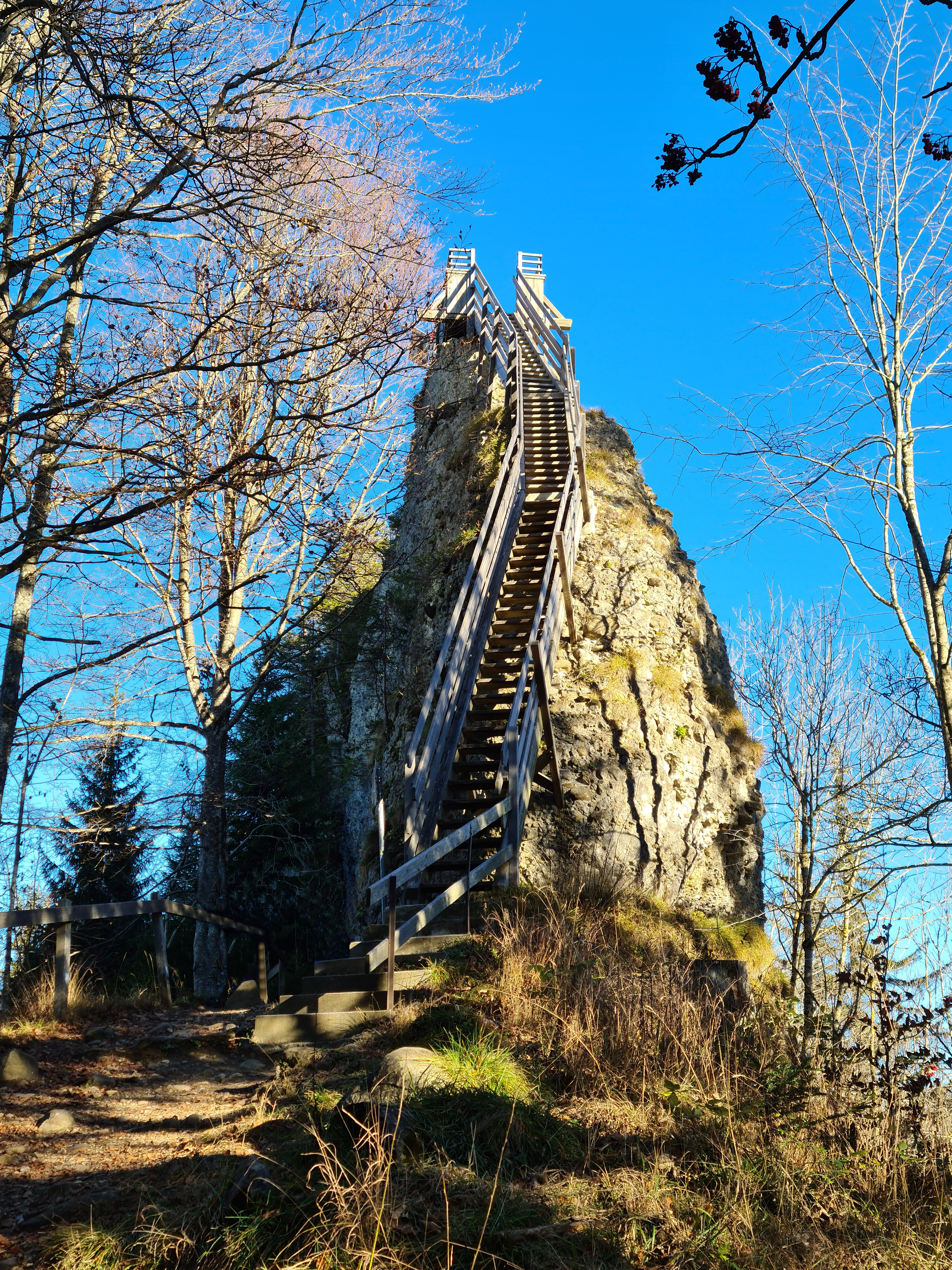

Highest point
- Elevation: 1,283 m above the sea (4,209 ft)
- Isolation: 0.55 km → Schwendelberg
- Listing: Aussichtsplattform
- Coordinates: 46°46′12″N 7°20′03″E

Geography
- Location within Switzerland
- Location: Guggisberg

Guggershorn (or Guggershörnli) is a nagelfluh mountain (1283 m a.s.l.) with a conspicuous summit rock in the Bernese Prealps, northeast above Guggisberg in Switzerland.

In 1828, the Sternenwirt Blaser built a staircase on the summit rock as a tourist attraction. The Guggershorn with its viewing platform and panorama board has been a popular excursion destination ever since.

== In culture ==
Guggershorn has become famous as the setting of the "Guggisberglied", a Swiss folk song.

== Gallery ==
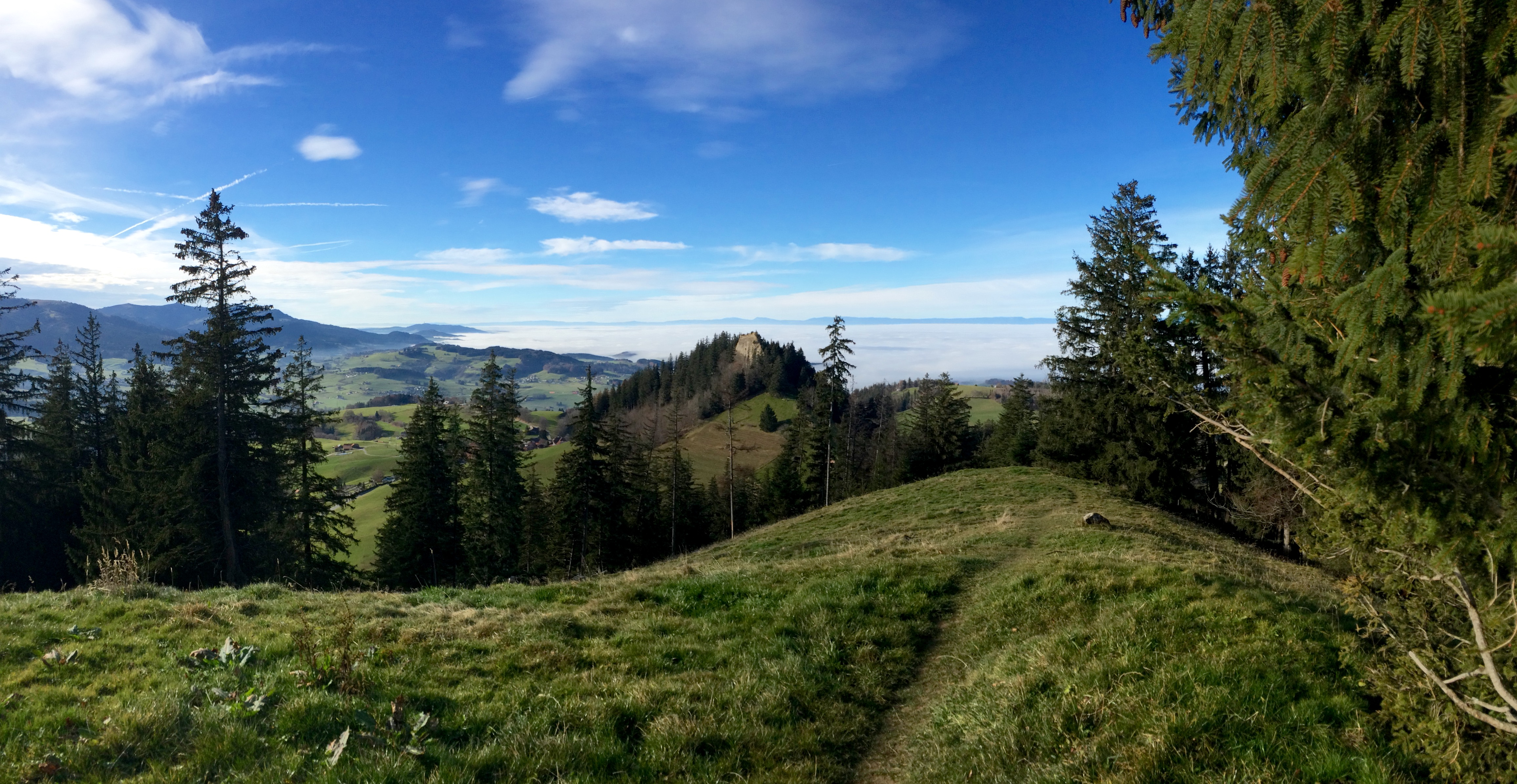
Guggershorn seen from Schwendelberg.

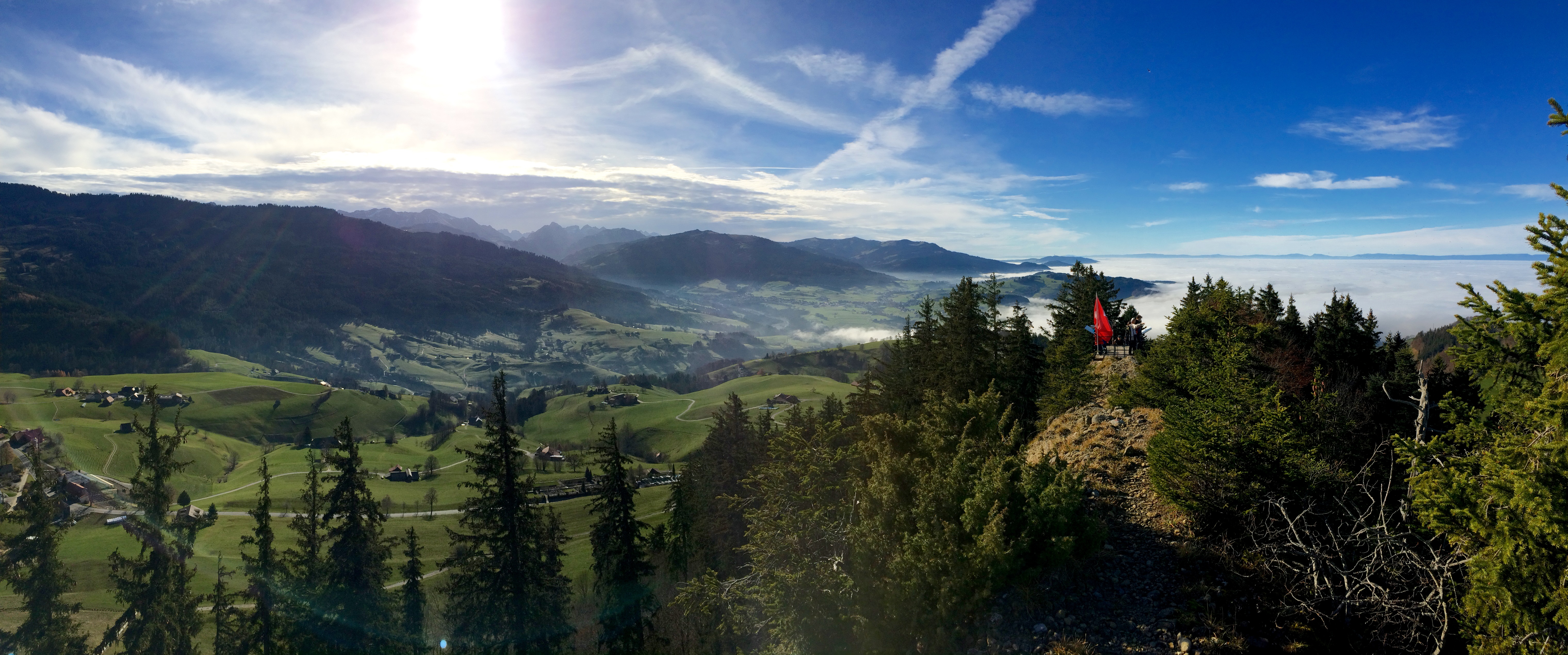
The western panorama of the Guggershorn.

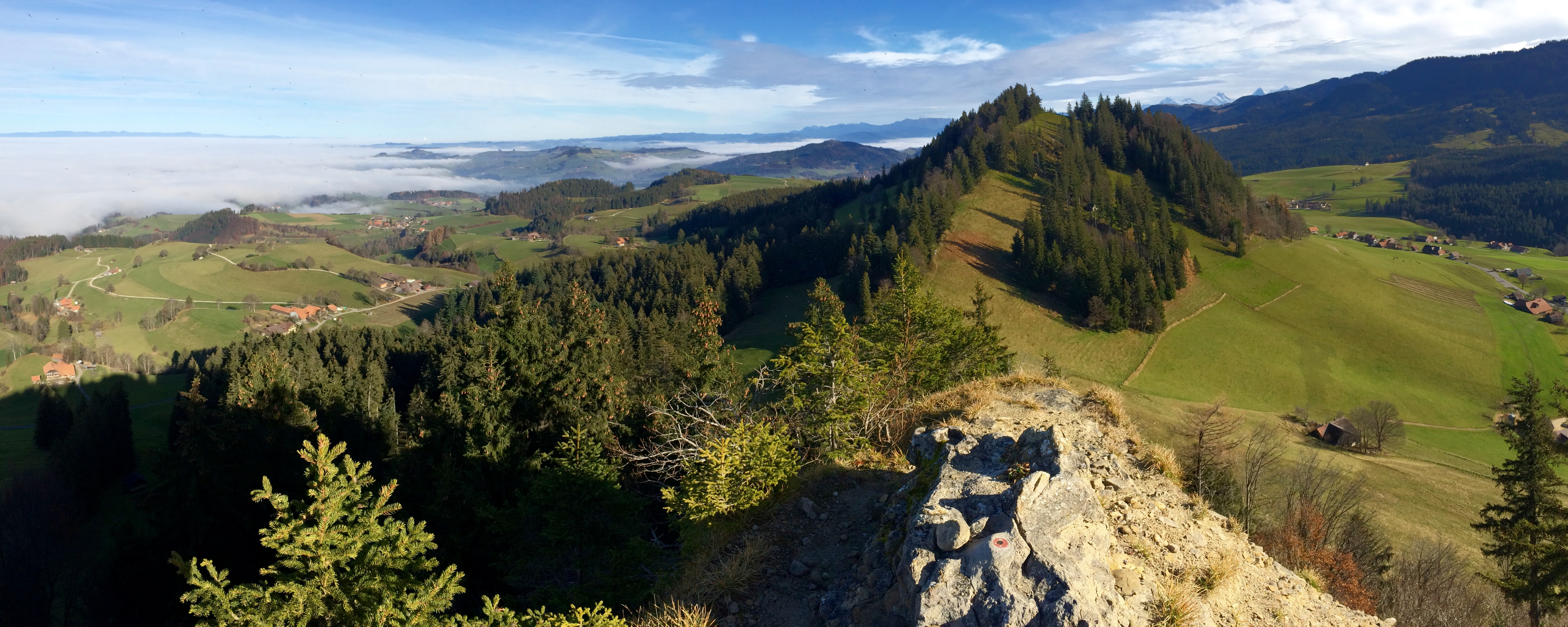
The eastern panorama of the Guggershorn with the Schwendelberg.

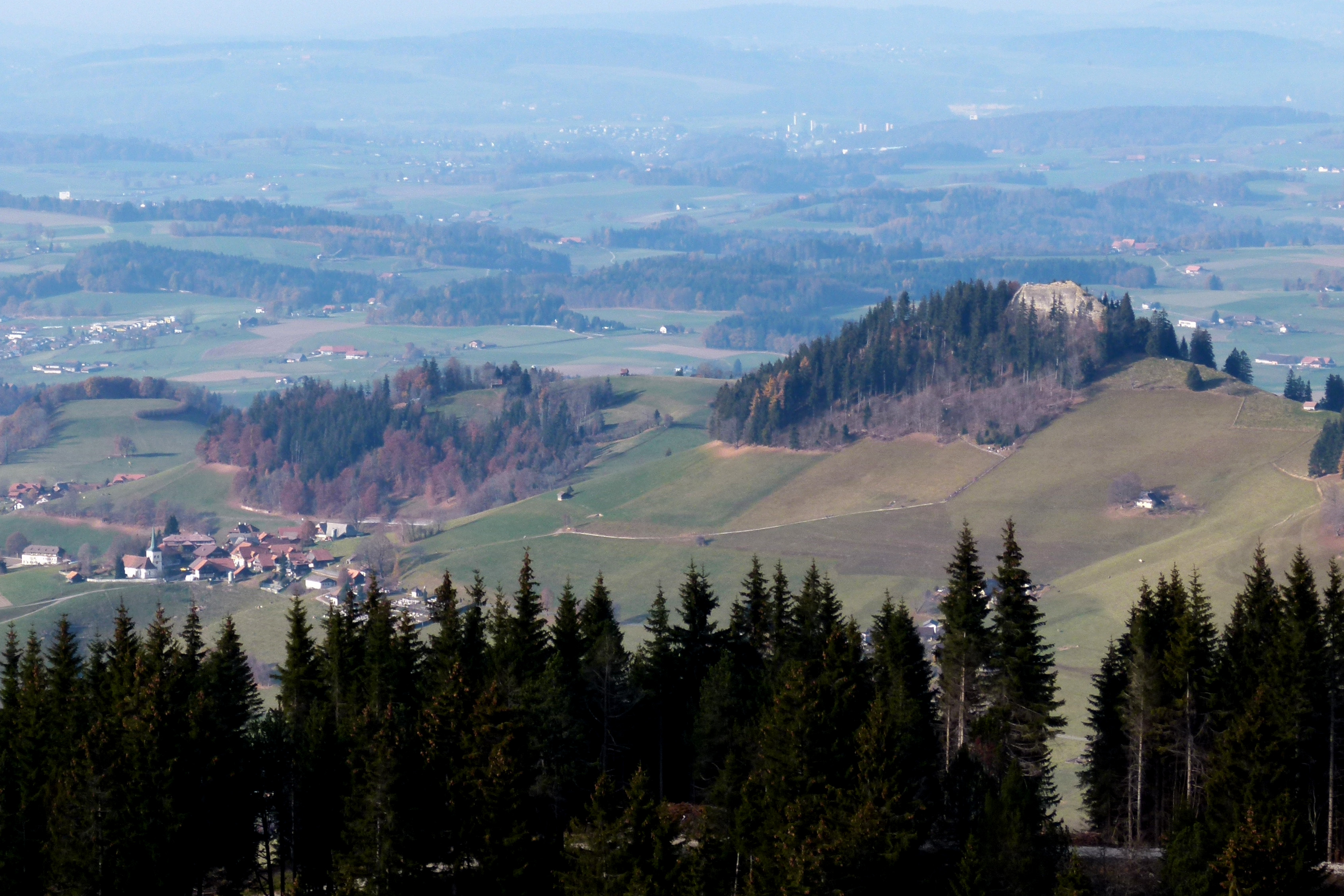
Guggershörnli and Guggisberg from the Pfyffe (in the southeast)

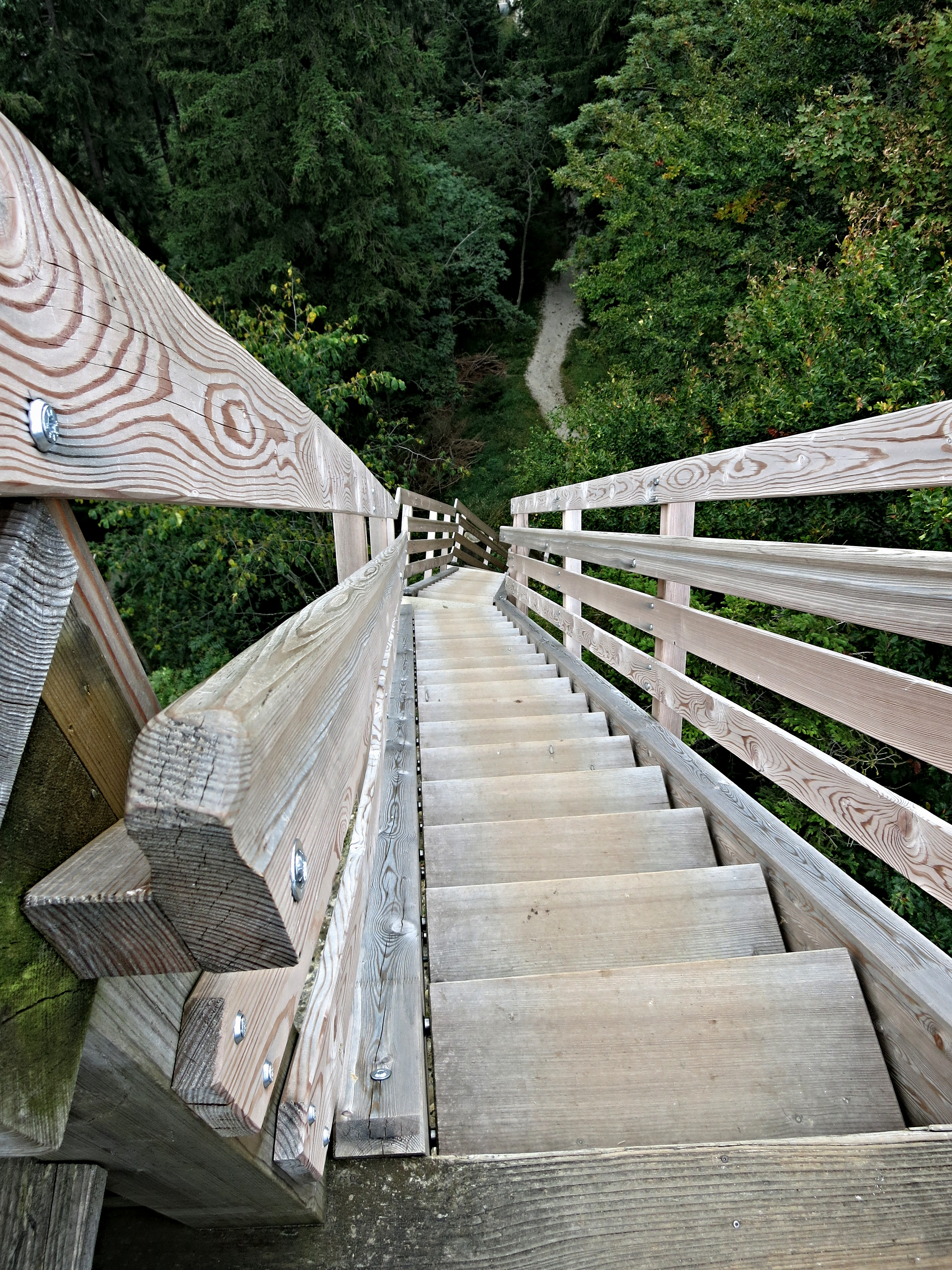
Stairs

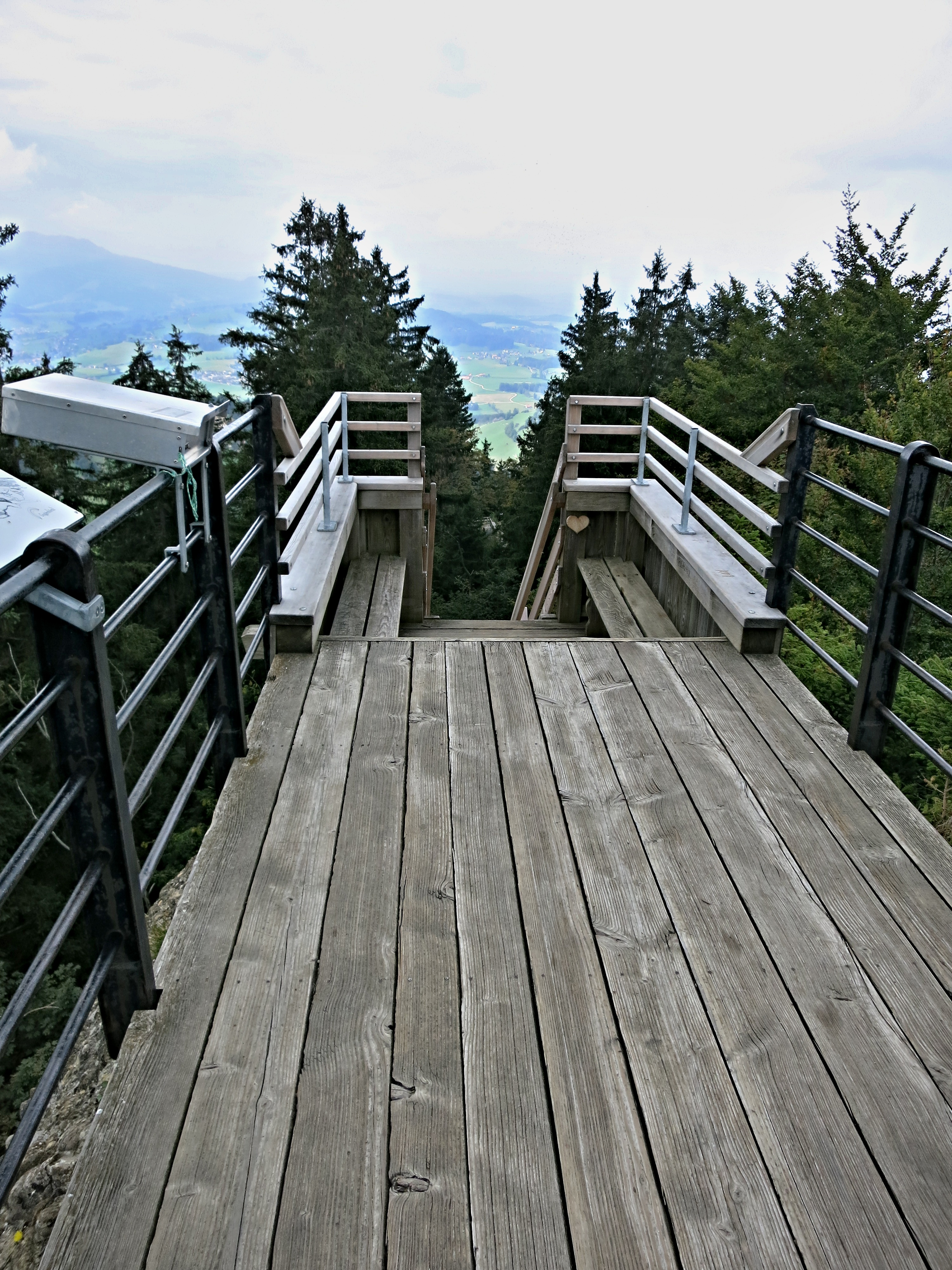
Viewing platform
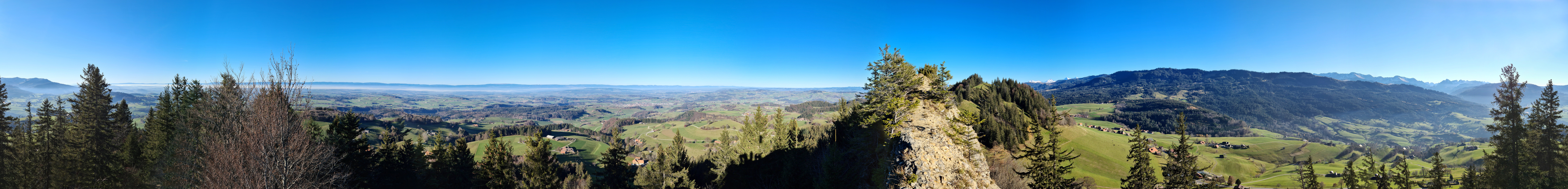
360° Panorama from Guggershörnli
