= Schopfenspitz =

Mountain in Switzerland

- Gros Brun
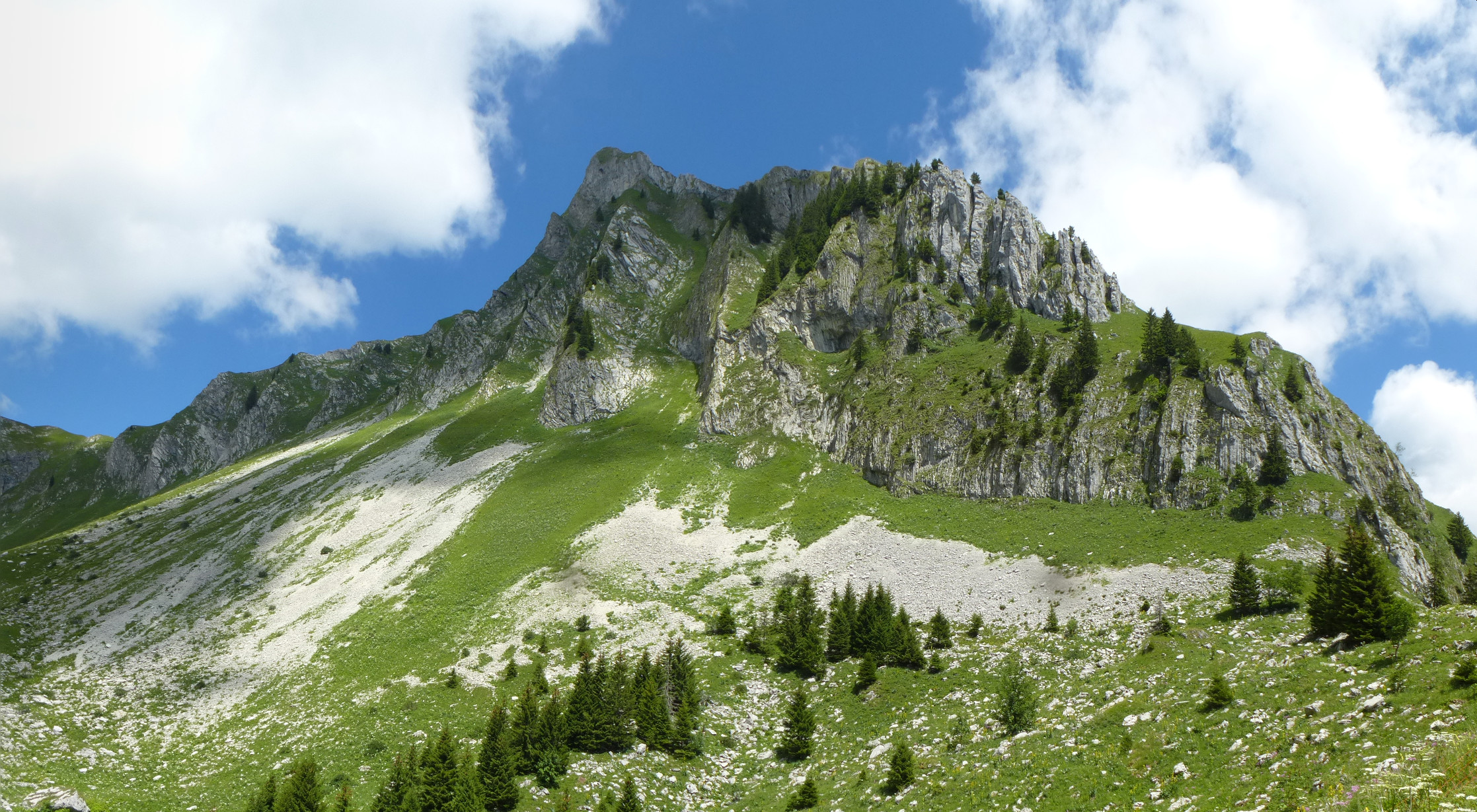
- East face of the Schopfenspitz (Gros Brun)

Highest point
- Elevation: 2,104 m (6,903 ft)
- Prominence: 537 m (1,762 ft)
- Parent peak: Schafberg
- Coordinates: 46°37′20.5″N 7°15′2″E

Geography
- Location within Switzerland
- Location: Fribourg, Switzerland
- Parent range: Bernese Alps

The Schopfenspitz (2,104 m) (also known as Gros Brun) is a mountain of the Bernese Alps, overlooking Jaun in the canton of Fribourg. It is the culminating point of the group lying between Charmey and the Euschelspass.
