= Rolf Liebermann =

Swiss composer and music administrator (1910–1999)

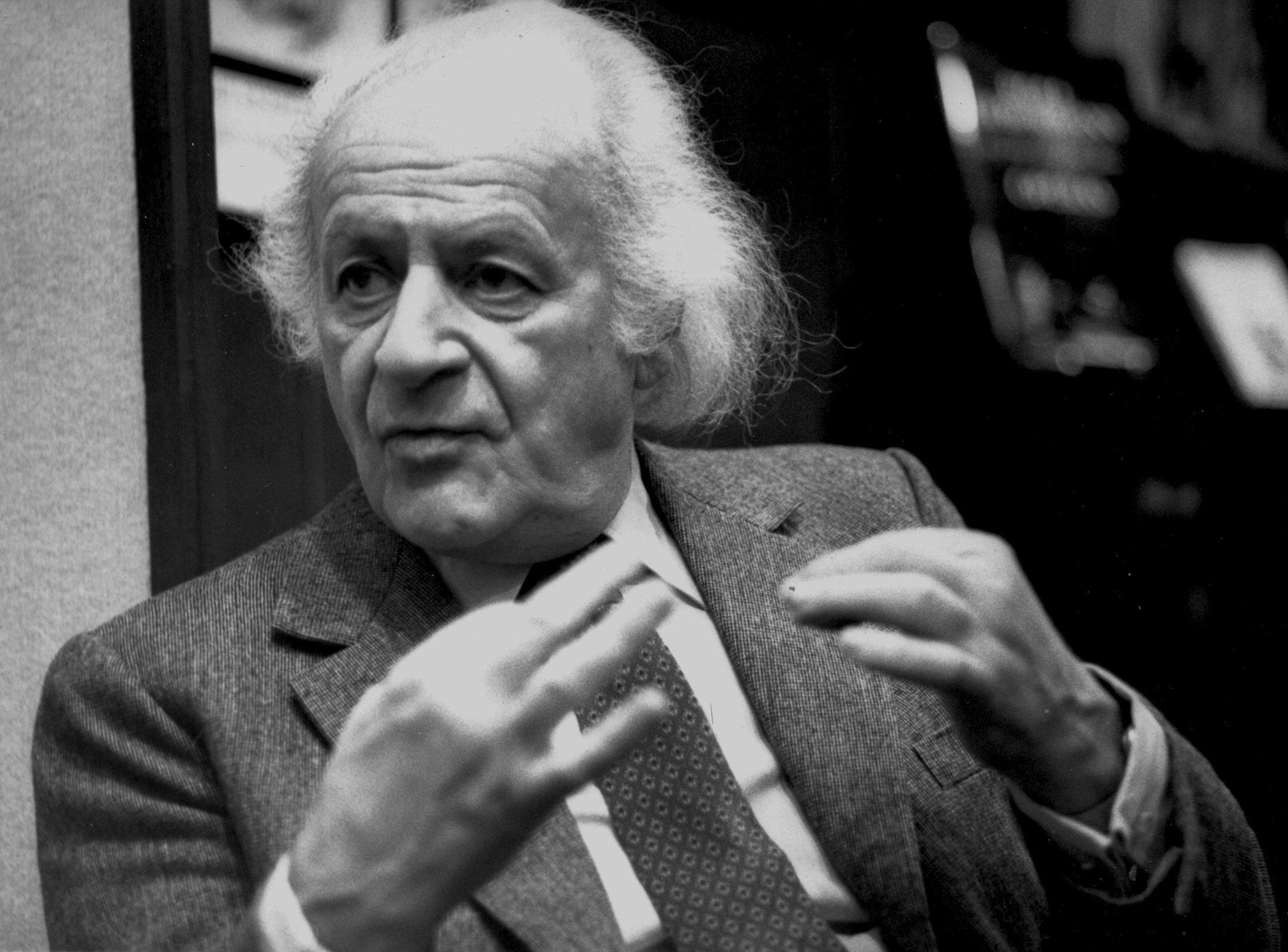
- Rolf Liebermann, by Claude Truong-Ngoc (1980)
- Born: 14 September 1910; Zürich, Switzerland
- Died: 2 January 1999 (aged 88); Paris, France
- Occupation: Composer
- Years active: 1943–1999

Rolf Liebermann (14 September 1910 – 2 January 1999), was a Swiss composer and music administrator. He served as the artistic director of the Hamburg State Opera from 1959 to 1973 and again from 1985 to 1988. He was also the artistic director of the Paris Opera from 1973 to 1980.

== Life ==
Liebermann was born in Zürich, and studied composition and conducting with Hermann Scherchen in Budapest and Vienna in the 1930s, and later with Wladimir Vogel in Basel. His compositional output involved several different musical genres, including chansons, classical, and light music. His classical music often combines myriad styles and techniques, including those drawn from baroque, classical, and twelve-tone music.

Liebermann was the director of the Hamburg Staatsoper from 1959 to 1973, and again from 1985 to 1988. During his tenure in Hamburg, he commissioned 24 new operas, including The Devils by Krzysztof Penderecki, Der Prinz von Homburg by Hans Werner Henze, and Help, Help, the Globolinks! by Gian Carlo Menotti. In the intervening years he served as director of the Paris Opera from 1973 to 1980. He died in Paris.

At the inaugural Eurovision Song Contest in 1956, Liebermann acted as the president of the jury; being responsible for moderating and finalising the results of the seven international juries judging the competition.

In 1992 he served on the jury of the Paloma O'Shea Santander International Piano Competition in Spain.

In 1989, he was the head of the jury at the 39th Berlin International Film Festival.

== Works ==
- 1943 Polyphone Studien for chamber orchestra
- 1944 Une des fins du monde, cantata for baritone and orchestra after Jean Giraudoux
- 1945 Chinese Love Songs
- 1945 Furioso für Orchester
- 1947 Swiss Folk Song Suite (Suite über 6 schweizerische Volkslieder)
- 1949 Music for Orchestra and Reciter; Chinese Song; Symphony No 1
- 1950 Streitlied zwischen Leben und Tod (Combat Song of Life and Death)
- 1951 Sonata for piano
- 1952 Leonore 40/45 (opera). First performance: Basel
- 1954 Penelope (opera). First performance: Salzburg Festival (George Szell/Schuh/Neher/Anneliese Rothenberger/Walter Berry/Peter Klein (tenor)/Rudolf Schock/Max Lorenz (tenor)/Kurt Böhme/Kurt Equiluz)
- 1954 Concerto for Jazzband and Symphony Orchestra. First performance: Donau Festival Hall, Donaueschingen, cond. Hans Rosbaud with the Southwest Radio Orchestra of Baden-Baden and Kurt Edelhagen's Jazz Orchestra, 17 October 1954; American première: the Sauter-Finegan Orchestra with the Chicago Symphony Orchestra, cond. Fritz Reiner, November 1954 (also recorded for RCA at that time)
- 1955 The School for Wives (opera). First performance of the one-act version: Louisville, Kentucky
- 1956 Executive supervisor for the Eurovision Song Contest 1956
- 1957 Die Schule der Frauen (opera). European premiere: Salzburg Festival (Szell/Schuh/Neher/Walter Berry/Kurt Böhme/Anneliese Rothenberger/Nicolai Gedda/Christa Ludwig)
- 1958 Geigy Festival Concerto for Basler drum and orchestra
- 1959 Capriccio for soprano, violin and orchestra
- 1964 Concert des Echanges, Swiss National Exhibition, Lausanne
- 1981 Essai 81 for cello and piano
- 1984 Ferdinand, parable for speaker and instruments
- 1987 La Forêt (opera). First performance: Geneva (Tate/Deflo/Orlandi)
- 1988 Herring Quintet; Cosmopolitan Greetings (Gruntz/Wilson/Ginsberg)
- 1989 Medea Monologue for soprano, female choir and orchestra
- 1990 3x1 = CH+X for mezzo-soprano, choir, and orchestra
- 1992 Freispruch für Medea (opera). First performance: Hamburg 1995
- 1994 Enigma; Violin Concerto
- 1995 Piano Concerto
- 1996 Die schlesischen Weber (text: Heinrich Heine) for mixed choir, string quartet, and piano
- 1997 Variations on a Theme from Appenzell for five instruments
- 1998 Mouvance for nine percussion players and piano
