= Guggisberglied =

Swiss folk song

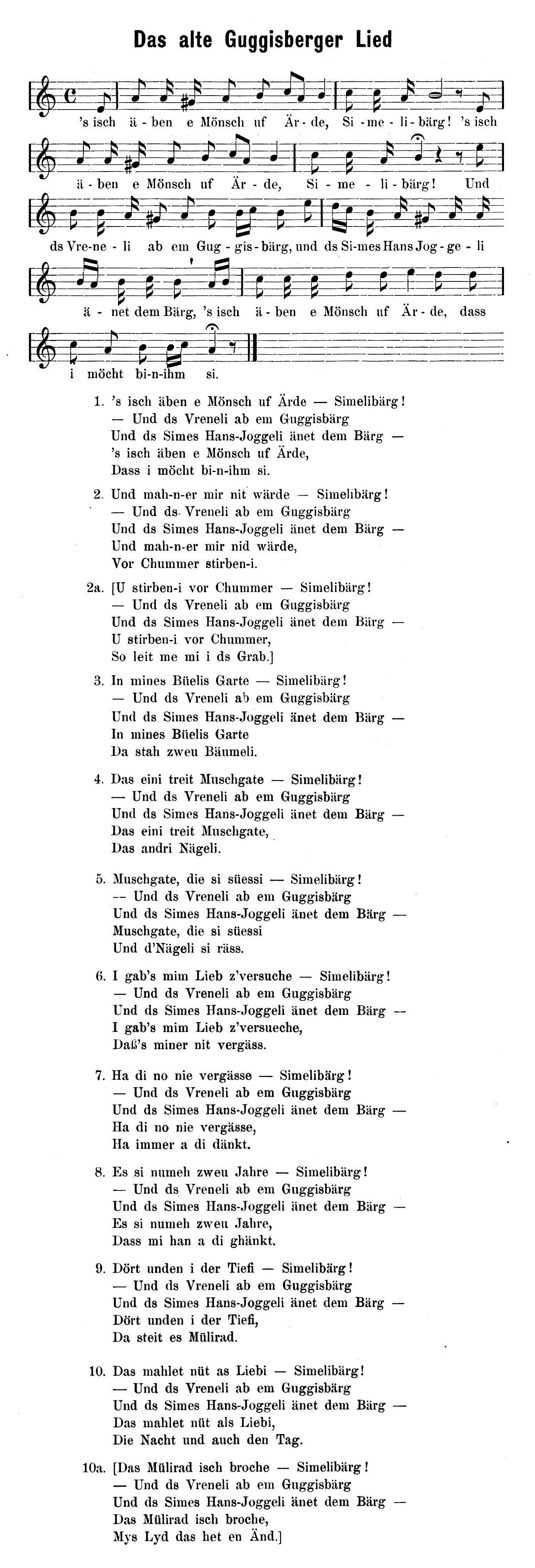

Song
- Language: Swiss German
- Published: not later than 1764
- Genre: Folk
- Songwriter: Traditional

"Vreneli ab em Guggisberg", more simply known as "Altes Guggisbergerlied" or "Guggisberglied", is a Swiss folk song. It was first recorded in 1741, and the oldest surviving version of the lyrics dates to 1764. It is about a woman from Guggisberg named Vreneli who is longing for her love Simes Hans-Joggeli and finds comfort in the image of the endlessly turning mill wheel. The history of the song is preserved at the Vreneli Museum.
