= Belpberg (ridge) =

Ridge in the Aare valley, Switzerland

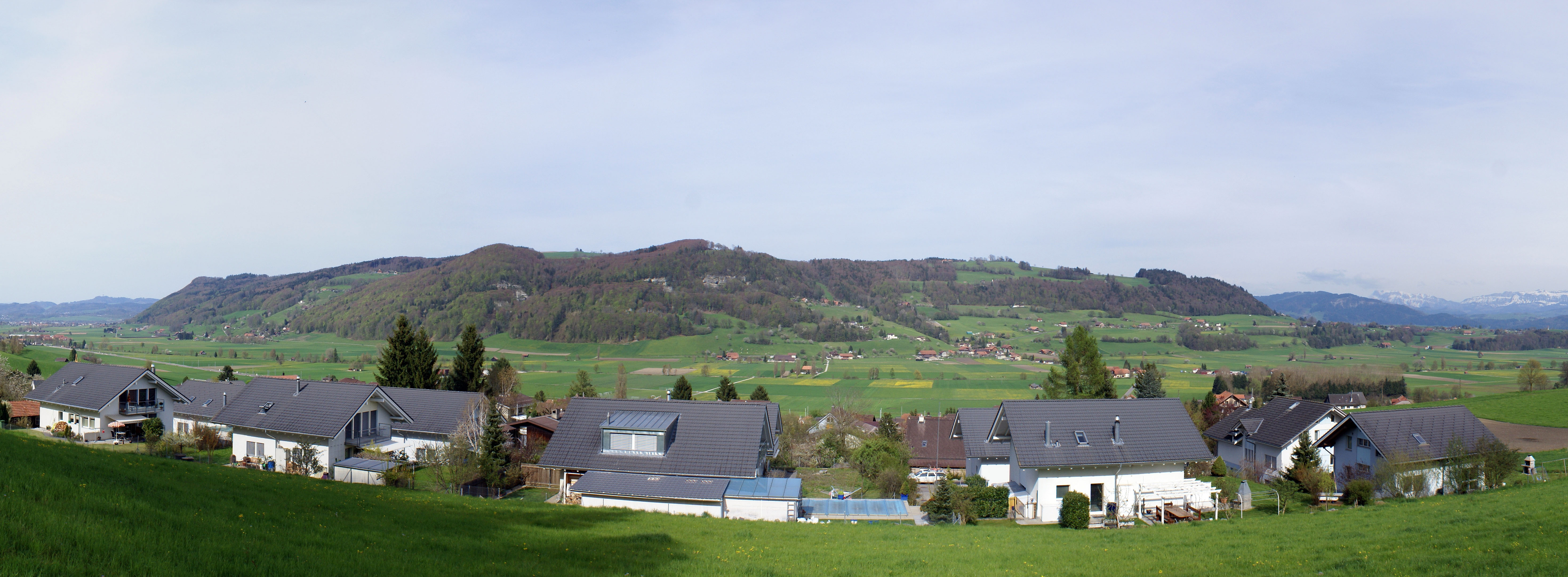
- Der Belpberg

Highest point
- Elevation: 892.5 m above the sea (2,928 ft)
- Prominence: 893−596 m ↓ Seftigen
- Isolation: 3.85 km → Längenberg
- Coordinates: 46°51′38″N 7°31′35″E

Geography
- Location within Switzerland
- Location: Kanton Bern, Schweiz

Geology
- Rock type: Molassesandstein und Nagelfluh

To the right of the Aare, Belpberg, taken by Walter Mittelholzer from 2000 m (1934)

Belpberg is an isolated ridge in the Aaretal between Bern and Thun in Switzerland. The ridge has a width of 2 to 4 km and a length of about 11 km, reaches its highest point on the Chutzen at 892.5 m above sea level and rises up to 370 meters from the surrounding valley plains. Belpberg is bordered on the west by the Gürbetal, on the east by the wide Aaretal and on the north by the Belpmoos, the place where the Gürbetal merges with Aaretal. The southern boundary is formed by a valley furrow near Seftigen. Until 2011, it was in the municipality of Belpberg, which later was merged with Belp.

== History ==
The Belpberg was settled comparatively early, before the year 1000, because the surrounding valley plains were often hit by floods.

On the Chutzen, as well as on the Gurten and the Bantiger, there has been an important watchtower in old Bern since the early modern period.

== Geology ==
Belpberg consists of molasse sandstone and nagelfluh. During the ice ages, the ridge was always completely covered by the ice of the Aargletschers. The geomorphology of the mountain is therefore glacially overprinted. On the ridge and on the slopes, ground moraine material and lateral moraines, respectively, were deposited during the various retreat stages of the glacier.

== Geography ==
The northern part of the ridge is formed as an undulating plateau, which lies on average at 800 m above sea level. On three sides, this plateau drops steeply towards the surrounding countryside. The slopes are mostly densely forested and show sandstone cliffs in some places. Towards the south, in the area of the municipality of Gerzensee, the ridge changes into a much lower plateau (600 to 650 m a.s.l.), on which Lake Gerzen with its belt of reeds and bushes is also located. This southern part has steep slopes only towards the Gürbetal, while the ridge gently dips towards the east.

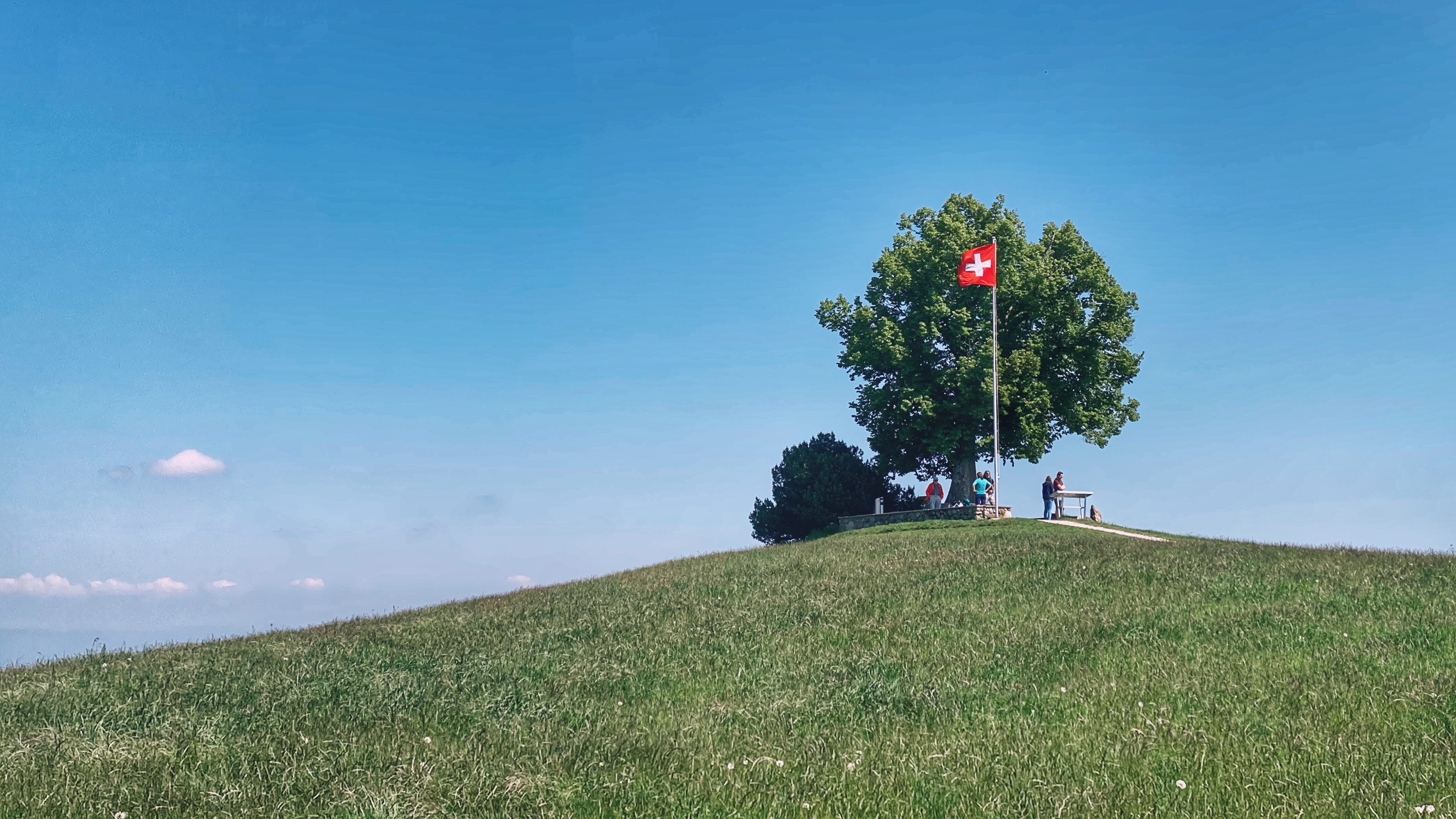
The peak of the Belpberg, called Belpberg Chutze

== Use ==
Belpberg is mainly used for agriculture. There are extensive meadows and pastures and arable land as well as numerous fruit trees. The farmers are mainly engaged in dairy farming and cattle breeding, and on the fertile soils also in arable farming. Ridge has a scattered settlement area (municipality of Belpberg) with widely scattered hamlets, farm groups and individual farms. On the southern part of the Belpberg there are the villages of Gerzensee and Kirchdorf as well as the settlements of Mühledorf, Gelterfingen, Noflen and Kienersrüti.

Belpberg is a popular recreation area for Bern and the larger villages of the Aare and Gürbetal valleys. From the ridge there is a good view of the Bernese Alps.

== Sites ==
On the Chutzen, hidden behind a bush, is a memorial stone to John F. Kennedy and the desire for freedom.

In memory of the 1956 Hungarian Uprising, a monument was placed five years after.
