= Vreneli Museum =

Museum in Guggisberg, Switzerland

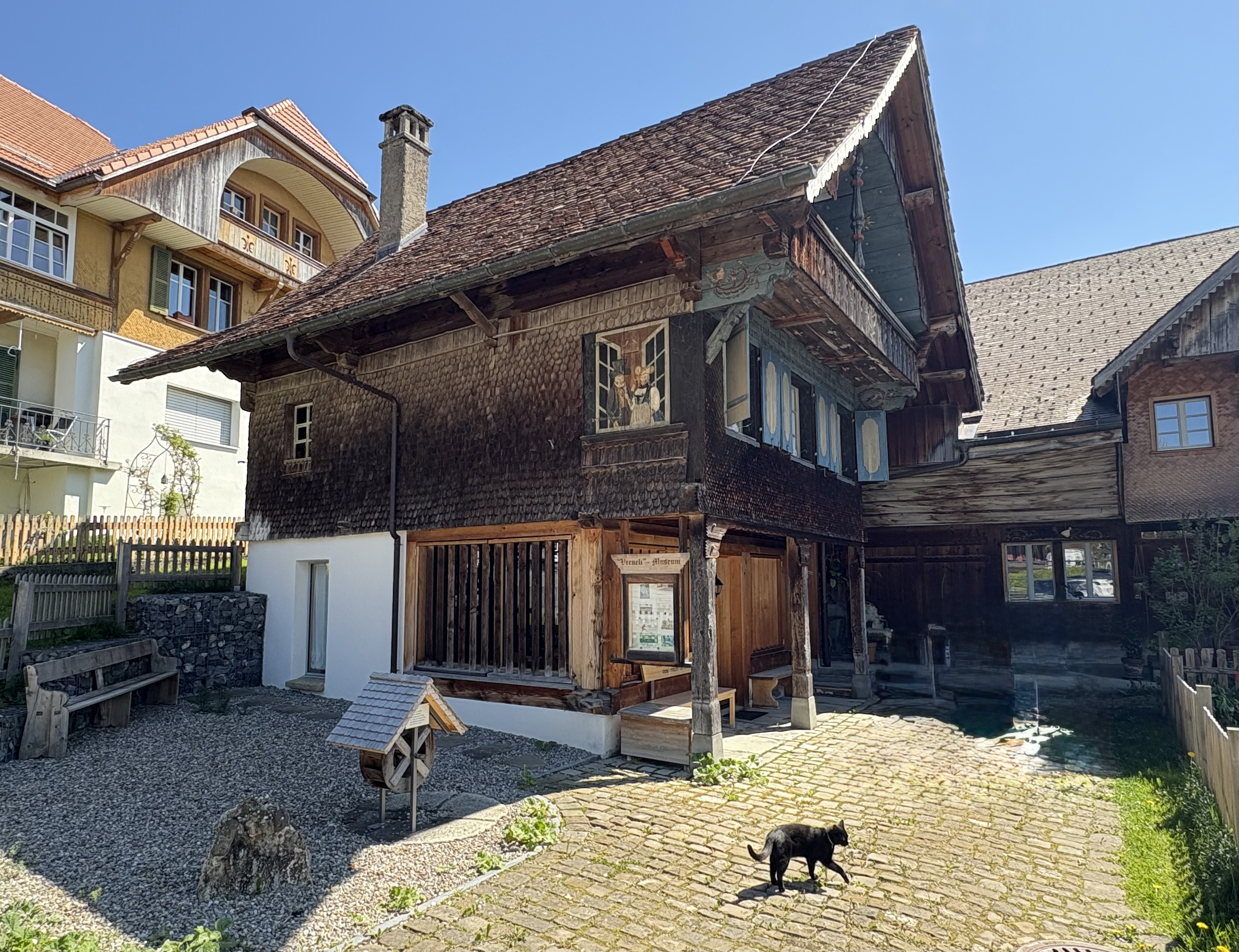
- The museum in 2025
- Established: 1995
- Location: Guggisberg, Bern, Switzerland
- Coordinates: 46°46′01″N 7°19′46″E
- Type: history museum
- Website: vreneli-museum.ch

The Vreneli Museum is a history museum in Guggisberg, Switzerland. The museum focuses on the story of the woman Verena ("Vreneli") from the Swiss folk song "Vreneli ab em Guggisberg". The museum's collection includes original Guggisberg traditional costumes, Swiss antiques, and historic accounts of Guggisberg.
