= Guggisberg =

- Municipality
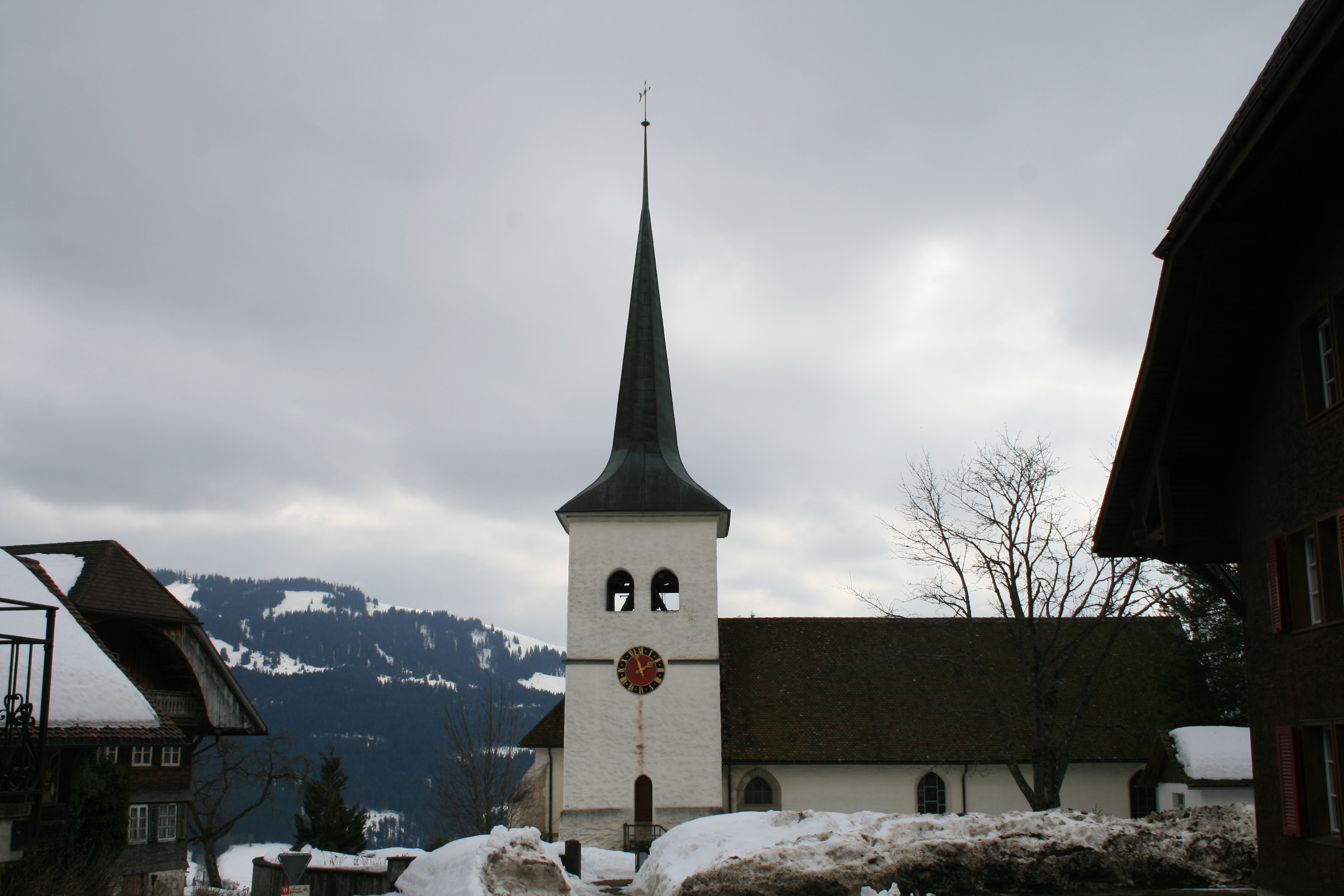

- Flag Coat of arms
- Location of Guggisberg
- Location within Switzerland Location within Canton of Bern
- Coordinates: 46°46′N 7°20′E
- Country: Switzerland
- Canton: Bern
- District: Bern-Mittelland

Government
  - Executive: Gemeinderat with 7 members
  - Mayor: Gemeindepräsident; Niklaus Köpplin (as of 2026)

Area
  - Total: 54.9 km^{2} (21.2 sq mi)
- Elevation: 1,115 m (3,658 ft)

Population (December 2020)
  - Total: 1,490
  - Density: 27.1/km^{2} (70.3/sq mi)
- Time zone: UTC+01:00 (CET)
  - Summer (DST): UTC+02:00 (CEST)
- Postal code: 3158
- SFOS number: 852
- ISO 3166 code: CH-BE
- Surrounded by: Alterswil (FR), Oberwil im Simmental, Plaffeien (FR), Rüschegg, Schwarzenburg
- Website: https://www.guggisberg-be.ch/

Guggisberg (Bernese German Guggishbärg [ˈgʊkisbærg]) is a municipality in the Bern-Mittelland administrative district in the Swiss canton of Bern.

== History ==
Guggisberg is first mentioned in 1076 as Mons Guchani. The next earliest reference to the community dates from 1148, when Guggisberg (spelled Cucansperc) was mentioned in a document of Pope Eugene III. In 1423 the territory was divided in two and sold by Amadeus VII, Count of Savoy to Bern and Fribourg. It would remain as two separate entitites until reunified by Napoleon's Act of Mediation in 1803.

In the early 19th century the village of Guggisberg was known as destination for tourists due to the view of the Guggershorn and other surrounding mountains. However, in 1819 the canton began moving many landless poor (Allmendsiedler literally: Common land settler) into the municipality. The large, poor population and famines in 1816-1818 and the 1840s overwhelmed the community. Many farmers had to sell their grazing rights (Alprechte) while others moved to America to escape the poverty. By 1850 Guggisberg was the poorest municipality in Canton Bern. To try to stabilize the economy, in 1860 the municipality was split into two, Guggisberg and Rüschegg.

== Geography ==
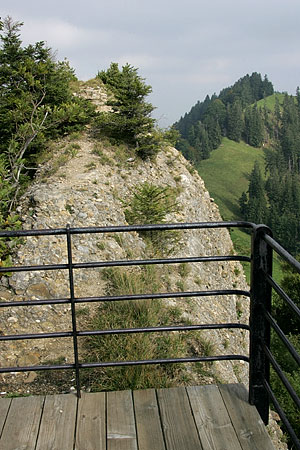
Guggishörnli

Guggisberg has an area of 54.91 km^{2} (21.20 sq mi). As of 2012, a total of 28.83 km^{2} (11.13 mi^{2}) or 52.5% is used for agricultural purposes, while 21.68 km^{2} (8.37 mi^{2}) or 39.5% is forested. The rest of the municipality is 1.64 km^{2} (0.63 mi^{2}) or 3.0% is settled (buildings or roads), 0.9 km^{2} (0.35 mi^{2}) or 1.6% is either rivers or lakes and 1.82 km^{2} (0.70 mi^{2}) or 3.3% is unproductive land.

During the same year, housing and buildings made up 1.6% and transportation infrastructure made up 1.3%. A total of 35.4% of the total land area is heavily forested and 4.1% is covered with orchards or small clusters of trees. Of the agricultural land, 2.0% is used for growing crops and 31.0% is pasturage and 19.1% is used for alpine pastures. All the water in the municipality is flowing water. Of the unproductive areas, 1.9% is unproductive vegetation and 1.5% is too rocky for vegetation.

It lies approximately midway between Fribourg and Thun.

The municipality is located in the Swiss Plateau alpine foothills. It stretches from the Sense River (the border with the Canton of Fribourg) to the hill country around the Stockhorn mountain chain. In the south the municipality rises into the mountains and includes an alpine and forestry zone as well as the hamlet of Sangernboden. The northern part of the municipality is flatter and features fields, villages, hamlets and individual farm houses (including Riffenmatt, Kalchstätten, Riedstätt, Kriesbaumen, Laubbach) at an elevation of 860–1,120 meters (2,820–3,670 ft).

On 31 December 2009 Amtsbezirk Schwarzenburg, the municipality's former district, was dissolved. On the following day, 1 January 2010, it joined the newly created Verwaltungskreis Bern-Mittelland.

== Demographics ==
Guggisberg has a population (as of December 2020) of 1,490. As of 2011, 2.5% of the population are resident foreign nationals. Over the last year (2010-2011) the population has changed at a rate of -1.6%. Migration accounted for -1.5%, while births and deaths accounted for -0.3%.

Most of the population (as of 2000) speaks German (1,628 or 98.1%) as their first language, English is the second most common (6 or 0.4%) and French is the third (5 or 0.3%). There is 1 person who speaks Italian.

As of 2008, the population was 50.2% male and 49.8% female. The population was made up of 758 Swiss men (48.5% of the population) and 26 (1.7%) non-Swiss men. There were 765 Swiss women (48.9%) and 14 (0.9%) non-Swiss women. Of the population in the municipality, 901 or about 54.3% were born in Guggisberg and lived there in 2000. There were 456 or 27.5% who were born in the same canton, while 143 or 8.6% were born somewhere else in Switzerland, and 61 or 3.7% were born outside of Switzerland.

As of 2011, children and teenagers (0–19 years old) make up 21.6% of the population, while adults (20–64 years old) make up 57.5% and seniors (over 64 years old) make up 20.9%.

As of 2000, there were 734 people who were single and never married in the municipality. There were 771 married individuals, 110 widows or widowers and 45 individuals who are divorced.

As of 2010, there were 165 households that consist of only one person and 71 households with five or more people. In 2000, a total of 587 apartments (72.0% of the total) were permanently occupied, while 177 apartments (21.7%) were seasonally occupied and 51 apartments (6.3%) were empty. The vacancy rate for the municipality, in 2010, was 0.46%. In 2011, single family homes made up 34.0% of the total housing in the municipality.

The historical population is given in the following chart:

== Politics ==
In the 2011 federal election the most popular party was the Swiss People's Party (SVP) which received 53.3% of the vote. The next three most popular parties were the Conservative Democratic Party (BDP) (14.4%), the Social Democratic Party (SP) (8.3%) and the Green Party (5.4%). In the federal election, a total of 619 votes were cast, and the voter turnout was 46.4%.

== Economy ==
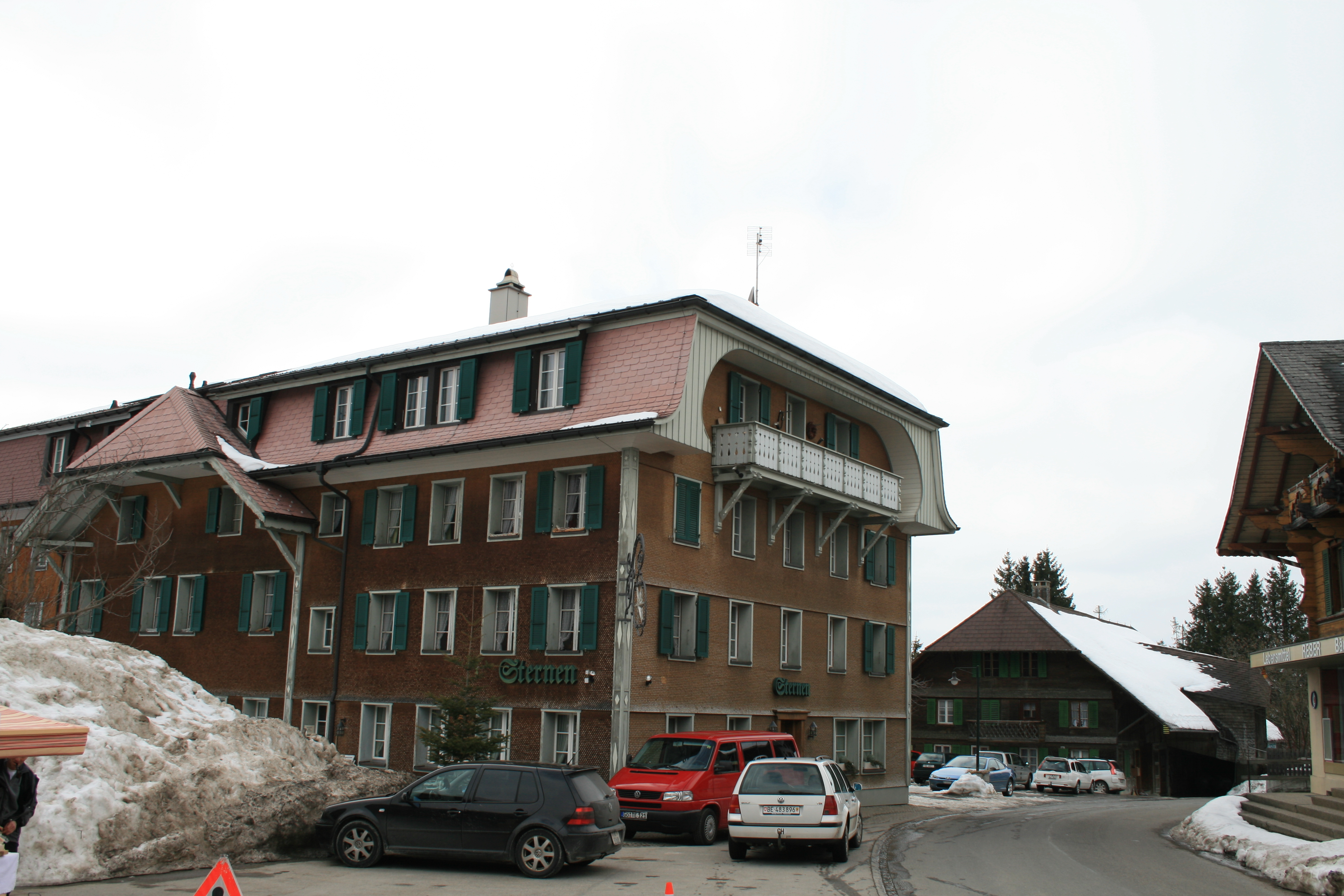
Sternen Restaurant in Guggisberg

As of 2011, Guggisberg had an unemployment rate of 1.25%. As of 2008, there were a total of 627 people employed in the municipality. Of these, there were 395 people employed in the primary economic sector and about 138 businesses involved in this sector. 46 people were employed in the secondary sector and there were 16 businesses in this sector. 186 people were employed in the tertiary sector, with 35 businesses in this sector. There were 797 residents of the municipality who were employed in some capacity, of which females made up 38.1% of the workforce.

In 2008 there were a total of 429 full-time equivalent jobs. The number of jobs in the primary sector was 261, of which 220 were in agriculture and 42 were in forestry or lumber production. The number of jobs in the secondary sector was 40 of which 31 or (77.5%) were in manufacturing and 10 (25.0%) were in construction. The number of jobs in the tertiary sector was 128. In the tertiary sector; 13 or 10.2% were in wholesale or retail sales or the repair of motor vehicles, 16 or 12.5% were in the movement and storage of goods, 36 or 28.1% were in a hotel or restaurant, 2 or 1.6% were technical professionals or scientists, 19 or 14.8% were in education and 32 or 25.0% were in health care.

In 2000, there were 61 workers who commuted into the municipality and 385 workers who commuted away. The municipality is a net exporter of workers, with about 6.3 workers leaving the municipality for every one entering. A total of 412 workers (87.1% of the 473 total workers in the municipality) both lived and worked in Guggisberg. Of the working population, 9.7% used public transportation to get to work, and 48.7% used a private car.

In 2011 the average local and cantonal tax rate on a married resident, with two children, of Guggisberg making 150,000 CHF was 13.4%, while an unmarried resident's rate was 19.6%. For comparison, the average rate for the entire canton in the same year, was 14.2% and 22.0%, while the nationwide average was 12.3% and 21.1% respectively.

In 2009 there were a total of 570 tax payers in the municipality. Of that total, 96 made over 75,000 CHF per year. There were 13 people who made between 15,000 and 20,000 per year. The greatest number of workers, 164, made between 50,000 and 75,000 CHF per year. The average income of the over 75,000 CHF group in Guggisberg was 94,890 CHF, while the average across all of Switzerland was 130,478 CHF.

In 2011 a total of 2.3% of the population received direct financial assistance from the government.

== Religion ==
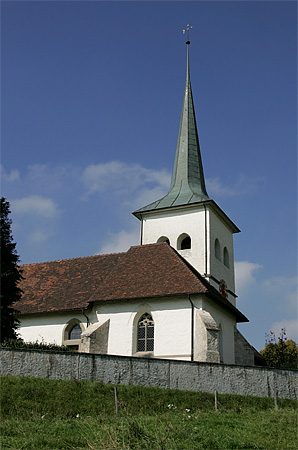
Guggisberg Swiss Reformed church

From the 2000 census, 1,315 or 79.2% belonged to the Swiss Reformed Church, while 77 or 4.6% were Roman Catholic. Of the rest of the population, there was 1 member of an Orthodox church, there was 1 individual who belongs to the Christian Catholic Church, and there were 54 individuals (or about 3.25% of the population) who belonged to another Christian church. There were 10 (or about 0.60% of the population) who were Muslim. There were 1 individual who belonged to another church. 86 (or about 5.18% of the population) belonged to no church, are agnostic or atheist, and 115 individuals (or about 6.93% of the population) did not answer the question.

== Education ==
In Guggisberg about 49.3% of the population have completed non-mandatory upper secondary education, and 9.5% have completed additional higher education (either university or a Fachhochschule). Of the 87 who had completed some form of tertiary schooling listed in the census, 65.5% were Swiss men, 25.3% were Swiss women, 5.7% were non-Swiss men.

The Canton of Bern school system provides one year of non-obligatory Kindergarten, followed by six years of Primary school. This is followed by three years of obligatory lower Secondary school where the students are separated according to ability and aptitude. Following the lower Secondary students may attend additional schooling or they may enter an apprenticeship.

During the 2011-12 school year, there were a total of 132 students attending classes in Guggisberg. There was one kindergarten class with a total of 19 students in the municipality. The municipality had 6 primary classes and 87 students. Of the primary students, 3.4% were permanent or temporary residents of Switzerland (not citizens) and 1.1% have a different mother language than the classroom language. During the same year, there were 2 lower secondary classes with a total of 26 students.

As of 2000, there were a total of 209 students attending any school in the municipality. Of those, 202 both lived and attended school in the municipality, while 7 students came from another municipality. During the same year, 80 residents attended schools outside the municipality.

== Famous persons with the surname Guggisberg ==
- de:Adrian Guggisberg (1943), Swiss politician
- de:Charles Albert Walter Guggisberg (1913-1980), Swiss zoologist, scholar and author
- Lady Decima Moore-Guggisberg (1871-1964), British actress
- de:Franz Guggisberg (1926-2001), public official, chancellor of Canton Basel-Landschaft
- Sir Frederick Gordon Guggisberg (1869-1930), - British Brigadier-General, colonial governor of the Gold Coast and British Guyana, author
- de:Gunvor Guggisberg (1974), Swiss entertainer
- de:Hans Guggisberg (1880-1977), Swiss gynecologist, scholar and author, dean of the medical faculty of the University of Bern, Switzerland
- de:Hans Rudolf Guggisberg (1930-1996), Swiss historian, scholar and author, dean of the history faculty of Basel University, Switzerland
- de:Kurt Guggisberg (1907-1972), Swiss theologian, church historian, scholar and author, dean of the theology faculty of the University of Bern, Switzerland
- de:Martin Guggisberg (1960), Swiss archeologist
- de:Peter Guggisberg (1985), Swiss hockey player
- de:Ulrich Guggisberg (1947), Swiss soccer player

== Coat of arms ==
The blazon of the municipal coat of arms is Argent a Girl in local Costume proper statant on a Mount of 2 Coupeaux Vert holding in dexter a Rose Gules barbed and seeded proper and slipped and leaved Vert.

== Heritage sites of national significance ==
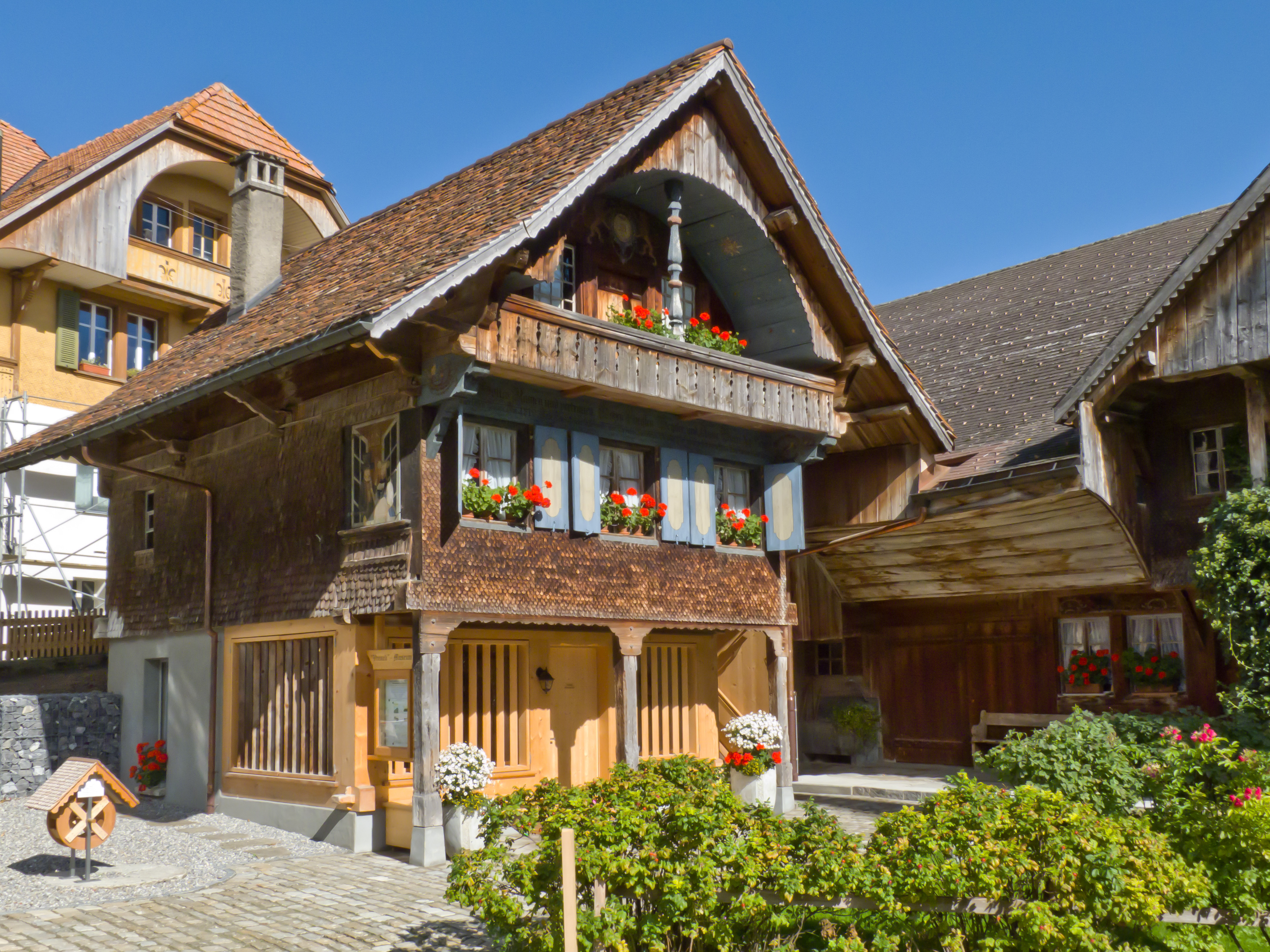
The Vreneli Museum in the Trifelers Babis Stöckli house

The Trifelers Babis Stöckli house at Dorf 74 is listed as a Swiss heritage site of national significance. The entire village of Guggisberg is part of the Inventory of Swiss Heritage Sites.
