= Schwarzsee =

Lake in Fribourg, Switzerland

- Lac Noir
- Lèc d'Omène (Arpitan)
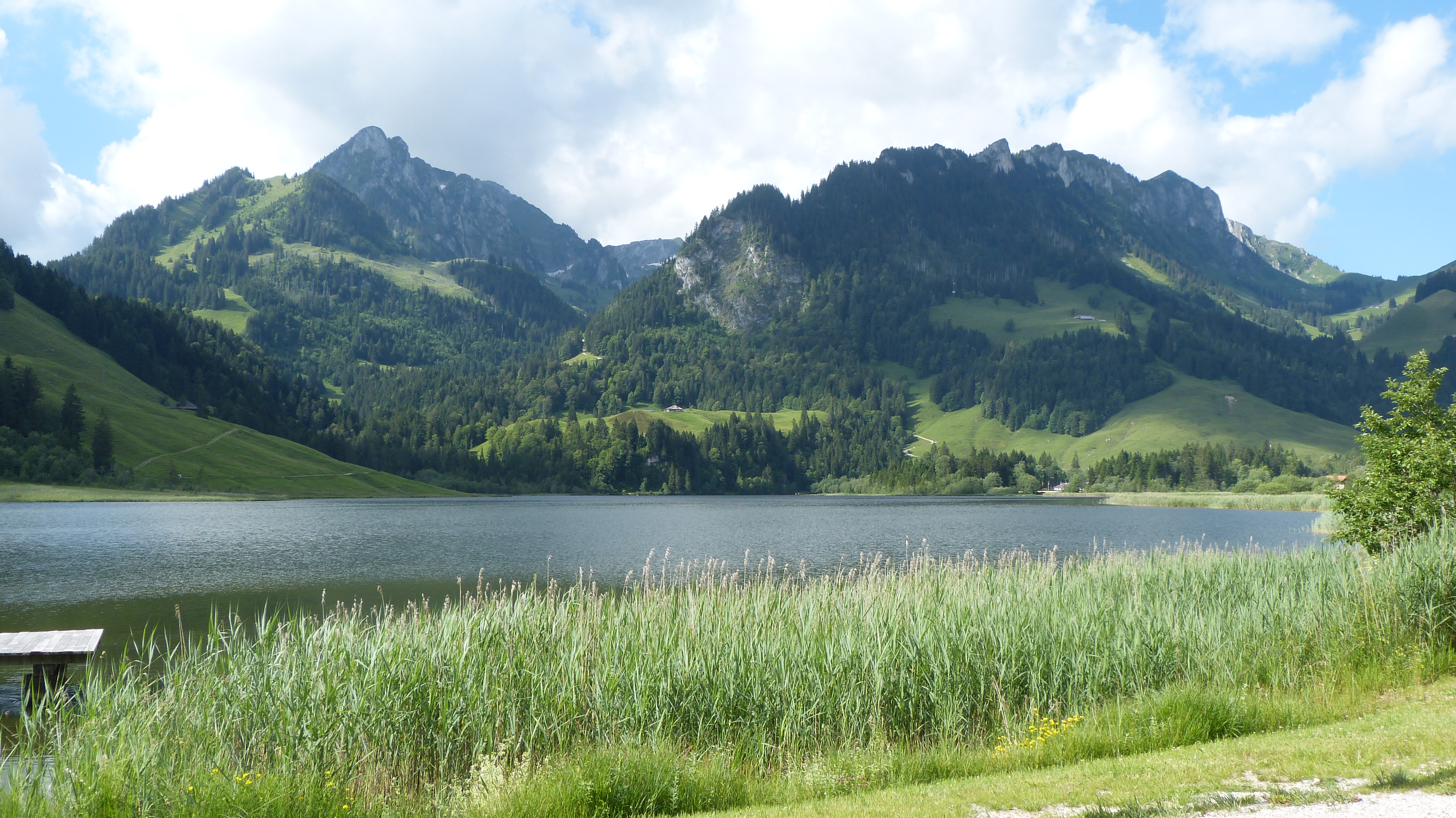

- Location within Canton of Fribourg Location within Switzerland Location within Alps
- Interactive map of Schwarzsee
- Location: Canton of Fribourg
- Coordinates: 46°39′55″N 7°16′50″E
- Primary inflows: Euschelsbach, Seeweidbach
- Primary outflows: Warme Sense
- Basin countries: Switzerland
- Max. length: 1.4 km (0.87 mi)
- Max. width: 0.5 km (0.31 mi)
- Surface area: 0.47 km^{2} (0.18 sq mi)
- Max. depth: 10 m (33 ft)
- Surface elevation: 1,046 m (3,432 ft)
- Settlements: Plaffeien
- Website: https://www.schwarzsee.ch

Schwarzsee (German: [ˈʃvartszeː]) or Lac Noir (French: [lak nwaʁ]; English: "Black Lake"; rarely Lac Domène; Arpitan: Lèc d'Omène [ˈle dɔˈmɛn(ə)]), is a small lake in the Canton of Fribourg, Switzerland with an area of 0.47 km^{2} (0.18 sq mi). The lake in the Swiss Prealps is bordered by the peaks of Schwyberg (1,628 m) in the West, Les Reccardets (1,923 m) and Spitzfluh (1,951 m) in the South, as well as Kaiseregg (2,185 m).

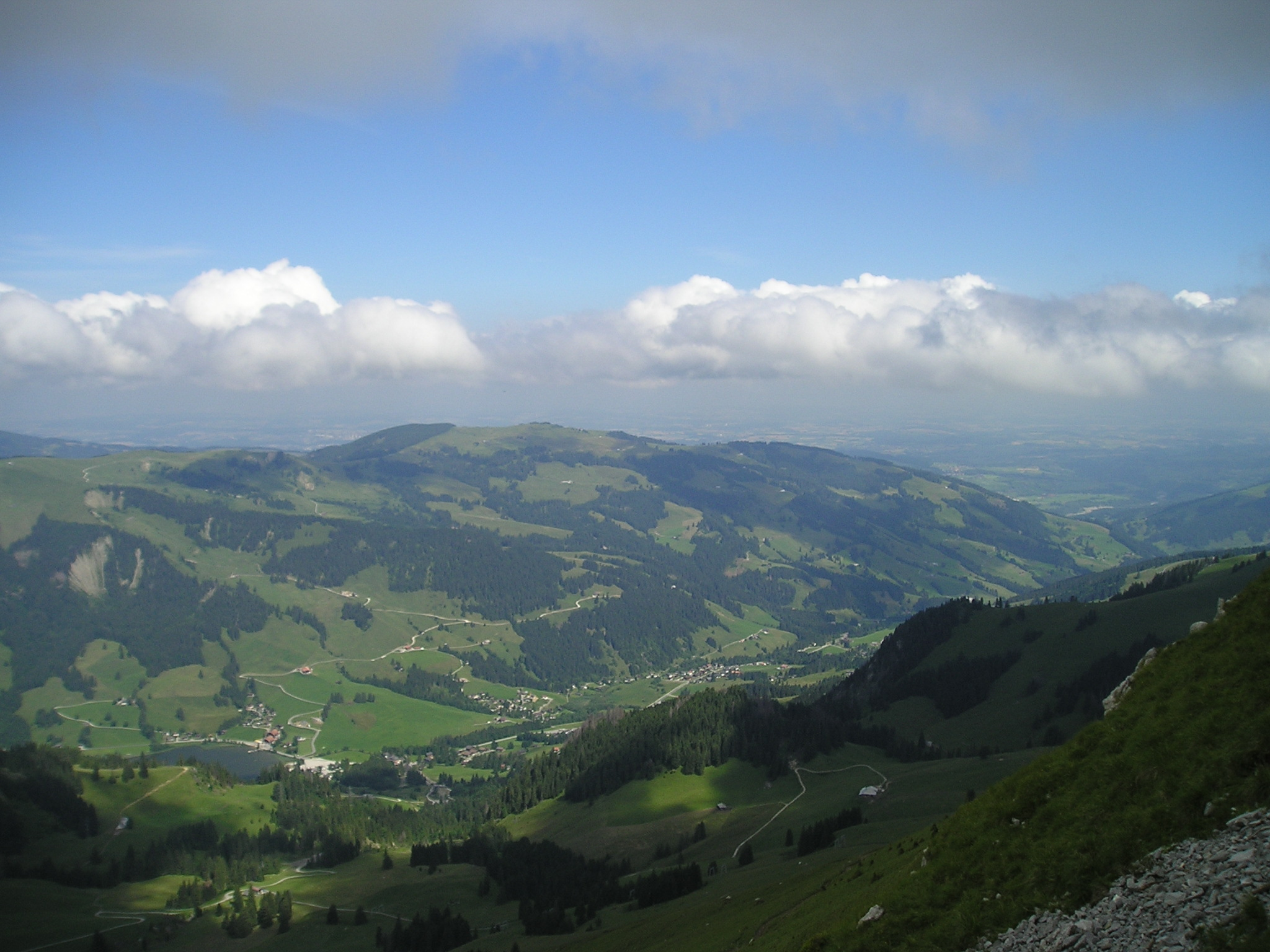
La vallée du Lac Noir

Aerial view from 2000 m by Walter Mittelholzer (1925)

== See also ==
- Breccaschlund
- List of lakes of Switzerland
- List of mountain lakes of Switzerland
