= Breccaschlund =

Karstic plain in the Canton of Fribourg, Switzerland

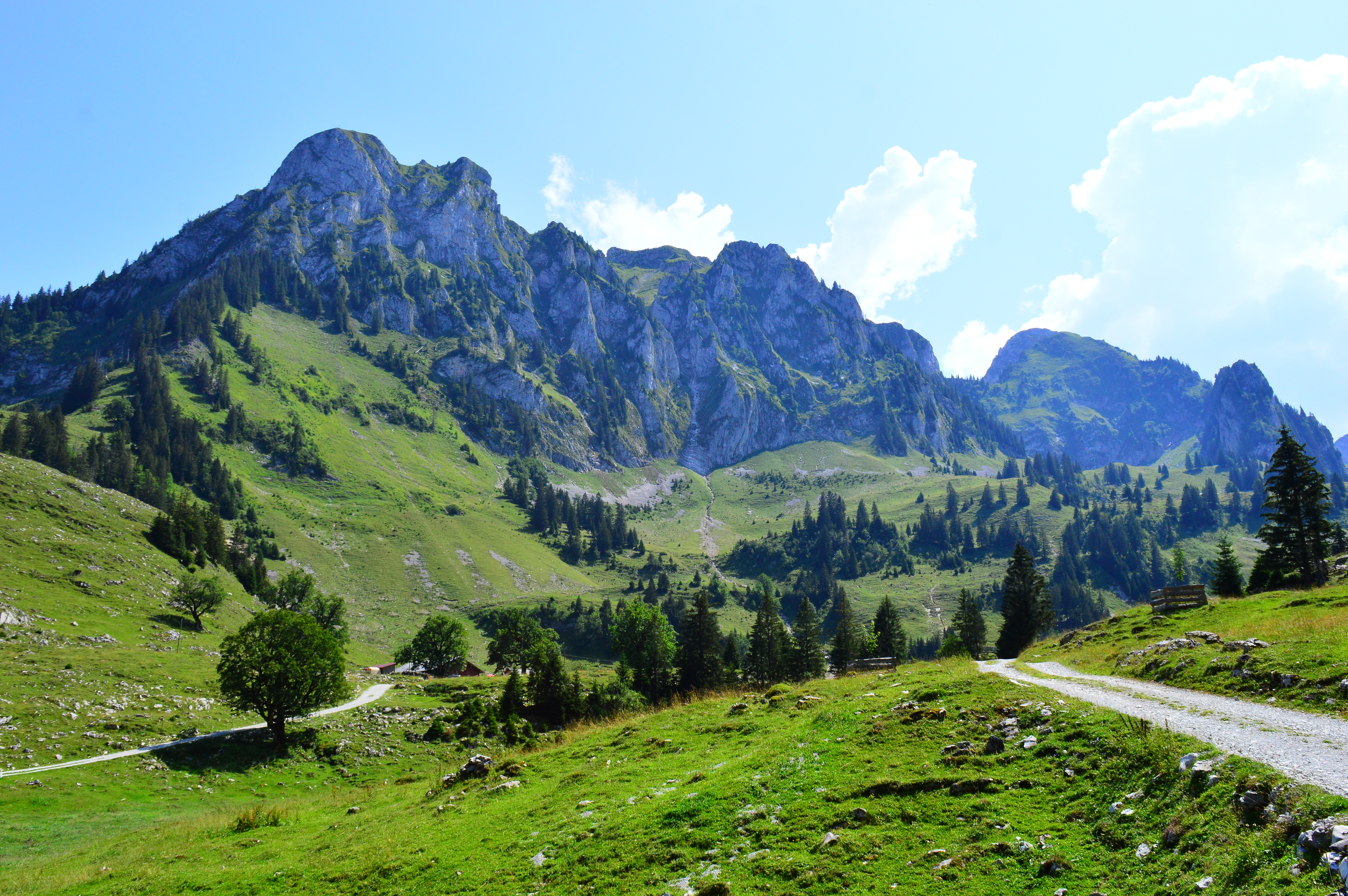
- A view of Spitzflue and Fochsenflue

Geography
- Country: Switzerland
- State/Province: Canton of Fribourg
- Population center: Schwarzsee
- Coordinates: 46°38′58″N 7°16′47″E
- Interactive map of Breccaschlund

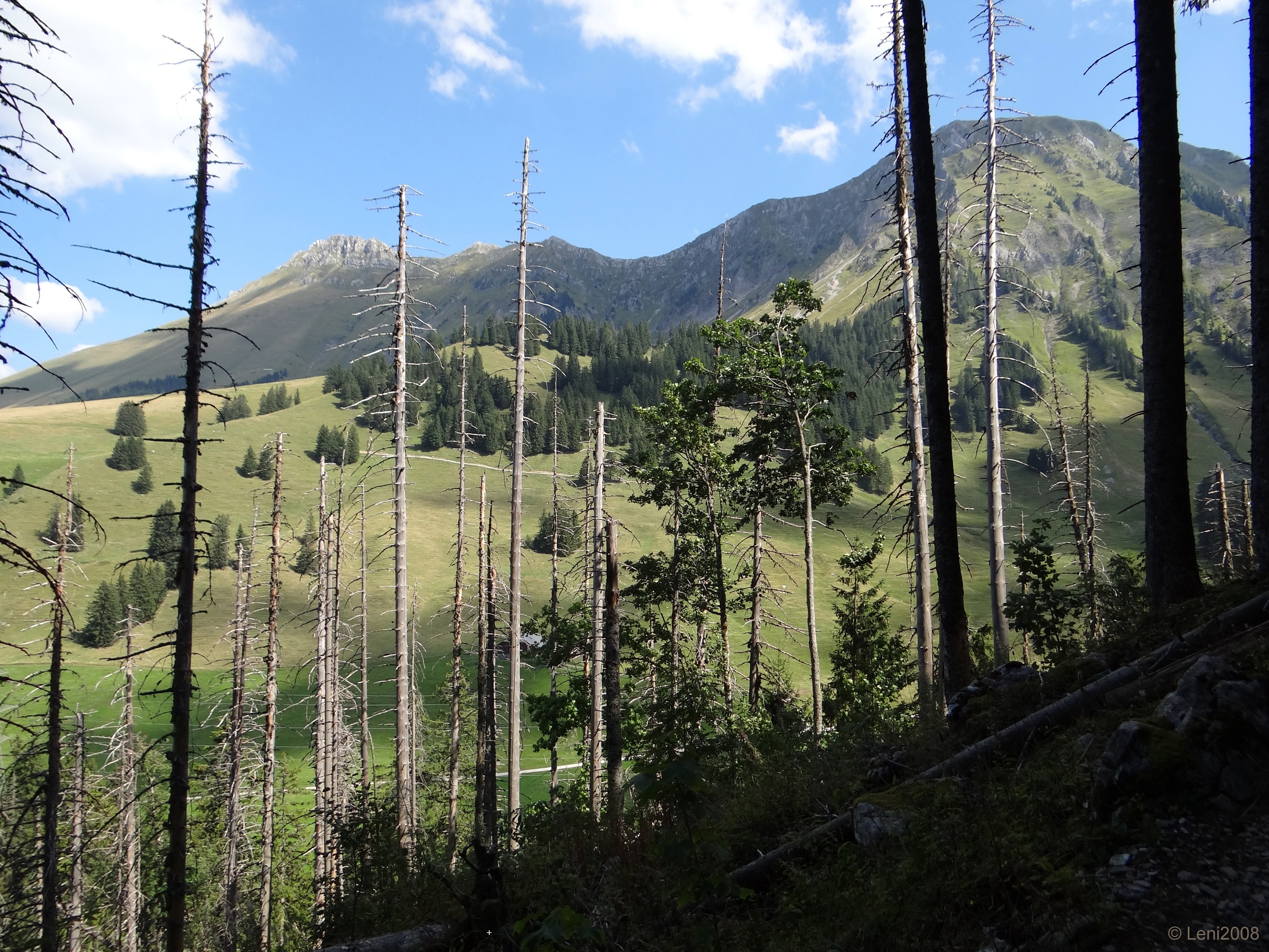
Primeval forest in Breccaschlund

The Breccaschlund is a karstic plain with primeval forest, located above the lake Schwarzsee, in the Swiss Canton of Fribourg.

The area was created by glaciers in the last ice age. Despite the usage as alpine pastures and despite the popularity among hikers, the area continues to be home to a variety of alpine flowers and alpine animals.

The Breccaschlund can be reached by car and public transport, and subsequently by the cable car Schwarzsee-Riggisalp.
