= Kaiseregg =

Mountain in Switzerland

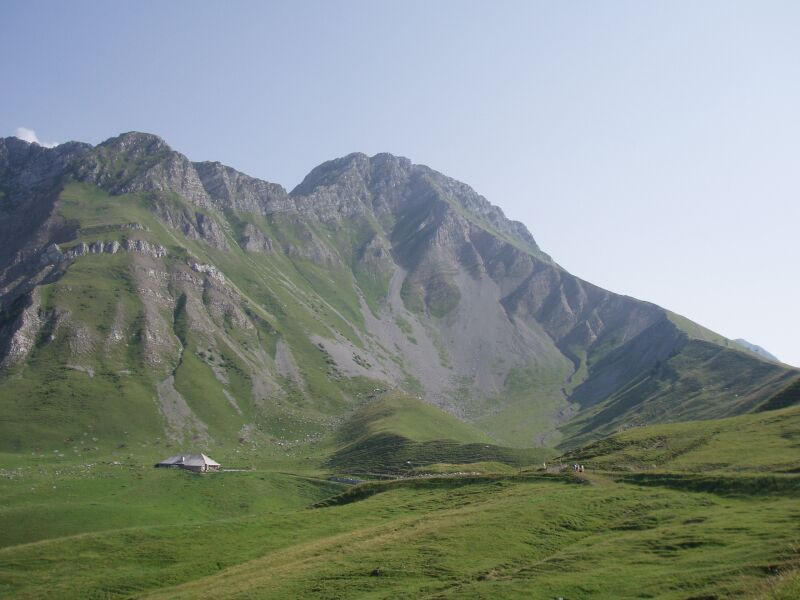
- View from the north side

Highest point
- Elevation: 2,185 m (7,169 ft)
- Prominence: 190 m (620 ft)
- Parent peak: Schafberg
- Coordinates: 46°39′8.7″N 7°19′8.6″E

Geography
- Location within Switzerland
- Location: Fribourg, Switzerland (mountain partially in Bern)
- Parent range: Fribourg Alps

The Kaiseregg is a mountain in the Bernese Alps, overlooking Schwarzsee in the canton of Fribourg. Its summit, which can be accessed by trail, is located a few hundred meters from the border with the canton of Bern.

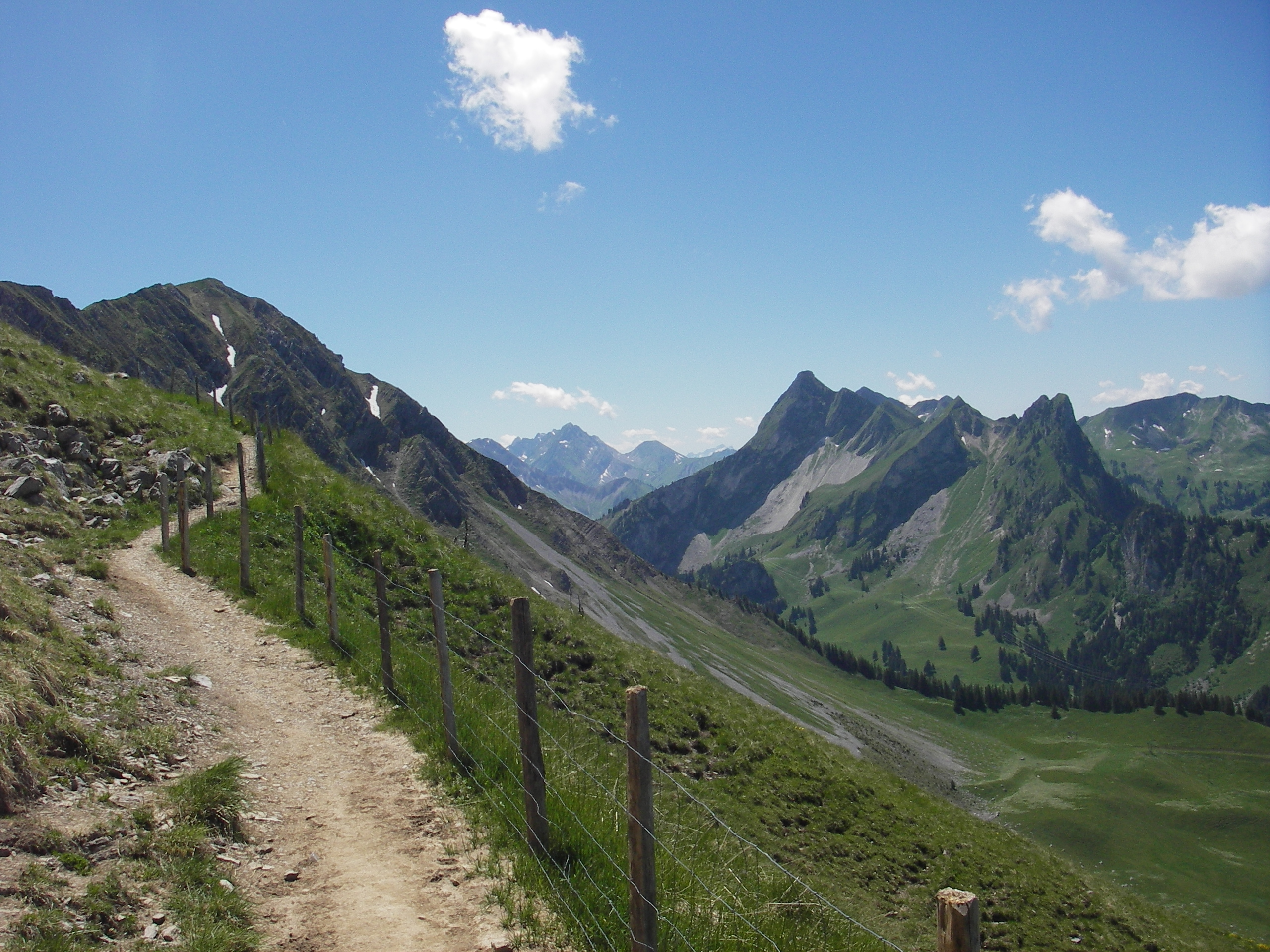
Trail to the summit

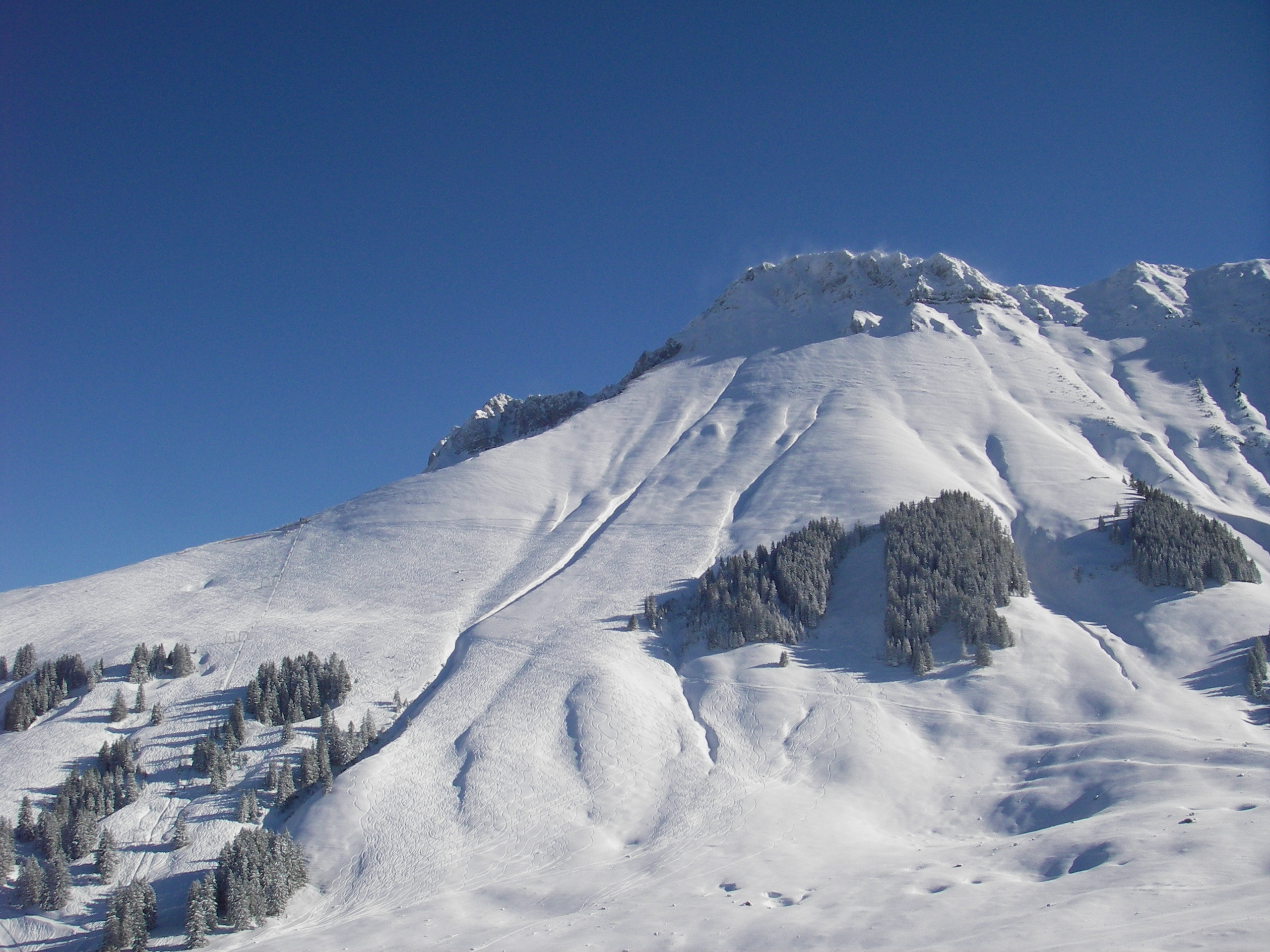
Kaiseregg in winter

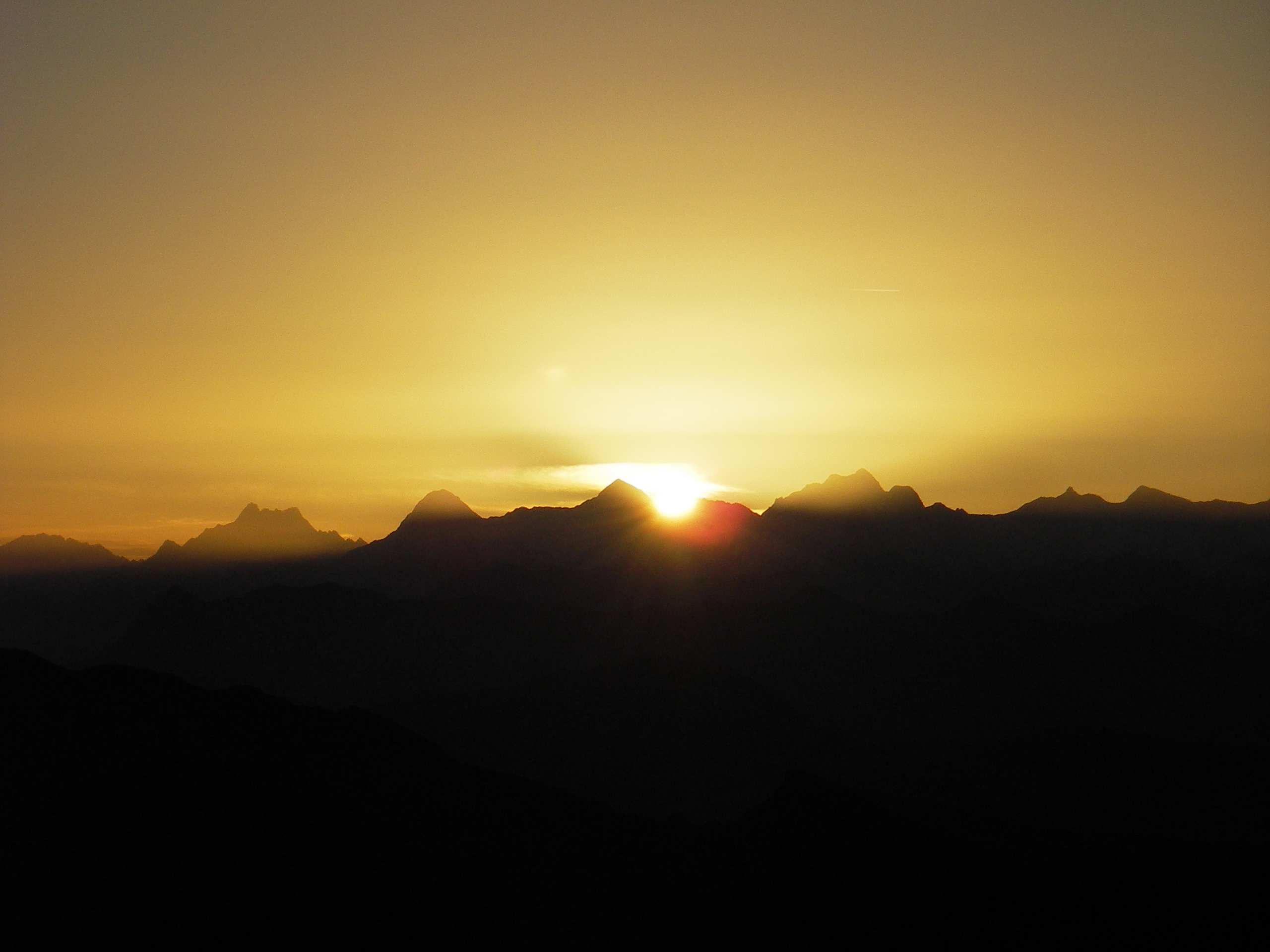
Sunrise with Eiger, Mönch and Jungfrau

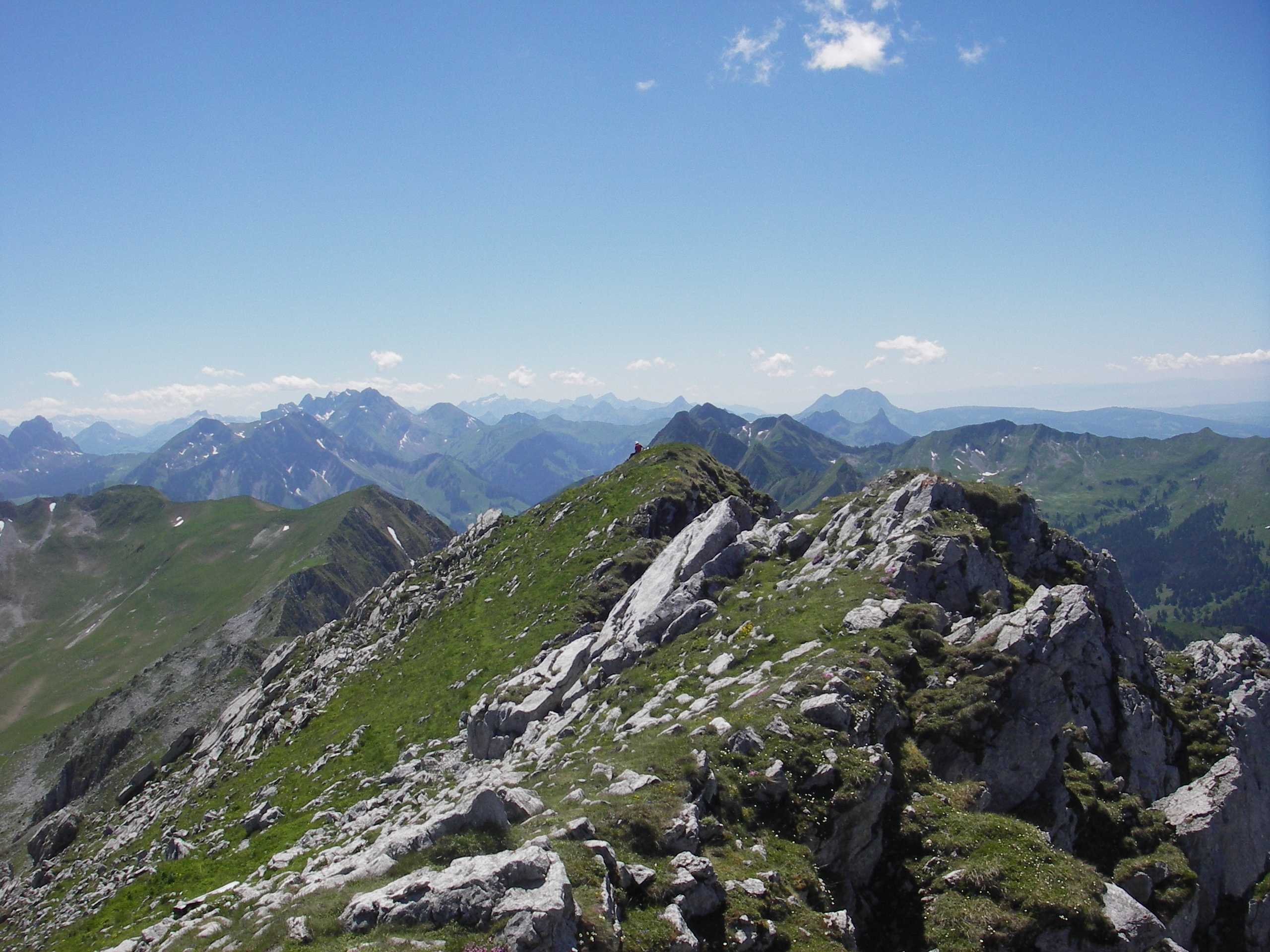
Panorama (southwest)
