= Neujahrsmarathon Zürich =

Annual marathon in Switzerland

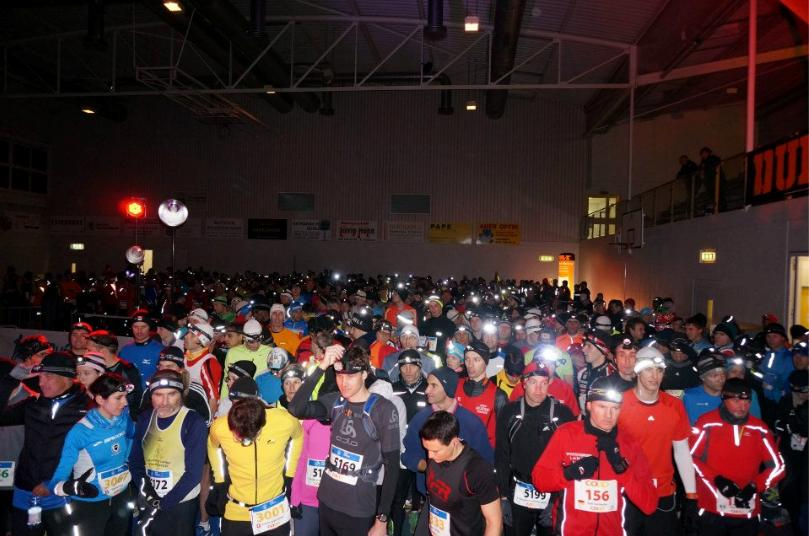
- Neujahrsmarathon Zürich
- Date: January 1
- Location: Zürich, Switzerland
- Event type: Road running
- Distance: Marathon, Half marathon, 10K
- Established: 2005
- Website: Neujahrsmarathon Zürich
- Participants: 222 (2024); 195 (2023); 540 (2022); 959 (2020)

The Neujahrsmarathon Zürich (New Year's Marathon Zurich) is a marathon race founded in 2005 that is held annually on January 1.

The start takes place at midnight, exactly at the beginning of the New Year. The start and finish are located in Schlieren near Zurich in Switzerland. The track consists of four laps along the river Limmat. Besides the marathon, there are also a half marathon (two laps), a quarter marathon (one 11K lap) as well as a marathon relay. The start of the marathon and the finish area of all races are located inside a sports hall. The participants run through the sports hall after each lap. The race is subject to a time limit of 5 hours, which may be extended in case of bad conditions (snow, ice).

Since 2014 there is also a kids marathon on a 750 meters track, which starts at 10 p.m. on 31 December. This race is free of charge for all participants.

== International Membership ==
All courses of the Neujahrsmarathon Zürich are officially measured according to the rules of IAAF (International Association of Athletics Federations). It is one of only seven Swiss road races sanctioned by the AIMS (Association of International Marathons and Distance Races), so the times are accepted officially by IAAF. The other Swiss AIMS events are the Zürich Marathon, the Zermatt marathon, the Swiss Alpine Marathon, the Jungfrau Marathon, the Swiss City Marathon and the Lausanne Marathon. Thanks to its starting time at the very first second of the year, the Neujahrsmarathon Zurich is the first AIMS running event of the year, and hence the performances of the winners automatically qualify as first official world record times of the year. This possibility to run an official record time of the year for the home country attracts runners from about 50 different countries from all continents.

== Organizer ==
The Neujahrsmarathon Zürich is organized by the Verein Neujahrsmarathon Zürich, a non-profit association founded in 2004. In the association's standing rules the intended purpose is described as: The association aims to foster and promote the sport of running. In particular, the association organizes each New Year's Eve the Neujahrsmarathon Zürich. The association does not pursue commercial purposes and does not seek profit.

The latter is reflected directly in the entry fee of the Neujahrsmarathon Zürich. Despite its status as recognized by IAAF, the Neujahrsmarathon Zürich is one of the least expensive marathons in Switzerland.

== Winners ==
=== Marathon ===
Men
year	first	second	third
2024	(Switzerland) Phil Besson	(Switzerland) Philipp Arnold	(Spain) Jaime Gutiérrez
2023	(Colombia) Sergio Rodríguez	(Switzerland) Philipp Arnold	(Denmark) Henrik Westerlin
2022	(Switzerland) Philipp Arnold	(Netherlands) Leendert van der Lugt	(Switzerland) Nicolas Kipfmüller
2020	(Germany) Robert Wilms, Mainz	(Switzerland) Philipp Arnold, Cham	(Switzerland) Stephan Gerber, Lyss
2019	(United Kingdom) Nikki Johnstone	(Switzerland) Philipp Arnold, Cham	(Germany) Tobias Hegmann
2018	(Switzerland) Patrick Wieser, Aadorf	Negussie Bekele, Ethiopia	(Germany) Robert Wilms, Mainz
2017	(Switzerland) Philipp Arnold, Cham	(Switzerland) Urs Schönholzer, Ittigen	(Germany) Andreas Probst, Wasserliesch
2016	David Jeker, Canada	(Switzerland) Philipp Arnold, Cham	(United Kingdom) Sean Fitzpatrick, London
2015	(France) Frederic Ruberti, Sevelinges	(Switzerland) Philipp Arnold, Cham	(Germany) Manuel Laub, Vinningen
2014	(Switzerland) Philipp Arnold, Cham	(Germany) Marcel Knape, Erfurt	(France) Christophe Scherno, Saverne
2013	Jan Fryc, Neratovice/CZE	Christophe Scherno, Saverne/FRA	Antonio Alegre Galbe, Zaragoza/ESP
2012	Markus von Gunten, Bettlach/SUI	Lazloe Boden, Northampton/GBR	Paul Moog, Schleithal/FRA
2011	Dirk Joos, Friedrichshafen/GER	Rafael Wyss, Dulliken/SUI	Jörg Schiller, Frauenau/GER
2010	Dirk Joos, Friedrichshafen/GER	Dietmar Veith, Dettingen/GER	Richard Widmer, Zwiefalten/GER
2009	Konrad von Allmen, Olten/SUI	Urs Huber, Jonen/SUI	Adrian Gröbli, Oetwil an der Limmat/SUI
2008	Pius Hunold, Benken SG/SUI	Emil Berger, Wiedlisbach/SUI	Rolf Frei, Bäretswil/SUI
2007	Josef Vogt, Balzers/LIE	Michael Müller, Dintikon/SUI	Daniel Thalmann, Bern/SUI
2006	Georg Schönbächler, Zürich/SUI	Markus von Gunten, Bettlach/SUI	Jörg Rosenbaum, Mülheim an der Ruhr/GER
2005	Urs Schönholzer, Bern/SUI	Stefan Kläusler, Winterthur/SUI and Fredi Marti, Altstätten/SUI	---

Women
year	first	second	third
2024	(Switzerland) Joanna Ryter	(Germany) Claudia Maria Henneken	(Switzerland) Alma Stebler
2023	(Switzerland) Joanna Ryter	(Germany) Cathleen Lenk	(United Kingdom) Mary Reeves
2022	(Switzerland) Maja Hügli	(Switzerland) Janine Frei	(United States) Deirdre Keane
2020	(Switzerland) Astrid Feyer, St. Silvester	(Germany) Lina-Kristin Schink	(Germany) Kerstin Hötte, Bielefeld
2019	(Russia) Nina Zarina	(Germany) Katrin Ochs	(Switzerland) Katharina Hediger-Weiss, Berg
2018	(Germany) Katharina Hartmuth, Zürich	(Switzerland) Ornella Poltéra, Domat/Ems	(Switzerland) Regula Kämpfer, Utzenstorf
2017	(Switzerland) Astrid Leutert, Bern	(Germany) Kerstin Hötte, Mainz	(France) Atika Kuhn, Strasbourg
2016	(Switzerland) Astrid Müller, Russikon	(Germany) Bärbel Büschemann, Lage	(Germany) Jenny Federhen, Frankfurt
2015	(Germany) Lina-Kristin Schink, Berlin	(Germany) Katrin Gottschalk, Esslingen	(Russia) Tatiana Sviridova, Sosnovy Bor
2014	(Switzerland) Astrid Müller, Russikon	(France) Latifa Mokhtari, Strasbourg	(Switzerland) Doris Russenberger, Winterthur
2013	Astrid Müller, Grafstal/SUI	Abby Knight, Omaha/USA	Micaela Racky, Offenbach/GER
2012	Carmen Hildebrand, Hedingen/SUI	Andrea Käppeli, Merenschwand/SUI	Petra Schoplocher, Cham/GER
2011	Astrid Müller, Grafstal/SUI	Yvonne Hugelshofer, Maur/SUI	Carmen Hildebrand, Hedingen/SUI
2010	Astrid Müller, Grafstal/SUI	Rosa Moreira, Obfelden/SUI	Andrea Huser, Aeschlen ob Gunten/SUI
2009	Andrea Huser, Aeschlen ob Gunten/SUI	Silvia Haab-Herger, Oberarth/SUI	Sandra Tschumi, Solothurn/SUI
2008	Heidi Aeschlimann, Leuggern/SUI	Carmen Hildebrand, Dossenheim/GER	Silvia Haab-Herger, Oberarth/SUI
2007	Silvia Haab-Herger, Oberarth/SUI	Silvia Pleuler, Birr-Lupfig/SUI	Heidi Aeschlimann, Leuggern/SUI
2006	Maria Luisa Costetti, Bagnacavallo/ITA	Silvia Pleuler, Birr-Lupfig/SUI	Melanie Gautschi, Hettlingen/SUI
2005	Jacqueline Keller, Gebenstorf/SUI	Jeannine Vogler, Thalwil/SUI	Silvia Pleuler, Birr-Lupfig/SUI

=== Half marathon ===
(2013: 18.052 kilometer run)

Men
year	first	second	third
2024	(Switzerland) Marco Fasel	(Switzerland) Benjamin Ueltschi	(Germany) Dominik Meier
2023	(Germany) Michael Kirchberger	(Switzerland) Marco Fasel	(Germany) Stefan Zimmermann
2022	(Netherlands) Daan de Groot	(Switzerland) Marco Fasel	(Germany) Michael Kirchberger
2020	(Switzerland) Luca Vogelsang, Bösingen	(Germany) Michael Kirchberger, Roßbach	(Switzerland) Benedikt Laska, Bern
2019	(Switzerland) Daniel Lustenberger, Kriens	(Switzerland) Wouter Berghuijs, Zürich	(France) Thibaud Friess
2018	(Switzerland) Philipp Arnold, Cham	(Switzerland) Manuel Hügli, Brislach	Fumiaki Fujita, Japan
2017	(Canada) David Jeker, Chandolin	(Switzerland) Daniel Föllmi, Hünenberg	(Switzerland) Hansjörg Hegg, Ipsach
2016	(France) Samir Baala, Illkirch-Graffenstaden	(Switzerland) Rafael Wyss, Thalwil	(Spain) Francisco Urbano, Málaga
2015	(France) Samir Baala, Illkirch-Graffenstaden	(Switzerland) Daniel Zwiker, Bäretswil	(Germany) Henrik Stadler, Heiligenberg
2014	(France) Samir Baala, Illkirch-Graffenstaden	(France) Sébastien Treffort, Ferney-Voltaire	(Switzerland) Bernhard Eggenschwiler, Büsserach
2013	Donnino Anderhalden, Zürich/SUI	Richard Stoffel, Zürich/SUI	Peter Keller, Kreuzlingen/SUI
2012	Benjamin Rubio, Ernolsheim-Bruche/FRA	Ueli Bieler, Zürich/SUI	Christophe Scherno, Saverne/FRA
2011	René Boutellier, Zürich/SUI	Pascal Birbaum, Brünisried/SUI	Richard Stoffel, Zürich/SUI
2010	Franck Mouriaux, Glattbrugg/SUI	Richard Stoffel, Zürich/SUI	Daniel Bouzon, Yverdon/SUI
2009	Franck Mouriaux, Zürich/SUI	Patrick Leuzinger, Ennenda/SUI	Daniel Walt, Uster/SUI
2008	Franck Mouriaux, Glattbrugg/SUI	Filippo Neri, Oetwil an der Limmat/SUI	Fredi Rimensberger, Utzenstorf/SUI
2007	Fredi Marti, Altstätten/SUI	Richard Stoffel, Zürich/SUI	Franck Mouriaux Glattbrugg/SUI

Women
year	first	second	third
2024	(Switzerland) Murielle Nigro	(France) Clotilde Boffy	(Switzerland) Liv Egli
2023	(Switzerland) Murielle Nigro	(Switzerland) Elvira Keiser	(Germany) Charlotte Lang
2022	(Switzerland) Klasina Brunott	(Italy) Lisa Oberosler	(Switzerland) Kathrin Roos
2020	(United States) Carrie Donohue, Pittsburgh	(Germany) Henrike Christ, Freiburg	(France) Tatiana Leite, Bourg-Charente
2019	(Switzerland) Arlette Maurer, Olten	(Germany) Nina Kreisherr	(Switzerland) Katrin Saly, Stallikon
2018	(Switzerland) Michela Segalada, Winterthur	(Switzerland) Sabine Kuonen, Lalden	(Germany) Caroline Röhrl, Büsserach
2017	(Germany) Caroline Röhrl, Büsserach	(Switzerland) Beatrice Theiler, Bätterkinden	(France) Olivia Manatschal, Brumath
2016	(Switzerland) Odile Rein, Sonvilier	(Germany) Elvira Flurschütz, Bindlach	(Turkey) Ezgi Akdeşir, Bern
2015	(Turkey) Ezgi Akdeşir, Bern	(Germany) Katja Zwiker, Bäretswil	(Switzerland) Caroline Cejka, Zürich
2014	(Turkey) Ezgi Akdeşir, Bern	(Austria) Friederike Müller, Inzing	(Germany) Jahaira Olivieri, Illesheim
2013	Caroline Steiner, Henau/SUI	Tanja Sonderegger, Rotkreuz/SUI	Franziska Etter, Zürich/SUI
2012	Nadja Kessler, Rapperswil/SUI	Paola Vignani, Alice Superiore/ITA	Nadine Joswig, Zürich/SUI
2011	Elisabetta Comero, Cameri/ITA	Lorenza Di Gregorio, Varese/ITA	Christina D'Ignazio, Adliswil/SUI
2010	Christiane Bouquet, Ste-Croix/SUI	Nicole Fröhlich, Zürich/SUI	Esther Roeter, Zürich/SUI
2009	Lorenza Di Gregorio, Varese/ITA	Astrid Müller, Grafstal/SUI	Christiane Bouquet, Ste-Croix/SUI
2008	Corinne Zeller, Weissenburg/SUI	Daniela Schellenberg, Egg/SUI	Priska Lacher, Einsiedeln/SUI
2007	Sarah Wyss, Carouge/SUI	Tanja Puschner, Friedberg/GER	Nadja Künzle, Zürich/SUI

=== 10 kilometer run ===
- 2013: 12.016 kilometer run
- 2010 to 2012: quarter marathon (10.549 km)
- 2006: 12.234 kilometer run

Men
year	first	second	third
2024	(Switzerland) Luca Vogelsang	(Switzerland) Manuel Hügli	(Switzerland) Lars Ryffel
2023	(Switzerland) Manuel Hügli	(Switzerland) Bruno Albuquerque	(Switzerland) Christian Senn
2022	(Eritrea) Seare Weldezghi	(Switzerland) Manuel Hügli	(Switzerland) Ricardo Pinto
2020	(Switzerland) Fabian Dutli, Geroldswil	(Eritrea) Seare Weldezghi	(Switzerland) Ruedi Becker, Elgg
2019	(Switzerland) Fabian Dutli, Geroldswil	(Switzerland) Ruedi Becker, Zug	(Switzerland) Matteo Pio-Loco, Dübendorf
2018	(Switzerland) Luca Vogelsang, Bösingen	(Switzerland) Fabian Dutli, Geroldswil	(Switzerland) Matteo Pio-Loco, Dübendorf
2017	(Switzerland) Fabian Dutli, Geroldswil	(Switzerland) Gil Meyer, Zürich	(United States) Brad Slavens, Atlanta
2016	(Switzerland) Pierre Fournier, Sainte-Croix	(Switzerland) Fabian Dutli, Geroldswil	(Switzerland) Bernhard Eggenschwiler, Büsserach
2015	(Romania) Gabriel Cristian Lutic, Bucharest	(Switzerland) Bernhard Eggenschwiler, Büsserach	(Switzerland) Fabian Dutli, Geroldswil
2014	(Switzerland) Fabian Dutli, Geroldswil	(Germany) Niklas Rohling, Konstanz	(Germany) Stephan Okle, Reichenau
2013	Brad Slavens, Atlanta/USA	Ueli Küttel, Küssnacht am Rigi/SUI	Thomas Bürgi, Goldau/SUI
2012	Donnino Anderhalden, Zürich/SUI	Roger Ramer, Zürich/SUI	Beat Berger, Olten/SUI
2011	Erich Huber, Rechthalten/SUI	Roger Ramer, Zürich/SUI	Michael Weber, Affoltern/SUI
2010	Ronan Doolin, Dublin/IRL	Steffen Haak, Karlsruhe/GER	Antoine Marchand, Colombier/SUI
2009	Roger Ramer, Zürich/SUI	Davide Vassalli, Olivone/SUI	Reto Hoppler, Zürich/SUI
2008	Daniel Fässler, Evilard/SUI	Reto Klingenfuss, Zürich/SUI	Thomas Winkler, Liebefeld/SUI
2007	Thomas Winkler, Liebefeld/SUI	Roger Ramer, Zürich/SUI	Lorenzo Viera, Schlieren/SUI
2006	Urs Schönholzer, Bern/CH	Winkler Thomas, Liebefeld/CH	Richard Stoffel, Zürich/CH

Women
year	first	second	third
2024	(Switzerland) Corina Ryf	(Switzerland) Sabina Grob	(Switzerland) Leonie Bolle
2023	(Switzerland) Dior Langlois	(Switzerland) Jessica Aeschbach	(Switzerland) Yaël Nusser
2022	(Switzerland) Jessica Aeschbach	(Switzerland) Shani Stockhammer	(Switzerland) Lucy Rostetter
2020	(Luxembourg) Anny Wolter, Kleinbettingen	(France) Margot Guépratte, Publier	(Switzerland) Morgane Crausaz, Pleigne
2019	(Switzerland) Delphine Marmy, Avry-devant-Pont	(Slovakia) Slávka Bouzon	(Switzerland) Corina Ryf, Zürich
2018	Kaitlyn Peale, United States	(Switzerland) Sarah Frieden, Urtenen-Schönbühl	(Switzerland) Zohra Benyoussef, Delémont
2017	(Switzerland) Caroline Cejka, Zürich	(Germany) Lina-Kristin Schink, Zürich	(Switzerland) Severine Combremont, Cheiry
2016	(Germany) Lina-Kristin Schink, Zürich	(Germany) Alicia Maier, Aalen	(Switzerland) Karin Zingg, Möhlin
2015	(Switzerland) Nicole Egger, Langenthal	(Germany) Caroline Röhrl, Büsserach	(Switzerland) Karin Etter-Quabeck, Ins
2014	(Switzerland) Caroline Röhrl, Büsserach	(Switzerland) Morgane Crausaz, Soulce	(Switzerland) Alizée Schnegg, Moutier
2013	Bianca Meyer, Munich/GER	Morgane Crausaz, Soulce/SUI	Alizee Schnegg, Moutier/SUI
2012	Julia Brugger, Konstanz/GER	Nicole Fröhlich, Zürich/SUI	Margrit Bänziger, Ebikon/SUI
2011	Margrit Bänziger, Ebikon/SUI	Marion Zimmermann, Adliswil/SUI	Dagmar Gubser, Berschis/SUI
2010	Corinne Zeller, Weissenburg/SUI	Christel Matthey, Cortaillod/SUI	Crona Brady, Dublin/IRL
2009	Emma Pooley, Zürich/SUI	Stefica Gajic, Eggenwil/SUI	Rosalba Rossi, Giubiasco/SUI
2008	Stefica Gajic, Eggenwil/SUI	Anne-Rachel Boch, Strasbourg/FRA	Andrea Schwab, Uster/SUI
2007	Stefica Gajic, Eggenwil/SUI	Tsilla Vallotton, Lucens/SUI	Susi Mangold, Tenniken/SUI
2006	Stefica Gajic, Eggenwil/SUI	Rachel Buchs, Zumholz/SUI	Anne Gertsch, Neuenburg/SUI

=== Other distances ===
Men
Distance	year	first	second	third
5.980 km	2013	Beat Berger, Zürich/SUI	Emil Berger, Wiedlisbach/SUI	Alexander Grigo, Bad Dürrheim/GER
4.2195 km	2006	Wirz Michael, Birmensdorf/SUI	Robin Lötscher, Zürich/SUI	Sergio Grond, Hedingen/SUI

Women
distance	year	first	second	third
5.980 km	2013	Margrit Bänziger, Ebikon/SUI	Aenslee Tanner, Auckland/NZL	Brigitte Bieri, St. Pantaleon/SUI
4.2195 km	2006	Stefanie Rothenbühler, Wabern/SUI	Ines Bisang, Uster/SUI	Doris Gujer, Affoltern/SUI

== Participation ==
=== All distances ===
Year	Registered	Starters	Finishers
2022	595	551	540
2020	1193	1063	1038
2019	1165	1028	988
2018	1091	995	969
2017	1095	948	917
2016	981	878	861
2015	814	696	683
2014	813	730	701
2013	632	570	539
2012	601	517	498
2011	567	512	490
2010	661	605	587
2009	434	375	361
2008	394	344	327
2007	380	352	341
2006	292	241	219
2005	181	151	132

=== Marathon ===
Year	Registered	Starters	Finishers
2022	147	126	116
2020	272	242	217
2019	293	227	199
2018	240	215	191
2017	268	233	209
2016	258	234	221
2015	205	164	153
2014	244	205	177
2013	226	201	170
2012	202	171	154
2011	198	181	163
2010	207	175	158
2009	141	123	115
2008	133	119	107
2007	123	116	107
2006	147	116	94
2005	181	151	132

=== Half marathon ===
Year	Registered	Starters	Finishers
2022	250	234	234
2020	468	417	417
2019	439	394	392
2018	415	379	379
2017	417	360	360
2016	371	325	324
2015	312	277	275
2014	275	245	245
2013	163	149	149
2012	224	189	187
2011	209	191	187
2010	250	235	234
2009	128	109	103
2008	149	131	126
2007	142	132	130

=== 10 kilometer run ===
(2013: 12.016 kilometer run)

(2010–2012, 2015-2020: quarter marathon (10.549 km))

(2006: 12.234 kilometer run)

Year	Registered	Starters	Finishers
2022	198	191	190
2020	363	326	326
2019	349	329	326
2018	358	330	328
2017	336	294	293
2016	301	277	277
2015	267	233	233
2014	251	241	240
2013	116	103	103
2012	175	157	157
2011	160	140	140
2010	204	195	195
2009	165	143	143
2008	112	94	94
2007	115	104	104
2006	104	89	89

=== 5.980 kilometer run ===
Year	Registered	Starters	Finishers
2013	93	83	83

=== 4.2195 kilometer run ===
Year	Registered	Starters	Finishers
2006	41	36	36

== Fastest times ==
=== Marathon ===
Men
Time	Runner	Year
2:38:21	Pius Hunold, Benken SG/SUI	2008
2:38:28	Urs Schönholzer, Bern/SUI	2005
2:45:56	Jan Fryc, Neratovice/TCH	2013
2:47:09	Dirk Joos, Friedrichshafen/GER	2010
2:47:16	Christophe Scherno, Saverne/F	2013
2:49:05	Emil Berger, Wiedlisbach/SUI	2008
2:49:14	Stefan Kläusler, Winterthur/SUI	2005
2:49:14	Fredi Marti, Altstätten/SUI	2005
2:51:27	Dirk Joos, Friedrichshafen/GER	2011
2:52:02	Rafael Wyss, Dulliken/SUI	2011

Women
Time	Runner	Year
2:59:29	Astrid Müller, Grafstal/CH	2013
3:15:21	Astrid Müller, Grafstal/SUI	2010
3:15:53	Astrid Müller, Grafstal/SUI	2011
3:16:58	Rosa Moreira, Obfelden/SUI	2010
3:23:53	Andrea Huser, Aeschlen ob Gunten/SUI	2010
3:24:58	Abby Knight, Omaha/USA	2013
3:25:13	Jacqueline Keller, Gebenstorf/SUI	2005
3:27:38	Micaela Racky, Offenbach/D	2013
3:28:03	Jeannine Vogler, Thalwil/SUI	2005
3:28:44	Yvonne Hugelshofer, Maur/SUI	2011

=== Half marathon ===
Men
Time	Runner	Year
1:16:16	Benjamin Rubio, Ernolsheim-Bruche/FRA	2012
1:16:43	Ueli Bieler, Zürich/SUI	2012
1:18:00	René Boutellier, Zürich/SUI	2011
1:18:13	Christophe Scherno, Saverne/FRA	2012
1:18:38	Franck Mouriaux, Glattbrugg/SUI	2008
1:18:52	Fernando Figueira, Anières/SUI	2012
1:19:01	Fredi Marti, Altstätten/SUI	2007
1:19:25	Franck Mouriaux, Glattbrugg/SUI	2010
1:19:43	Richard Stoffel, Zürich/SUI	2010
1:19:46	Pascal Birbaum, Brünisried/CH	2011

Women
Time	Runner	Year
1:25:55	Corinne Zeller, Weissenburg/SUI	2008
1:30:19	Christiane Bouquet, Ste-Croix/SUI	2010
1:30:56	Nicole Fröhlich, Zürich/SUI	2010
1:31:53	Elisabetta Comero, Cameri/ITA	2011
1:33:09	Lorenza Di Gregorio, Varese/ITA	2009
1:33:34	Esther Roeter, Zürich/SUI	2010
1:34:18	Nadja Kessler, Rapperswil/SUI	2012
1:34:30	Lorenza Di Gregorio, Varese/ITA	2011
1:34:55	Astrid Müller-Amstad, Grafstal/SUI	2009
1:36:12	Christina D'Ignazio, Adliswil/SUI	2011

=== 10 kilometer run ===
Men
Time	Runner	Year
36:24	Thomas Winkler, Liebefeld/CH	2007
36:45	Daniel Fässler, Muther/CH	2008
36:51	Roger Ramer, Zürich/CH	2007
37:18 (10.55 km!)	Erich Huber, Rechthalten/CH	2011
37:21	Reto Klingenfuss, Zürich/CH	2008
37:28	Roger Ramer, Zürich/CH	2009
37:51	Thomas Winkler, Liebefeld/CH	2008
38:06	Lorenzo Viera, Schlieren/CH	2007
38:07	Heinrich Meier, Dietikon/CH	2007
38:17	Alfred Schneeberger, Uitikon Waldegg/CH	2007

Women
Time	Runner	Year
40:08	Emma Pooley, Zürich/CH	2009
41:01 (10.55 km!)	Corinne Zeller, Weissenburg/CH	2010
41:55 (10.55 km!)	Julia Brugger, Konstanz/D	2012
42:05 (10.55 km!)	Crystel Matthey, Cortaillod/CH	2010
42:07 (10.55 km!)	Nicole Fröhlich, Zürich/CH	2012
42:46	Stefica Gajic, Eggenwil/CH	2008
43:35	Stefica Gajic, Eggenwil/CH	2007
43:39 (10.55 km!)	Crona Brady, Dublin/IRL	2010
43:48	Tsilla Vallotton, Lucens/CH	2007
44:30	Stefica Gajic, Eggenwil/CH	2009

== See also ==
- List of marathon races in Europe
