= Peter Binno =

Swiss peasant leader (c. 1700–1789)

- Born: c. 1700
- Died: 4 July 1789; Rechthalten
- Other name: Peter Zbinden
- Occupation: Peasant
- Spouse: Barbara Piller
- Father: Christophe Zbinden

Peter Binno (born Peter Zbinden; c. 1700 – 4 July 1789, Rechthalten) was a Swiss peasant leader from the Sense district of the canton of Fribourg.

== Life ==
A prosperous farmer in the hamlet of Halta (Zumholz), Binno in 1778 obstructed the levying of a tax intended for the repair of the road to Planfayon, with the support of the local population, and only gave way under threat of sanctions. In 1780 he led the Sense peasants opposed to a new liturgical calendar decreed by the Fribourg authorities. Imprisoned as the author of a writing judged schismatic, he publicly recanted in January 1781 and was freed in February through the intervention of the bishop. He returned to the Sense, which took part in large numbers in the Chenaux uprising in May 1781.

In June 1782, Binno was elected juror by the parishioners of Rechthalten, but the government immediately annulled the election. He died with a reputation as a defender of religion and of the rights of the people.

The son of the farmer Christophe Zbinden, he was married to Barbara Piller.

== Bibliography ==
- Histoire du canton de Fribourg, vol. 2, pp. 733–735.
- H. Foerster, "Umstrittener Strassenunterhalt im Oberland im 18. Jahrhundert", in Freiburger Volkskalender, 87, 1996, pp. 73–76.
