= Jean-Pierre Raccaud =

Swiss militia officer and pamphleteer (1748–c. 1784)

- Born: 21 February 1748; Saint-Aubin
- Died: Last mentioned in 1784
- Occupations: Militia officer, pamphleteer
- Spouse: Marie Anne Cuany (m. 1774)
- Parents: Albin Raccaud; Marie Kolly

Jean-Pierre Raccaud (21 February 1748, Saint-Aubin – last mentioned in 1784) was a Swiss militia officer and pamphleteer, and one of the principal supporters of Pierre-Nicolas Chenaux during the Chenaux uprising of 1781.

== Life ==
The son of Albin Raccaud and Marie Kolly, Raccaud studied in France from 1770 to 1772 and served as a militia officer. In 1774 he married Marie Anne Cuany of Delley. In 1781 he emerged as one of the most fervent supporters of Pierre-Nicolas Chenaux in the Chenaux uprising. He took refuge at Carouge, then part of the Kingdom of Sardinia, where he appears to have enjoyed protection, and anonymously wrote several pamphlets against the patrician governments of Fribourg and Geneva. The police cooperation between Bern, Fribourg, and Geneva to arrest him was unsuccessful.

== Bibliography ==
- G. Andrey, M. Neuenschwander, "Imprimeurs de Genève et Carouge au service des proscrits fribourgeois, 1781–1790", in Cinq siècles d'imprimerie genevoise, vol. 2, 1981, pp. 115–184.
- Le Républicain, 21 January 1999.
