= Jean Nicolas André Castella =

Swiss lawyer and revolutionary (1739–1807)

- Born: 30 November 1739; Gruyères
- Died: 7 March 1807 (aged 67); Fribourg
- Occupations: Lawyer, notary, pamphleteer
- Spouse: Marie Catherine Tercier
- Parents: Jean Henri Castella; Etiennette Murith

Jean Nicolas André Castella (30 November 1739, Gruyères – 7 March 1807, Fribourg) was a Swiss lawyer, notary, and pamphleteer, considered one of the principal leaders of the Chenaux uprising of 1781 against the patrician government of Fribourg.

== Early life and career ==
The son of Jean Henri Castella and Etiennette Murith, Castella studied philosophy at Lyon and law at Besançon. He returned to Gruyères and became a lawyer and notary in 1760. He resumed his studies at German universities in 1767 and obtained a doctorate in law at Besançon in 1768. He married Marie Catherine Tercier, from a family of notables in Gruyère.

Castella held various public offices: banneret of Gruyères (1770), châtelain of the convent of La Part-Dieu, and judicial secretary (1781). He came to play an increasingly important role in local affairs.

== Chenaux uprising and exile ==
A sworn enemy of the Fribourg patriciate, Castella formed ties with several prominent representatives of the common burghers of the capital. He is regarded as one of the main leaders of the Chenaux uprising of 1781, and as a formidable pamphleteer was the author of the celebrated Exposé justificatif pour le peuple du canton de Fribourg en Suisse au sujet des troubles arrivés en 1781. On 14 July 1781, he was sentenced to death in absentia. There followed several years of exile in the Jura, the Dauphiné, and Savoy.

From the beginning of the French Revolution, Castella moved to Paris, where he became one of the leading figures of the Club helvétique. He signed La Harpe's petition to the Directory of 9 December 1797, and then returned to Switzerland.

== Later career ==
Under the Helvetic Republic and the Act of Mediation, Castella, judged too revolutionary, held various second-tier offices: judge and sub-prefect of Gruyère, and from 1803 clerk of the district court of Gruyère.

== Bibliography ==
=== Archival sources ===
- Fonds Castella, Musée gruérien et Bibliothèque publique, Bulle.

=== Works ===
- A. Méautis, Le Club helvétique de Paris (1790–1791) et la diffusion des idées révolutionnaires en Suisse, 1969.
- G. Andrey, "Imprimeurs de Genève et Carouge au service des proscrits fribourgeois, 1781–1790", in Cinq siècles d'imprimerie genevoise, vol. 2, 1981, pp. 115–156.
- P. de Castella, "La généalogie au secours de l'histoire", in Bulletin de l'Institut fribourgeois d'héraldique et de généalogie, 18, 1993, pp. 9–13.
- Chocomeli, Lucas: Jakobiner und Jakobinismus in der Schweiz, 2006, pp. 70–86.
