= Château d'Urendorf =

Coordinates: 48°33′50″N 7°33′50″E

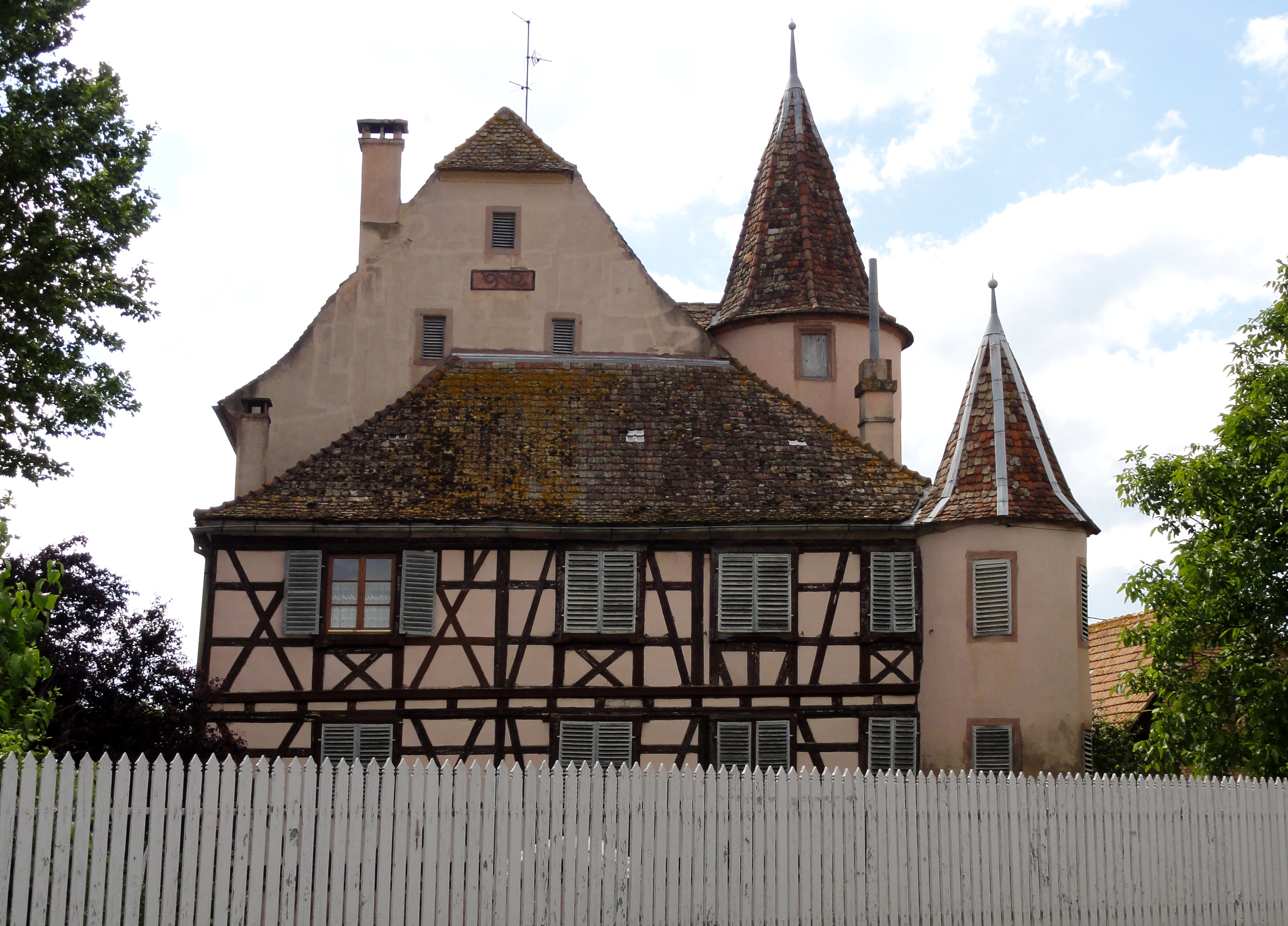
Facade of Château d'Urendorf

The Château d'Urendorf is a château in the commune of Ernolsheim-Bruche, Bas-Rhin, Alsace, France.

The oldest parts of the building (three towers and the main residential block) date from the 3rd quarter of the 16th century. It was registered as a monument historique in 1936.
