= Chenaux uprising =

1781 revolt in the canton of Fribourg, Switzerland

The Chenaux uprising (French: soulèvement Chenaux; German: Chenaux-Handel), also called the Chenaux Revolution, was a 1781 revolt against the patrician government of the city-state of Fribourg, named after one of its leaders, Pierre-Nicolas Chenaux. It was the most spectacular episode of a turbulent period from 1780 to 1784, driven by a combination of economic, political, and religious grievances.

== Planning and outbreak ==
The probable mastermind of the uprising was the lawyer Jean Nicolas André Castella, and Jean-Pierre Raccaud was another of its leaders; but the revolt took its name from Pierre-Nicolas Chenaux. On 29 April 1781, at the inn L'Épée couronnée in Bulle, Chenaux assembled a small group and planned a coup in which a handful of men, led by officers and non-commissioned officers, would seize Fribourg by surprise. The date was first set for St. John's Day (24 June) and then brought forward to the fair of 3 May. The government, however, was already on its guard, alerted by unrest in the Sense district in 1780 and by the Peter Binno affair. Informed of Chenaux's plan, it discreetly ordered his arrest, but Chenaux—who had contacts in the capital—evaded it.

== March on Fribourg ==
When Fribourg placed a bounty on his head on 1 May, Chenaux, rather than fleeing, took the initiative. He mobilized the rural population and on 2 May marched on the capital. The city closed its gates and entered into negotiations. The besiegers used the delay to summon further country people, of whom between 2,000 and 3,000 gathered, while the besieged, in panic, appealed to Bern for help. Fearing that the Fribourg uprising might spread to their French-speaking bailiwicks, the Bernese authorities at once dispatched troops to assist their neighbor. On 4 May, the Vaudois Benjamin Louis Monod de Froideville, a former officer in Prussian service, secured the surrender of several hundred insurgents without bloodshed.

== Death of Chenaux ==
Chenaux withdrew into a wood. During the night of 4–5 May, one of his own followers, tempted by the large reward offered for his capture, confronted him. In the ensuing duel, Chenaux was killed. His body was brought into the city, where it was publicly beheaded and quartered. Soon afterwards, common people began making pilgrimages to his grave and invoking "Saint Nicolas Chenaux, martyr of liberty." This spontaneous canonization was sharply condemned by the Church.

== Aftermath ==
The government's firmness and the repression that followed—heavy sentences fell on the fugitive leaders—proved effective, and the memory of Chenaux apparently faded. Politically, however, on the advice of Bern, Lucerne, and Solothurn, the Fribourg authorities chose a path of conciliation: the parishes and communes were invited to submit their grievances and requests in writing. Of those received from the rural population, none challenged the institution of the patriciate itself, but several called for tax relief and the restoration of religious feast days and processions that had been recently abolished. The common burghers of the capital, by contrast, signaled through skillful and persistent action that they wanted a share of power with the privileged "regiment-eligible" families. The conflict intensified and ended in 1783 with the forced exile of its main figures, who joined the survivors of the 1781 uprising abroad. Both groups (Club helvétique) would welcome the French Revolution of 1789 and return to Switzerland in 1798.

== Bibliography ==
- Hugger, Paul: Rebelles et hors-la-loi en Suisse. Genèse et rayonnement d'un phénomène social, 1977 (German original 1976).
- Andrey, Georges: "Recherches sur la littérature politique relative aux troubles de Fribourg durant les années 1780. Imprimeurs de Genève et Carouge au service des proscrits fribourgeois (1781–1790)", in: Candaux, Jean-Daniel; Lescaze, Bernard (eds.): Cinq siècles d'imprimerie genevoise. Actes du Colloque international sur l'histoire de l'imprimerie et du livre à Genève, 27–30 avril 1978, vol. 2, 1981, pp. 115–156.
- Neuenschwander, Marc: "Solidaires et complices. Les gouvernements de Genève et de Fribourg à la poursuite des séditieux. Imprimeurs de Genève et Carouge au service des proscrits fribourgeois (1781–1790)", in: Candaux, Jean-Daniel; Lescaze, Bernard (eds.): Cinq siècles d'imprimerie genevoise. Actes du Colloque international sur l'histoire de l'imprimerie et du livre à Genève, 27–30 avril 1978, vol. 2, 1981, pp. 157–184.
- Andrey, Georges: "La 'Révolution Chenaux' et ses historiens. Deux siècles de controverse", in: Annales fribourgeoises, 60, 1992/1993, pp. 57–70.
- Michaud, Marius: "L'après-Chenaux. Les troubles en ville de Fribourg", in: Annales fribourgeoises, 60, 1992/1993, pp. 7–56.
- Würgler, Andreas: Unruhen und Öffentlichkeit. Städtische und ländliche Protestbewegungen im 18. Jahrhundert, 1995.
- Kurschat, Serge: Pierre-Nicolas Chenaux. Le révolté gruérien, 2017.
