= Club helvétique =

Swiss revolutionary club in Paris (1790–1791)

The Club helvétique (full name: Club helvétique de Paris) was a revolutionary association of "Swiss patriots", mostly refugees from Fribourg who had fled to France after the Chenaux affair of 1781. The club criticized the aristocratic regimes of the Swiss cantons and was active in the French National Assembly, in the barracks of the Swiss regiments in Paris, and among journalists.

== Activity in Paris ==
The club scored an early success on 20 May 1790, when the Constituent Assembly decreed, despite the Franco-Swiss alliance treaty then in force, the release of two Fribourg men who had been sentenced to serve in the French galleys following the Chenaux affair. The lawyer Jean Nicolas André Castella drafted most of the club's writings, assisted by other Fribourgers such as the lawyer François-Joseph Rey and the wine merchant François Roullier, one of its founders. The first official session was held on 6 June 1790.

The club initially prospered, but soon lost many members: Swiss of modest means for financial reasons, soldiers out of fear of being charged with high treason. After dissensions arose among its leaders, the club closed on 3 August 1791; some members went on to join other expatriate societies, including the Club des Allobroges.

== Activity in Switzerland ==
In Switzerland, the Club helvétique sought through active propaganda to spread the ideas of the Revolution and to provoke uprisings. It founded a newspaper, the Correspondance générale helvétique, of which only three issues appeared. It also circulated underground a violent eighteen-page pamphlet by Castella, the Lettre aux Communes des villes, bourgs et villages de la Suisse et de ses alliés, ou l'Aristocratie suisse dévoilée, and sent out numerous letters. The reaction of the Swiss authorities, however, was sharp, and the club's efforts to incite revolt ended in failure: the Swiss were not prepared to follow the French example. The club nevertheless lay behind certain disturbances in the Valais and the bishopric of Basel, and it helped to change the image of Switzerland held by the French and to prepare the way for the revolution of 1798.

== Bibliography ==
- A. Méautis, Le Club helvétique de Paris (1790–1791) et la diffusion des idées révolutionnaires en Suisse, 1969.
- La Suisse et la Révolution française, exhibition catalogue, Lausanne, 1989, pp. 35–43 (in the French edition only).
