= Oberschrot =

- Former municipality
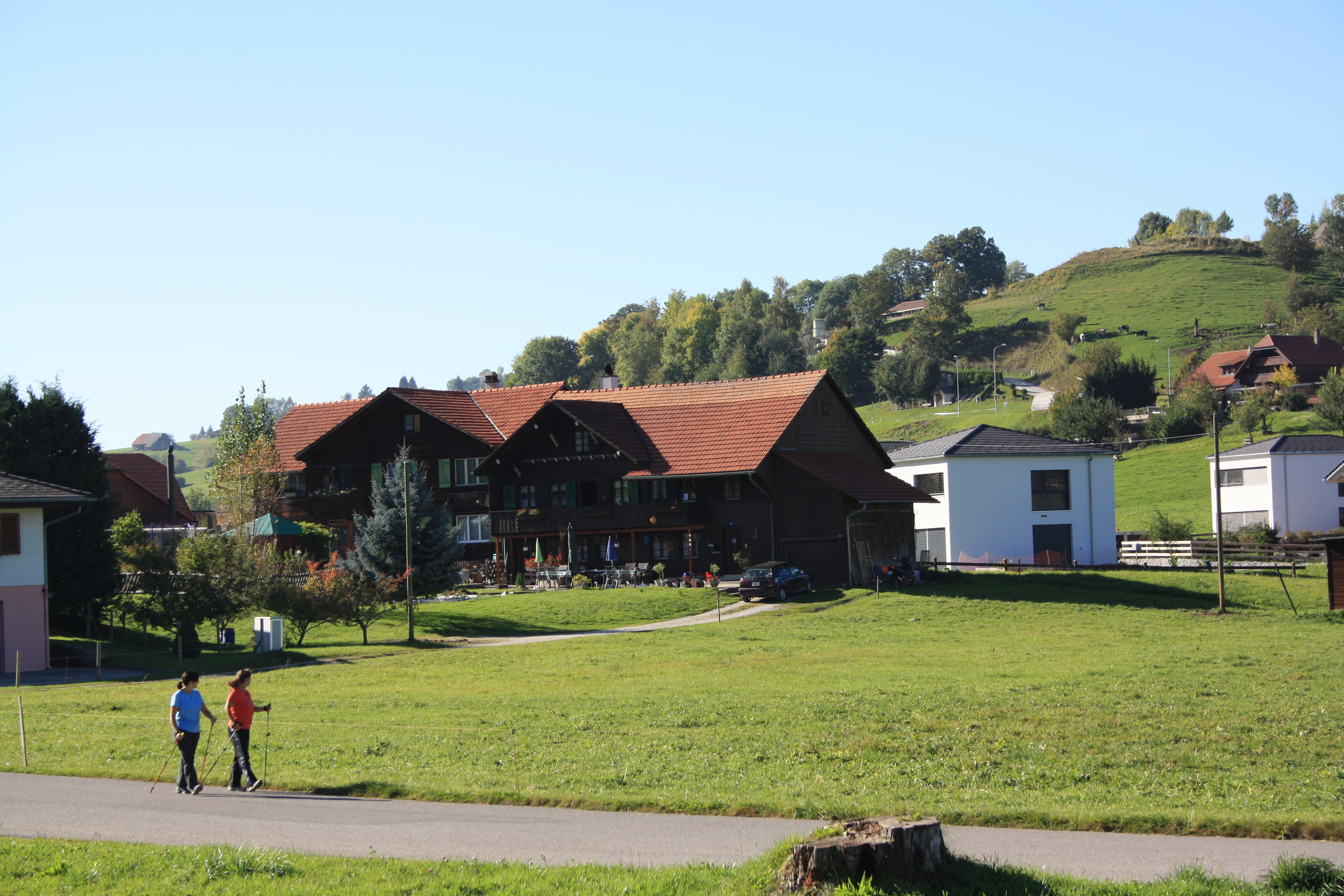
- Oberschrot village

- Flag Coat of arms
- Location of Oberschrot
- Location within Switzerland Location within Canton of Fribourg
- Coordinates: 46°45′N 7°17′E
- Country: Switzerland
- Canton: Fribourg
- District: Sense

Government
  - Mayor: Gemeindeammann

Area
  - Total: 5.28 km^{2} (2.04 sq mi)
- Elevation: 850 m (2,790 ft)

Population (Dec 2015)
  - Total: 1,185
  - Density: 224/km^{2} (581/sq mi)
- Time zone: UTC+01:00 (CET)
  - Summer (DST): UTC+02:00 (CEST)
- Postal code: 1716
- SFOS number: 2298
- ISO 3166 code: CH-FR
- Surrounded by: Brünisried, Giffers, Plaffeien, Plasselb, Rechthalten, Zumholz
- Website: https://www.plaffeien.ch

Oberschrot was a municipality in the district of Sense in the canton of Fribourg in Switzerland. It is one of the municipalities with a large majority of German speakers in the mostly French speaking Canton of Fribourg. On January 1, 2017, the former municipalities of Oberschrot and Zumholz merged into the municipality of Plaffeien.

== History ==
Oberschrot was created as an independent municipality in 1831. Before that, the name meant an area in the parish of Rechthalten that consisted of four Schrote or village sections.

== Geography ==
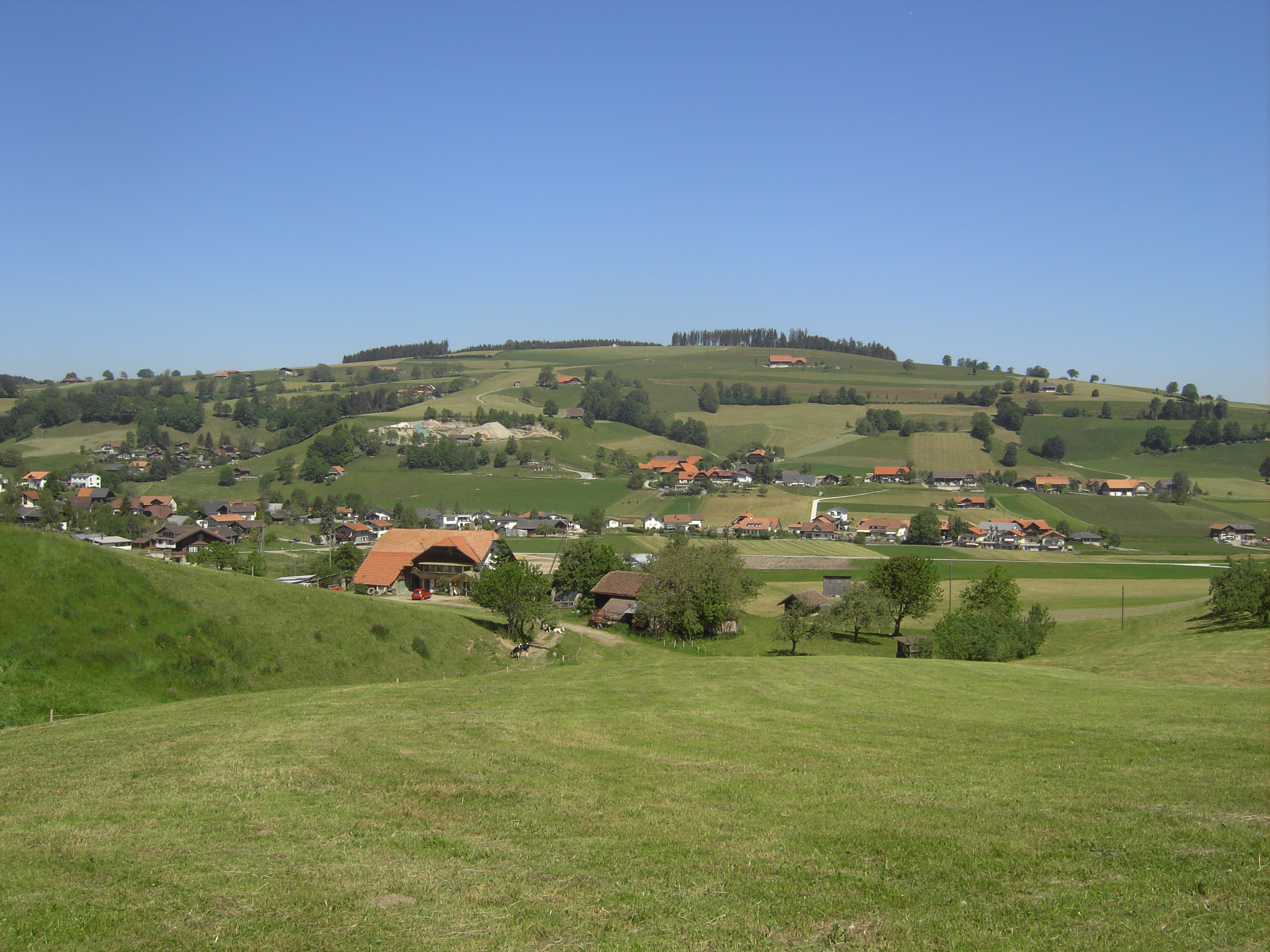
Oberschrot

Oberschrot had an area, in 2009, of 5.28 km^{2} (2.04 sq mi). Of this area, 3 km^{2} (1.2 mi^{2}) or 56.1% is used for agricultural purposes, while 1.84 km^{2} (0.71 mi^{2}) or 34.4% is forested. Of the rest of the land, 0.41 km^{2} (0.16 mi^{2}) or 7.7% is settled (buildings or roads), 0.02 km^{2} (4.9 acres) or 0.4% is either rivers or lakes.

Of the built up area, housing and buildings made up 5.6% and transportation infrastructure made up 1.3%. Out of the forested land, 32.5% of the total land area is heavily forested and 1.9% is covered with orchards or small clusters of trees. Of the agricultural land, 1.7% is used for growing crops and 54.0% is pastures. All the water in the municipality is flowing water.

The former municipality is located in the Sense district, north of the Tütschbach stream. It consists of the hamlets of Ried, Sahli, Gansmatt, Uf der Egg and Plötscha along with scattered farm .

== Coat of arms ==
The blazon of the municipal coat of arms is Per fess Or a Semi Lion rampant issuant Azure and Gules a Fleur-de-lys Argent.

== Demographics ==
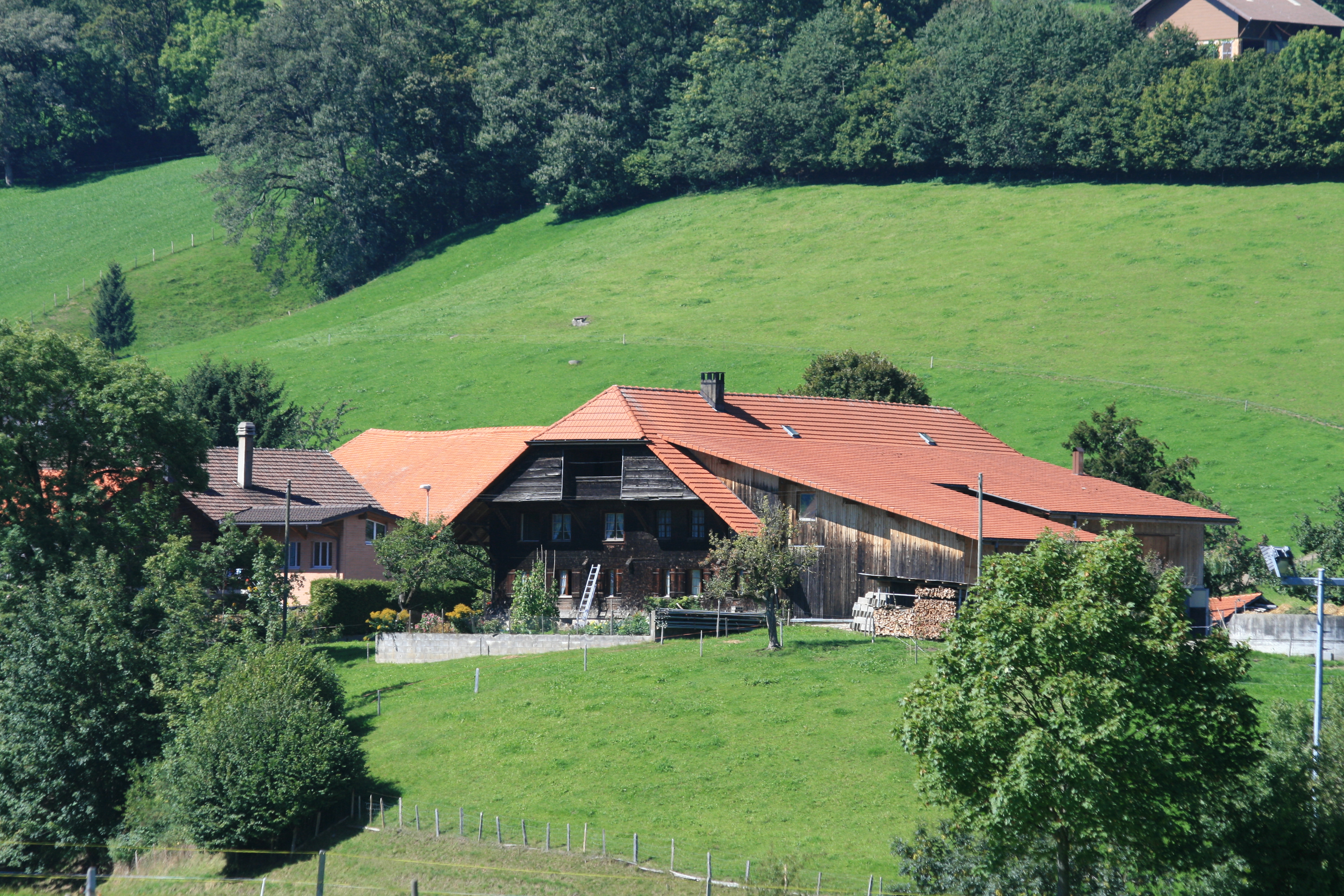
Farm house in Oberschrot

Oberschrot had a population (as of 2015) of 1,185. As of 2008, 3.2% of the population are resident foreign nationals. Over the last 10 years (2000–2010) the population has changed at a rate of 9.8%. Migration accounted for 10.1%, while births and deaths accounted for 2.1%.

Most of the population (as of 2000) speaks German (966 or 96.0%) as their first language, French is the second most common (23 or 2.3%) and English is the third (7 or 0.7%). There are 3 people who speak Italian.

As of 2008, the population was 47.7% male and 52.3% female. The population was made up of 509 Swiss men (46.0% of the population) and 19 (1.7%) non-Swiss men. There were 569 Swiss women (51.4%) and 9 (0.8%) non-Swiss women. Of the population in the municipality, 429 or about 42.6% were born in Oberschrot and lived there in 2000. There were 429 or 42.6% who were born in the same canton, while 86 or 8.5% were born somewhere else in Switzerland, and 32 or 3.2% were born outside of Switzerland.

As of 2000, children and teenagers (0–19 years old) make up 28% of the population, while adults (20–64 years old) make up 57% and seniors (over 64 years old) make up 15%.

As of 2000, there were 467 people who were single and never married in the municipality. There were 436 married individuals, 75 widows or widowers and 28 individuals who are divorced.

As of 2000, there were 352 private households in the municipality, and an average of 2.7 persons per household. There were 87 households that consist of only one person and 41 households with five or more people. In 2000, a total of 336 apartments (91.6% of the total) were permanently occupied, while 23 apartments (6.3%) were seasonally occupied and 8 apartments (2.2%) were empty. As of 2009, the construction rate of new housing units was 8.2 new units per 1000 residents.

The historical population is given in the following chart:

== Sights ==
The entire village of Plaffeien, which is shared between Oberschrot and Plaffeien, is designated as part of the Inventory of Swiss Heritage Sites

== Politics ==
In the 2011 federal election, the most popular party was the SVP which received 25.6% of the vote. The next three most popular parties were the CVP (21.1%), the SPS (16.0%) and the CSP (13.6%).

The SVP improved their position in Oberschrot rising to first, from second in 2007 (with 24.4%) The CVP moved from first in 2007 (with 24.5%) to second in 2011, the SPS moved from fourth in 2007 (with 14.1%) to third and the CSP moved from third in 2007 (with 17.1%) to fourth. A total of 357 votes were cast in this election, of which 3 or 0.8% were invalid.

== Economy ==
As of 2010, Oberschrot had an unemployment rate of 1.1%. As of 2008, there were 52 people employed in the primary economic sector and about 25 businesses involved in this sector. 108 people were employed in the secondary sector and there were 10 businesses in this sector. 94 people were employed in the tertiary sector, with 14 businesses in this sector. There were 496 residents of the municipality who were employed in some capacity, of which females made up 39.1% of the workforce.

In 2008, the total number of full-time equivalent jobs was 209. The number of jobs in the primary sector was 36, of which 29 were in agriculture and 7 were in forestry or lumber production. The number of jobs in the secondary sector was 104, all of which were in construction. The number of jobs in the tertiary sector was 69. In the tertiary sector; 15 or 21.7% were in wholesale or retail sales or the repair of motor vehicles, 7 or 10.1% were in a hotel or restaurant, 4 or 5.8% were in education and 38 or 55.1% were in health care.

In 2000, there were 96 workers who commuted into the municipality and 389 workers who commuted away. The municipality is a net exporter of workers, with about 4.1 workers leaving the municipality for every one entering. Of the working population, 8.7% used public transportation to get to work, and 62.7% used a private car.

== Religion ==
From the 2000 census, 861 or 85.6% were Roman Catholic, while 63 or 6.3% belonged to the Swiss Reformed Church. Of the rest of the population, there were 22 individuals (or about 2.19% of the population) who belonged to another Christian church. There were 2 (or about 0.20% of the population) who were Islamic. 35 (or about 3.48% of the population) belonged to no church, are agnostic or atheist, and 34 individuals (or about 3.38% of the population) did not answer the question.

== Education ==
In Oberschrot, about 331 or (32.9%) of the population have completed non-mandatory upper secondary education, and 58 or (5.8%) have completed additional higher education (either university or a Fachhochschule). Of the 58 who completed tertiary schooling, 69.0% were Swiss men, 19.0% were Swiss women.

The Canton of Fribourg school system provides one year of non-obligatory Kindergarten, followed by six years of Primary school. This is followed by three years of obligatory lower Secondary school where the students are separated according to ability and aptitude. Following the lower Secondary students may attend a three or four year optional upper Secondary school. The upper Secondary school is divided into gymnasium (university preparatory) and vocational programs. After they finish the upper Secondary program, students may choose to attend a Tertiary school or continue their apprenticeship.

During the 2010-11 school year, there were a total of 34 students attending 2 classes in Oberschrot. A total of 232 students from the municipality attended any school, either in the municipality or outside of it. There were no kindergarten classes in the municipality, but 23 students attended kindergarten in a neighboring municipality. The municipality had 2 primary classes and 34 students. During the same year, there were no lower secondary classes in the municipality, but 63 students attended lower secondary school in a neighboring municipality. There were no upper Secondary classes or vocational classes, but there were 13 upper Secondary students and 32 upper Secondary vocational students who attended classes in another municipality. The municipality had no non-university Tertiary classes, but there was one non-university Tertiary student who attended classes in another municipality.

As of 2000, there were 21 students in Oberschrot who came from another municipality, while 119 residents attended schools outside the municipality.
