= Pierre-Nicolas Chenaux =

Swiss revolt leader (1740–1781)

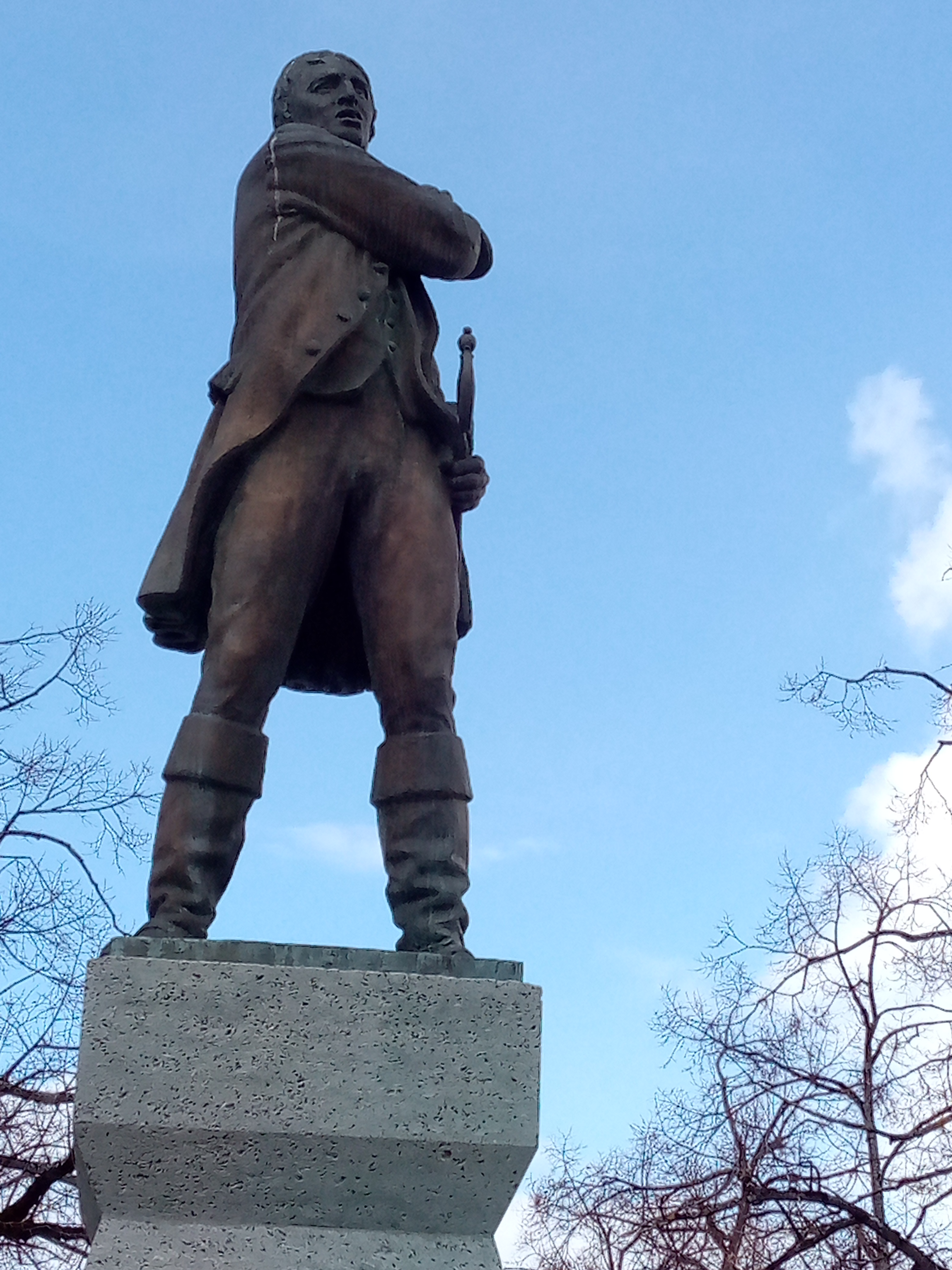
- Statue of Pierre-Nicolas Chenaux in front of Baillival Castle (Bulle)
- Born: 26 February 1740; La Tour-de-Trême
- Died: 4 or 5 May 1781 near Posieux
- Occupations: Militia officer, entrepreneur
- Known for: Leader of the Chenaux uprising of 1781
- Spouse: Anne Claude Guerrin (m. 1767)
- Parents: Claude Joseph Chenaux; Marie Marguerite Repond

Pierre-Nicolas Chenaux (26 February 1740, La Tour-de-Trême – 4 or 5 May 1781, near Posieux) was a Swiss militia officer and entrepreneur from the Gruyère who led the Chenaux uprising of 1781 against the patrician government of Fribourg.

== Early life and career ==
The son of Claude Joseph Chenaux, a wealthy farmer and châtelain, and of Marie Marguerite Repond, Chenaux undertook a training journey abroad and was appointed adjutant major (aide-major) of the Fribourg militia in 1761. In 1767 he married Anne Claude Guerrin, daughter of Pierre Guerrin.

Wealthy and enterprising, in the prosperous Gruyère of his time he turned to business—real estate, tanning, cheese, grain, mining, and the breeding of mules—but without success. Disappointed also in his military ambitions, since a patrician was preferred to him for the rank of major, the Gruyérien fared better in politics. His outspokenness and his vehement criticism of the patrician regime cost him some sympathies, but secured him a genuine popularity, accentuated by his fine bearing.

== Uprising and death ==
Driven into bankruptcy in 1780, Chenaux chose to escape forward by attempting to overthrow the government: this was the Chenaux uprising of 1781. Its failure cost him his life.

== Posthumous reception ==
Subjected to the infamous procedure of damnatio memoriae provided for by the Carolina, Chenaux was forgotten until 1848, when the radical regime officially rehabilitated him. In 1933, a monumental statue was erected at Bulle in honor of the "defender of the liberties of the people".

== Bibliography ==
- Andrey, Georges: "Le monument Chenaux. La fête, le symbole", in Cahiers du Musée gruérien, 1997, pp. 57–70.
- Andrey, Georges: "Les métamorphoses du héros de la liberté. Chenaux à l'assaut de l'ancien régime (1781–1798)", in Fribourg 1798. Une révolution culturelle?, 1998, pp. 21–27.
- Andrey, Georges: "L'odyssée posthume de Pierre-Nicolas Chenaux (1781–1981)", in Histoire et légende. Six exemples en Suisse romande: Baillod, Bonivard, Davel, Chenaux, Péquignat et Farinet, 1987, pp. 59–71.
- Andrey, Georges: "Pierre-Nicolas Chenaux, de la 'damnatio memoriae' au culte du souvenir", in Annales fribourgeoises, 61/62, 1994/1997, pp. 187–194.
- Kurschat, Serge: Pierre-Nicolas Chenaux. Le révolté gruérien, 2017.
- Zurich, Pierre de: "Pierre-Nicolas Chenaux 1740–1781", in Annales fribourgeoises, 23, 1935, pp. 34–49, 74–80, 109–128, 143–156, 171–184.
