= Caroline Cejka =

Swiss orienteering competitor

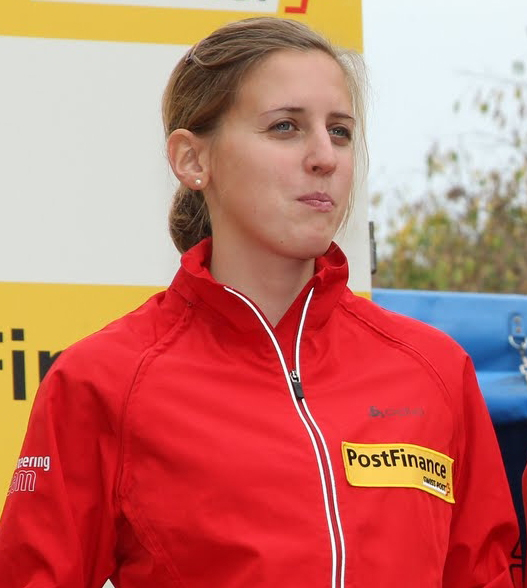
- Cejka in 2010

Medal record

Women's orienteering

Representing Switzerland

European Championships
Bronze medal – third place	2010 Primorsko	Relay

Caroline Cejka (born 29 October 1985) is a Swiss orienteering competitor.

She competed at the 2009 World Orienteering Championships in Miskolc, where she placed 26th in the long distance. She won a bronze medal in the relay with the Swiss team at the 2010 European Orienteering Championships in Primorsko.
