= Ernolsheim-Bruche =

Ernolsheim-Bruche Arelse
- Commune
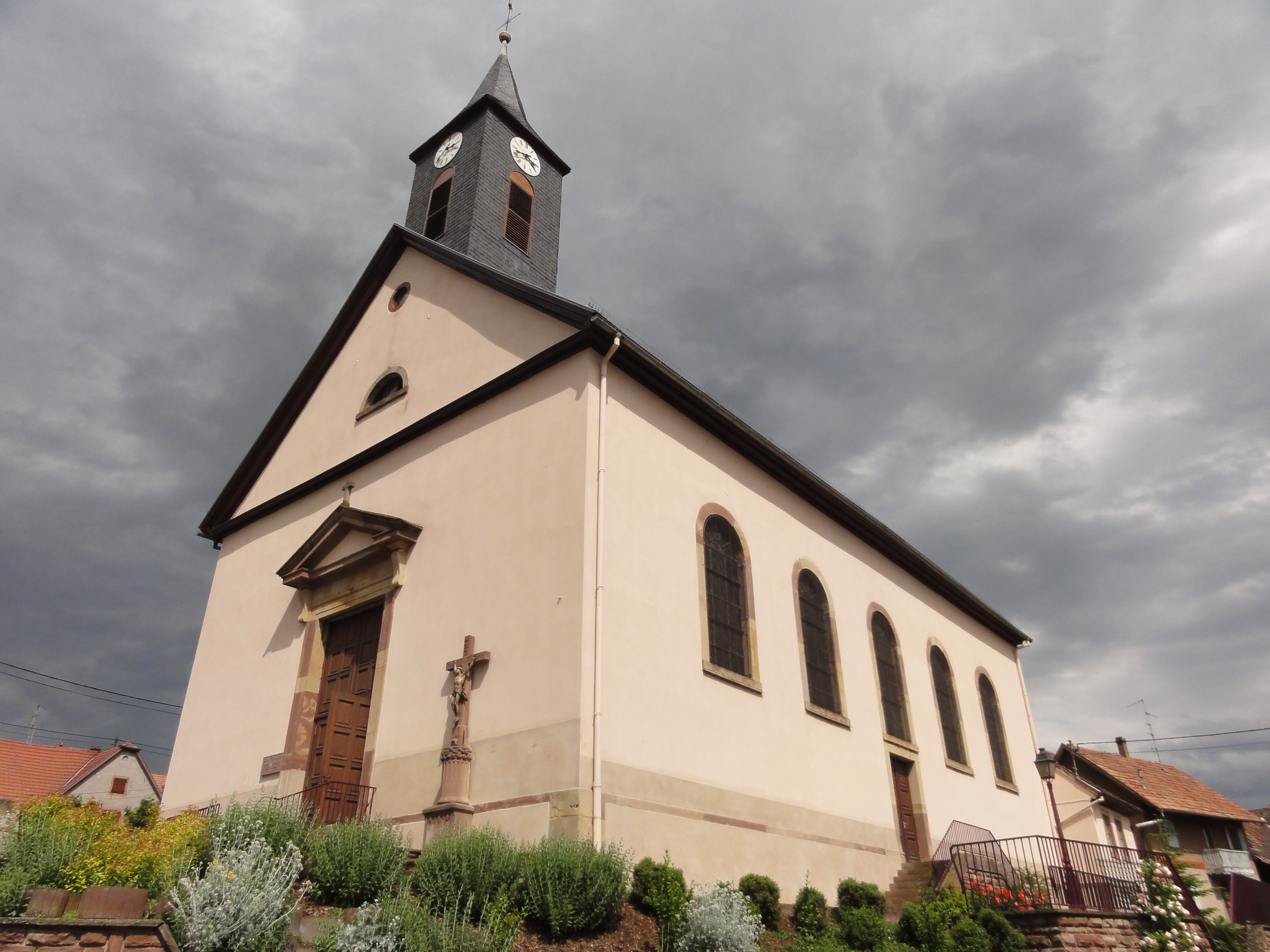
- The church in Ernolsheim

- Coat of arms
- Location of Ernolsheim-Bruche
- Location within France Location within Grand Est
- Coordinates: 48°33′52″N 7°33′58″E
- Country: France
- Region: Grand Est
- Department: Bas-Rhin
- Arrondissement: Molsheim
- Canton: Molsheim

Government
  - Mayor (2020–2026): Eric Franchet
- Area^{1}: 6.59 km^{2} (2.54 sq mi)
- Highest elevation: 206 m (676 ft)
- Lowest elevation: 154 m (505 ft)
- Population (2023): 1,936
  - Density: 294/km^{2} (761/sq mi)
- Time zone: UTC+01:00 (CET)
  - Summer (DST): UTC+02:00 (CEST)
- INSEE/Postal code: 67128 /67120
- ^{1} French Land Register data, which excludes lakes, ponds, glaciers > 1 km^{2} (0.386 sq mi or 247 acres) and river estuaries.

Ernolsheim-Bruche (German: Ernolsheim) is a commune, in the Bas-Rhin department in Grand Est in north-eastern France.

The Château d'Urendorf is situated here.

== See also ==
- Communes of the Bas-Rhin department
