= Plaffeien =

- Municipality
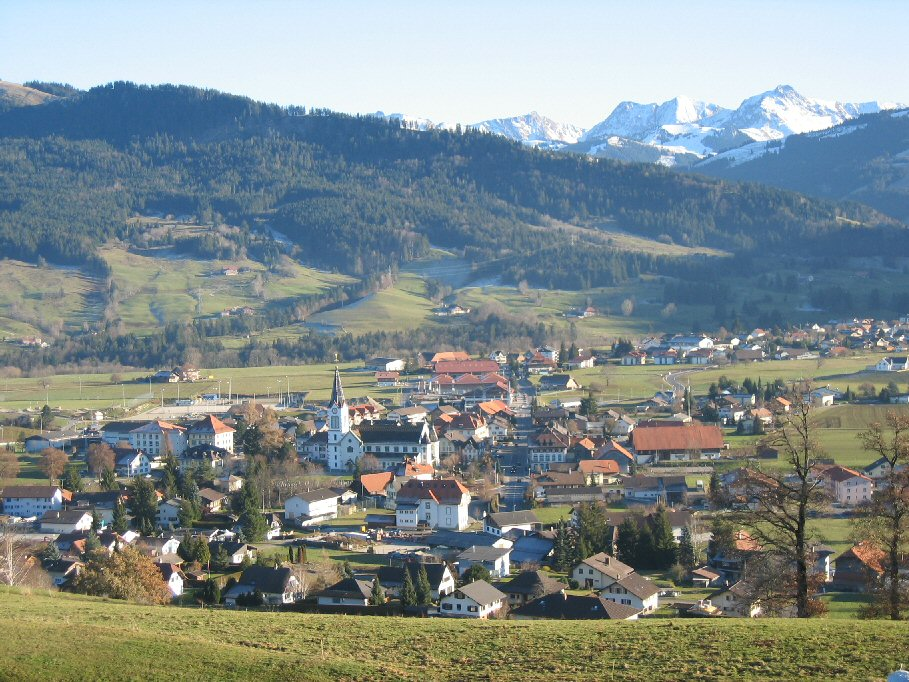
- Plaffeien village

- Flag Coat of arms
- Location of Plaffeien
- Location within Switzerland Location within Canton of Fribourg
- Coordinates: 46°44′N 7°17′E
- Country: Switzerland
- Canton: Fribourg
- District: Sense

Government
  - Mayor: Ammann; Daniel Bürdel

Area
  - Total: 66.53 km^{2} (25.69 sq mi)
- Elevation: 856 m (2,808 ft)

Population (December 2020)
  - Total: 3,613
  - Density: 54.31/km^{2} (140.7/sq mi)
- Time zone: UTC+01:00 (CET)
  - Summer (DST): UTC+02:00 (CEST)
- Postal codes: 1716 Plaffeien; 1716 Oberschrot; 1716 Schwarzsee; 1719 Zumholz
- SFOS number: 2299
- ISO 3166 code: CH-FR
- Localities: Schwarzsee
- Surrounded by: Brünisried, Giffers, Jaun, Plasselb, Rechthalten, Tafers and Val-de-Charmey in the canton of Fribourg, such as Boltigen, Guggisberg and Oberwil im Simmental in the canton of Bern.
- Twin towns: Kasterlee (Belgium)
- Website: www.plaffeien.ch

Plaffeien (French: Planfayon; Arpitan: Pllanfayon [plɑ̃faˈjɔ̃]) is a municipality in the district of Sense in the canton of Fribourg in Switzerland. It is one of the municipalities with a large majority of German speakers in the mostly French speaking Canton of Fribourg.

== History ==
Plaffeien is first mentioned in 1148 as Planfeiun. In 1339 it was mentioned as Blanfeyen.

=== Name ===
The name Plaffeien probably comes from the Latin "planum-fageum" meaning beech forest and therefore may date to the Roman era. The spelling of the name changed over time. In addition to the spellings given above, in the 13th century it was Planfeium, followed by Plainfaon or Planfeyen. Beginning around the 16th century the name became Plaffeyen. To match the standard German orthography of the German Empire, an 1899 Swiss federal decree changed the "y" in German place names into an "i", changing the official name to "Plaffeien".

=== Brief history ===
During the Roman era Plaffeien was probably a village of romanised Celts. Beginning around the end of the fifth century, the German speaking Alemanni slowly moved into the area and settled.

The first written records of Plaffeien are from Rüeggisberg Priory in 1148, which mention a village church. The church was probably built a few years previously. When the church was demolished in 1762, a stone with the year 1143 was discovered. A village school was established before 1717.

In the 14th century, the nobleman Wilhelm von Englisberg donated a forest and the commons to the village, with the requirement that a mass be held in his honor every year on 25 July. This mass is still held every year.

Plaffeien became a bailiwick of Fribourg in 1486 and remained so until the French invasion of Switzerland in 1798. Plaffeien's location along the road to the Euschelspass and on the banks of the Sense river meant the area was invaded several times during the wars between Bern and Fribourg. During the Reformation the village remained with the Catholic faith.

=== The village fire ===
On 31 May 1906, much of Plaffeien was destroyed in about two hours by a fire. A total of 51 houses burned down, 15 in the village of Oberschrot and 36 in Plaffeien, leaving 62 families or 274 people homeless. They began rebuilding in the summer of 1906 and the corner stone of the current church was laid on 26 April 1908. A new plan was drawn up for the village, replacing the old village with its narrow winding streets.

=== Merger ===
In 2017 the former municipalities of Zumholz and Oberschrot merged into the municipality of Plaffeien.

== Geography ==
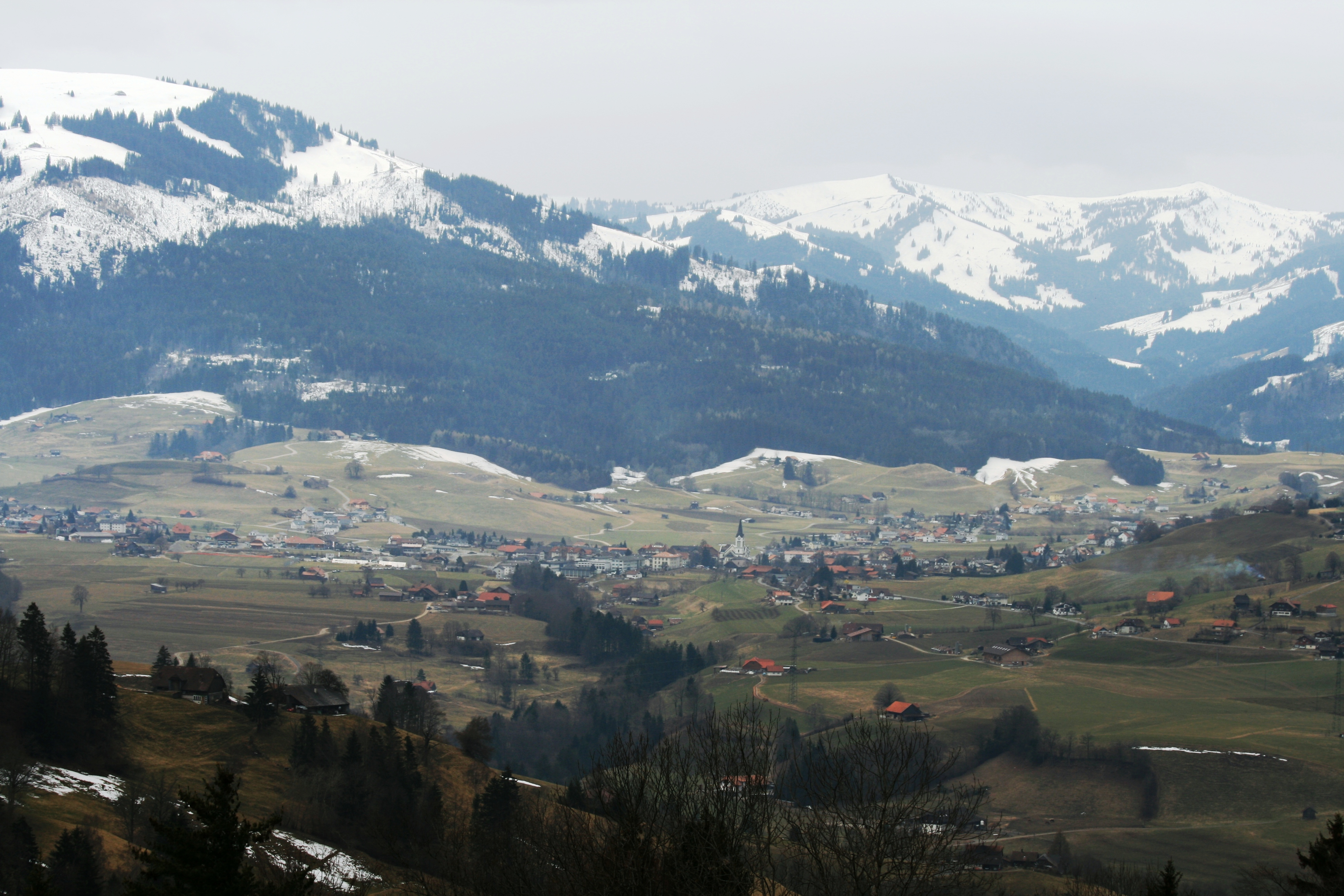
Plaffeien and Oberschrot municipalities

Aerial view from 2000 m by Walter Mittelholzer (1925)

After the 2017 merger Plaffeien had an area of 66.53 km^{2} (25.69 sq mi).

Before the merger Plaffeien had an area, (as of the 2004/09 survey) of 59.41 square kilometers (22.94 sq mi). Of this area, about 48.1% is used for agricultural purposes, while 38.1% is forested. Of the rest of the land, 2.9% is settled (buildings or roads) and 10.9% is unproductive land. In the 2013/18 survey a total of 104 ha (260 acres) or about 1.7% of the total area was covered with buildings, an increase of 38 ha (94 acres) over the 1981 amount. Over the same time period, the amount of recreational space in the municipality increased by 7 ha (17 acres) and is now about 0.20% of the total area. Of the agricultural land, 4 ha (9.9 acres) is used for orchards and vineyards, 638 ha (1,580 acres) is fields and grasslands and 2,446 ha (6,040 acres) consists of alpine grazing areas. Since 1981 the amount of agricultural land has decreased by 239 ha (590 acres). Over the same time period the amount of forested land has increased by 242 ha (600 acres). Rivers and lakes cover 119 ha (290 acres) in the municipality.

The municipality is located in the Sense district. The village of Plaffeien is located about 12 km (7.5 mi) south-east of Fribourg. In addition to the village, the municipality includes the Muscherenschlund valley, the Schwarzsee valley and the peak of the Schafberg at an elevation of 2,235 m (7,333 ft) above sea level.

== Coat of arms ==
The blazon of the municipal coat of arms is Sable a Bar Argent.

In black a silver bar covered with two blue wave borders, over which lies a golden lily.

In black a silver bar (old coat of arms of the Plaffeien municipality). In the upper area as symbol of unity a golden lily (lily of the Lords of Maggenberg, from the old coats of arms of the municipalities Oberschrot and Zumholz). The two blue wave ridges symbolise the natural, species-rich river landscape of the Sense and the historically and culturally important Dütschbach, both of which flow through the area of the future municipality.

The newly created coat of arms of the BOPPZ five merger project has been adopted unchanged. Only in the blazoning (description) has the Dütschbach taken the place of the Aergera and with regard to the lily of the Lords of Maggenberg, reference is made to the current coats of arms of the municipalities of Oberschrot and Zumholz. The coat of arms as well as its blazoning has been positively assessed by the State Archives Freiburg.

== Demographics ==
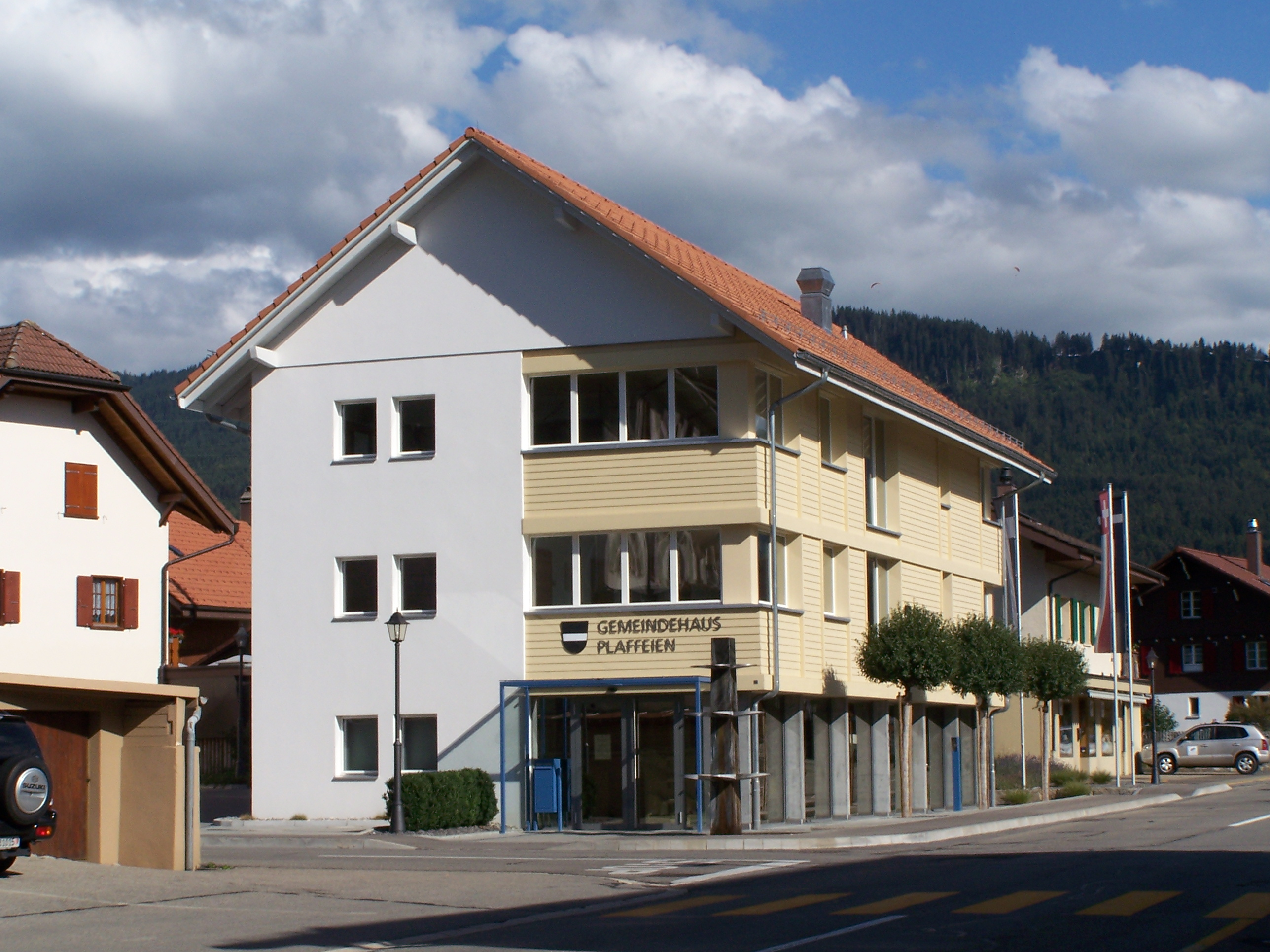
Town hall of Plaffeien

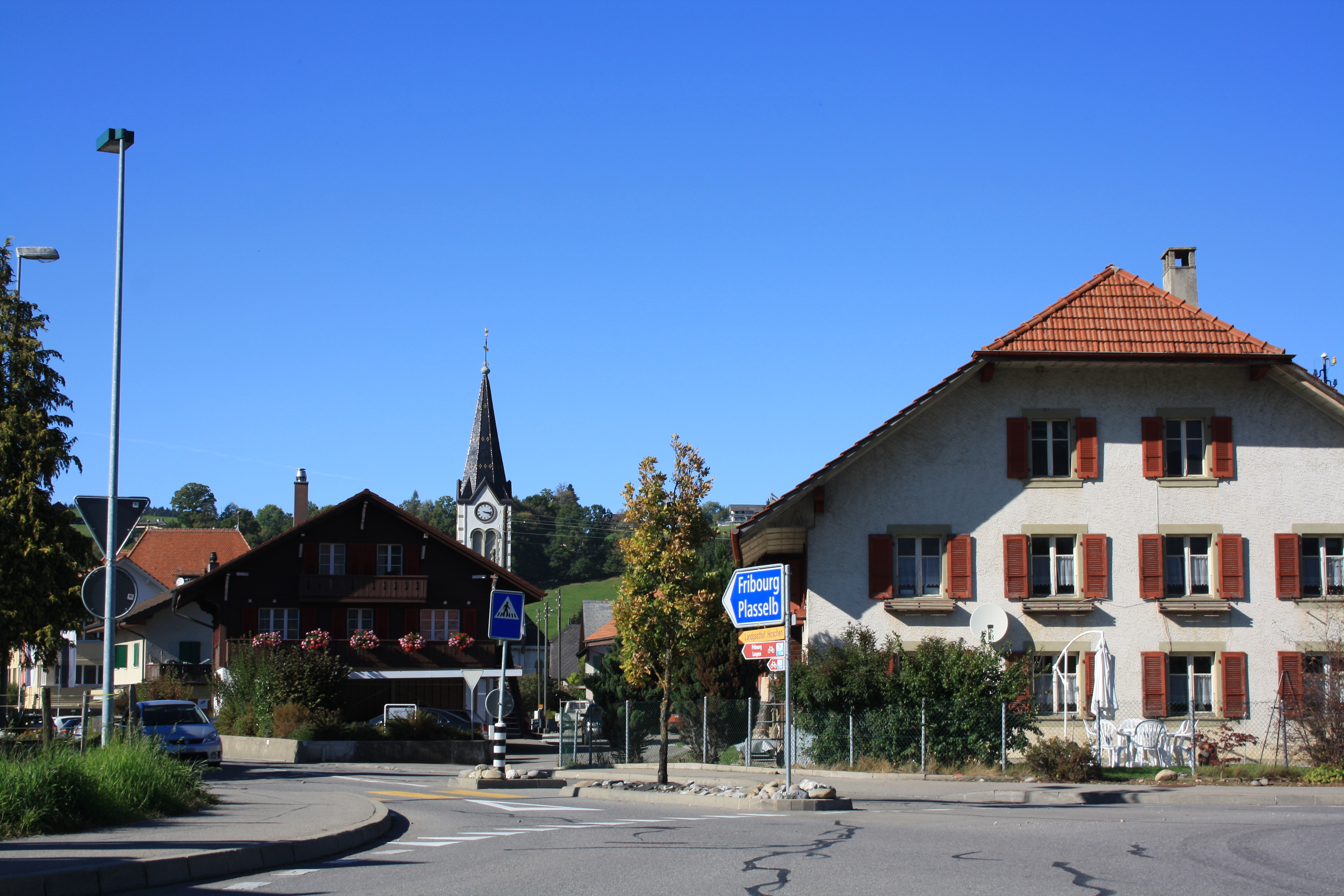
Plaffeien village

Plaffeien has a population (as of December 2020) of 3,613. As of 2008, 6.2% of the population are resident foreign nationals. Over the last 10 years (2000–2010) the population has changed at a rate of −3.5%. Migration accounted for −0.1%, while births and deaths accounted for −0.3%.

Most of the population (as of 2000) speaks German (1,774 or 91.5%) as their first language, Albanian is the second most common (76 or 3.9%) and French is the third (50 or 2.6%). There are 4 people who speak Italian and 1 person who speaks Romansh.

As of 2008, the population was 50.8% male and 49.2% female. The population was made up of 900 Swiss men (46.8% of the population) and 77 (4.0%) non-Swiss men. There were 893 Swiss women (46.5%) and 52 (2.7%) non-Swiss women. Of the population in the municipality, 899 or about 46.4% were born in Plaffeien and lived there in 2000. There were 588 or 30.3% who were born in the same canton, while 244 or 12.6% were born somewhere else in Switzerland, and 162 or 8.4% were born outside of Switzerland.

As of 2000, children and teenagers (0–19 years old) make up 25.4% of the population, while adults (20–64 years old) make up 60.7% and seniors (over 64 years old) make up 13.9%.

As of 2000, there were 852 people who were single and never married in the municipality. There were 875 married individuals, 123 widows or widowers and 88 individuals who are divorced.

As of 2000, there were 799 private households in the municipality, and an average of 2.4 persons per household. There were 275 households that consist of only one person and 60 households with five or more people. In 2000, a total of 773 apartments (66.2% of the total) were permanently occupied, while 319 apartments (27.3%) were seasonally occupied and 76 apartments (6.5%) were empty. As of 2009, the construction rate of new housing units was 4.2 new units per 1000 residents. The vacancy rate for the municipality, in 2010, was 0.56%.

The historical population is given in the following chart:

== Heritage sites of national significance ==
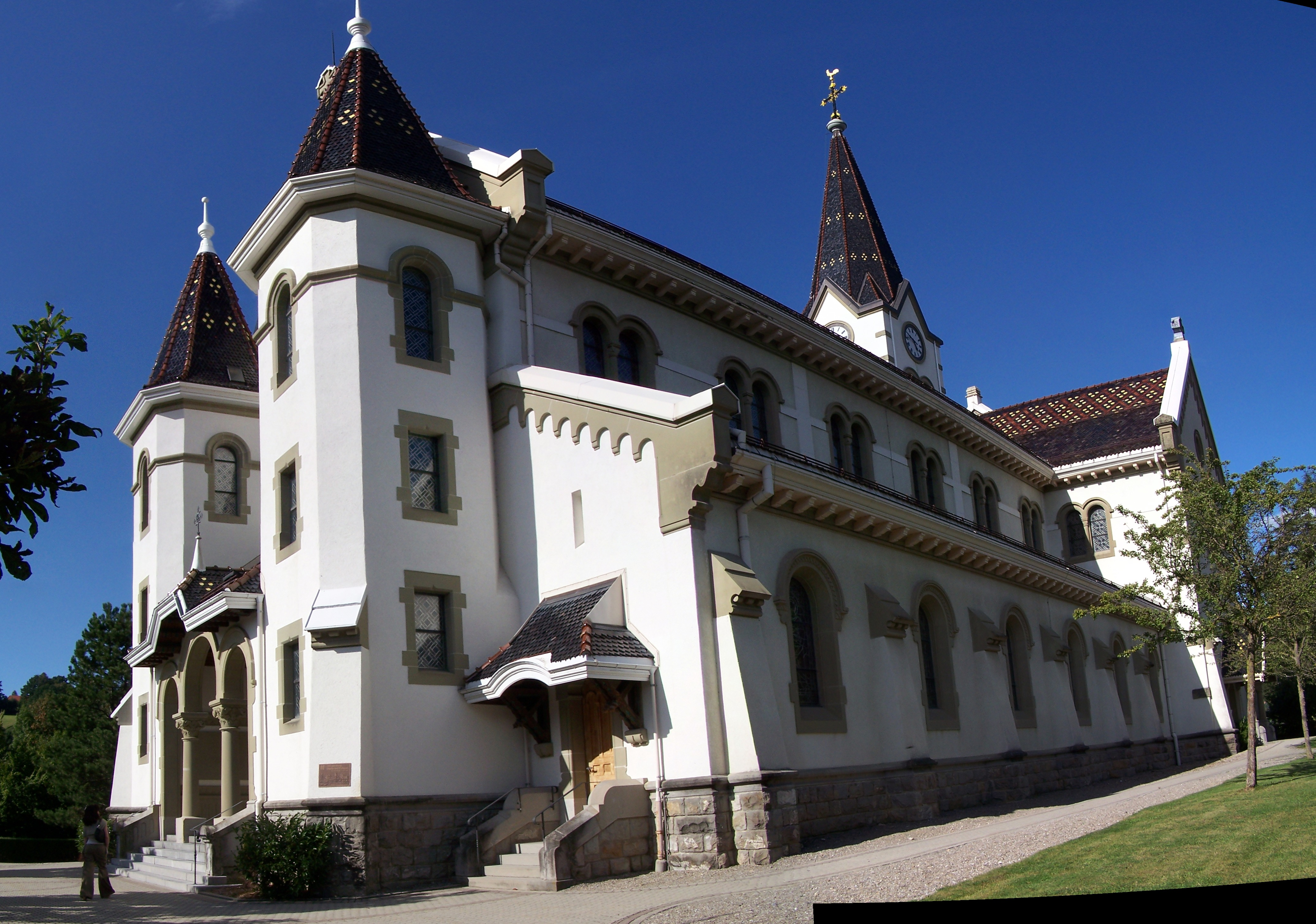
Maria Geburt parish church

The Maria Geburt parish church is listed as a Swiss heritage site of national significance. The entire village of Plaffeien is part of the Inventory of Swiss Heritage Sites.

== Twin Town ==
Plaffeien is twinned with the town of Kasterlee, Belgium.

== Politics ==
In the 2015 federal election the most popular party was the SVP with 48.3% of the vote. The next three most popular parties were the CVP (24.3%), the SP (11.4%) and the FDP (5.0%). In the federal election, a total of 644 votes were cast, and the voter turnout was 42.7%. The 2015 election saw a large change in the voting when compared to 2011. The percentage of the vote received by the CVP increased sharply from 18.5% in 2011 to 24.3% in 2015 and the SVP increased sharply from 36.3% in 2011 to 48.3% in 2015.

In the 2011 federal election the most popular party was the SVP which received 36.3% of the vote. The next three most popular parties were the CVP (18.5%), the SPS (12.1%) and the FDP (11.5%).

The SVP gained an additional 6.4% of the vote from the 2007 Federal election (30.0% in 2007 vs 36.3% in 2011). The CVP lost popularity (27.0% in 2007), the SPS moved from below fourth place in 2007 to third and the FDP retained about the same popularity (14.0% in 2007). A total of 597 votes were cast in this election, of which 6 or 1.0% were invalid.

== Economy ==
Plaffeien is an industrial-tertiary municipality, a municipality where agriculture and manufacturing play a minor role in the economy.

As of 2014, there were a total of 1,207 people employed in the municipality. Of these, a total of 112 people worked in 48 businesses in the primary economic sector. The secondary sector employed 380 workers in 28 separate businesses. A minority (16.3%) of the secondary sector employees worked in very small businesses. There were 7 small businesses with a total of 146 employees and one mid sized business with a total of 172 employees. Finally, the tertiary sector provided 715 jobs in 118 businesses. There were 15 small businesses with a total of 397 employees.

In 2014 a total of 5.1% of the population received social assistance.

In 2015 local hotels had a total of 18,465 overnight stays, of which 12.2% were international visitors.

In 2008 the total number of full-time equivalent jobs was 802. The number of jobs in the primary sector was 62, all of which were in agriculture. The number of jobs in the secondary sector was 289 of which 220 or (76.1%) were in manufacturing and 69 (23.9%) were in construction. The number of jobs in the tertiary sector was 451. In the tertiary sector; 159 or 35.3% were in wholesale or retail sales or the repair of motor vehicles, 43 or 9.5% were in the movement and storage of goods, 89 or 19.7% were in a hotel or restaurant, 1 was in the information industry, 16 or 3.5% were the insurance or financial industry, 25 or 5.5% were technical professionals or scientists, 50 or 11.1% were in education and 22 or 4.9% were in health care.

In 2000, there were 474 workers who commuted into the municipality and 491 workers who commuted away. The municipality is a net exporter of workers, with about 1.0 workers leaving the municipality for every one entering. Of the working population, 9% used public transportation to get to work, and 60.4% used a private car.

== Religion ==
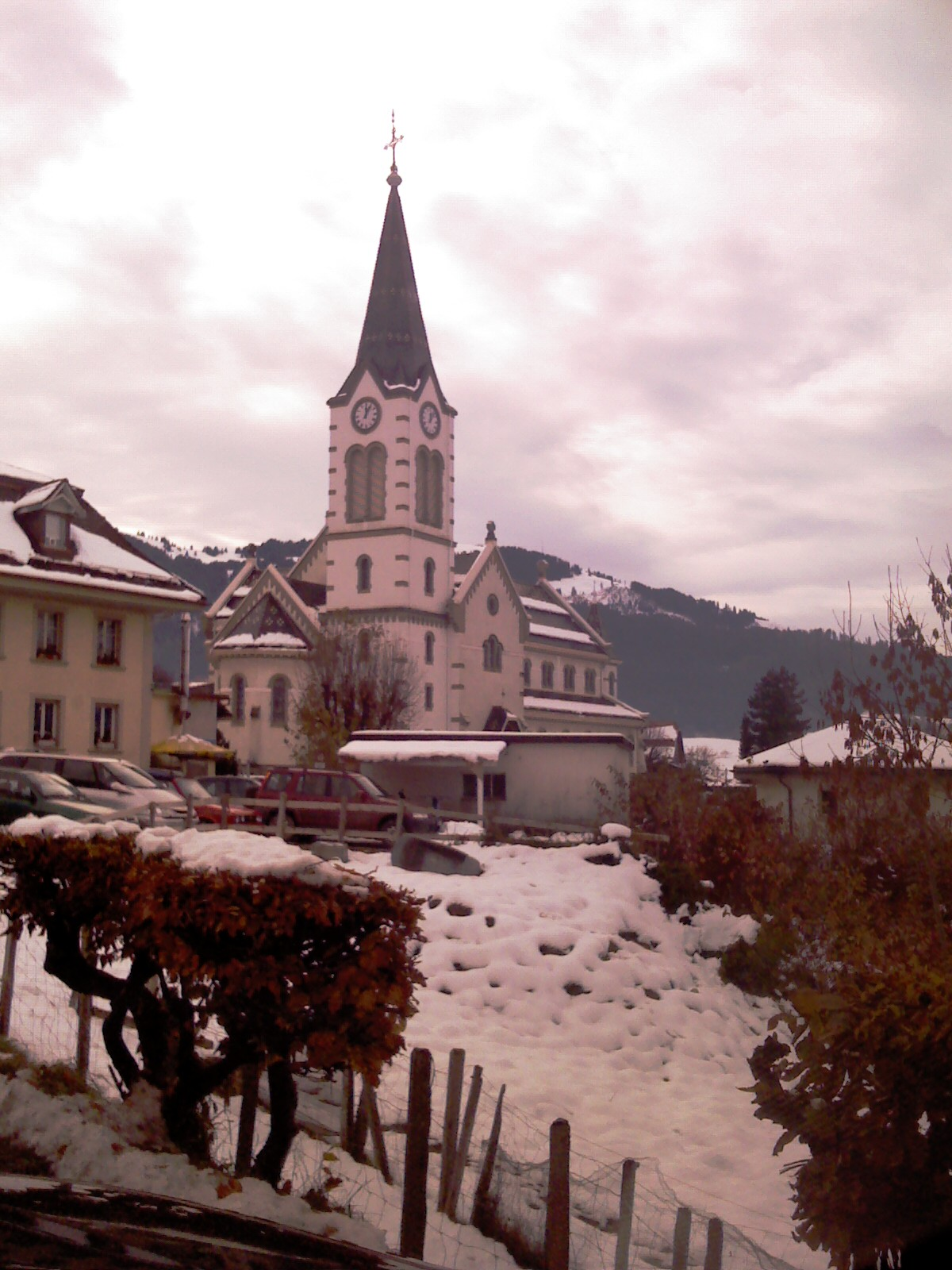
Plaffeien Roman Catholic church

From the 2000 census, 1,528 or 78.8% were Roman Catholic, while 167 or 8.6% belonged to the Swiss Reformed Church. Of the rest of the population, there were 13 members of an Orthodox church (or about 0.67% of the population), and there were 11 individuals (or about 0.57% of the population) who belonged to another Christian church. There were 84 (or about 4.33% of the population) who were Islamic. There were 2 individuals who belonged to another church. 81 (or about 4.18% of the population) belonged to no church, are agnostic or atheist, and 57 individuals (or about 2.94% of the population) did not answer the question.

== Climate ==
Plaffeien has an average of 128.3 days of rain or snow per year and on average receives 1,200 mm (47 in) of precipitation. The wettest month is August during which time Plaffeien receives an average of 147 mm (5.8 in) of rain or snow. During this month there is precipitation for an average of 11.9 days. The month with the most days of precipitation is May, with an average of 14.0, but with only 145 mm (5.7 in) of rain or snow. The driest month of the year is February with an average of 52 mm (2.0 in) of precipitation over 8.4 days.

Climate data for Plaffeien, elevation 1,042 m (3,419 ft), (1991–2020)
Month	Jan	Feb	Mar	Apr	May	Jun	Jul	Aug	Sep	Oct	Nov	Dec	Year
Mean daily maximum °C (°F)	2.4 (36.3)	3.0 (37.4)	6.8 (44.2)	10.6 (51.1)	14.7 (58.5)	18.5 (65.3)	20.6 (69.1)	20.2 (68.4)	15.6 (60.1)	11.4 (52.5)	6.2 (43.2)	3.5 (38.3)	11.1 (52.0)
Daily mean °C (°F)	−0.4 (31.3)	−0.2 (31.6)	3.1 (37.6)	6.4 (43.5)	10.4 (50.7)	14.1 (57.4)	16.1 (61.0)	15.9 (60.6)	11.8 (53.2)	8.0 (46.4)	3.3 (37.9)	0.5 (32.9)	7.4 (45.3)
Mean daily minimum °C (°F)	−3.3 (26.1)	−3.2 (26.2)	−0.3 (31.5)	2.6 (36.7)	6.3 (43.3)	10.0 (50.0)	11.9 (53.4)	11.9 (53.4)	8.4 (47.1)	4.9 (40.8)	0.5 (32.9)	−2.4 (27.7)	3.9 (39.0)
Average precipitation mm (inches)	54.3 (2.14)	52.1 (2.05)	66.1 (2.60)	87.3 (3.44)	145.2 (5.72)	138.0 (5.43)	144.4 (5.69)	147.4 (5.80)	110.6 (4.35)	103.9 (4.09)	75.1 (2.96)	75.3 (2.96)	1,199.7 (47.23)
Average precipitation days (≥ 1.0 mm)	9.0	8.4	9.7	10.7	14.0	12.5	11.7	11.9	9.7	10.5	9.6	10.6	128.3
Average relative humidity (%)	77	75	73	73	75	74	72	74	80	82	80	78	76
Mean monthly sunshine hours	96.5	112.4	151.2	166.7	180.3	209.4	233.9	219.1	167.0	126.6	90.6	83.8	1,837.5
Percentage possible sunshine	39	42	44	44	42	47	53	54	48	41	36	36	45
Source 1: NOAA
Source 2: MeteoSwiss

== Education ==
In Plaffeien about 586 or (30.2%) of the population have completed non-mandatory upper secondary education, and 125 or (6.4%) have completed additional higher education (either university or a Fachhochschule). Of the 125 who completed tertiary schooling, 72.0% were Swiss men, 19.2% were Swiss women, 8.0% were non-Swiss men.

The Canton of Fribourg school system provides one year of non-obligatory Kindergarten, followed by six years of Primary school. This is followed by three years of obligatory lower Secondary school where the students are separated according to ability and aptitude. Following the lower Secondary students may attend a three or four-year optional upper Secondary school. The upper Secondary school is divided into gymnasium (university preparatory) and vocational programs. After they finish the upper Secondary program, students may choose to attend a Tertiary school or continue their apprenticeship.

During the 2010–11 school year, there were a total of 659 students attending 38 classes in Plaffeien. A total of 283 students from the municipality attended any school, either in the municipality or outside of it. There were 3 kindergarten classes with a total of 57 students in the municipality. The municipality had 12 primary classes and 200 students. During the same year, there were 23 lower secondary classes with a total of 402 students. There were no upper Secondary classes or vocational classes, but there were 15 upper Secondary students and 46 upper Secondary vocational students who attended classes in another municipality. The municipality had no non-university Tertiary classes, but there was one non-university Tertiary student and one specialized Tertiary student who attended classes in another municipality.

As of 2000, there were 407 students in Plaffeien who came from another municipality, while 55 residents attended schools outside the municipality.

== Notable people ==
- Herbert Kolly (born 1969) is a former swiss freestyle skier
- Rudolf Marro (born 1953) is a former swiss wrestler
- Sibylle Matter (born 1973) is a former swiss athlete
- Leandro Zbinden (born 2002) Swiss footballer

== Crime ==
In 2014 the crime rate, of the over 200 crimes listed in the Swiss Criminal Code (running from murder, robbery and assault to accepting bribes and election fraud), in Plaffeien was 44.8 per thousand residents, which is about two-thirds the national rate. However, during the same period, the rate of drug crimes was 14.9 per thousand residents or about 50% greater than the national rate. The rate of violations of immigration, visa and work permit laws was 1.5 per thousand residents, which is less than one-third the national rate.
