= Zumholz =

- Former municipality
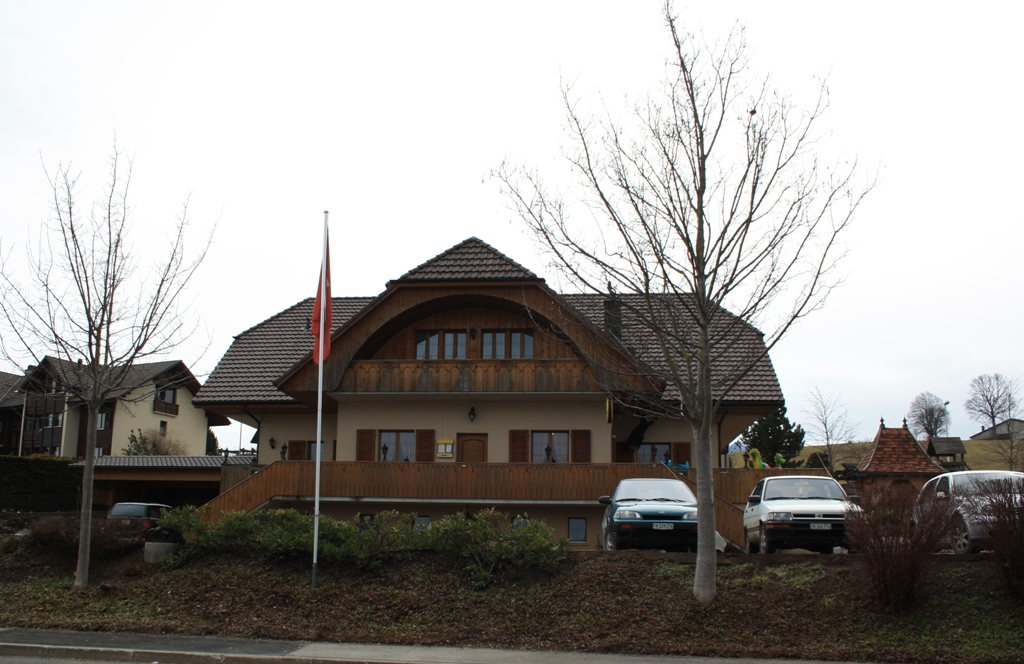
- Gasthof Laterne in Zumholz village

- Coat of arms
- Location of Zumholz
- Location within Switzerland Location within Canton of Fribourg
- Coordinates: 46°45′N 7°18′E
- Country: Switzerland
- Canton: Fribourg
- District: Sense

Government
  - Mayor: Gemeindeammann

Area
  - Total: 1.88 km^{2} (0.73 sq mi)
- Elevation: 867 m (2,844 ft)

Population (Dec 2015)
  - Total: 397
  - Density: 211/km^{2} (547/sq mi)
- Time zone: UTC+01:00 (CET)
  - Summer (DST): UTC+02:00 (CEST)
- Postal code: 1719
- SFOS number: 2310
- ISO 3166 code: CH-FR
- Surrounded by: Alterswil, Brünisried, Guggisberg (BE), Oberschrot, Plaffeien
- Website: www.zumholz.ch

Zumholz is a former municipality in the district of Sense in the canton of Fribourg in Switzerland. It is one of the municipalities with a large majority of German speakers in the mostly French speaking Canton of Fribourg. On 1 January 2017 the former municipalities of Zumholz and Oberschrot merged into the municipality of Plaffeien.

== Geography ==
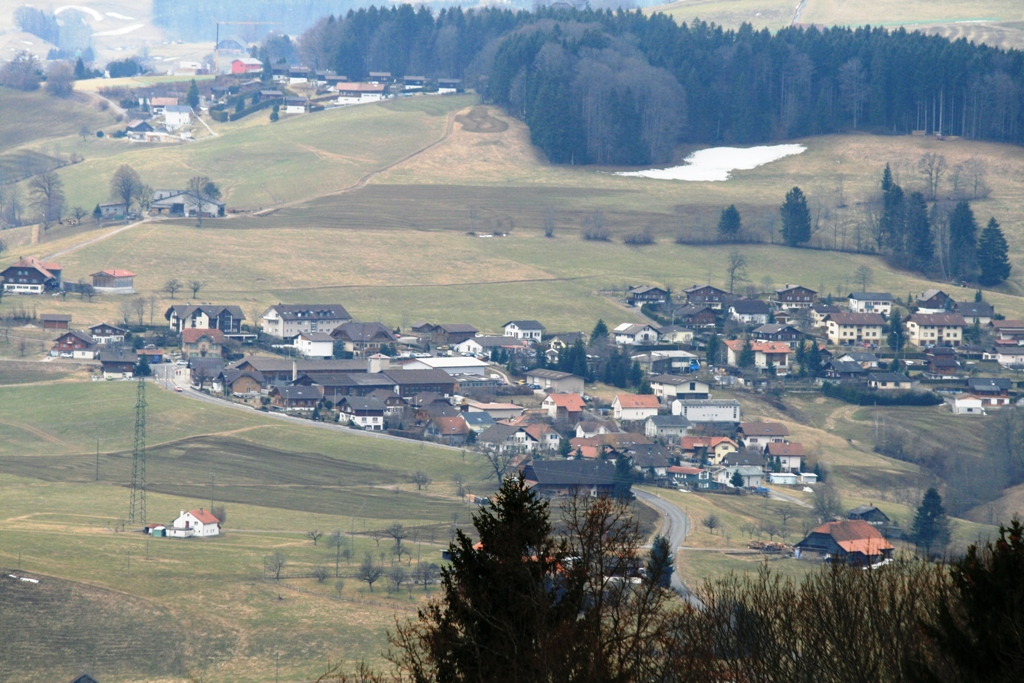
Zumholz village

Zumholz had an area, in 2009, of 1.88 km^{2} (0.73 sq mi). Of this area, 1.36 km^{2} (0.53 mi^{2}) or 72.0% is used for agricultural purposes, while 0.34 km^{2} (0.13 mi^{2}) or 18.0% is forested. Of the rest of the land, 0.15 km^{2} (37 acres) or 7.9% is settled (buildings or roads), 0.06 km^{2} (15 acres) or 3.2% is either rivers or lakes.

Of the built up area, housing and buildings made up 5.8% and transportation infrastructure made up 1.6%. Out of the forested land, 12.7% of the total land area is heavily forested and 5.3% is covered with orchards or small clusters of trees. Of the agricultural land, 6.3% is used for growing crops and 65.1% is pastures. All the water in the municipality is flowing water.

== Coat of arms ==
The blazon of the municipal coat of arms is Azure, a Fleur-de-lis Argent and in chief a Mullet of the same.

== Demographics ==
Zumholz had a population (as of 2015) of 397. As of 2008, 1.8% of the population are resident foreign nationals. Over the last 10 years (2000–2010) the population has changed at a rate of -0.5%. Migration accounted for -9.1%, while births and deaths accounted for 4.3%.

Most of the population (as of 2000) speaks German (447 or 97.4%) as their first language, French is the second most common (6 or 1.3%) and Italian is the third (3 or 0.7%).

As of 2008, the population was 51.7% male and 48.3% female. The population was made up of 217 Swiss men (50.6% of the population) and 5 (1.2%) non-Swiss men. There were 199 Swiss women (46.4%) and 8 (1.9%) non-Swiss women. Of the population in the municipality, 154 or about 33.6% were born in Zumholz and lived there in 2000. There were 203 or 44.2% who were born in the same canton, while 73 or 15.9% were born somewhere else in Switzerland, and 21 or 4.6% were born outside of Switzerland.

As of 2000, children and teenagers (0–19 years old) make up 33.3% of the population, while adults (20–64 years old) make up 59% and seniors (over 64 years old) make up 7.6%.

As of 2000, there were 232 people who were single and never married in the municipality. There were 195 married individuals, 15 widows or widowers and 17 individuals who are divorced.

As of 2000, there were 160 private households in the municipality, and an average of 2.8 persons per household. There were 39 households that consist of only one person and 22 households with five or more people. In 2000, a total of 156 apartments (94.0% of the total) were permanently occupied, while 7 apartments (4.2%) were seasonally occupied and 3 apartments (1.8%) were empty. The vacancy rate for the municipality, in 2010, was 1.16%.

The historical population is given in the following chart:

== Politics ==
In the 2011 federal election the most popular party was the SVP which received 28.3% of the vote. The next three most popular parties were the CVP (19.2%), the FDP (13.0%) and the CSP (10.6%).

The SVP lost about 9.9% of the vote when compared to the 2007 Federal election (38.2% in 2007 vs 28.3% in 2011). The CVP retained about the same popularity (20.7% in 2007), the FDP retained about the same popularity (14.5% in 2007) and the CSP retained about the same popularity (12.6% in 2007). A total of 149 votes were cast in this election, of which 2 or 1.3% were invalid.

== Economy ==
As of 2010, Zumholz had an unemployment rate of 2%. As of 2008, there were 21 people employed in the primary economic sector and about 9 businesses involved in this sector. 29 people were employed in the secondary sector and there were 3 businesses in this sector. 45 people were employed in the tertiary sector, with 13 businesses in this sector. There were 227 residents of the municipality who were employed in some capacity, of which females made up 41.0% of the workforce.

In 2008 the total number of full-time equivalent jobs was 73. The number of jobs in the primary sector was 12, all of which were in agriculture. The number of jobs in the secondary sector was 26 of which 15 or (57.7%) were in manufacturing and 11 (42.3%) were in construction. The number of jobs in the tertiary sector was 35. In the tertiary sector; 10 or 28.6% were in wholesale or retail sales or the repair of motor vehicles, 1 was in the movement and storage of goods, 4 or 11.4% were in a hotel or restaurant, 1 was in the information industry, 10 or 28.6% were technical professionals or scientists, and 5 or 14.3% were in health care.

In 2000, there were 34 workers who commuted into the municipality and 186 workers who commuted away. The municipality is a net exporter of workers, with about 5.5 workers leaving the municipality for every one entering. Of the working population, 7.9% used public transportation to get to work, and 72.2% used a private car.

== Religion ==
From the 2000 census, 349 or 76.0% were Roman Catholic, while 68 or 14.8% belonged to the Swiss Reformed Church. Of the rest of the population, there were 10 individuals (or about 2.18% of the population) who belonged to another Christian church. There were 9 (or about 1.96% of the population) who were Islamic. 20 (or about 4.36% of the population) belonged to no church, are agnostic or atheist, and 8 individuals (or about 1.74% of the population) did not answer the question.

== Education ==
In Zumholz about 144 or (31.4%) of the population have completed non-mandatory upper secondary education, and 30 or (6.5%) have completed additional higher education (either university or a Fachhochschule). Of the 30 who completed tertiary schooling, 80.0% were Swiss men, 16.7% were Swiss women.

The Canton of Fribourg school system provides one 2 years mandatory Kindergarten, followed by six years of Primary school. This is followed by three years of obligatory lower Secondary school where the students are separated according to ability and aptitude. Following the lower Secondary students may attend a three or four year optional upper Secondary school. The upper Secondary school is divided into gymnasium (university preparatory) and vocational programs. After they finish the upper Secondary program, students may choose to attend a Tertiary school or continue their apprenticeship.

During the 2010–11 school year, there were no students attending school in Zumholz, but a total of 82 students attended school in other municipalities. Of these students, 10 were in kindergarten, 28 were in a primary school, 20 were in a mandatory secondary school, 10 were in an upper secondary school and 13 were in a vocational secondary program. There was one tertiary student from the municipality.

As of 2000, there were 93 students from Zumholz who attended schools outside the municipality.
