= Ueberstorf =

- Municipality
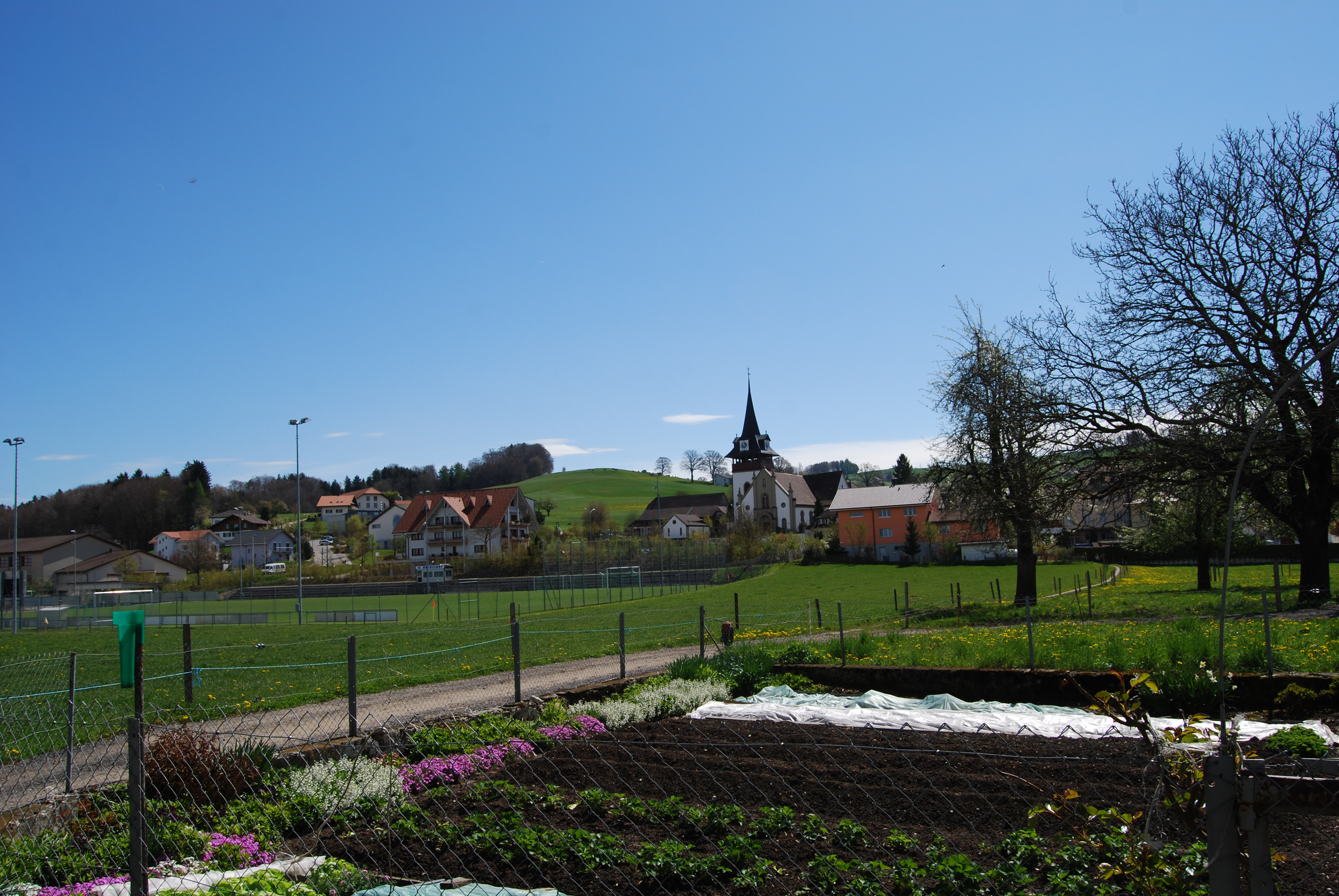

- Coat of arms
- Location of Ueberstorf
- Location within Switzerland Location within Canton of Fribourg
- Coordinates: 46°52′N 7°19′E
- Country: Switzerland
- Canton: Fribourg
- District: Sense

Government
  - Mayor: Gemeindeammann

Area
  - Total: 16.13 km^{2} (6.23 sq mi)
- Elevation: 658 m (2,159 ft)

Population (December 2020)
  - Total: 2,382
  - Density: 147.7/km^{2} (382.5/sq mi)
- Time zone: UTC+01:00 (CET)
  - Summer (DST): UTC+02:00 (CEST)
- Postal code: 3182
- SFOS number: 2308
- ISO 3166 code: CH-FR
- Surrounded by: Albligen (BE), Heitenried, Köniz (BE), Neuenegg (BE), Sankt Antoni, Wahlern (BE), Wünnewil-Flamatt
- Website: www.ueberstorf.ch

Ueberstorf is a municipality in the district of Sense in the canton of Fribourg, Switzerland. It is one of the municipalities with a large majority of German speaking people in the mostly French speaking Canton of Fribourg.

== History ==
Ueberstorf is first mentioned in 1226 as Jeberinsdorf. In 1228 it was mentioned as Ibristorf.

== Geography ==
Ueberstorf has an area of 16.11 km^{2} (6.22 sq mi). Of this area, 11.73 km^{2} (4.53 mi^{2}) or 72.8% is used for agricultural purposes, while 2.99 km^{2} (1.15 mi^{2}) or 18.5% is forested. Of the rest of the land, 1.2 km^{2} (0.46 mi^{2}) or 7.4% is settled (buildings or roads), 0.19 km^{2} (0.073 mi^{2}) or 1.2% is either rivers or lakes and 0.02 km^{2} (4.9 acres) or 0.1% is unproductive land.

Of the built up area, housing and buildings made up 4.9% and transportation infrastructure made up 1.9%. Out of the forested land, 16.9% of the total land area is heavily forested and 1.7% is covered with orchards or small clusters of trees. Of the agricultural land, 45.5% is used for growing crops and 26.2% is pastures, while 1.1% is used for orchards or vine crops. All the water in the municipality is flowing water.

The municipality is located in the Sense district, in the north-eastern corner of the canton and two-thirds of the municipality is bordered by the Canton of Bern. It is located on the Flamatt-Schwarzenburg road and consists of two village centers and a settlement around the church as well as numerous small hamlets.

== Coat of arms ==
The blazon of the municipal coat of arms is Paly of Six Argent and Azure a Lion rampant Gules.

== Demographics ==
Ueberstorf has a population (as of December 2020) of 2,382. As of 2008, 2.7% of the population are resident foreign nationals. Over the last 10 years (2000–2010) the population has changed at a rate of 8.6%. Migration accounted for 2.1%, while births and deaths accounted for 4.5%.

Most of the population (as of 2000) speaks German (2,054 or 97.1%) as their first language, French is the second most common (19 or 0.9%) and Swedish is the third (6 or 0.3%). There are 5 people who speak Italian and 3 people who speak Romansh.

As of 2008, the population was 50.3% male and 49.7% female. The population was made up of 1,128 Swiss men (48.5% of the population) and 43 (1.8%) non-Swiss men. There were 1,120 Swiss women (48.1%) and 36 (1.5%) non-Swiss women. Of the population in the municipality, 1,030 or about 48.7% were born in Ueberstorf and lived there in 2000. There were 312 or 14.8% who were born in the same canton, while 625 or 29.6% were born somewhere else in Switzerland, and 86 or 4.1% were born outside of Switzerland.

As of 2000, children and teenagers (0–19 years old) make up 23.9% of the population, while adults (20–64 years old) make up 64.2% and seniors (over 64 years old) make up 11.9%.

As of 2000, there were 892 people who were single and never married in the municipality. There were 1,039 married individuals, 112 widows or widowers and 72 individuals who are divorced.

As of 2000, there were 833 private households in the municipality, and an average of 2.5 persons per household. There were 207 households that consist of only one person and 69 households with five or more people. In 2000, a total of 804 apartments (92.4% of the total) were permanently occupied, while 47 apartments (5.4%) were seasonally occupied and 19 apartments (2.2%) were empty. As of 2009, the construction rate of new housing units was 2.6 new units per 1000 residents. The vacancy rate for the municipality, in 2010, was 1.11%.

The historical population is given in the following chart:

== Politics ==
In the 2011 federal election the most popular party was the CVP which received 40.2% of the vote. The next three most popular parties were the SVP (17.9%), the SPS (12.3%) and the CSP (7.9%).

The CVP received about the same percentage of the vote as they did in the 2007 Federal election (44.6% in 2007 vs 40.2% in 2011). The SVP retained about the same popularity (15.7% in 2007), the SPS moved from fourth in 2007 (with 9.9%) to third and the CSP moved from third in 2007 (with 12.3%) to fourth. A total of 1,039 votes were cast in this election, of which 9 or 0.9% were invalid.

== Economy ==
As of 2010, Ueberstorf had an unemployment rate of 1.4%. As of 2008, there were 150 people employed in the primary economic sector and about 63 businesses involved in this sector. 108 people were employed in the secondary sector and there were 24 businesses in this sector. 185 people were employed in the tertiary sector, with 46 businesses in this sector. There were 1,199 residents of the municipality who were employed in some capacity, of which females made up 41.5% of the workforce.

In 2008 the total number of full-time equivalent jobs was 327. The number of jobs in the primary sector was 96, all of which were in agriculture. The number of jobs in the secondary sector was 97 of which 30 or (30.9%) were in manufacturing and 67 (69.1%) were in construction. The number of jobs in the tertiary sector was 134. In the tertiary sector; 45 or 33.6% were in wholesale or retail sales or the repair of motor vehicles, 9 or 6.7% were in the movement and storage of goods, 18 or 13.4% were in a hotel or restaurant, 1 was in the information industry, 12 or 9.0% were the insurance or financial industry, 7 or 5.2% were technical professionals or scientists, 12 or 9.0% were in education and 3 or 2.2% were in health care.

In 2000, there were 103 workers who commuted into the municipality and 901 workers who commuted away. The municipality is a net exporter of workers, with about 8.7 workers leaving the municipality for every one entering. Of the working population, 18.9% used public transportation to get to work, and 60.5% used a private car.

== Religion ==
From the 2000 census, 1,281 or 60.6% were Roman Catholic, while 641 or 30.3% belonged to the Swiss Reformed Church. Of the rest of the population, there was 1 member of an Orthodox church, there were 3 individuals (or about 0.14% of the population) who belonged to the Christian Catholic Church, and there were 71 individuals (or about 3.36% of the population) who belonged to another Christian church. There were 2 (or about 0.09% of the population) who were Islamic. There were 4 individuals who were Buddhist. 92 (or about 4.35% of the population) belonged to no church, are agnostic or atheist, and 55 individuals (or about 2.60% of the population) did not answer the question.

== Education ==
In Ueberstorf about 854 or (40.4%) of the population have completed non-mandatory upper secondary education, and 251 or (11.9%) have completed additional higher education (either university or a Fachhochschule). Of the 251 who completed tertiary schooling, 75.7% were Swiss men, 19.5% were Swiss women, 3.2% were non-Swiss men.

The Canton of Fribourg school system provides one year of non-obligatory Kindergarten, followed by six years of Primary school. This is followed by three years of obligatory lower Secondary school where the students are separated according to ability and aptitude. Following the lower Secondary students may attend a three or four year optional upper Secondary school. The upper Secondary school is divided into gymnasium (university preparatory) and vocational programs. After they finish the upper Secondary program, students may choose to attend a Tertiary school or continue their apprenticeship.

During the 2010-11 school year, there were a total of 221 students attending 12 classes in Ueberstorf. A total of 354 students from the municipality attended any school, either in the municipality or outside of it. There were 3 kindergarten classes with a total of 58 students in the municipality. The municipality had 9 primary classes and 163 students. During the same year, there were no lower secondary classes in the municipality, but 76 students attended lower secondary school in a neighboring municipality. There were no upper Secondary classes or vocational classes, but there were 20 upper Secondary students and 32 upper Secondary vocational students who attended classes in another municipality. The municipality had no non-university Tertiary classes, but there were 2 non-university Tertiary students and 3 specialized Tertiary students who attended classes in another municipality.

As of 2000, there were 12 students in Ueberstorf who came from another municipality, while 110 residents attended schools outside the municipality.
