= Albligen =

- Former municipality
- Flag Coat of arms
- Location of Albligen
- Location within Switzerland Location within Canton of Bern
- Coordinates: 46°51′N 7°19′E
- Country: Switzerland
- Canton: Bern
- District: Bern-Mittelland

Government
  - Mayor: Regula Reinhardt-Trachsel

Area
  - Total: 4.3 km^{2} (1.7 sq mi)
- Elevation: 699 m (2,293 ft)

Population (31 December 2010)
  - Total: 477
  - Density: 110/km^{2} (290/sq mi)
- Time zone: UTC+01:00 (CET)
  - Summer (DST): UTC+02:00 (CEST)
- Postal code: 3183
- SFOS number: 851
- ISO 3166 code: CH-BE
- Surrounded by: Ueberstorf, Wahlern, Heitenried
- Website: www.albligen.ch

Albligen (former French name: Albenon) is a former municipality in the Bern-Mittelland administrative district in the canton of Bern in Switzerland. On 1 January 2011, the former municipalities of Wahlern and Albligen merged into the new municipality of Schwarzenburg.

== History ==
Albligen is first mentioned in 1346 as Alblingen.

== Geography ==
Albligen has an area, as of 2009, of 4.29 km^{2} (1.66 sq mi). Of this area, 2.41 km^{2} (0.93 sq mi) or 56.2% is used for agricultural purposes, while1.49 km^{2} (0.58 sq mi) or 34.7% is forested. Of the rest of the land, 0.32 km^{2} (0.12 sq mi) or 7.5% is settled (buildings or roads), 0.06 km^{2} (15 acres) or 1.4% is either rivers or lakes.

Of the built up area, industrial buildings made up 0.0% of the total area while housing and buildings made up 4.9% and transportation infrastructure made up 2.3%. 32.6% of the total land area is heavily forested and 2.1% is covered with orchards or small clusters of trees. Of the agricultural land, 26.6% is used for growing crops and 27.7% is pastures, while 1.9% is used for orchards or vine crops. All the water in the municipality is in rivers and streams.

Albligen lies in the midland of a small bank in the Höchi hills (818 m (2,684 ft) above sea level). On the eastern edge of the municipality flows the Sense River.

The neighboring municipalities are Ueberstorf, Wahlern, and Heitenried.

== Demographics ==
Albligen has a population (as of 31 December 2010) of 477. As of 2007, 3.2% of the population was made up of foreign nationals. Over the last 10 years the population has decreased at a rate of -5.7%. Most of the population (as of 2000) speaks German (97.5%), with French being second most common ( 1.4%) and Romanian being third ( 0.4%).

In the 2007 election the most popular party was the SVP which received 50% of the vote. The next three most popular parties were the SPS (19.3%), the Green Party (9.6%) and the local small left-wing parties (7.8%).

The age distribution of the population (as of 2000) is children and teenagers (0–19 years old) make up 26.5% of the population, while adults (20–64 years old) make up 60.5% and seniors (over 64 years old) make up 13%. In Albligen about 74.4% of the population (between age 25–64) have completed either non-mandatory upper secondary education or additional higher education (either University or a Fachhochschule).

Albligen has an unemployment rate of 0.75%. As of 2005, there were 59 people employed in the primary economic sector and about 20 businesses involved in this sector. 16 people are employed in the secondary sector and there are 7 businesses in this sector. 27 people are employed in the tertiary sector, with 10 businesses in this sector. The historical population is given in the following table:

year	population
1850	694
1960	421
1990	442
