= St. Antoni =

- Former municipality
- Coat of arms
- Location of St. Antoni
- Location within Switzerland Location within Canton of Fribourg
- Coordinates: 46°49′N 7°16′E
- Country: Switzerland
- Canton: Fribourg
- District: Sense

Government
  - Mayor: Gemeindeammann

Area
  - Total: 16.86 km^{2} (6.51 sq mi)
- Elevation: 715 m (2,346 ft)

Population (December 2019)
  - Total: 2,079
  - Density: 123.3/km^{2} (319.4/sq mi)
- Time zone: UTC+01:00 (CET)
  - Summer (DST): UTC+02:00 (CEST)
- Postal code: 1713
- SFOS number: 2302
- ISO 3166 code: CH-FR
- Surrounded by: Alterswil, Heitenried, Schmitten, Tafers, Ueberstorf, Wahlern (BE), Wünnewil-Flamatt
- Website: www.stantoni.ch

St. Antoni (French: Saint-Antoine; Arpitan: Sent-Antèno [ʃɛ̃t ɑ̃ˈteno]) is a former municipality in the district of Sense in the canton of Fribourg in Switzerland. It is one of the municipalities with a large majority of German speakers in the mostly French speaking Canton of Fribourg. On 1 January 2021 the former municipalities of St. Antoni and Alterswil merged into the municipality of Tafers.

== History ==
St. Antoni is first mentioned in 1690 as S Antonii.

== Geography ==
St. Antoni had an area of 16.79 km^{2} (6.48 sq mi). Of this area, 12.2 km^{2} (4.7 mi^{2}) or 72.7% is used for agricultural purposes, while 3.2 km^{2} (1.2 mi^{2}) or 19.1% is forested. Of the rest of the land, 1.26 km^{2} (0.49 mi^{2}) or 7.5% is settled (buildings or roads), 0.18 km^{2} (0.069 mi^{2}) or 1.1% is either rivers or lakes and 0.01 km^{2} (2.5 acres) or 0.1% is unproductive land.

Of the built up area, housing and buildings made up 4.6% and transportation infrastructure made up 2.2%. Out of the forested land, 17.2% of the total land area is heavily forested and 1.8% is covered with orchards or small clusters of trees. Of the agricultural land, 38.2% is used for growing crops and 33.4% is pastures. All the water in the municipality is flowing water.

The former municipality is located in the Sense district. It consists of the village of St. Antoni and the hamlets of Bächlisbrunnen, Burg, Burgbühl, Guglenberg, Henzenried, Lampertshalden, Lehwil, Mellisried, Ober- and Niedermonten, Niedermuhren, Schwenny, Tutzishaus, Weissenbach and Winterlingen.

== Coat of arms ==
The blazon of the municipal coat of arms is Per fess Or a Tau Cross issuant with two Bells Sable and Azure three Annulets Argent. The Tau cross is a symbol of the hermit St. Antoni.

== Demographics ==
St. Antoni had a population (as of 2019) of 2,079. As of 2008, 3.1% of the population are resident foreign nationals. Over the last 10 years (2000–2010) the population has changed at a rate of 3.1%. Migration accounted for 0.3%, while births and deaths accounted for 1.5%.

Most of the population (as of 2000) speaks German (1,843 or 95.8%) as their first language, French is the second most common (30 or 1.6%) and Albanian is the third (18 or 0.9%). There are 6 people who speak Italian.

As of 2008, the population was 50.9% male and 49.1% female. The population was made up of 944 Swiss men (48.9% of the population) and 38 (2.0%) non-Swiss men. There were 921 Swiss women (47.7%) and 28 (1.5%) non-Swiss women. Of the population in the municipality, 873 or about 45.4% were born in St. Antoni and lived there in 2000. There were 622 or 32.3% who were born in the same canton, while 288 or 15.0% were born somewhere else in Switzerland, and 82 or 4.3% were born outside of Switzerland.

As of 2000, children and teenagers (0–19 years old) make up 25.4% of the population, while adults (20–64 years old) make up 64.7% and seniors (over 64 years old) make up 9.9%.

As of 2000, there were 858 people who were single and never married in the municipality. There were 934 married individuals, 93 widows or widowers and 39 individuals who are divorced.

As of 2000, there were 695 private households in the municipality, and an average of 2.7 persons per household. There were 150 households that consist of only one person and 92 households with five or more people. In 2000, a total of 663 apartments (91.2% of the total) were permanently occupied, while 54 apartments (7.4%) were seasonally occupied and 10 apartments (1.4%) were empty. As of 2009, the construction rate of new housing units was 3.1 new units per 1000 residents. The vacancy rate for the municipality, in 2010, was 0.87%.

The historical population is given in the following chart:

== Politics ==
In the 2011 federal election the most popular party was the SVP which received 26.0% of the vote. The next three most popular parties were the CVP (25.4%), the SPS (13.6%) and the CSP (11.5%).

The SVP improved their position in St. Antoni rising to first, from second in 2007 (with 18.8%) The CVP moved from first in 2007 (with 30.9%) to second in 2011, the SPS moved from below fourth place in 2007 to third and the CSP moved from third in 2007 (with 17.9%) to fourth. A total of 813 votes were cast in this election, of which 8 or 1.0% were invalid.

== Economy ==
As of 2010, St. Antoni had an unemployment rate of 1.5%. As of 2008, there were 171 people employed in the primary economic sector and about 66 businesses involved in this sector. 150 people were employed in the secondary sector and there were 18 businesses in this sector. 240 people were employed in the tertiary sector, with 46 businesses in this sector. There were 1,083 residents of the municipality who were employed in some capacity, of which females made up 39.5% of the workforce.

In 2008 the total number of full-time equivalent jobs was 436. The number of jobs in the primary sector was 124, all of which were in agriculture. The number of jobs in the secondary sector was 136 of which 97 or (71.3%) were in manufacturing and 39 (28.7%) were in construction. The number of jobs in the tertiary sector was 176. In the tertiary sector; 51 or 29.0% were in wholesale or retail sales or the repair of motor vehicles, 25 or 14.2% were in the movement and storage of goods, 17 or 9.7% were in a hotel or restaurant, 6 or 3.4% were in the information industry, 14 or 8.0% were the insurance or financial industry, 23 or 13.1% were technical professionals or scientists, 13 or 7.4% were in education and 3 or 1.7% were in health care.

In 2000, there were 170 workers who commuted into the municipality and 757 workers who commuted away. The municipality is a net exporter of workers, with about 4.5 workers leaving the municipality for every one entering. Of the working population, 9.2% used public transportation to get to work, and 64.5% used a private car.

== Religion ==
From the 2000 census, 1,452 or 75.5% were Roman Catholic, while 331 or 17.2% belonged to the Swiss Reformed Church. Of the rest of the population, there were 14 members of an Orthodox church (or about 0.73% of the population), and there were 10 individuals (or about 0.52% of the population) who belonged to another Christian church. There was 1 individual who was Jewish, and 18 (or about 0.94% of the population) who were Islamic. There were 7 individuals who were Buddhist. 57 (or about 2.96% of the population) belonged to no church, are agnostic or atheist, and 39 individuals (or about 2.03% of the population) did not answer the question.

== Education ==
In St. Antoni about 678 or (35.2%) of the population have completed non-mandatory upper secondary education, and 202 or (10.5%) have completed additional higher education (either university or a Fachhochschule). Of the 202 who completed tertiary schooling, 75.2% were Swiss men, 18.8% were Swiss women, 3.5% were non-Swiss men and 2.5% were non-Swiss women.

The Canton of Fribourg school system provides one year of non-obligatory Kindergarten, followed by six years of Primary school. This is followed by three years of obligatory lower Secondary school where the students are separated according to ability and aptitude. Following the lower Secondary students may attend a three or four year optional upper Secondary school. The upper Secondary school is divided into gymnasium (university preparatory) and vocational programs. After they finish the upper Secondary program, students may choose to attend a Tertiary school or continue their apprenticeship.

During the 2010-11 school year, there were a total of 130 students attending 8 classes in St. Antoni. A total of 266 students from the municipality attended any school, either in the municipality or outside of it. There were 2 kindergarten classes with a total of 30 students in the municipality. The municipality had 6 primary classes and 100 students. During the same year, there were no lower secondary classes in the municipality, but 55 students attended lower secondary school in a neighboring municipality. There were no upper Secondary classes or vocational classes, but there were 22 upper Secondary students and 30 upper Secondary vocational students who attended classes in another municipality. The municipality had no non-university Tertiary classes.

As of 2000, there were 9 students in St. Antoni who came from another municipality, while 194 residents attended schools outside the municipality.
