= Oberbalm =

- Municipality
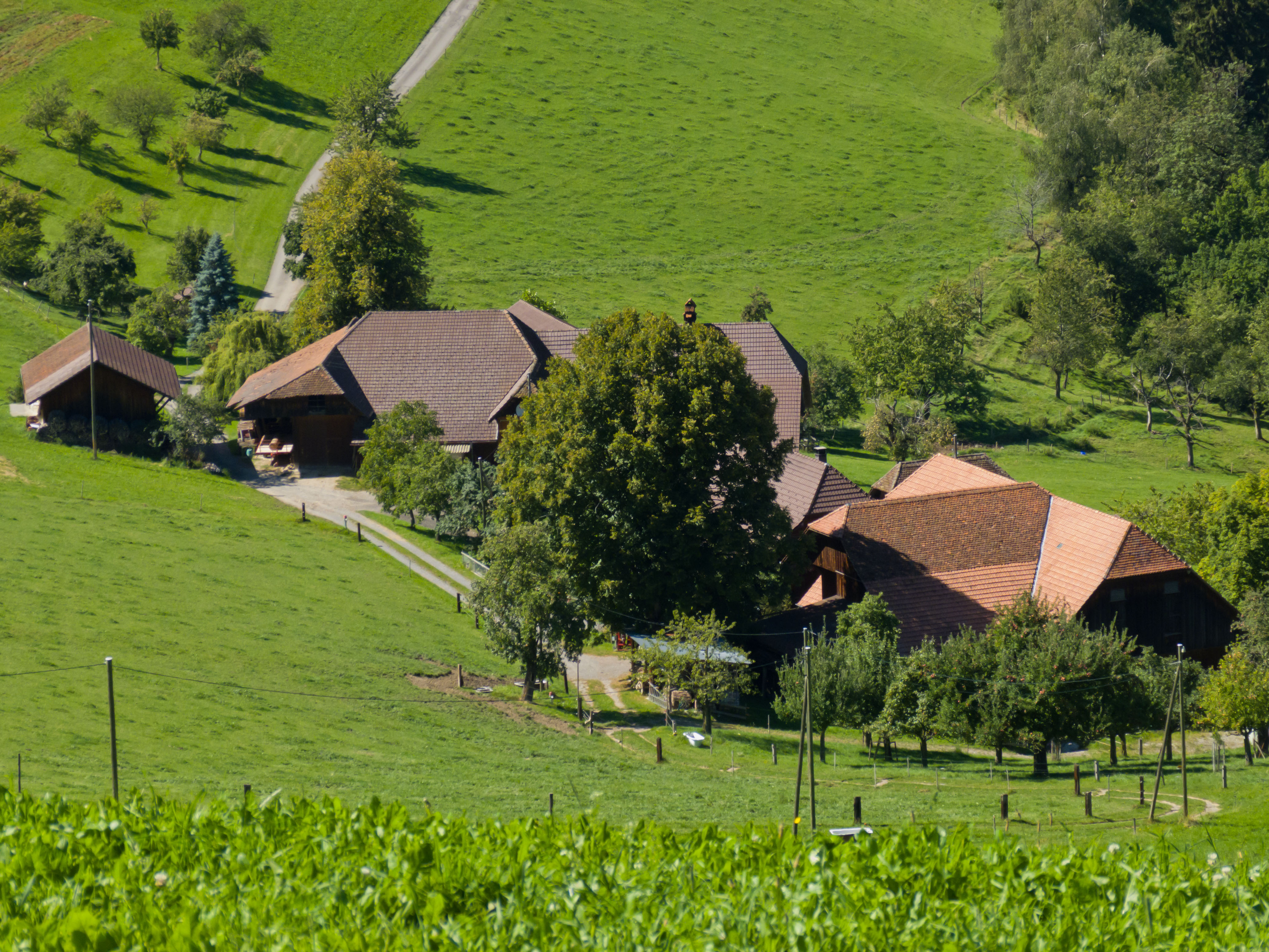

- Flag Coat of arms
- Location of Oberbalm
- Location within Switzerland Location within Canton of Bern
- Coordinates: 46°52′N 7°24′E
- Country: Switzerland
- Canton: Bern
- District: Bern-Mittelland

Government
  - Executive: Gemeinderat with 7 members
  - Mayor: Gemeindepräsident(in); Rudolf Anken (as of 2026)

Area
  - Total: 12.40 km^{2} (4.79 sq mi)
- Elevation: 821 m (2,694 ft)

Population (December 2020)
  - Total: 866
  - Density: 69.8/km^{2} (181/sq mi)
- Time zone: UTC+01:00 (CET)
  - Summer (DST): UTC+02:00 (CEST)
- Postal code: 3096
- SFOS number: 357
- ISO 3166 code: CH-BE
- Localities: Borisried
- Surrounded by: Köniz, Niedermuhlern, Rüeggisberg, Wahlern, Wald
- Website: https://www.oberbalm.ch/

Oberbalm, is a municipality in the Bern-Mittelland administrative district in the canton of Bern in Switzerland.

== History ==
Oberbalm is first mentioned in 1228 as Balmes. The village grew up around a medieval pilgrimage site. It was part of the lands of the counts of Laupen-Sternberg, who lived in a castle near Oberbalm above the Scherliau river. In 1388, Bern acquired rights over the region, and Oberbalm became part of the Bernese court of Sternberg. It remained a part of Sternberg until 1803 when it became part of the Oberamt of Bern. In 1831 the Oberamt was dissolved and Oberbalm was transferred to the successor Amtsbezirk of Bern.

The counts founded and supported the village church of St. Sulpitius, which was built before 1215 and first mentioned in 1228 in the Lausanne Chartular. Portions of the original romanesque building are still visible in the nave. The murals were painted in 1480 while the tower and choir were built between 1517 and 1527. Pilgrimages to Oberbalm to see the relics of St. Sulpitius became so profitable that in 1462, the Bernese City Council voted to move them to the new Cathedral of Bern. During the Protestant Reformation the village converted to the new religion and in 1528 the village church was placed under the authority of the city of Bern.

Until the 20th century, the village of Oberbalm was only barely larger than the surrounding hamlets. In 1838, there were only 19 houses in the village proper, while the surrounding hamlets had a total of 114. The village was the center of the surrounding communities because it had a church, a schoolhouse, a blacksmith and a tavern. However, during the 20th century, the village of Oberbalm grew as commuters moved from Bern and settled in the village.

== Geography ==
Oberbalm has an area of 12.39 km^{2} (4.78 sq mi). Of this area, 9.18 km^{2} (3.54 mi^{2}) or 74.0% is used for agricultural purposes, while 2.58 km^{2} (1.00 mi^{2}) or 20.8% is forested. Of the rest of the land, 0.57 km^{2} (0.22 mi^{2}) or 4.6% is settled (buildings or roads), 0.02 km^{2} (4.9 acres) or 0.2% is either rivers or lakes.

Of the built up area, housing and buildings made up 2.8% and transportation infrastructure made up 1.7%. Out of the forested land, 18.2% of the total land area is heavily forested and 2.6% is covered with orchards or small clusters of trees. Of the agricultural land, 21.2% is used for growing crops and 50.5% is pastures, while 2.3% is used for orchards or vine crops. All the water in the municipality is flowing water.

The municipality is located in the hilly, rural land between the Schwarzwasser and Scherlibach streams. It consists of the village of Oberbalm, scattered hamlets and individual farm houses.

On 31 December 2009 Amtsbezirk Bern, the municipality's former district, was dissolved. On the following day, 1 January 2010, it joined the newly created Verwaltungskreis Bern-Mittelland.

== Coat of arms ==
The blazon of the municipal coat of arms is Per fess vert and Argent a Holly branch counterchanged.

== Demographics ==
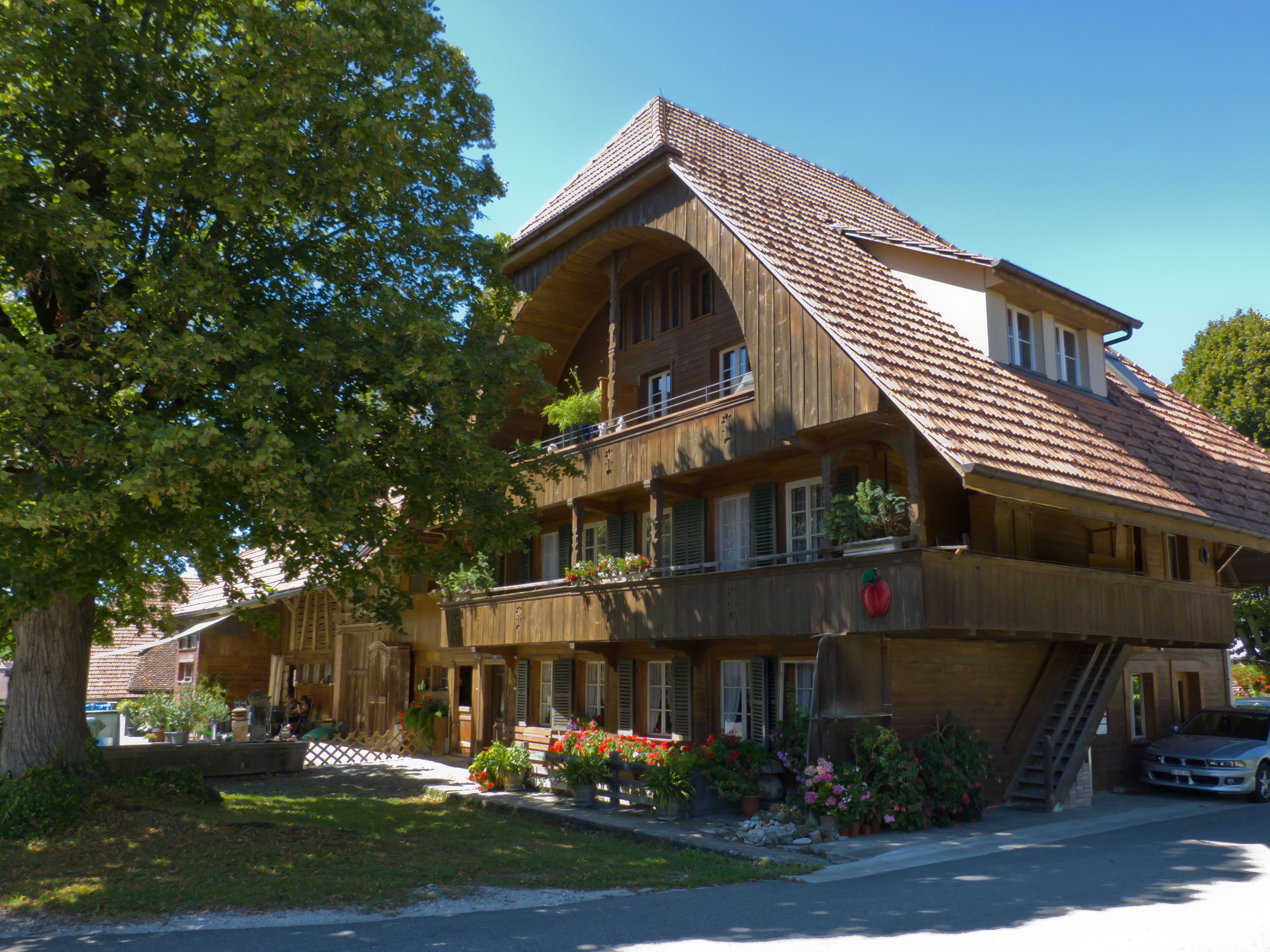
Farm house at Oberbalmstrasse 211

Oberbalm has a population (as of December 2020) of 866. As of 2010, 4.3% of the population are resident foreign nationals. Over the last 10 years (2000-2010) the population has changed at a rate of 2.2%. Migration accounted for -0.2%, while births and deaths accounted for 2.9%.

Most of the population (as of 2000) speaks German (826 or 98.9%) as their first language. French, English and Italian all have one native speaker.

As of 2008, the population was 50.1% male and 49.9% female. The population was made up of 415 Swiss men (48.0% of the population) and 18 (2.1%) non-Swiss men. There were 413 Swiss women (47.7%) and 19 (2.2%) non-Swiss women. Of the population in the municipality, 390 or about 46.7% were born in Oberbalm and lived there in 2000. There were 332 or 39.8% who were born in the same canton, while 59 or 7.1% were born somewhere else in Switzerland, and 21 or 2.5% were born outside of Switzerland.

As of 2010, children and teenagers (0–19 years old) make up 20.6% of the population, while adults (20–64 years old) make up 62.5% and seniors (over 64 years old) make up 16.9%.

As of 2000, there were 374 people who were single and never married in the municipality. There were 390 married individuals, 53 widows or widowers and 18 individuals who are divorced.

As of 2000, there were 102 households that consist of only one person and 40 households with five or more people. In 2000, a total of 319 apartments (84.2% of the total) were permanently occupied, while 43 apartments (11.3%) were seasonally occupied and 17 apartments (4.5%) were empty. As of 2010, the construction rate of new housing units was 1.2 new units per 1000 residents.

The historical population is given in the following chart:

== Heritage sites of national significance ==
The farm house at Stöckli 203 and the granaries at Horbermatt 114 and Oberbalmstrasse 209 A are listed as Swiss heritage site of national significance.

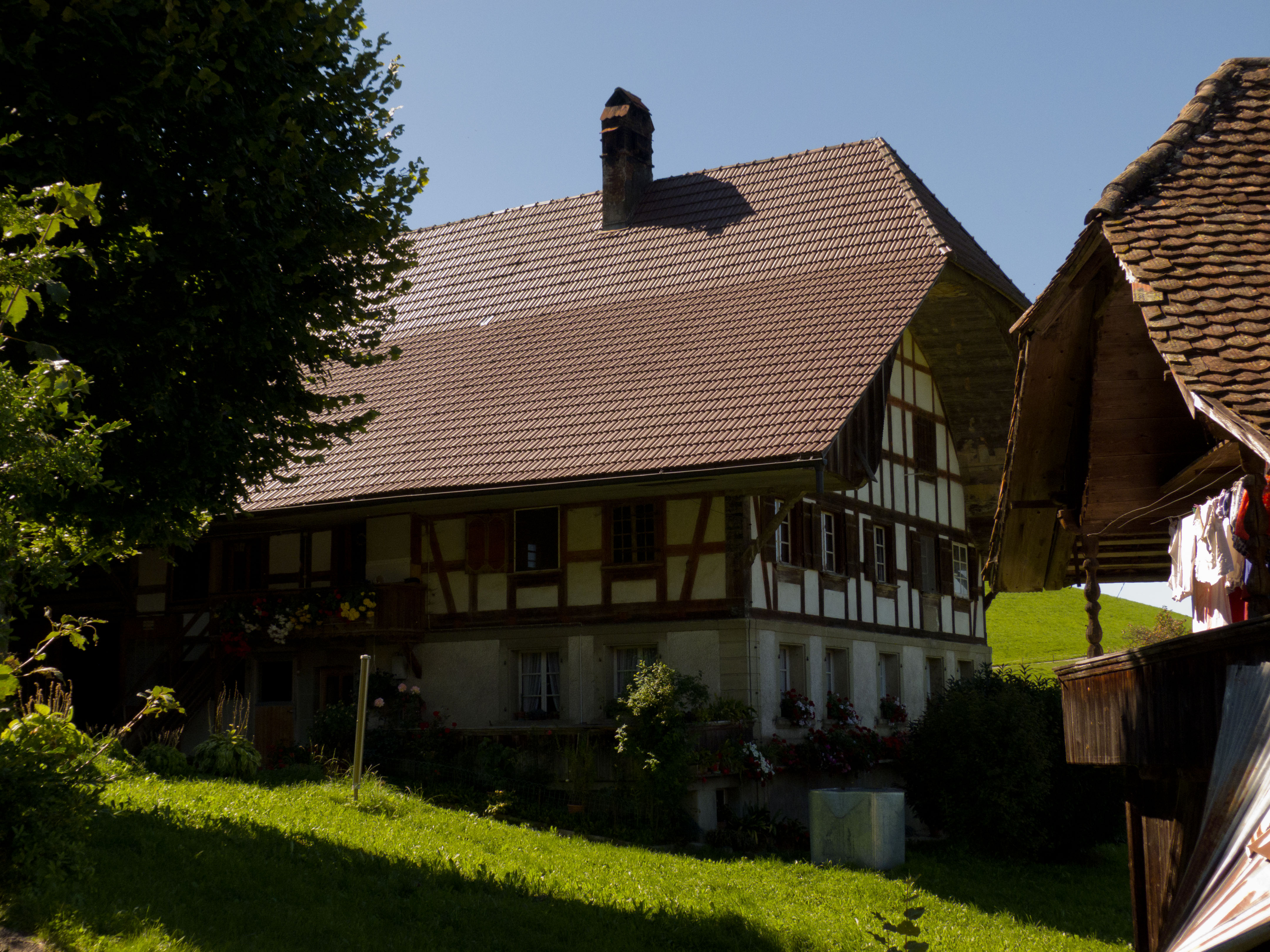
Farm House at Stöckli 203

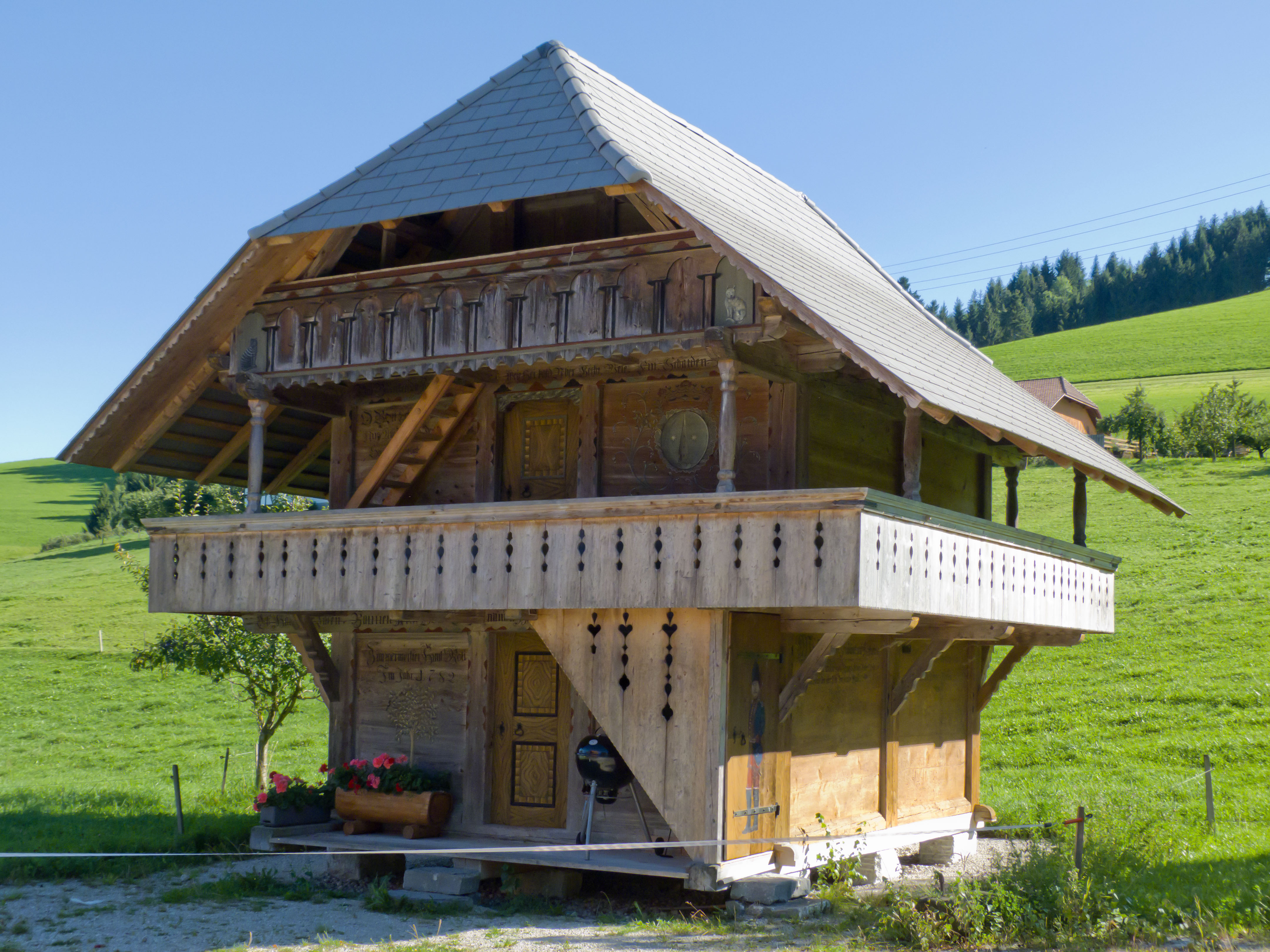
Granary at Horbermatt 114

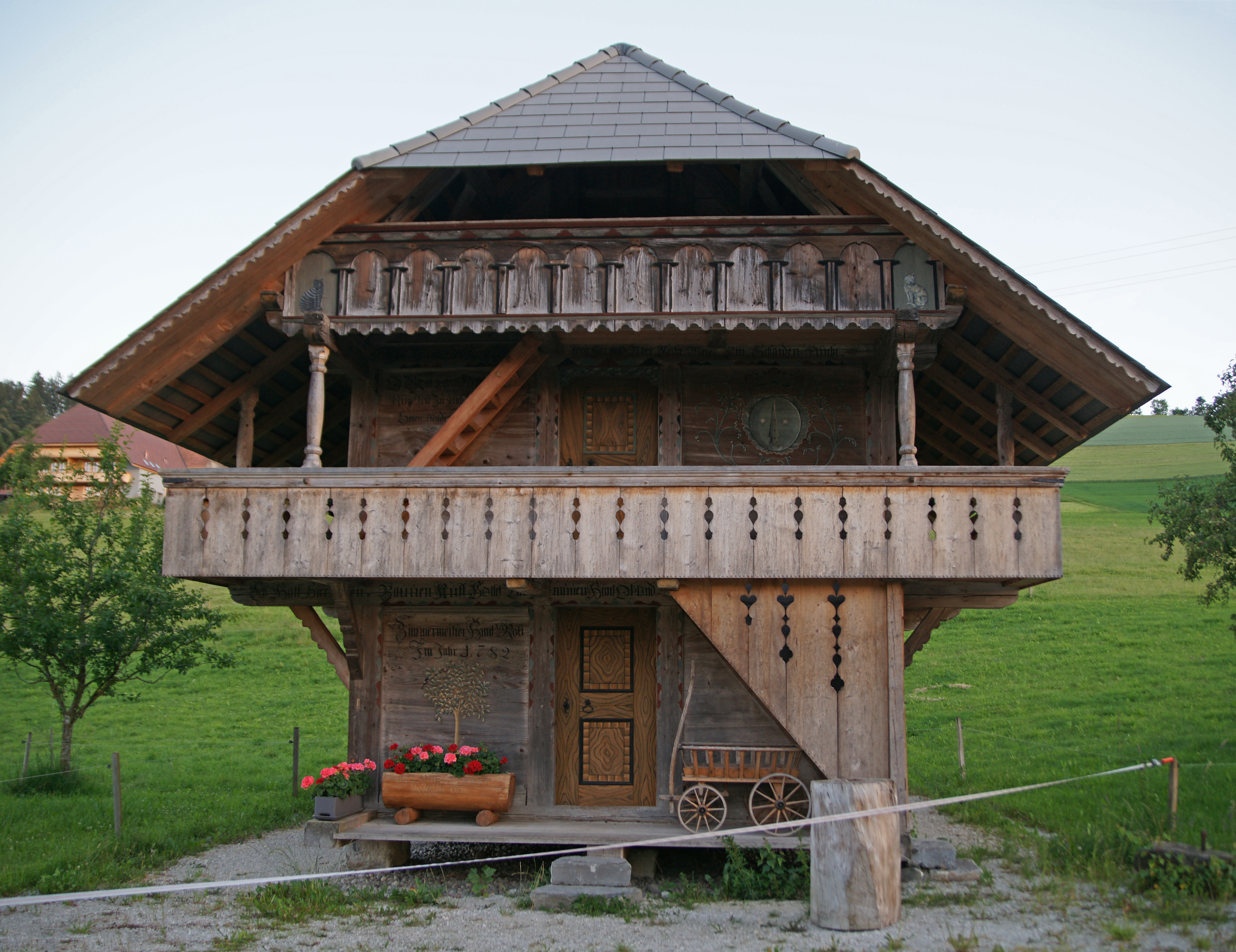
Granary at Oberbalmstrasse 209 A

=== Sights ===
The village of Oberbalm is famous for its church, the St. Sulpitius Church which contains frescoes from 1470. Oberbalm is a place of pilgrimage.

Each summer an open-air Rock Festival (Outdoor Elch) is held on top of Balmberg Hill.

== Politics ==
In the 2011 federal election the most popular party was the SVP which received 50.6% of the vote. The next two most popular parties were the BDP Party (14%), and the SPS (10.4%). In the federal election, a total of 389 votes were cast, and the voter turnout was 56.0%.

== Economy ==
As of 2011, Oberbalm had an unemployment rate of 1.09%. As of 2008, there were a total of 278 people employed in the municipality. Of these, there were 186 people employed in the primary economic sector and about 69 businesses involved in this sector. 53 people were employed in the secondary sector and there were 10 businesses in this sector. 39 people were employed in the tertiary sector, with 12 businesses in this sector.

In 2008 there were a total of 185 full-time equivalent jobs. The number of jobs in the primary sector was 112, all of which were in agriculture. The number of jobs in the secondary sector was 48 of which 6 or (12.5%) were in manufacturing and 42 (87.5%) were in construction. The number of jobs in the tertiary sector was 25. In the tertiary sector; 8 or 32.0% were in wholesale or retail sales or the repair of motor vehicles, 6 or 24.0% were in a hotel or restaurant, 1 was the insurance or financial industry, 2 or 8.0% were technical professionals or scientists, 4 or 16.0% were in education.

In 2000, there were 27 workers who commuted into the municipality and 298 workers who commuted away. The municipality is a net exporter of workers, with about 11.0 workers leaving the municipality for every one entering. Of the working population, 17.9% used public transportation to get to work, and 43.5% used a private car.

== Religion ==
From the 2000 census, 36 or 4.3% were Roman Catholic, while 692 or 82.9% belonged to the Swiss Reformed Church. Of the rest of the population, there was 1 member of an Orthodox church, there was 1 individual who belongs to the Christian Catholic Church, and there were 84 individuals (or about 10.06% of the population) who belonged to another Christian church. There were 5 (or about 0.60% of the population) who were Islamic. 37 (or about 4.43% of the population) belonged to no church, are agnostic or atheist, and 21 individuals (or about 2.51% of the population) did not answer the question.

== Education ==
In Oberbalm about 314 or (37.6%) of the population have completed non-mandatory upper secondary education, and 86 or (10.3%) have completed additional higher education (either university or a Fachhochschule). Of the 86 who completed tertiary schooling, 66.3% were Swiss men, 29.1% were Swiss women.

The Canton of Bern school system provides one year of non-obligatory Kindergarten, followed by six years of Primary school. This is followed by three years of obligatory lower Secondary school where the students are separated according to ability and aptitude. Following the lower Secondary students may attend additional schooling or they may enter an apprenticeship.

During the 2009–10 school year, there were a total of 75 students attending classes in Oberbalm. There was one kindergarten class with a total of 14 students in the municipality. Of the kindergarten students, 7.1% were permanent or temporary residents of Switzerland (not citizens) and 7.1% have a different mother language than the classroom language. The municipality had 3 primary classes and 61 students. Of the primary students, 1.6% were permanent or temporary residents of Switzerland (not citizens) and 1.6% have a different mother language than the classroom language.

As of 2000, there was one student in Oberbalm who came from another municipality, while 37 residents attended schools outside the municipality.
