= Wahlern =

- Former municipality
- Flag Coat of arms
- Location of Wahlern
- Location within Switzerland Location within Canton of Bern
- Coordinates: 46°49′N 7°21′E
- Country: Switzerland
- Canton: Bern
- District: Bern-Mittelland

Government
  - Mayor: Rudolf Krebs

Area
  - Total: 40.6 km^{2} (15.7 sq mi)
- Elevation: 792 m (2,598 ft)

Population (31 December 2010)
  - Total: 6,197
  - Density: 153/km^{2} (395/sq mi)
- Time zone: UTC+01:00 (CET)
  - Summer (DST): UTC+02:00 (CEST)
- Postal codes: 3150 Schwarzenburg; 3148 Lanzenhäusern
- SFOS number: 854
- ISO 3166 code: CH-BE
- Localities: Schwarzenburg, Lanzenhäusern, Steinenbrünnen
- Surrounded by: Köniz, Oberbalm, Rüeggisberg, Rüschegg, Guggisberg, Alterswil, St. Antoni, Heitenried, Albligen and Ueberstorf
- Website: www.wahlern.ch

Wahlern is a former municipality of the canton of Bern in Switzerland and seat of the Bern-Mittelland administrative district. On 1 January 2011, the former municipalities of Wahlern and Albligen merged in the new municipality of Schwarzenburg.

== Geography ==
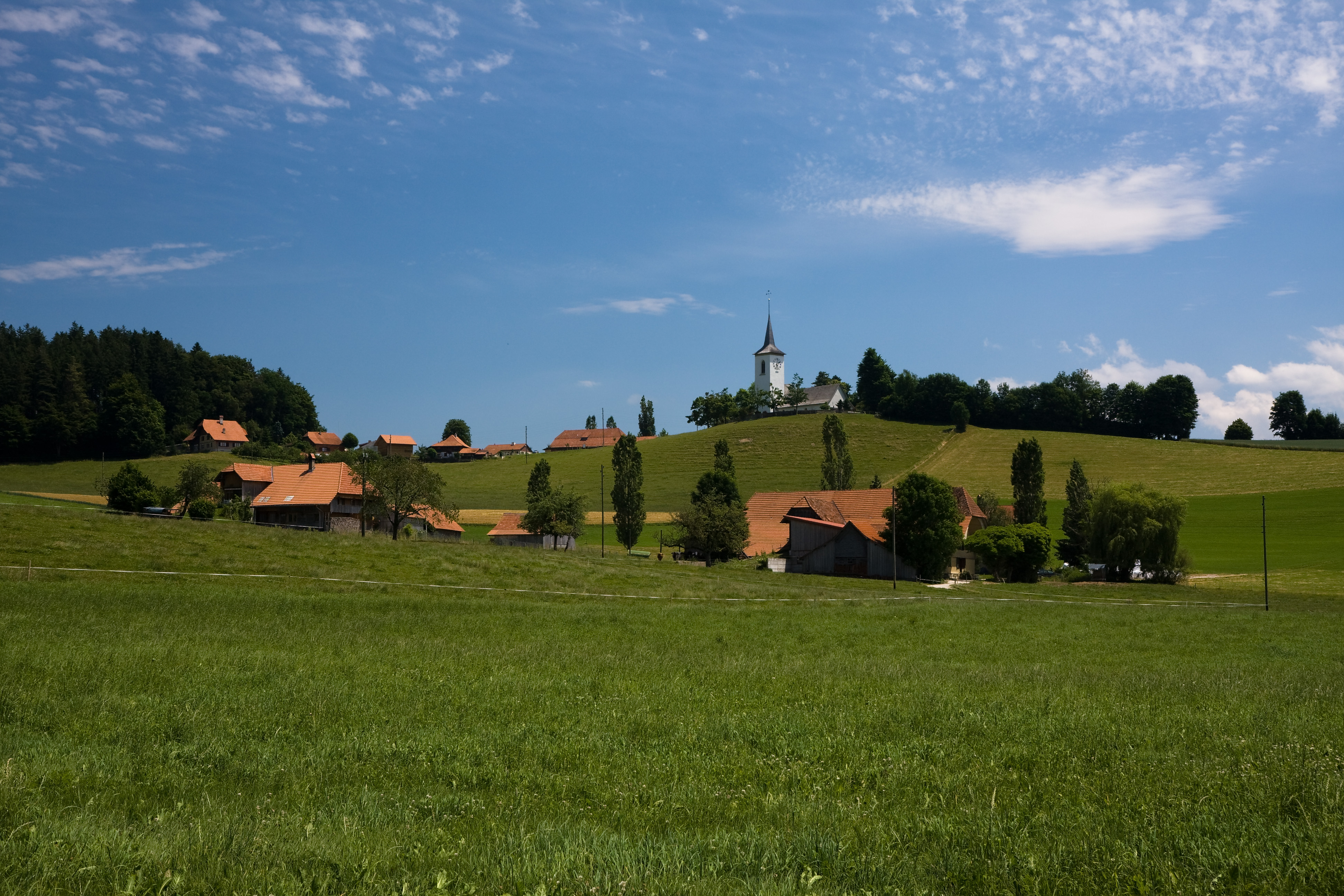
Wahlern hamlet

The municipality is called Wahlern, although the chief settlement shares the name of the administrative district, Schwarzenburg. It is known as one of the transmitters of the shortwave radio station Schweizer Radio International. Other settlements in the municipality include Lanzenhäusern and Steinenbrünnen.

Wahlern lies in the Swiss Plateau Alpenvorland south of the Sense River.

Wahlern has an area of 40.5 km^{2} (15.6 sq mi). Of this area, 63.5% is used for agricultural purposes, while 27.3% is forested. Of the rest of the land, 7.3% is settled (buildings or roads) and the remainder (1.9%) is non-productive (rivers, glaciers or mountains).

The neighboring municipalities are: Köniz, Oberbalm, Rüeggisberg, Rüschegg, Guggisberg, Alterswil, St. Antoni, Heitenried, Albligen and Ueberstorf.

== Demographics ==
Wahlern has a population (as of 31 December 2010) of 6197. As of 2007, 4.0% of the population was made up of foreign nationals. Over the last 10 years the population has grown at a rate of 2.5%. Most of the population (as of 2000) speaks German (95.9%), with French being second most common ( 0.7%) and Albanian being third ( 0.7%).

In the 2007 election the most popular party was the SVP which received 44.6% of the vote. The next three most popular parties were the SPS (19%), the FDP (10.5%) and the Green Party (10.1%).

The age distribution of the population (as of 2000) is children and teenagers (0–19 years old) make up 26.1% of the population, while adults (20–64 years old) make up 59.3% and seniors (over 64 years old) make up 14.6%. The entire Swiss population is generally well educated. In Wahlern about 74.1% of the population (between age 25-64) have completed either non-mandatory upper secondary education or additional higher education (either University or a Fachhochschule).

Wahlern has an unemployment rate of 1.18%. As of 2005, there were 606 people employed in the primary economic sector and about 206 businesses involved in this sector. 1076 people are employed in the secondary sector and there are 73 businesses in this sector. 1189 people are employed in the tertiary sector, with 176 businesses in this sector.

== Transportation ==
Schwarzenburg is the terminal station of the Bern-Schwarzenburg-Bahn, which opened in 1907 and today forms part of the BLS AG. Lanzenhäusern also has a station.

There is no postal code for Wahlern; mail is instead shipped to 3150 Schwarzenburg or 3148 Lanzenhäusern.

== Heritage sites of national significance ==
The farm house Aeckenmatt at Aeckenmatt 6, the ruins of Grasburg Castle, the Frühmesskapelle at Käppeligässli 5, the Rossgrabenbrücke (bridge, shared with Rüeggisberg), Schwarzenburg Castle and the granary at Henzischwand 298 A are all listed as Swiss heritage sites of national significance. The entire village of Schwarzenburg and the hamlets of Äckenmatt and Elisried are designated as part of the Inventory of Swiss Heritage Sites.

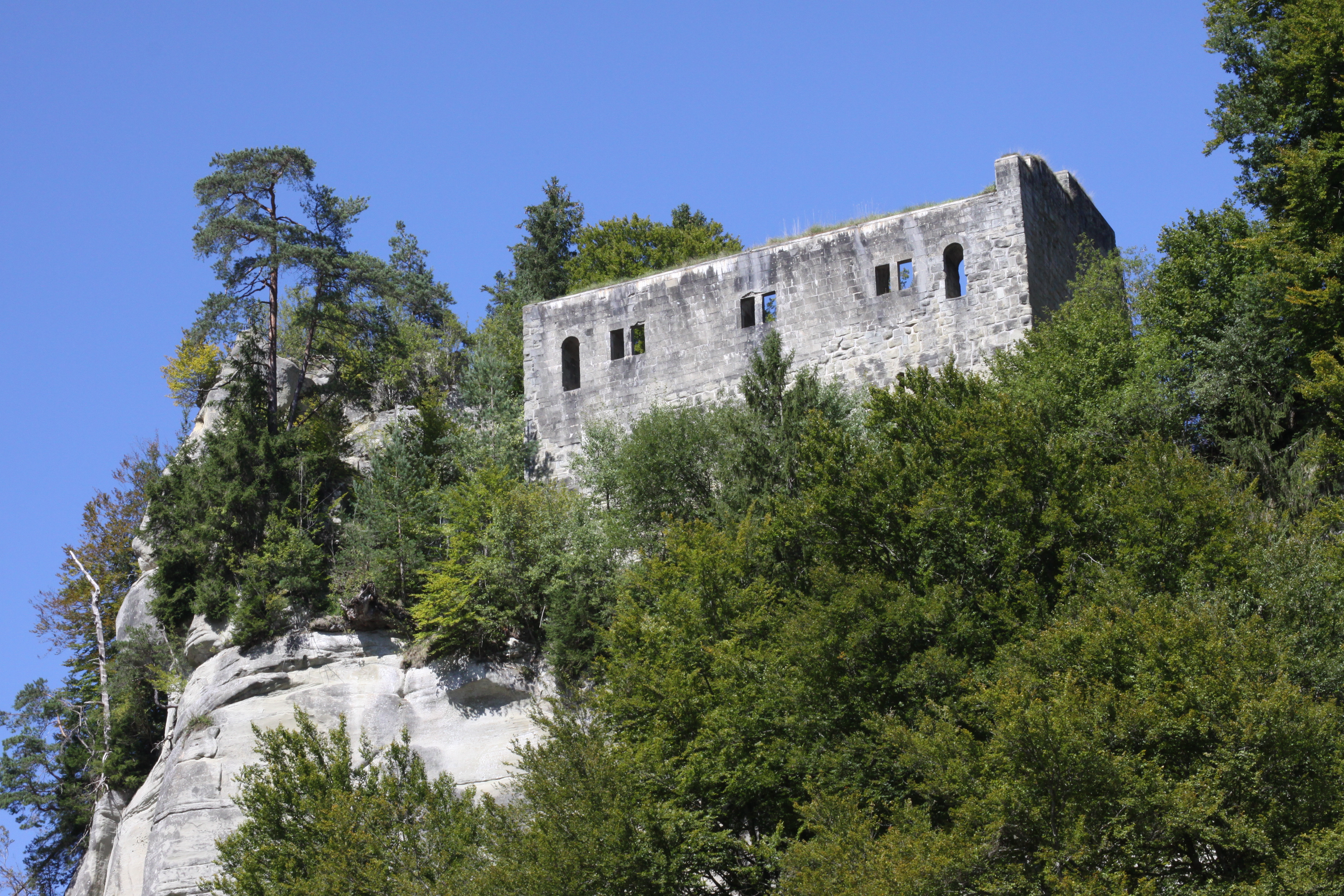
Ruins of Grasburg Castle

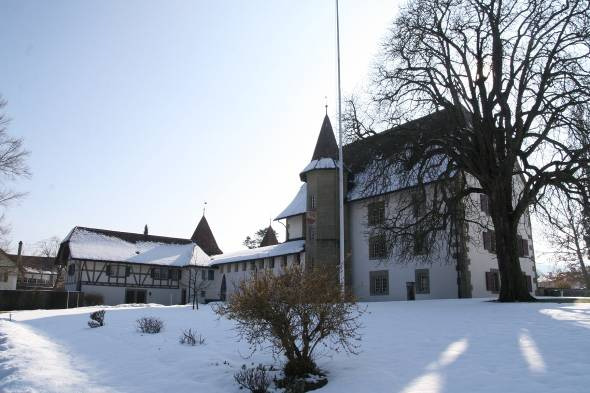
Castle Schwarzenburg

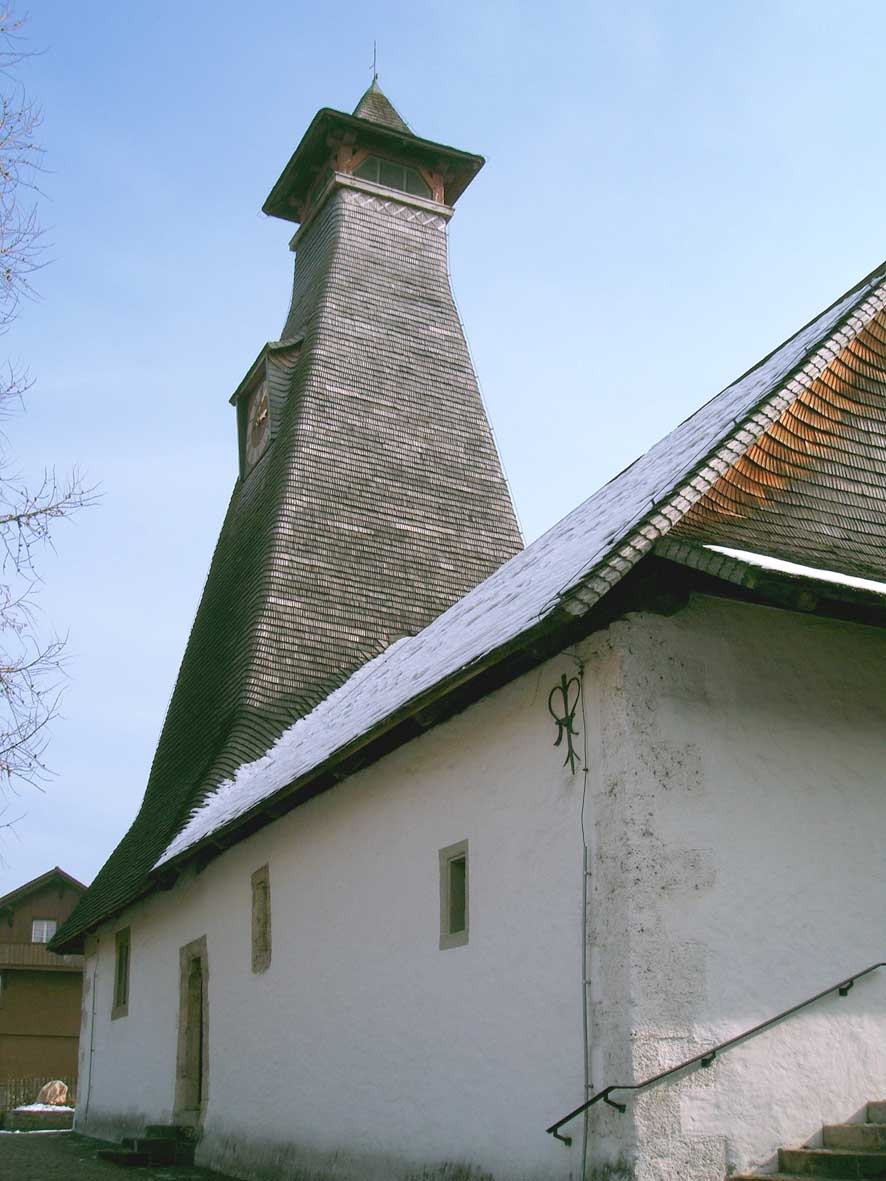
Frühmesskapelle
