= Schmitten, Fribourg =

Schmitten
- Municipality
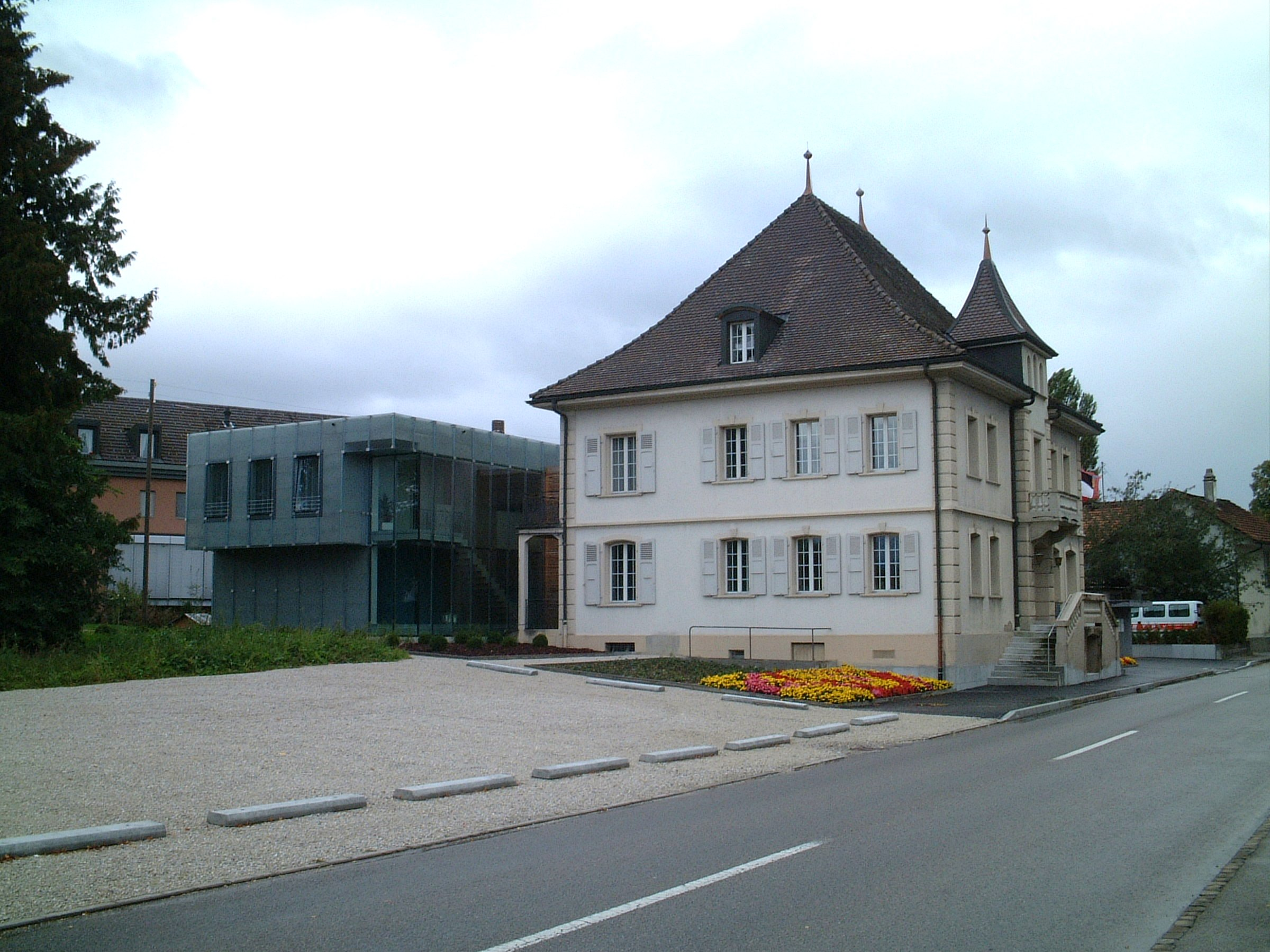
- Schmitten town hall

- Flag Coat of arms
- Location of Schmitten
- Location within Switzerland Location within Canton of Fribourg
- Coordinates: 46°51′N 7°15′E
- Country: Switzerland
- Canton: Fribourg
- District: Sense

Government
  - Mayor: Gemeindeammann; Urs Stampfli CSP (as of May 2008)

Area
  - Total: 13.55 km^{2} (5.23 sq mi)
- Elevation: 647 m (2,123 ft)

Population (December 2020)
  - Total: 4,166
  - Density: 307.5/km^{2} (796.3/sq mi)
- Time zone: UTC+01:00 (CET)
  - Summer (DST): UTC+02:00 (CEST)
- Postal code: 3185
- SFOS number: 2305
- ISO 3166 code: CH-FR
- Surrounded by: Bösingen, Düdingen, Sankt Antoni, Tafers, Wünnewil-Flamatt
- Twin towns: Dąbrowica (Poland)
- Website: www.schmitten.ch

Schmitten is a municipality in the district of Sense in the canton of Fribourg in Switzerland. It is one of the municipalities with a large majority of German speakers in the mostly French speaking Canton of Fribourg.

== History ==
Schmitten is first mentioned in 1242 as Schmitton. In the 14th century, the name Der Schmitten was common. Because the chapel of Schmitten was consecrated to Saint Otmar, for a period the town was also called Othmarswil, first mentioned in 1379.

The Earl of Thierstein ruled Schmitten in medieval times. In the 15th century, Schmitten came under the authority of Fribourg, where it was subordinated under the "Old Landscape" (Aupanner). After the breakdown of the Ancien Régime (1798), Schmitten belonged to the District of Fribourg and after 1831 to the Germanspeaking District Freiburg, bevor it was integrated into the District of Singine (Sensebezirk) with the new constitution of the canton.

With regard to the church as well as political aspects, Schmitten always belonged to the neighbouring community of Düdingen. In the church community of Düdingen, Schmitten formed two parishes, called the "Wilerschrot" and "Lantenschrot". The liberal constitution of the canton Fribourg of 1831 resulted in forming the four boroughs of the church community of Düdingen into independent communities, but this development was reverted already in 1832. The parishes "Wilerschrot" and "Lantenschrot" were unified into the new "Schmittenschrot", which aimed at independency in both the church and political aspects. Due to differences with the church community of Düdingen, Schmitten became an own parish in 1885.

The fact that Schmitten now was an own parish, and also the circumstance that Schmitten had their own train station that became a regional center, lead to an effort becoming an independent political community as well. The inhabitants of Schmitten were asked about their opinion in a consultational vote, resulting in a share of 95% of voters in favour of an independent political community.

Against the opinion of the municipal council of Düdingen, the council of Fribourg decided on 21 November 1922 to declare for Schmitten the status of an independent political community. A further enlargement of Schmitten took place in 1976 when the neighbouring community of Wünnewil-Flamatt gave a residential area of 29 hectares north of the train station to Schmitten.

== Geography ==
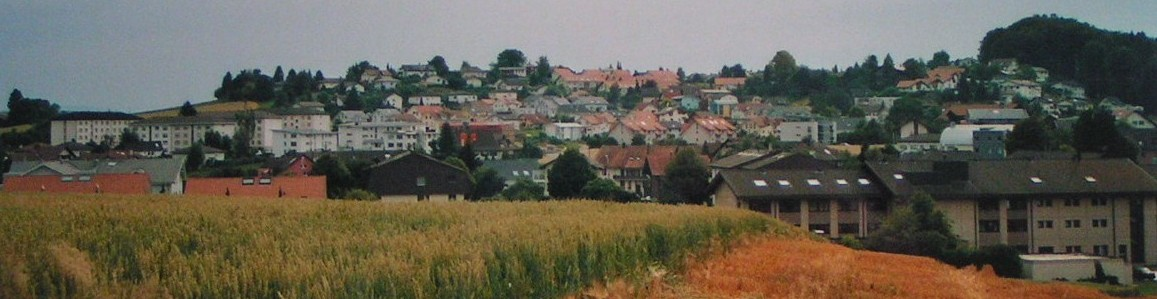
Upper village section of Schmitten

Schmitten is located at an elevation of 647 m (2,123 ft) above sea level. The aerial distance to the canton's capital Fribourg is 9 km (5.6 mi). The town stands on a plateau east of the Dälihubel which is standing slightly towards the north. The area belongs to the Fribourg middle lands and has plenty of hills.

The highest elevation of Schmitten is the Wilerholz (767 m [2,516 ft] above sea level).

Schmitten has an area of 13.5 km^{2} (5.21 sq mi). Of this area, 9.77 km^{2} (3.77 mi^{2}) or 72.4% is used for agricultural purposes, while 1.95 km^{2} (0.75 mi^{2}) or 14.4% is forested. Of the rest of the land, 1.78 km^{2} (0.69 mi^{2}) or 13.2% is settled (buildings or roads), 0.01 km^{2} (2.5 acres) or 0.1% is either rivers or lakes and 0.04 km^{2} (9.9 acres) or 0.3% is unproductive land.

Of the built up area, industrial buildings made up 1.3% of the total area while housing and buildings made up 6.7% and transportation infrastructure made up 4.5%. Out of the forested land, 13.0% of the total land area is heavily forested and 1.5% is covered with orchards or small clusters of trees. Of the agricultural land, 46.4% is used for growing crops and 24.6% is pastures, while 1.3% is used for orchards or vine crops. All the water in the municipality is flowing water.

The municipality is located in the Sense district, north-east of Fribourg. It consists of the village of Schmitten, the hamlets of Fillistorf, Lanthen, Ried, Tützenberg, Berg, Burg, Mühletal and Zirkels, along with the farmhouses of Bunziwil, Hohe Zelg, Wiler, Betlehem and Vetterwil.

== Coat of arms ==
The blazon of the municipal coat of arms is Gules a Snake Vert and Azure crowned Or between Tongs Azure and a Hammer of the same with a handle Or.

== Demographics ==
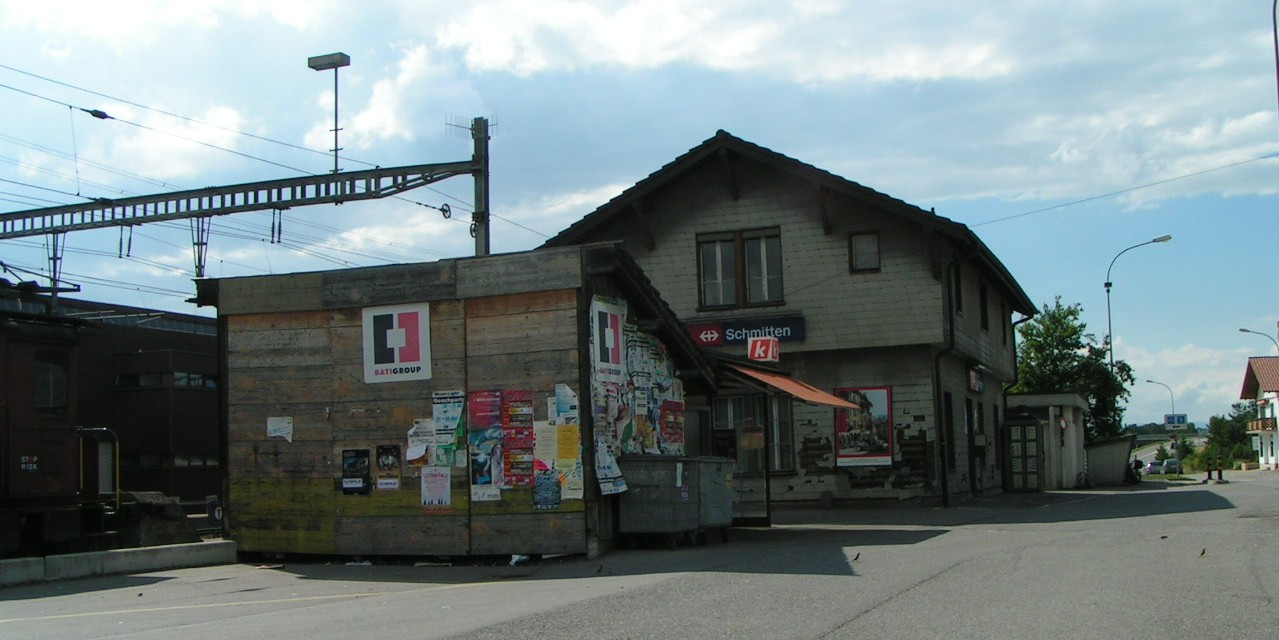
Schmitten train station

Schmitten has a population (as of December 2020) of 4,166. As of 2008, 9.4% of the population are resident foreign nationals. Over the last 10 years (2000–2010) the population has changed at a rate of 14.9%. Migration accounted for 11.3%, while births and deaths accounted for 4.1%.

Most of the population (as of 2000) speaks German (3,017 or 92.0%) as their first language, French is the second most common (71 or 2.2%) and Albanian is the third (53 or 1.6%). There are 26 people who speak Italian and 3 people who speak Romansh.

As of 2008, the population was 51.4% male and 48.6% female. The population was made up of 1,722 Swiss men (46.2% of the population) and 192 (5.2%) non-Swiss men. There were 1,646 Swiss women (44.2%) and 166 (4.5%) non-Swiss women. Of the population in the municipality, 1,214 or about 37.0% were born in Schmitten and lived there in 2000. There were 985 or 30.0% who were born in the same canton, while 633 or 19.3% were born somewhere else in Switzerland, and 288 or 8.8% were born outside of Switzerland.

As of 2000, children and teenagers (0–19 years old) make up 25.5% of the population, while adults (20–64 years old) make up 62.2% and seniors (over 64 years old) make up 12.3%.

As of 2000, there were 1,406 people who were single and never married in the municipality. There were 1,599 married individuals, 161 widows or widowers and 114 individuals who are divorced.

As of 2000, there were 1,197 private households in the municipality, and an average of 2.6 persons per household. There were 264 households that consist of only one person and 105 households with five or more people. In 2000, a total of 1,159 apartments (93.2% of the total) were permanently occupied, while 63 apartments (5.1%) were seasonally occupied and 21 apartments (1.7%) were empty. As of 2009, the construction rate of new housing units was 5.9 new units per 1000 residents. The vacancy rate for the municipality, in 2010, was 0.6%.

The historical population is given in the following chart:

== Heritage sites of national significance ==
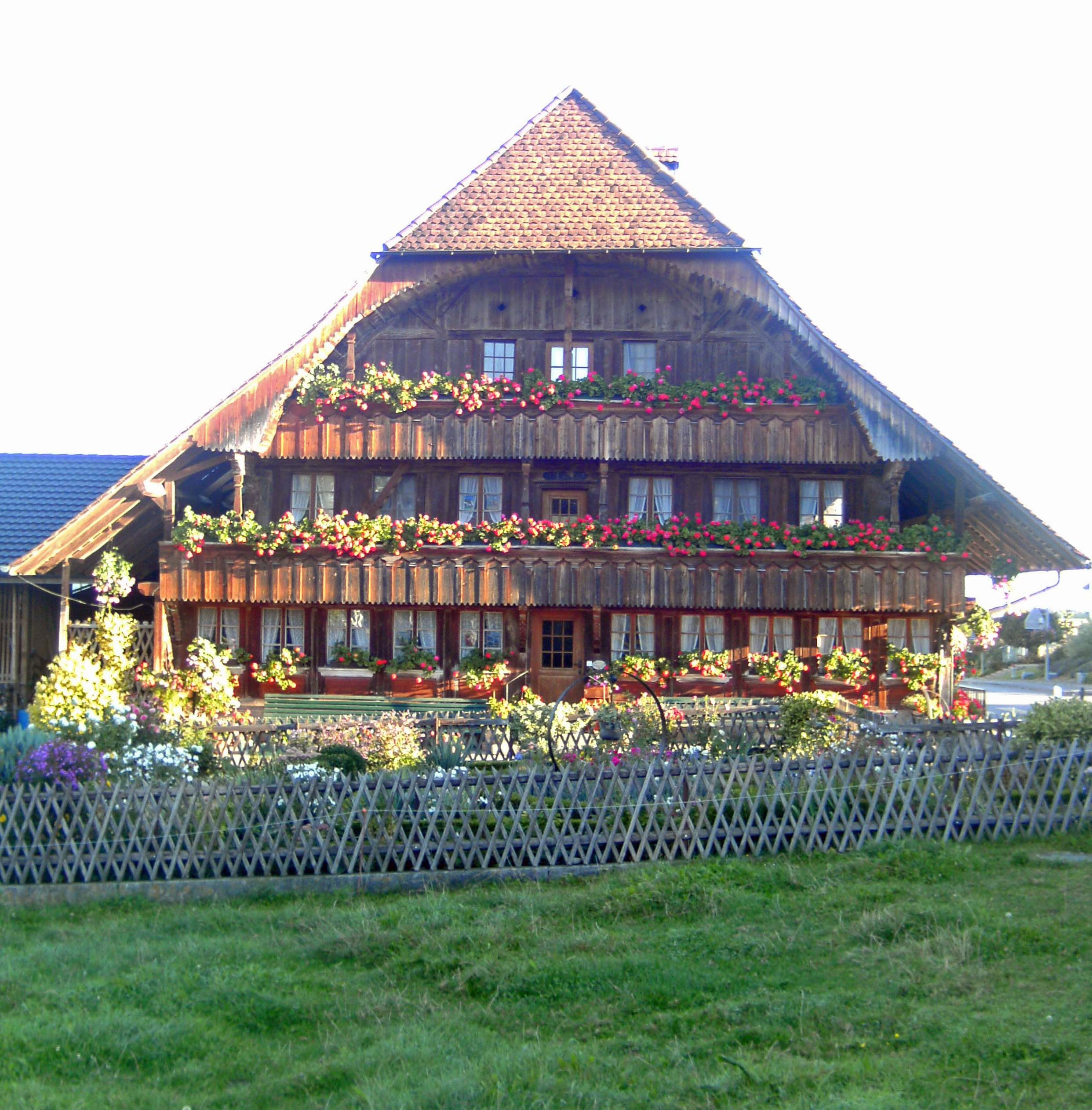
Wilhelm Vonlanthen Farm House

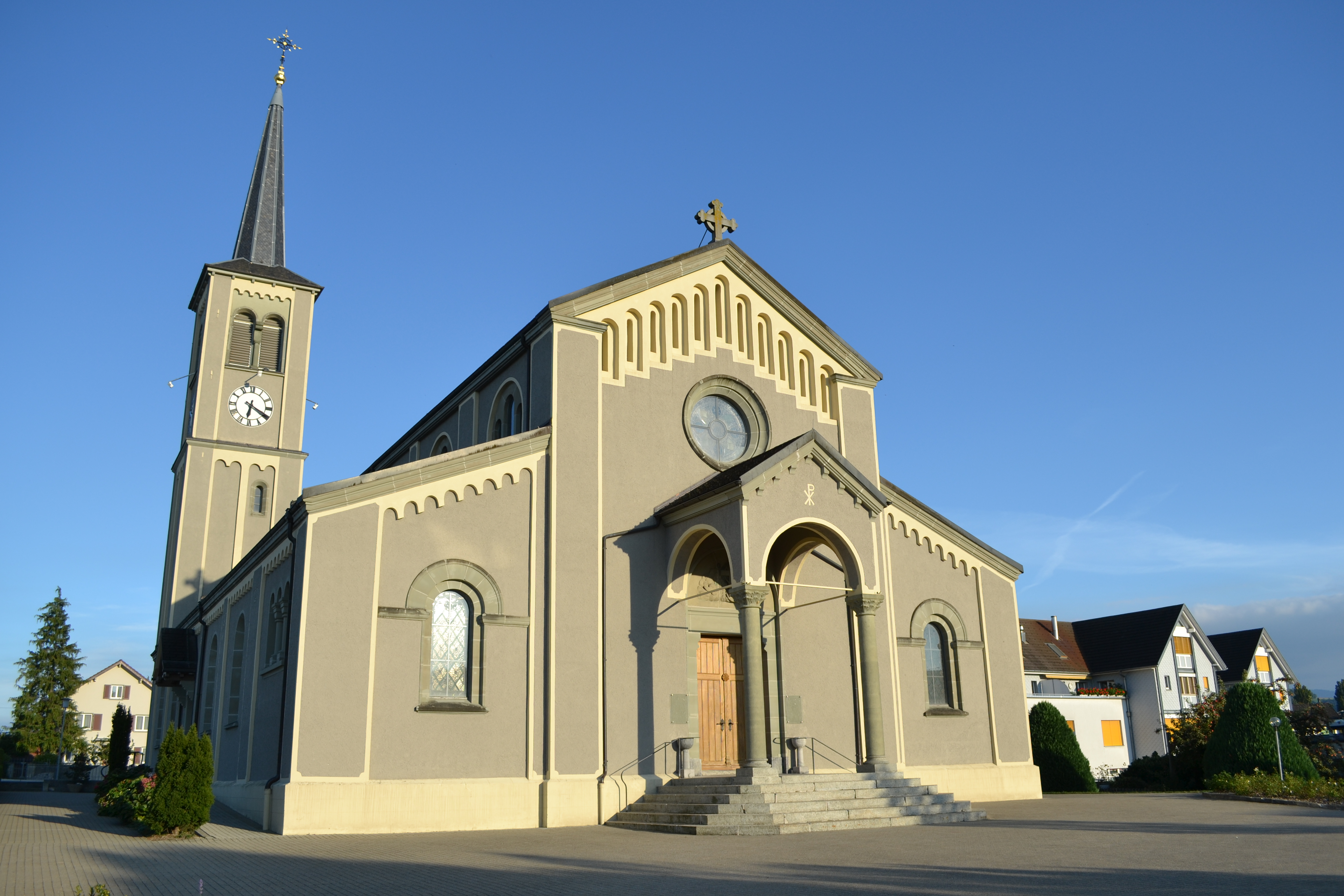
Parish church of Schmitten

The Wilhelm Vonlanthen Farm House and the Kreuzauffindung parish church are listed as Swiss heritage site of national significance.

== Politics ==
In the 2011 federal election the most popular party was the SPS which received 22.5% of the vote. The next three most popular parties were the CVP (19.6%), the SVP (19.3%) and the CSP (18.0%).

The SPS improved their position in Schmitten rising to first, from third in 2007 (with 18.5%) The CVP moved from first in 2007 (with 23.6%) to second in 2011, the SVP moved from fourth in 2007 (with 17.2%) to third and the CSP moved from second in 2007 (with 20.3%) to fourth. A total of 1,417 votes were cast in this election, of which 15 or 1.1% were invalid.

== Economy ==
Until the middle of the 20th century, Schmitten was mainly a farmers' town. Even today, agricultural products (crop, milk, meat and fruits) still take an important position.

The local small trade and service companies offer a sizable number of jobs as well. Right next to the train station, an important industrial area has developed due to the excellent traffic connections. Today, the following industries play an important role: Construction, transport, wood construction, metal construction, machines, furniture, a large bookbindery, printing, a large dispatching center of a leading national retailers chain, mechanical workplace, cheese dairy and a floor covering company.

In the last decades, Schmitten has also developed into an important residential area for commuters to Fribourg and Bern.

As of 2010, Schmitten had an unemployment rate of 1.9%. As of 2008, there were 118 people employed in the primary economic sector and about 45 businesses involved in this sector. 671 people were employed in the secondary sector and there were 36 businesses in this sector. 625 people were employed in the tertiary sector, with 93 businesses in this sector. There were 1,737 residents of the municipality who were employed in some capacity, of which females made up 40.5% of the workforce.

In 2008 the total number of full-time equivalent jobs was 1,184. The number of jobs in the primary sector was 82, all of which were in agriculture. The number of jobs in the secondary sector was 622 of which 495 or (79.6%) were in manufacturing, 1 was in mining and 126 (20.3%) were in construction. The number of jobs in the tertiary sector was 480. In the tertiary sector; 119 or 24.8% were in wholesale or retail sales or the repair of motor vehicles, 123 or 25.6% were in the movement and storage of goods, 14 or 2.9% were in a hotel or restaurant, 1 was in the information industry, 27 or 5.6% were the insurance or financial industry, 43 or 9.0% were technical professionals or scientists, 23 or 4.8% were in education and 92 or 19.2% were in health care.

In 2000, there were 901 workers who commuted into the municipality and 1,185 workers who commuted away. The municipality is a net exporter of workers, with about 1.3 workers leaving the municipality for every one entering. Of the working population, 18.4% used public transportation to get to work, and 59.7% used a private car.

== Religion ==
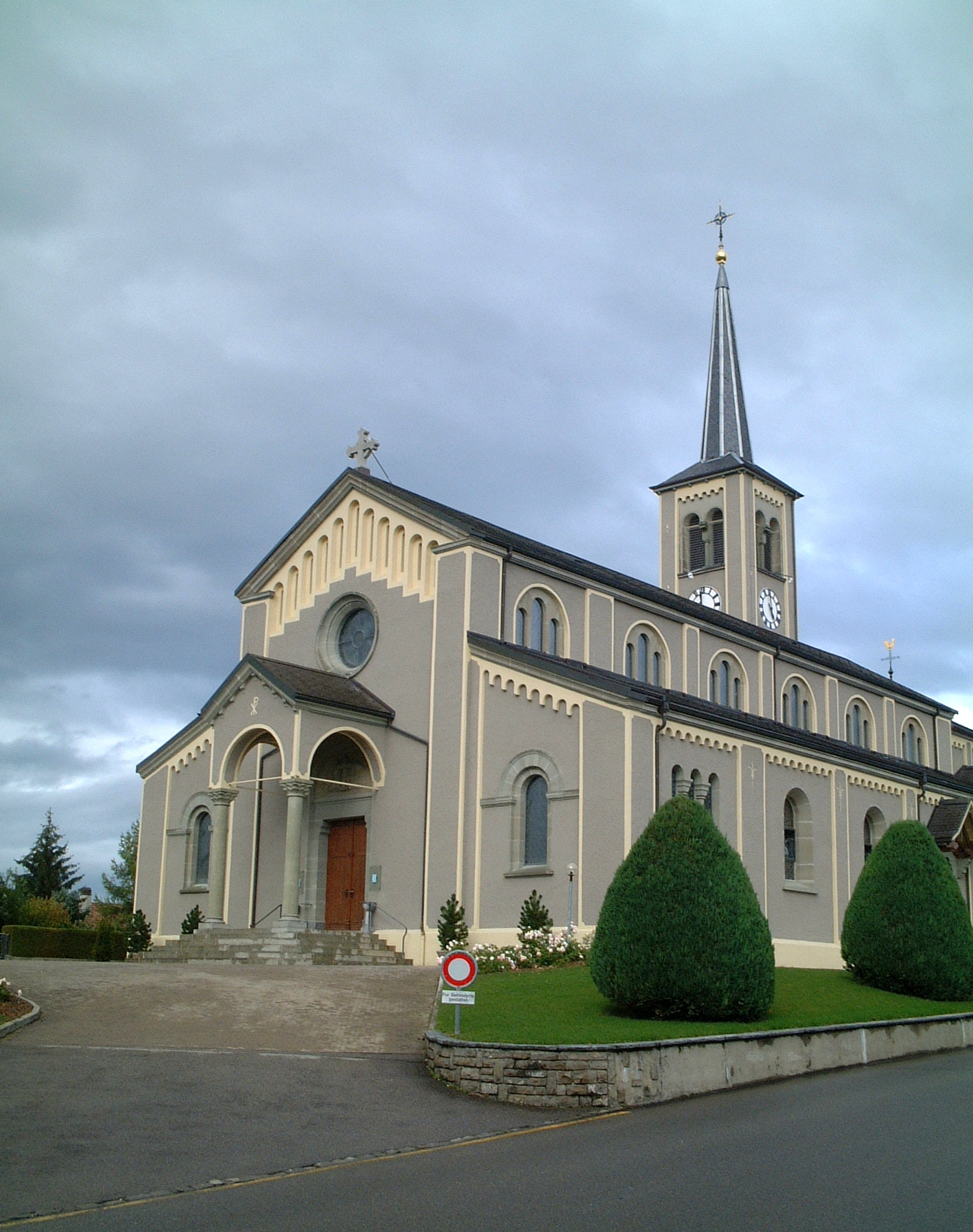
Parish church of Schmitten

From the 2000 census, 2,320 or 70.7% were Roman Catholic, while 533 or 16.3% belonged to the Swiss Reformed Church. Of the rest of the population, there were 57 members of an Orthodox church (or about 1.74% of the population), there were 2 individuals (or about 0.06% of the population) who belonged to the Christian Catholic Church, and there were 20 individuals (or about 0.61% of the population) who belonged to another Christian church. There were 113 (or about 3.45% of the population) who were Islamic. There were 10 individuals who were Buddhist and 8 individuals who belonged to another church. 109 (or about 3.32% of the population) belonged to no church, are agnostic or atheist, and 118 individuals (or about 3.60% of the population) did not answer the question.

== Transportation ==
The town has excellent traffic connections both by road and rail. Schmitten is very close to the old main road from Bern to Fribourg. In 1973, the new motorway A12 (Bern to Vevey) opened in a distance of 6 km to the town center. The closest entrances to the motorway are Düdingen and Flamatt. So, Schmitten can benefit from the motorway while still being far enough from it to not suffer from noise and passing traffic.

Already in the year 1860 (1860-07-02), the train connection from Bern to Düdingen (Balliswil) was opened with a train station in Schmitten and a stop in Fillistorf. There are further connections to the smaller places by bus.

== Education ==
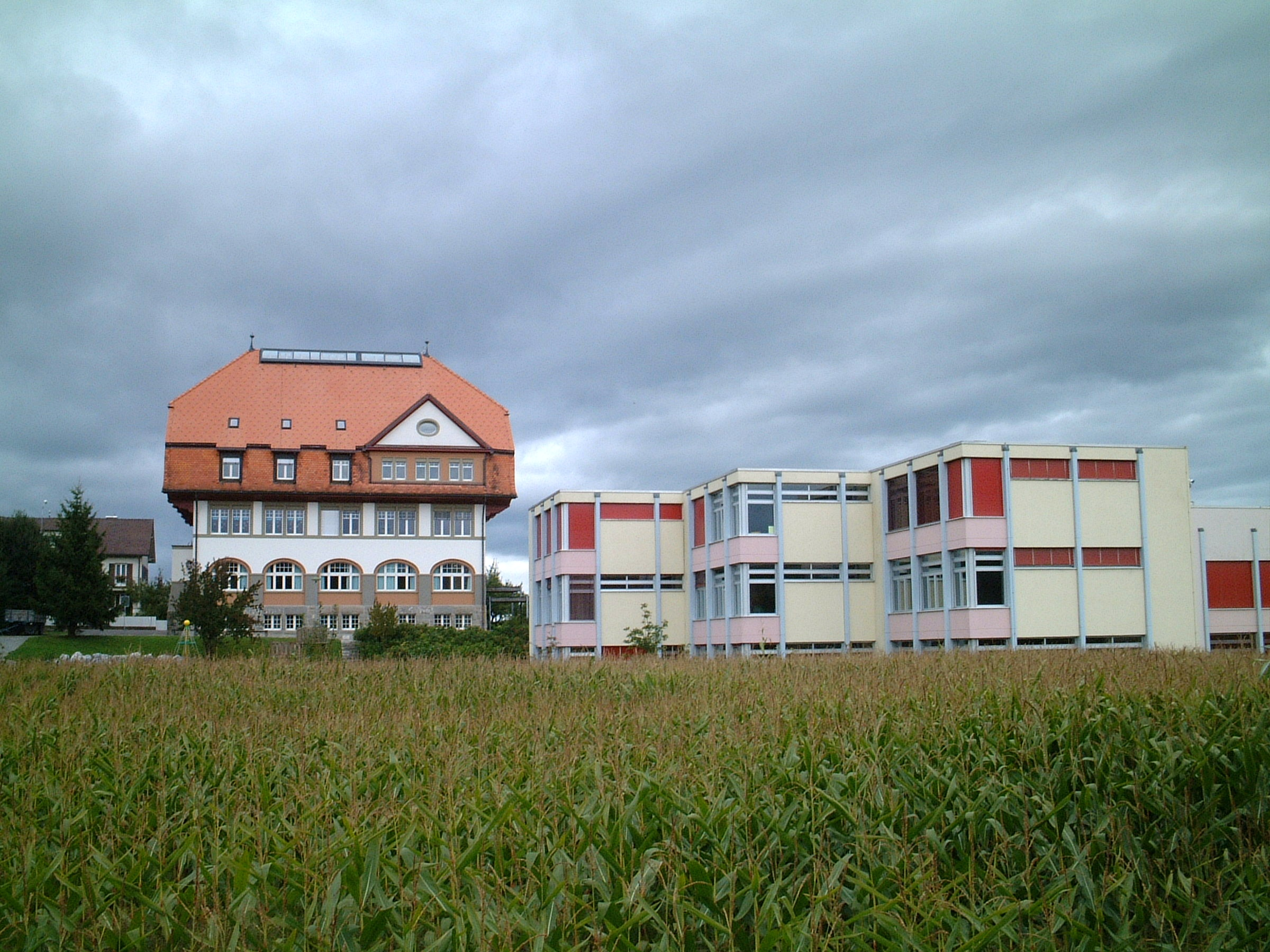
School buildings in Schmitten

In Schmitten about 1,152 or (35.1%) of the population have completed non-mandatory upper secondary education, and 404 or (12.3%) have completed additional higher education (either university or a Fachhochschule). Of the 404 who completed tertiary schooling, 71.5% were Swiss men, 22.3% were Swiss women, 3.5% were non-Swiss men and 2.7% were non-Swiss women.

The Canton of Fribourg school system provides one year of non-obligatory Kindergarten, followed by six years of Primary school. This is followed by three years of obligatory lower Secondary school where the students are separated according to ability and aptitude. Following the lower Secondary students may attend a three or four year optional upper Secondary school. The upper Secondary school is divided into gymnasium (university preparatory) and vocational programs. After they finish the upper Secondary program, students may choose to attend a Tertiary school or continue their apprenticeship.

During the 2010–11 school year, there were a total of 354 students attending 17 classes in Schmitten. A total of 647 students from the municipality attended any school, either in the municipality or outside of it. There were 5 kindergarten classes with a total of 101 students in the municipality. The municipality had 12 primary classes and 253 students. During the same year, there were no lower secondary classes in the municipality, but 155 students attended lower secondary school in a neighboring municipality. There were no upper Secondary classes or vocational classes, but there were 59 upper Secondary students and 69 upper Secondary vocational students who attended classes in another municipality. The municipality had no non-university Tertiary classes, but there were 2 specialized Tertiary students who attended classes in another municipality.

As of 2000, there were 8 students in Schmitten who came from another municipality, while 200 residents attended schools outside the municipality.
