= Heitenried =

- Municipality
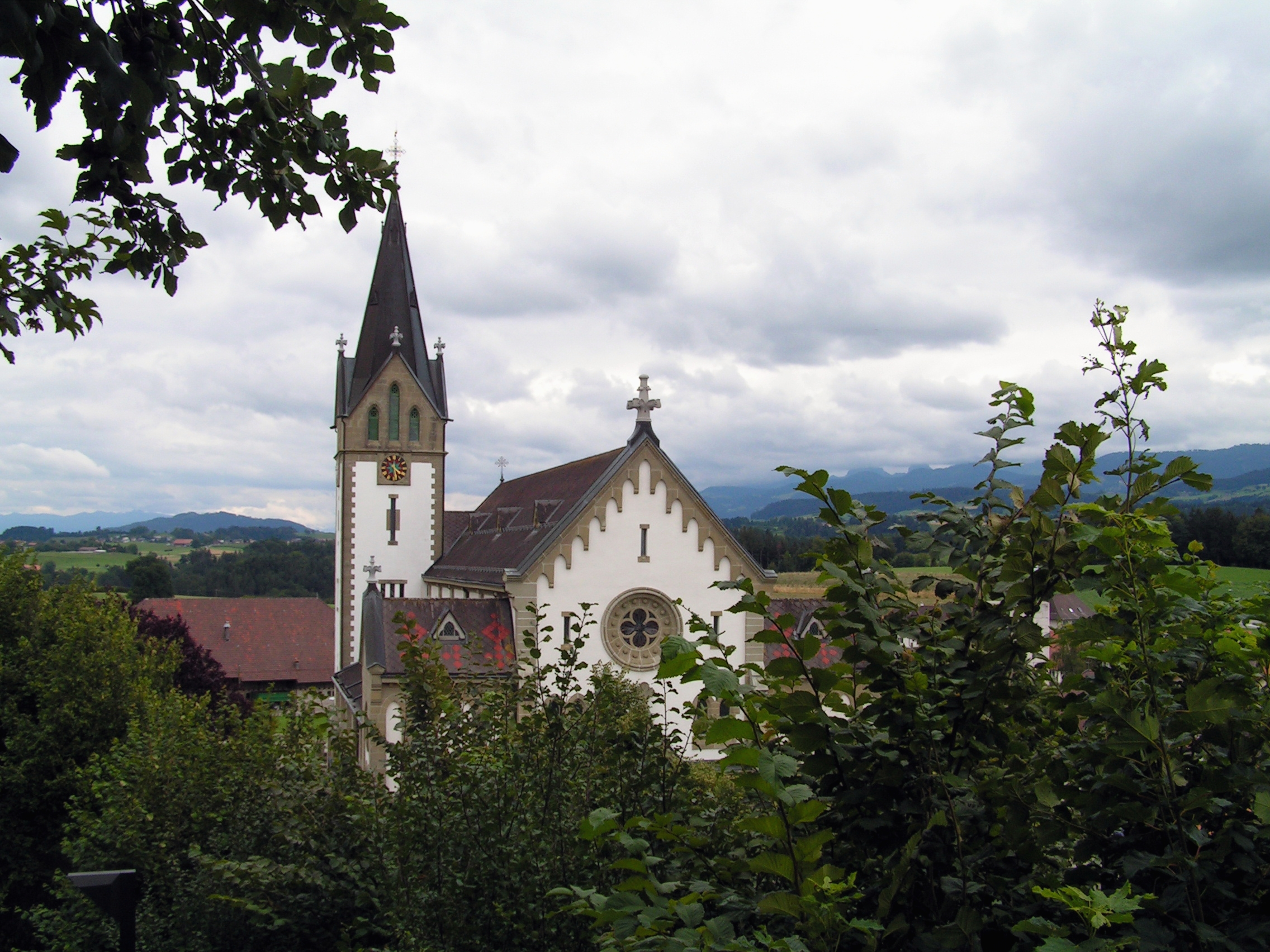
- Parish church of St. Michel in Heitenried village

- Flag Coat of arms
- Location of Heitenried
- Location within Switzerland Location within Canton of Fribourg
- Coordinates: 46°50′N 7°18′E
- Country: Switzerland
- Canton: Fribourg
- District: Sense

Government
  - Mayor: Gemeindeammann

Area
  - Total: 9.04 km^{2} (3.49 sq mi)
- Elevation: 762 m (2,500 ft)

Population (December 2020)
  - Total: 1,395
  - Density: 154/km^{2} (400/sq mi)
- Time zone: UTC+01:00 (CET)
  - Summer (DST): UTC+02:00 (CEST)
- Postal code: 1714
- SFOS number: 2296
- ISO 3166 code: CH-FR
- Surrounded by: Albligen (BE), Sankt Antoni, Ueberstorf, Wahlern (BE)
- Twin towns: Jaszago (Hungary)
- Website: www.heitenried.ch

Heitenried (formerly in French: Essert; Arpitan: Èssèrts [eˈʃɛ]) is a municipality in the district of Sense in the canton of Fribourg in Switzerland. It is one of the municipalities with a large majority of German speakers in the mostly French speaking Canton of Fribourg.

== History ==
Heitenried is first mentioned in French in 1228 as Essers. The German name was first mentioned in 1257 as Ried.

== Geography ==
Heitenried has an area of 9.13 km^{2} (3.53 sq mi). Of this area, 6.66 km^{2} (2.57 mi^{2}) or 73.0% is used for agricultural purposes, while 1.69 km^{2} (0.65 mi^{2}) or 18.5% is forested. Of the rest of the land, 0.61 km^{2} (0.24 mi^{2}) or 6.7% is settled (buildings or roads), 0.08 km^{2} (20 acres) or 0.9% is either rivers or lakes and 0.01 km^{2} (2.5 acres) or 0.1% is unproductive land.

Of the built up area, housing and buildings made up 3.6% and transportation infrastructure made up 2.3%. Out of the forested land, all of the forested land area is covered with heavy forests. Of the agricultural land, 42.8% is used for growing crops and 29.2% is pastures, while 1.1% is used for orchards or vine crops. All the water in the municipality is flowing water.

The municipality is located in the Sense district, 15 km (9.3 mi) east of Fribourg on the border with the Canton of Bern. It consists of the village of Heitenried and the hamlets of Scheuergraben, Schönfels, Selgiswil, Unterwinterlingen and Wiler vor Holz.

== Coat of arms ==
The blazon of the municipal coat of arms is Per fess Gules a Fleur de Lys issuant Argent and of the last.

== Demographics ==
Heitenried has a population (as of December 2020) of 1,395. As of 2008, 4.6% of the population are resident foreign nationals. Over the last 10 years (2000–2010) the population has changed at a rate of 11.2%. Migration accounted for 9%, while births and deaths accounted for 5.1%.

Most of the population (as of 2000) speaks German (1,070 or 97.2%) as their first language, French is the second most common (7 or 0.6%) and Portuguese is the third (7 or 0.6%). There is 1 person who speaks Italian.

As of 2008, the population was 50.8% male and 49.2% female. The population was made up of 618 Swiss men (48.9% of the population) and 24 (1.9%) non-Swiss men. There were 599 Swiss women (47.4%) and 22 (1.7%) non-Swiss women. Of the population in the municipality, 485 or about 44.1% were born in Heitenried and lived there in 2000. There were 305 or 27.7% who were born in the same canton, while 236 or 21.4% were born somewhere else in Switzerland, and 38 or 3.5% were born outside of Switzerland.

As of 2000, children and teenagers (0–19 years old) make up 27.3% of the population, while adults (20–64 years old) make up 61.7% and seniors (over 64 years old) make up 11%.

As of 2000, there were 492 people who were single and never married in the municipality. There were 555 married individuals, 35 widows or widowers and 19 individuals who are divorced.

As of 2000, there were 386 private households in the municipality, and an average of 2.8 persons per household. There were 79 households that consist of only one person and 53 households with five or more people. In 2000, a total of 376 apartments (92.6% of the total) were permanently occupied, while 14 apartments (3.4%) were seasonally occupied and 16 apartments (3.9%) were empty. As of 2009, the construction rate of new housing units was 15.8 new units per 1000 residents. The vacancy rate for the municipality, in 2010, was 0.63%.

The historical population is given in the following chart:

== Heritage sites of national significance ==
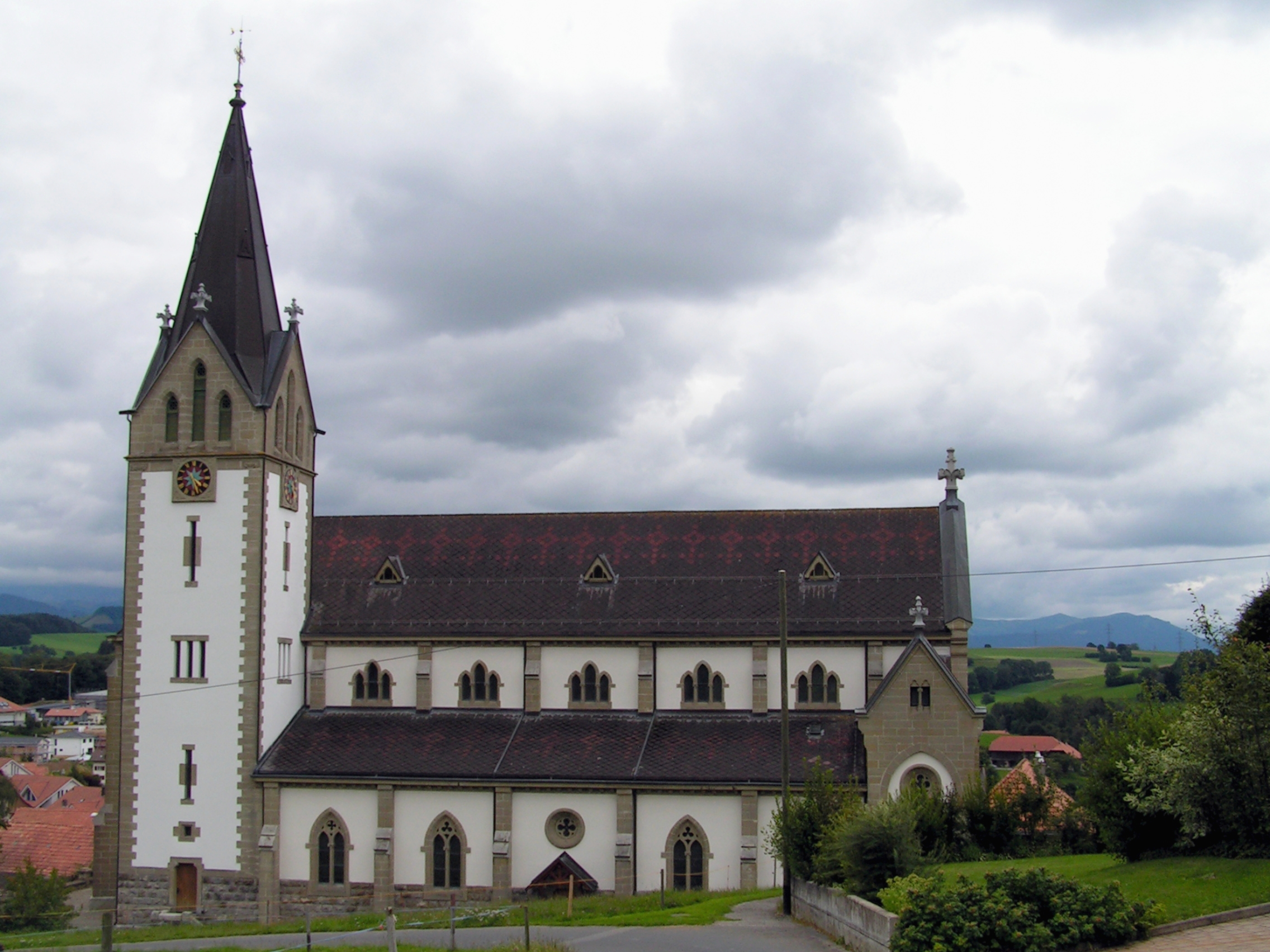
The parish church of St. Michael

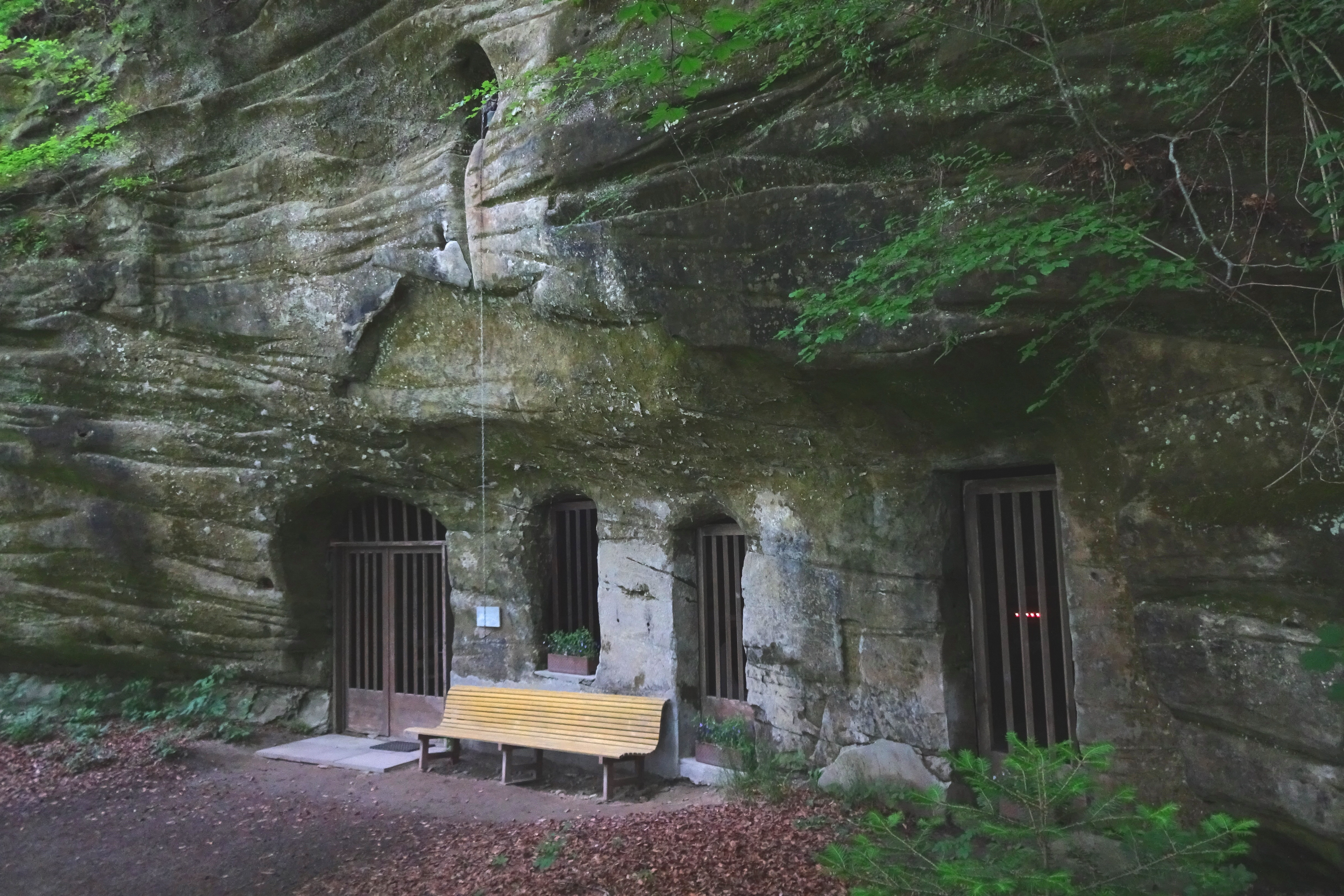
Heitenried, Schlosswald : Rock Chapel of Saint Magdalene (1700, 1707, 1867)

The parish church of St. Michael is listed as a Swiss heritage site of national significance.

== Politics ==
In the 2011 federal election the most popular party was the CVP which received 24.8% of the vote. The next three most popular parties were the SVP (23.3%), the CSP (12.4%) and the SPS (11.7%).

The CVP received about the same percentage of the vote as they did in the 2007 Federal election (29.0% in 2007 vs 24.8% in 2011). The SVP moved from third in 2007 (with 18.4%) to second in 2011, the CSP moved from second in 2007 (with 18.9%) to third and the SPS moved from below fourth place in 2007 to fourth. A total of 506 votes were cast in this election, of which 5 or 1.0% were invalid.

== Economy ==
As of 2010, Heitenried had an unemployment rate of 1.4%. As of 2008, there were 96 people employed in the primary economic sector and about 36 businesses involved in this sector. 44 people were employed in the secondary sector and there were 10 businesses in this sector. 113 people were employed in the tertiary sector, with 27 businesses in this sector. There were 611 residents of the municipality who were employed in some capacity, of which females made up 41.7% of the workforce.

In 2008 the total number of full-time equivalent jobs was 193. The number of jobs in the primary sector was 67, of which 66 were in agriculture and 1 was in forestry or lumber production. The number of jobs in the secondary sector was 43 of which 13 or (30.2%) were in manufacturing and 30 (69.8%) were in construction. The number of jobs in the tertiary sector was 83. In the tertiary sector; 20 or 24.1% were in wholesale or retail sales or the repair of motor vehicles, 7 or 8.4% were in the movement and storage of goods, 11 or 13.3% were in a hotel or restaurant, 2 or 2.4% were in the information industry, 8 or 9.6% were the insurance or financial industry, 14 or 16.9% were technical professionals or scientists, 10 or 12.0% were in education and 3 or 3.6% were in health care.

In 2000, there were 96 workers who commuted into the municipality and 432 workers who commuted away. The municipality is a net exporter of workers, with about 4.5 workers leaving the municipality for every one entering. Of the working population, 9.3% used public transportation to get to work, and 65.6% used a private car.

== Religion ==
From the 2000 census, 747 or 67.8% were Roman Catholic, while 259 or 23.5% belonged to the Swiss Reformed Church. Of the rest of the population, there were 4 members of an Orthodox church (or about 0.36% of the population), and there were 24 individuals (or about 2.18% of the population) who belonged to another Christian church. There were 7 (or about 0.64% of the population) who were Islamic. There were 2 individuals who belonged to another church. 50 (or about 4.54% of the population) belonged to no church, are agnostic or atheist, and 20 individuals (or about 1.82% of the population) did not answer the question.

== Education ==
In Heitenried about 405 or (36.8%) of the population have completed non-mandatory upper secondary education, and 118 or (10.7%) have completed additional higher education (either university or a Fachhochschule). Of the 118 who completed tertiary schooling, 75.4% were Swiss men, 17.8% were Swiss women.

The Canton of Fribourg school system provides one year of non-obligatory Kindergarten, followed by six years of Primary school. This is followed by three years of obligatory lower Secondary school where the students are separated according to ability and aptitude. Following the lower Secondary students may attend a three or four year optional upper Secondary school. The upper Secondary school is divided into gymnasium (university preparatory) and vocational programs. After they finish the upper Secondary program, students may choose to attend a Tertiary school or continue their apprenticeship.

During the 2010-11 school year, there were a total of 147 students attending 8 classes in Heitenried. A total of 233 students from the municipality attended any school, either in the municipality or outside of it. There were 2 kindergarten classes with a total of 33 students in the municipality. The municipality had 6 primary classes and 114 students. During the same year, there were no lower secondary classes in the municipality, but 51 students attended lower secondary school in a neighboring municipality. There were no upper Secondary classes or vocational classes, but there were 21 upper Secondary students and 36 upper Secondary vocational students who attended classes in another municipality. The municipality had no non-university Tertiary classes, but there was one specialized Tertiary student who attended classes in another municipality.

As of 2000, there were 13 students in Heitenried who came from another municipality, while 57 residents attended schools outside the municipality.
