= Tafers =

- Municipality
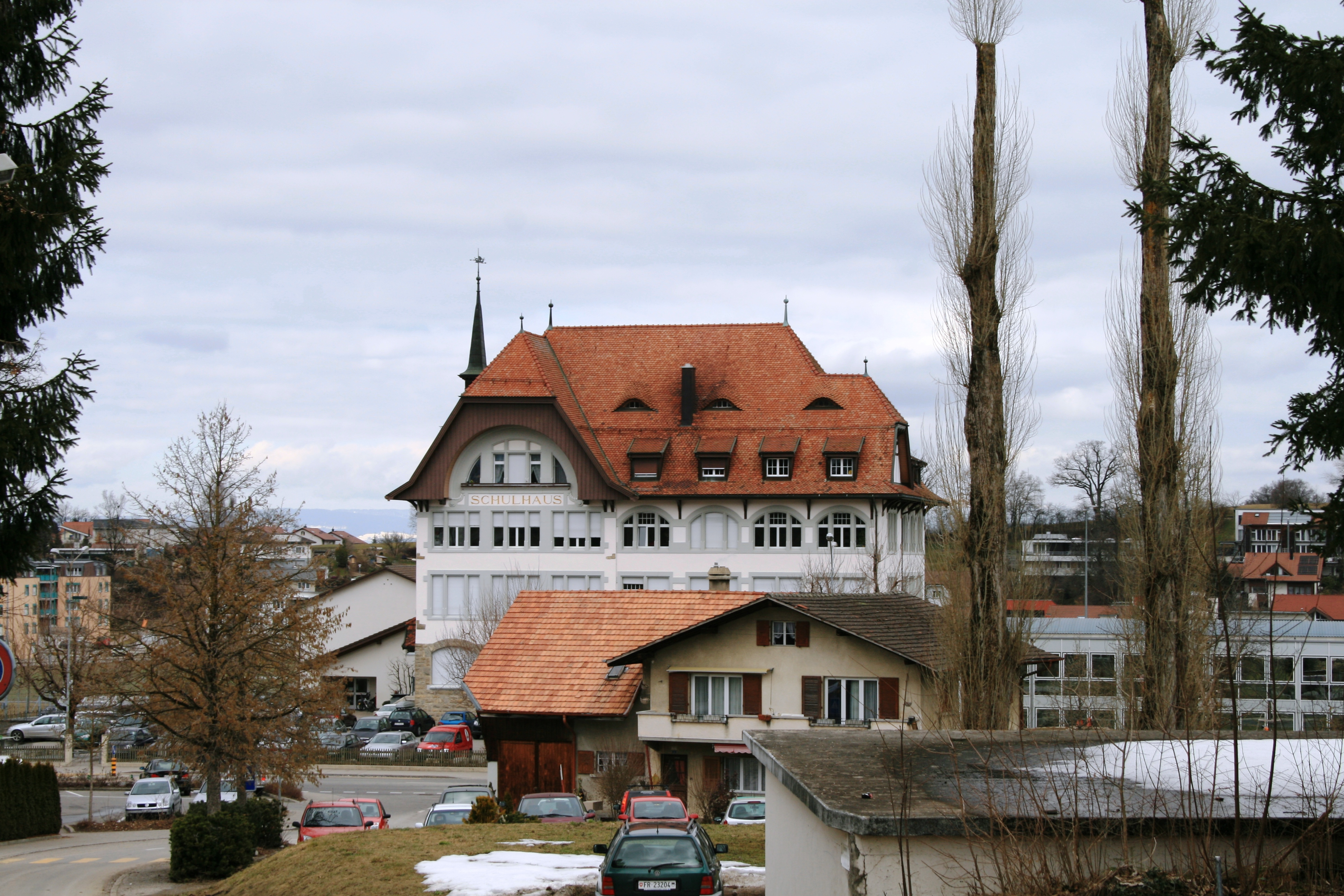

- Flag Coat of arms
- Location of Tafers
- Location within Switzerland Location within Canton of Fribourg
- Coordinates: 46°49′N 7°13′E
- Country: Switzerland
- Canton: Fribourg
- District: Sense

Government
  - Mayor: Gemeindeammann

Area
  - Total: 8.37 km^{2} (3.23 sq mi)
- Elevation: 651 m (2,136 ft)

Population (December 2020)
  - Total: 3,532
  - Density: 422/km^{2} (1,090/sq mi)
- Time zone: UTC+01:00 (CET)
  - Summer (DST): UTC+02:00 (CEST)
- Postal code: 1712
- SFOS number: 2306
- ISO 3166 code: CH-FR
- Surrounded by: Alterswil, Düdingen, Fribourg (Freiburg im Üechtland/Fribourg), Sankt Antoni, Sankt Ursen, Schmitten
- Website: www.tafers.ch

Tafers (French: Tavel [tavɛl]; Arpitan: Tavél [taˈvi]) is a municipality in the district of Sense in the canton of Fribourg in Switzerland. It is one of the municipalities with a large majority of German speakers in the mostly French speaking Canton of Fribourg. On 1 January 2021 the former municipalities of St. Antoni and Alterswil merged into the municipality of Tafers.

== History ==
=== Alterswil ===
Alterswil is first mentioned in 1148 as Alterihcwilere. In 1228 it was mentioned as Vilar Altri.

=== St. Antoni ===
St. Antoni is first mentioned in 1690 as S Antonii.

== Geography ==
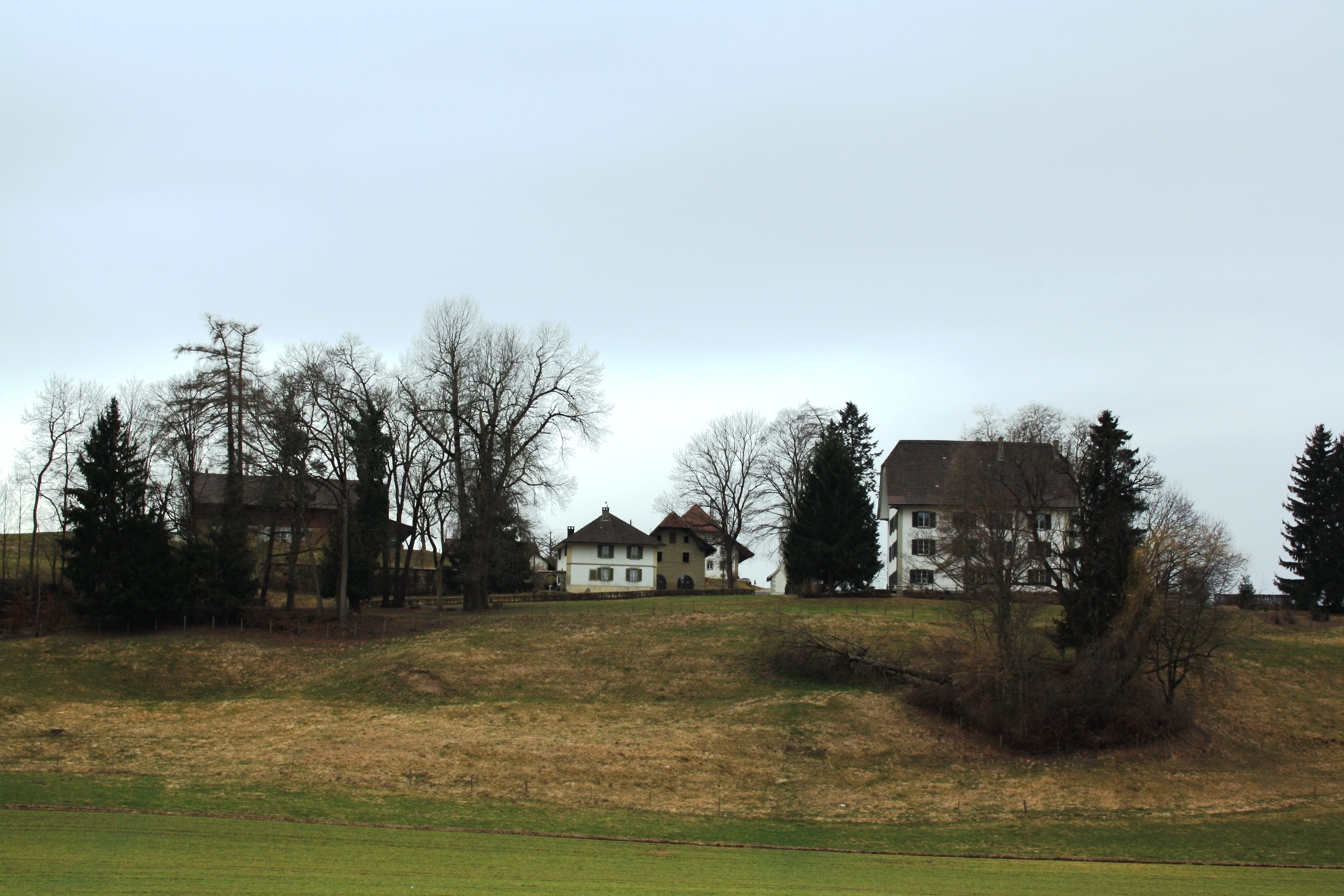
Maggenberg in Tafers

Tafers has an area of 41.3 km^{2} (15.95 sq mi). Of this area, 5.33 km^{2} (2.06 mi^{2}) or 63.5% is used for agricultural purposes, while 1.78 km^{2} (0.69 mi^{2}) or 21.2% is forested. Of the rest of the land, 1.25 km^{2} (0.48 mi^{2}) or 14.9% is settled (buildings or roads) and 0.01 km^{2} (2.5 acres) or 0.1% is unproductive land.

Of the built up area, industrial buildings made up 1.8% of the total area while housing and buildings made up 9.2% and transportation infrastructure made up 3.1%. Out of the forested land, all of the forested land area is covered with heavy forests. Of the agricultural land, 40.0% is used for growing crops and 22.6% is pastures.

== Coat of arms ==
The blazon of the municipal coat of arms is Gules, a Guard statant afrontee clad Azure and Sable ensigned with a Cross on sinister, holding in dexter a Halberd Argent.

== Demographics ==
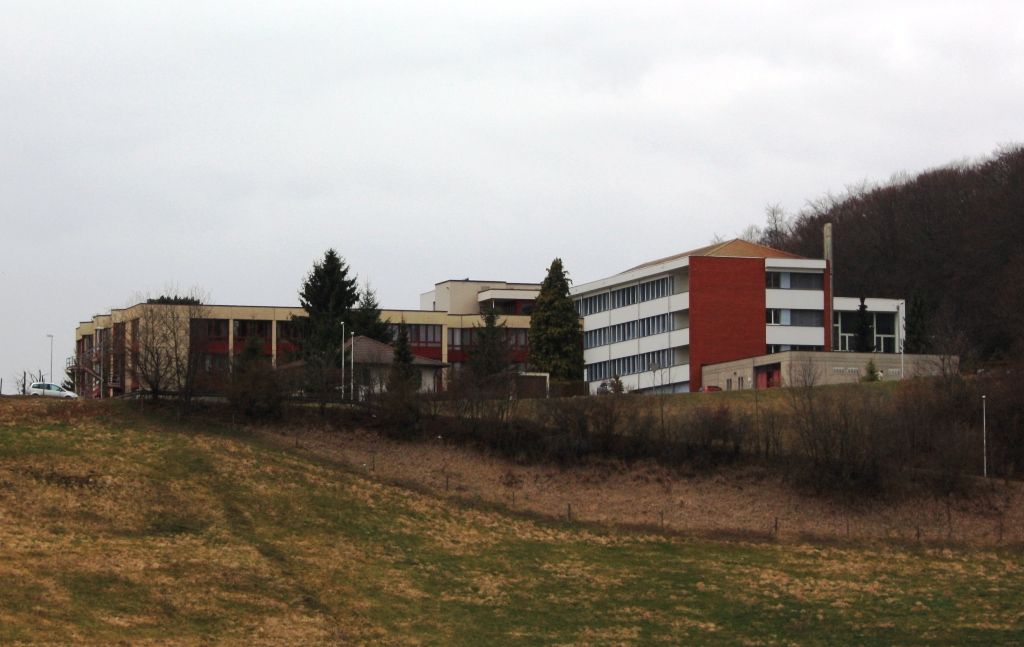
District hospital in Tafers

Aerial view (1964)

Tafers has a population (as of December 2020) of 3,532. As of 2008, 10.8% of the population are resident foreign nationals. Over the last 10 years (2000–2010) the population has changed at a rate of 4.9%. Migration accounted for 7.8%, while births and deaths accounted for 2.4%.

Most of the population (as of 2000) speaks German (2,361 or 89.9%) as their first language, French is the second most common (117 or 4.5%) and Serbo-Croatian is the third (35 or 1.3%). There are 10 people who speak Italian and 1 person who speaks Romansh.

As of 2008, the population was 49.0% male and 51.0% female. The population was made up of 1,255 Swiss men (43.7% of the population) and 154 (5.4%) non-Swiss men. There were 1,313 Swiss women (45.7%) and 151 (5.3%) non-Swiss women. Of the population in the municipality, 847 or about 32.2% were born in Tafers and lived there in 2000. There were 1,089 or 41.5% who were born in the same canton, while 315 or 12.0% were born somewhere else in Switzerland, and 279 or 10.6% were born outside of Switzerland.

As of 2000, children and teenagers (0–19 years old) make up 23.2% of the population, while adults (20–64 years old) make up 60.6% and seniors (over 64 years old) make up 16.2%.

As of 2000, there were 1,099 people who were single and never married in the municipality. There were 1,274 married individuals, 177 widows or widowers and 77 individuals who are divorced.

As of 2000, there were 959 private households in the municipality, and an average of 2.5 persons per household. There were 226 households that consist of only one person and 75 households with five or more people. In 2000, a total of 929 apartments (94.7% of the total) were permanently occupied, while 39 apartments (4.0%) were seasonally occupied and 13 apartments (1.3%) were empty. As of 2009, the construction rate of new housing units was 20.4 new units per 1000 residents. The vacancy rate for the municipality, in 2010, was 5.18%.

== Historic Population ==
The historical population is given in the following chart:

== Heritage sites of national significance ==
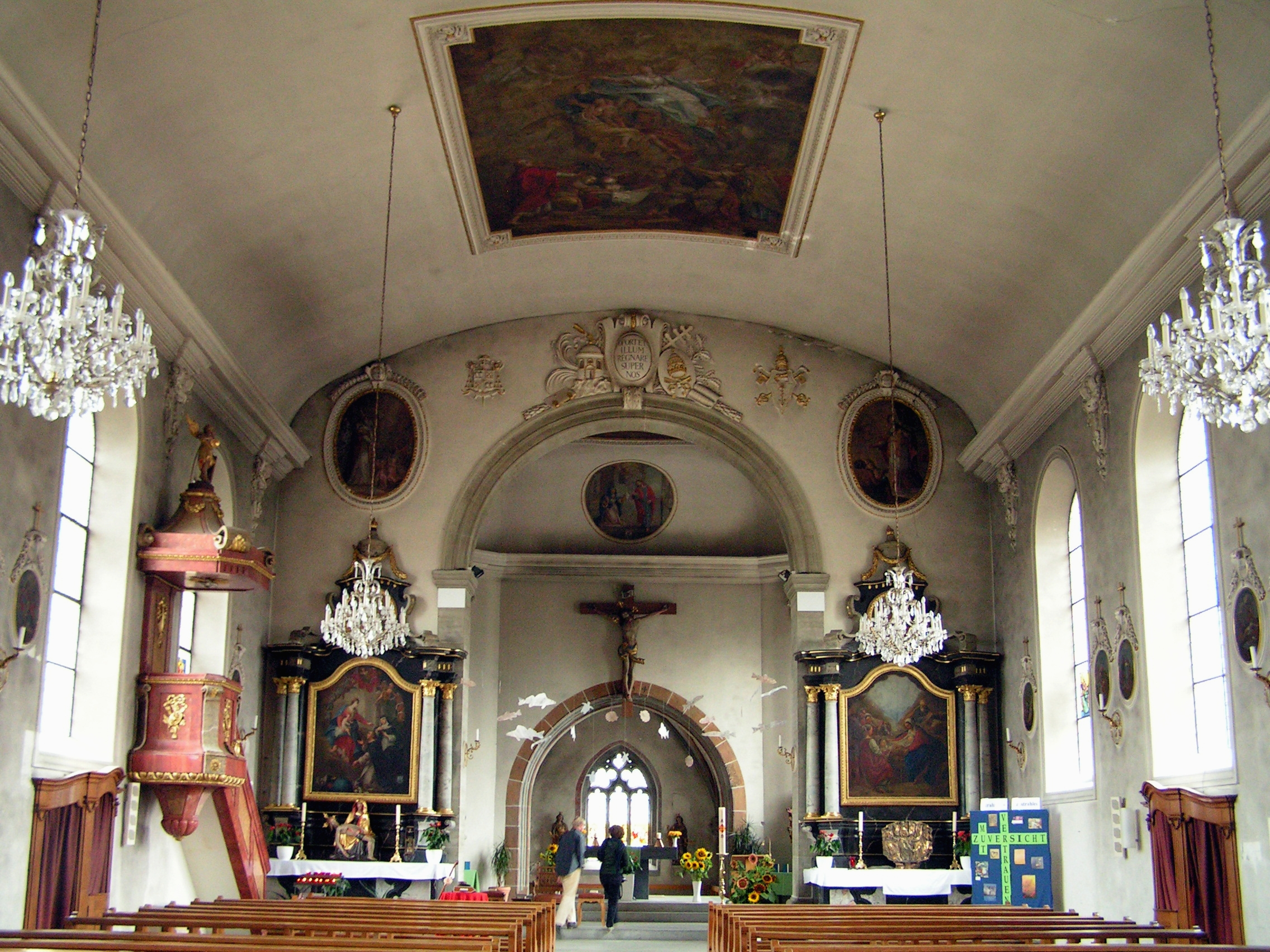
Interior of the parish church of St. Martin

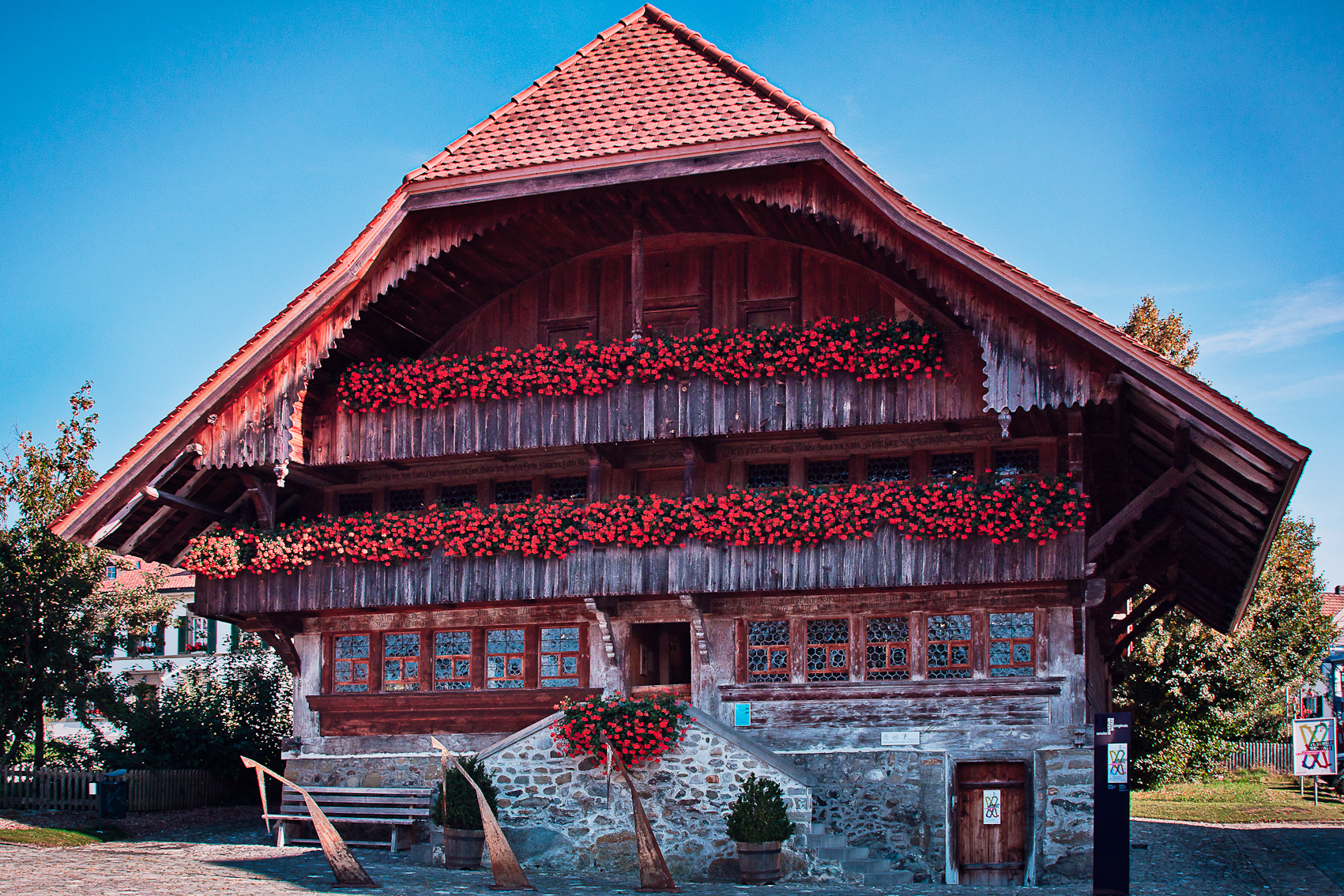
Sigristen House

The Parish Church of St. Martin and the Sigristen House are listed as Swiss heritage site of national significance.

== Politics ==
In the 2011 federal election the most popular party was the CVP which received 26.0% of the vote. The next three most popular parties were the SVP (20.5%), the SPS (19.1%) and the CSP (14.6%).

The CVP received about the same percentage of the vote as they did in the 2007 Federal election (28.9% in 2007 vs 26.0% in 2011). The SVP moved from third in 2007 (with 17.3%) to second in 2011, the SPS moved from fourth in 2007 (with 14.0%) to third and the CSP moved from second in 2007 (with 22.5%) to fourth. A total of 1,249 votes were cast in this election, of which 11 or 0.9% were invalid.

== Economy ==
As of 2010, Tafers had an unemployment rate of 2.1%. As of 2008, there were 66 people employed in the primary economic sector and about 25 businesses involved in this sector. 301 people were employed in the secondary sector and there were 23 businesses in this sector. 1,047 people were employed in the tertiary sector, with 89 businesses in this sector. There were 1,372 residents of the municipality who were employed in some capacity, of which females made up 42.8% of the workforce.

In 2008 the total number of full-time equivalent jobs was 1,110. The number of jobs in the primary sector was 43, all of which were in agriculture. The number of jobs in the secondary sector was 280 of which 156 or (55.7%) were in manufacturing and 67 (23.9%) were in construction. The number of jobs in the tertiary sector was 787. In the tertiary sector; 112 or 14.2% were in wholesale or retail sales or the repair of motor vehicles, 10 or 1.3% were in the movement and storage of goods, 38 or 4.8% were in a hotel or restaurant, 10 or 1.3% were in the information industry, 19 or 2.4% were the insurance or financial industry, 23 or 2.9% were technical professionals or scientists, 57 or 7.2% were in education and 402 or 51.1% were in health care.

In 2000, there were 1,053 workers who commuted into the municipality and 870 workers who commuted away. The municipality is a net importer of workers, with about 1.2 workers entering the municipality for every one leaving. Of the working population, 13.8% used public transportation to get to work, and 60.9% used a private car.

== Religion ==
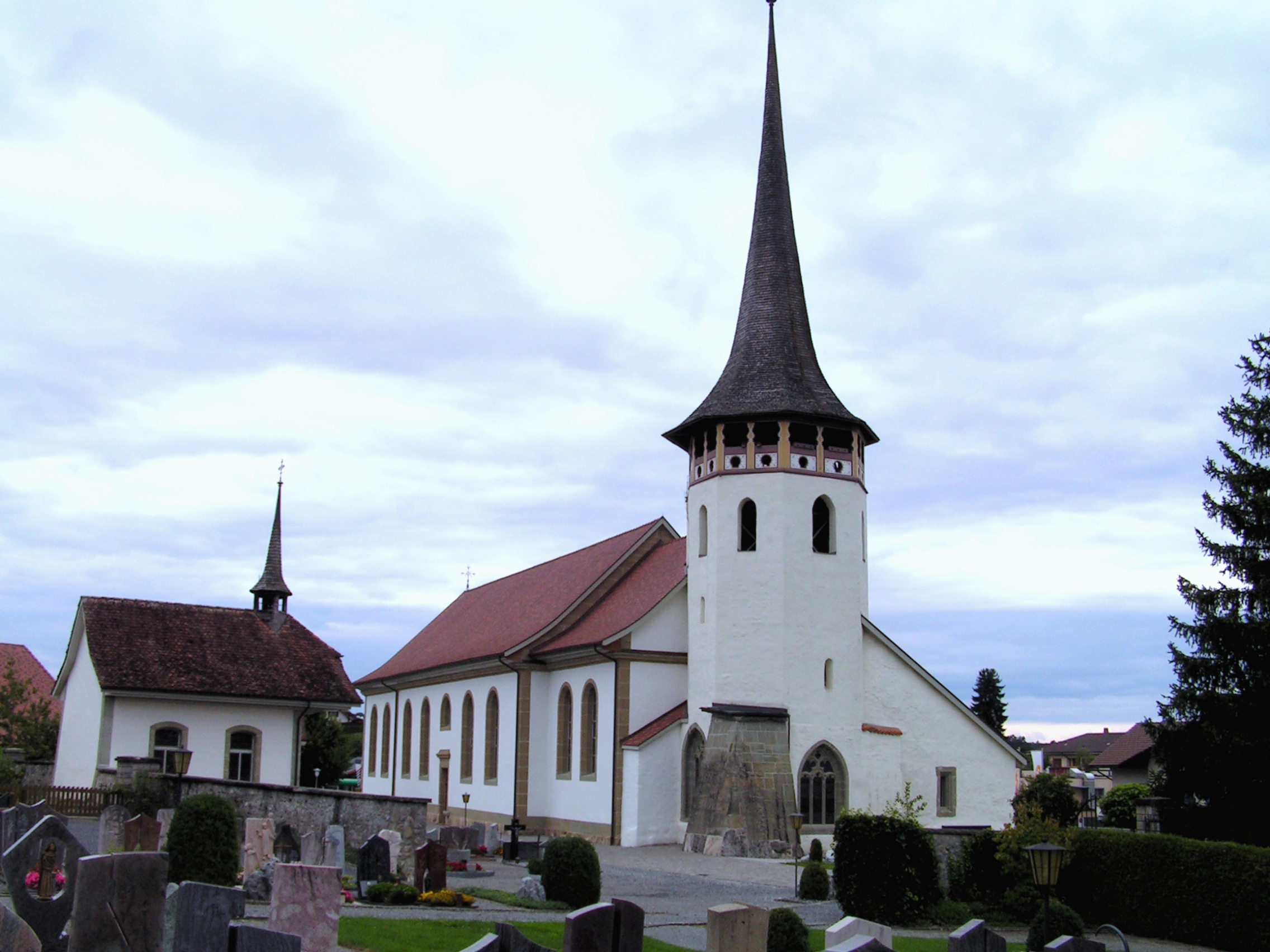
St. Martin's church in Tafers

From the 2000 census, 2,041 or 77.7% were Roman Catholic, while 276 or 10.5% belonged to the Swiss Reformed Church. Of the rest of the population, there were 47 members of an Orthodox church (or about 1.79% of the population), there were 2 individuals (or about 0.08% of the population) who belonged to the Christian Catholic Church, and there were 44 individuals (or about 1.67% of the population) who belonged to another Christian church. There was 1 individual who was Jewish, and 72 (or about 2.74% of the population) who were Islamic. There were 10 individuals who were Hindu and 2 individuals who belonged to another church. 76 (or about 2.89% of the population) belonged to no church, are agnostic or atheist, and 75 individuals (or about 2.85% of the population) did not answer the question.

== Education ==
In Tafers about 908 or (34.6%) of the population have completed non-mandatory upper secondary education, and 361 or (13.7%) have completed additional higher education (either university or a Fachhochschule). Of the 361 who completed tertiary schooling, 64.5% were Swiss men, 22.4% were Swiss women, 7.2% were non-Swiss men and 5.8% were non-Swiss women.

The Canton of Fribourg school system provides one year of non-obligatory Kindergarten, followed by six years of Primary school. This is followed by three years of obligatory lower Secondary school where the students are separated according to ability and aptitude. Following the lower Secondary students may attend a three or four year optional upper Secondary school. The upper Secondary school is divided into gymnasium (university preparatory) and vocational programs. After they finish the upper Secondary program, students may choose to attend a Tertiary school or continue their apprenticeship.

During the 2010–11 school year, there were a total of 653 students attending 36 classes in Tafers. A total of 463 students from the municipality attended any school, either in the municipality or outside of it. There were 4 kindergarten classes with a total of 75 students in the municipality. The municipality had 9 primary classes and 177 students. During the same year, there were 23 lower secondary classes with a total of 401 students. There were no upper Secondary classes or vocational classes, but there were 70 upper Secondary students and 44 upper Secondary vocational students who attended classes in another municipality. The municipality had no non-university Tertiary classes, but there were 2 specialized Tertiary students who attended classes in another municipality.

As of 2000, there were 370 students in Tafers who came from another municipality, while 111 residents attended schools outside the municipality.
