= Lütold =

Lütold, Leuthold or Lüthold is a German name, popular in the High Middle Ages.

Historical individuals:

- Lütold of Rümligen, founded Rüeggisberg Priory (1072)
- Lütold of St. Gallen, Abbot from 1077–1033 in St. Gall
- Lutold of Znaim (died 1112)
- Lüthold of Sumiswald, founder of Sumiswald castle (1225)
- Lütold of Houwinstein (13th century)
- Lütold of Griesenberg, gave possessions to Fischingen monastery in 1316
- Leuthold I of Rotheln, bishop of Basel (died 1213)
- Lütold I of Aarburg, bishop of Basel (died 1249)
- lords of Regensberg:
  - Lütold of Affoltern (11th century)
  - Lütold II and his son Lütold III, founder of the Fahr Abbey (1130)
  - Lütold IV, founder of the Rüti Monastery (1206)
  - Lütold V, founder of the castle and the town of Regensberg (1244)
  - Lütold VI, disputed the possession of Regensberg by his brother Ulrich 1267/1268, married Gertrud, daughter of Rudolf III of Habsburg
  - Lütold VII (sold Regensberg in 1302)
  - Lütold VIII (died 1326)

Leuthold and Lüthold survive as a surname into modern times. The name is also seen in variant forms such as Leutholdt, Leutholt and Leutelt.

- Juan M. Leuthold, Swiss businessman
- Juerg Leuthold, German engineer
- Gustav Leutelt, Bohemian German poet
- Hans Leutelt, Czech cyclist
