= Rümligen =

- Former municipality
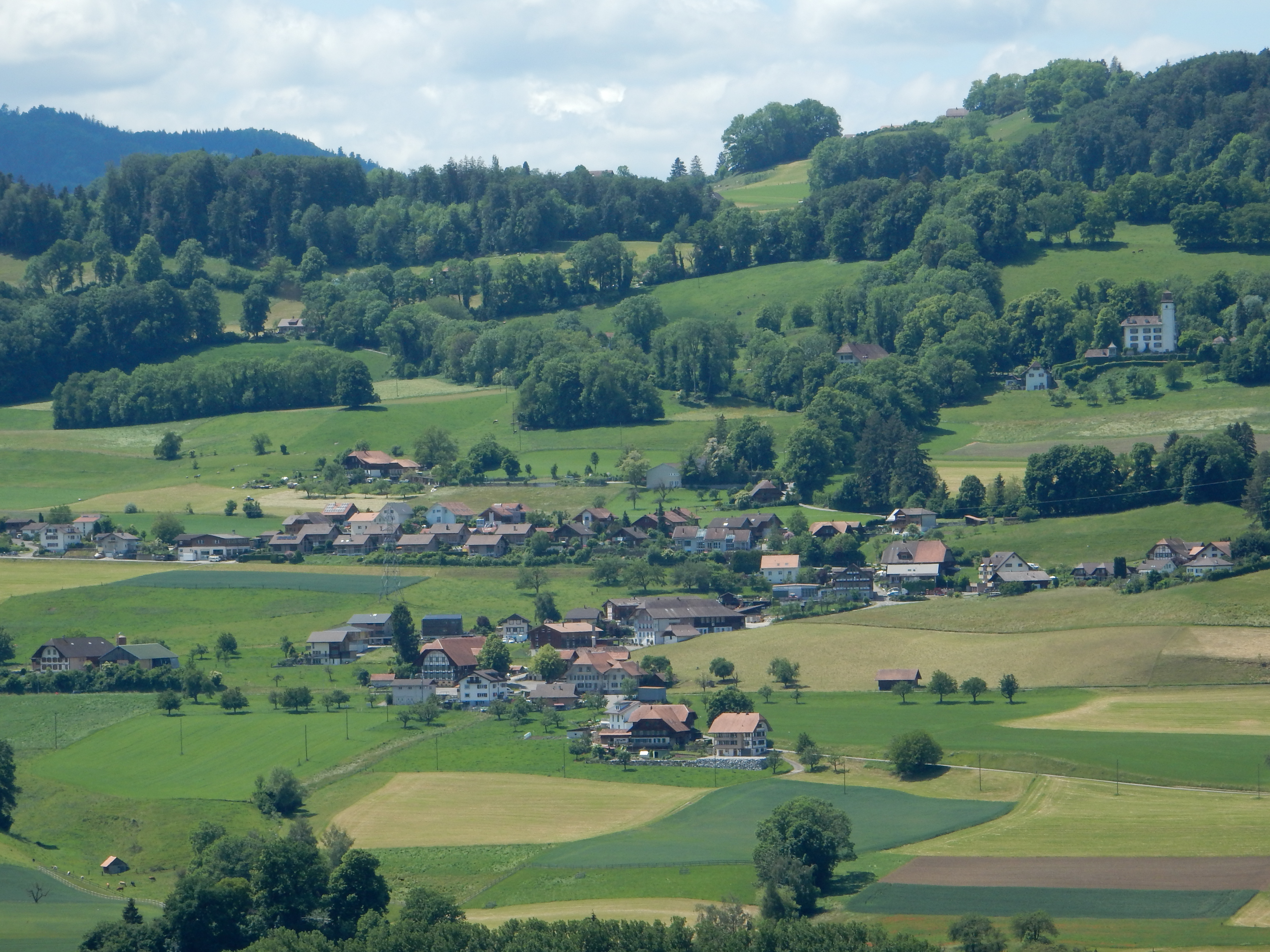
- Rümligen Castle in Rümligen

- Flag Coat of arms
- Location of Rümligen
- Location within Switzerland Location within Canton of Bern
- Coordinates: 46°50′N 7°30′E
- Country: Switzerland
- Canton: Bern
- District: Bern-Mittelland

Government
  - Mayor: Martin Studer

Area
  - Total: 4.7 km^{2} (1.8 sq mi)
- Elevation: 606 m (1,988 ft)

Population (Dec 2019)
  - Total: 466
  - Density: 99/km^{2} (260/sq mi)
- Time zone: UTC+01:00 (CET)
  - Summer (DST): UTC+02:00 (CEST)
- Postal code: 3128
- SFOS number: 0881
- ISO 3166 code: CH-BE
- Surrounded by: Gelterfingen, Kaufdorf, Kirchenthurnen, Riggisberg, Rüeggisberg
- Website: www.ruemligen.ch

Rümligen is a former municipality in the Bern-Mittelland administrative district in the canton of Bern in Switzerland. On 1 January 2021 the former municipality of Rümligen merged into Riggisberg.

== History ==
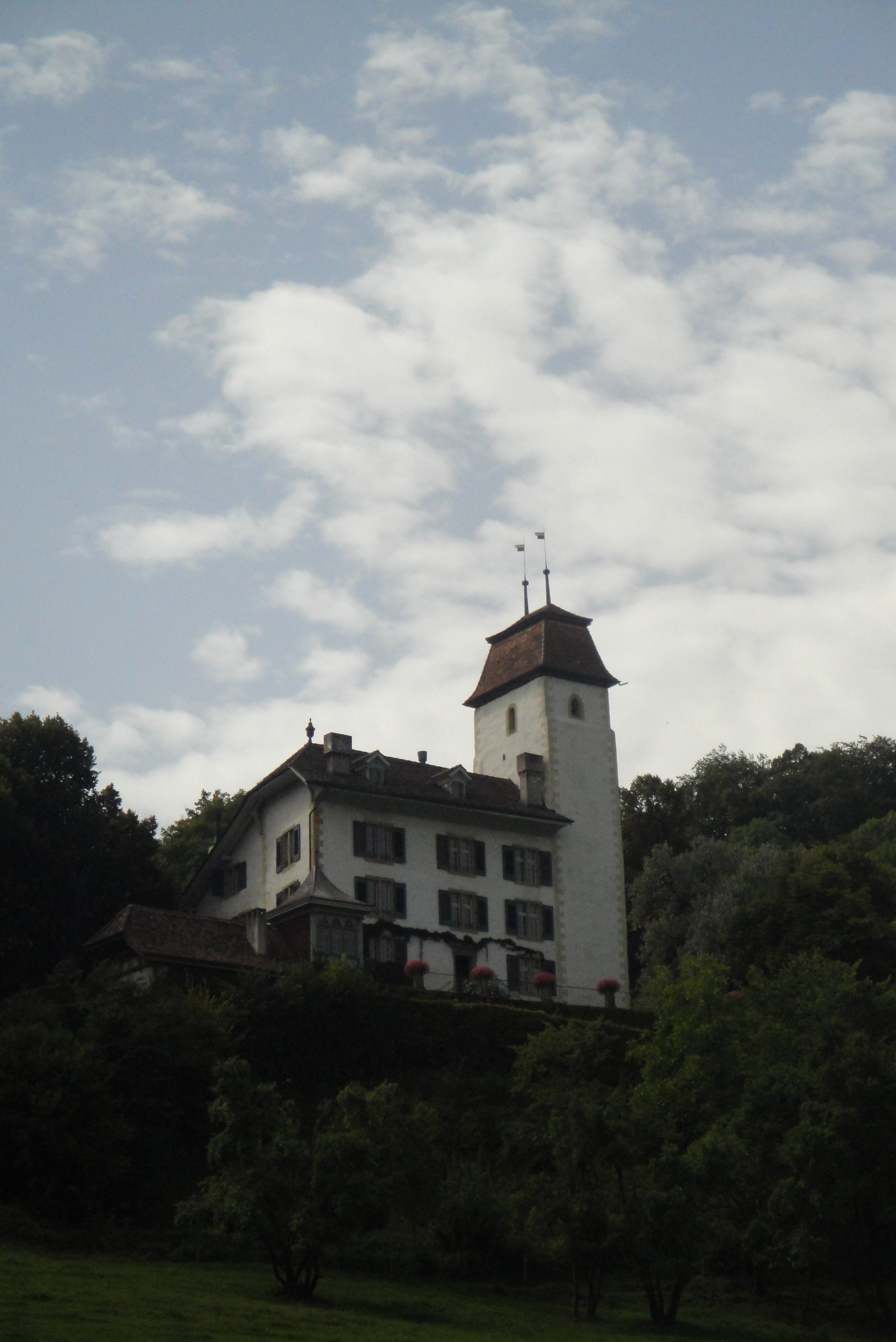
Rümligen Castle

Rümligen is first mentioned in 1075 as Rumelingen.

The oldest trace of a settlement in the area is a cache of Early-Bronze Age axes. During the High Middle Ages the Freiherr von Rümligen owned a vast swathe of land between the Gürbe and Sense rivers. They donated some of their estates to found and support Rüeggisberg and Röthenbach Priories. In 1380 the Sommerau-Rümligen family inherited the land when Alisa von Rümligen married into the Sommerau family. In 1388 the Freiherren came under Bernese control, though they continued to own the estates for another century and a half. In 1515 the Sommerau-Rümligen lost the Herrschaft and by the 17th century a series of Bernese patrician families owned Rümligen. In 1709 Samuel Frisching, built the modern Rümligen Castle around the core of the medieval castle.

The village has always been part of the large parish of Thurnen.

The local farmers raised crops on the valley floor and pastured cattle in seasonal alpine camps. Today a large minority (43%) of the local jobs are still in agriculture. About two-thirds of the work force commutes to jobs in nearby cities. The municipal association runs a small school in the village.

== Geography ==
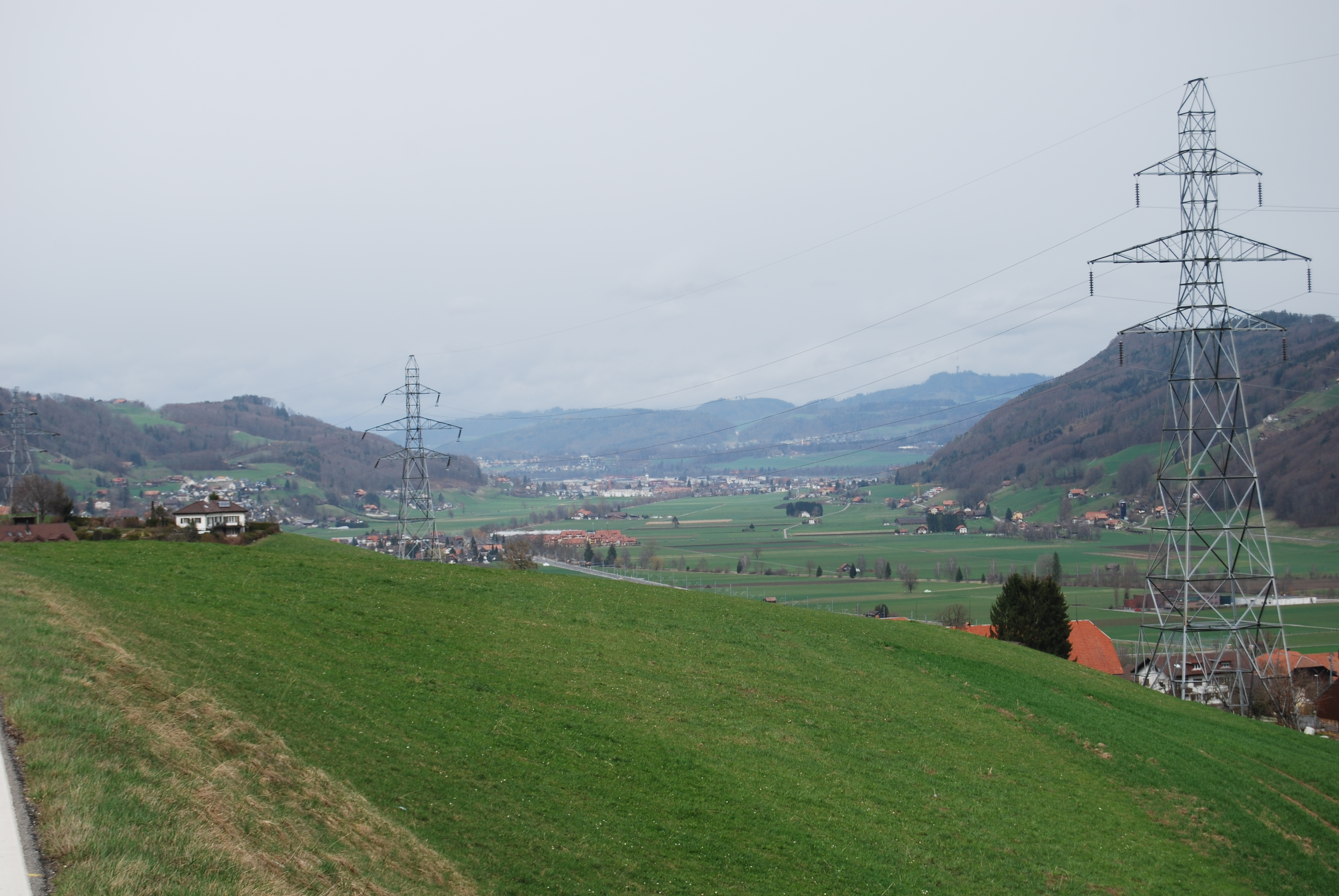
View of the Gürbe Valley from Rümligen

Rümligen had an area of 4.66 km^{2} (1.80 sq mi). As of 2012, a total of 3.51 km^{2} (1.36 mi^{2}) or 75.5% is used for agricultural purposes, while 0.77 km^{2} (0.30 mi^{2}) or 16.6% is forested. The rest of the municipality is 0.35 km^{2} (0.14 mi^{2}) or 7.5% is settled (buildings or roads), 0.02 km^{2} (4.9 acres) or 0.4% is either rivers or lakes.

During the same year, housing and buildings made up 4.3% and transportation infrastructure made up 2.6%. A total of 11.8% of the total land area is heavily forested and 4.7% is covered with orchards or small clusters of trees. Of the agricultural land, 35.1% is used for growing crops and 37.4% is pasturage, while 3.0% is used for orchards or vine crops. All the water in the municipality is flowing water.

The former municipality is located in the Gürbetal or Gürbe Valley near Längenberg mountain. It consists of the village of Rümligen and the hamlets of Hermiswil and Hasli as well as scattered farmhouses.

On 31 December 2009 Amtsbezirk Seftigen, the municipality's former district, was dissolved. On the following day, 1 January 2010, it joined the newly created Verwaltungskreis Bern-Mittelland.

== Coat of arms ==
The blazon of the municipal coat of arms is Per fess Argent and Gules two Mullets in pale counterchanged.

== Demographics ==
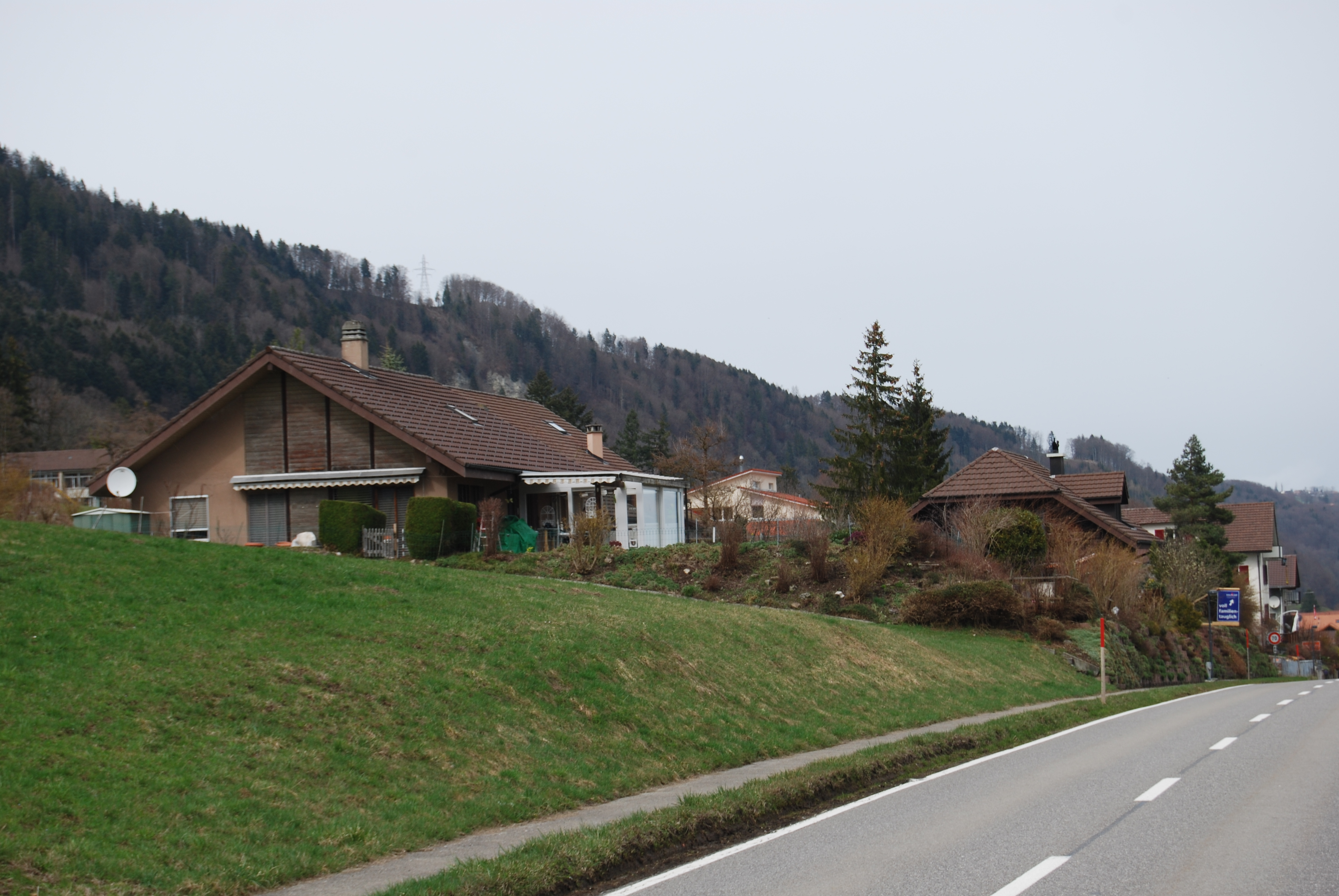
Houses in Rümligen village

Rümligen had a population (as of 2019) of 437. As of 2012, 5.3% of the population are resident foreign nationals. Over the last 2 years (2010-2012) the population has changed at a rate of -1.6%. Migration accounted for -3.8%, while births and deaths accounted for 1.3%.

Most of the population (as of 2000) speaks German (433 or 96.7%) as their first language, French is the second most common (4 or 0.9%) and Italian is the third (2 or 0.4%).

As of 2008, the population was 51.7% male and 48.3% female. The population was made up of 219 Swiss men (49.2% of the population) and 11 (2.5%) non-Swiss men. There were 206 Swiss women (46.3%) and 9 (2.0%) non-Swiss women. Of the population in the municipality, 128 or about 28.6% were born in Rümligen and lived there in 2000. There were 225 or 50.2% who were born in the same canton, while 50 or 11.2% were born somewhere else in Switzerland, and 20 or 4.5% were born outside of Switzerland.

As of 2012, children and teenagers (0–19 years old) make up 18.0% of the population, while adults (20–64 years old) make up 65.8% and seniors (over 64 years old) make up 16.2%.

As of 2000, there were 202 people who were single and never married in the municipality. There were 212 married individuals, 22 widows or widowers and 12 individuals who are divorced.

As of 2010, there were 44 households that consist of only one person and 13 households with five or more people. In 2000, a total of 153 apartments (86.0% of the total) were permanently occupied, while 17 apartments (9.6%) were seasonally occupied and 8 apartments (4.5%) were empty. The vacancy rate for the municipality, in 2013, was 3.2%. In 2011, single family homes made up 47.1% of the total housing in the municipality.

The historical population is given in the following chart:

== Heritage sites of national significance ==
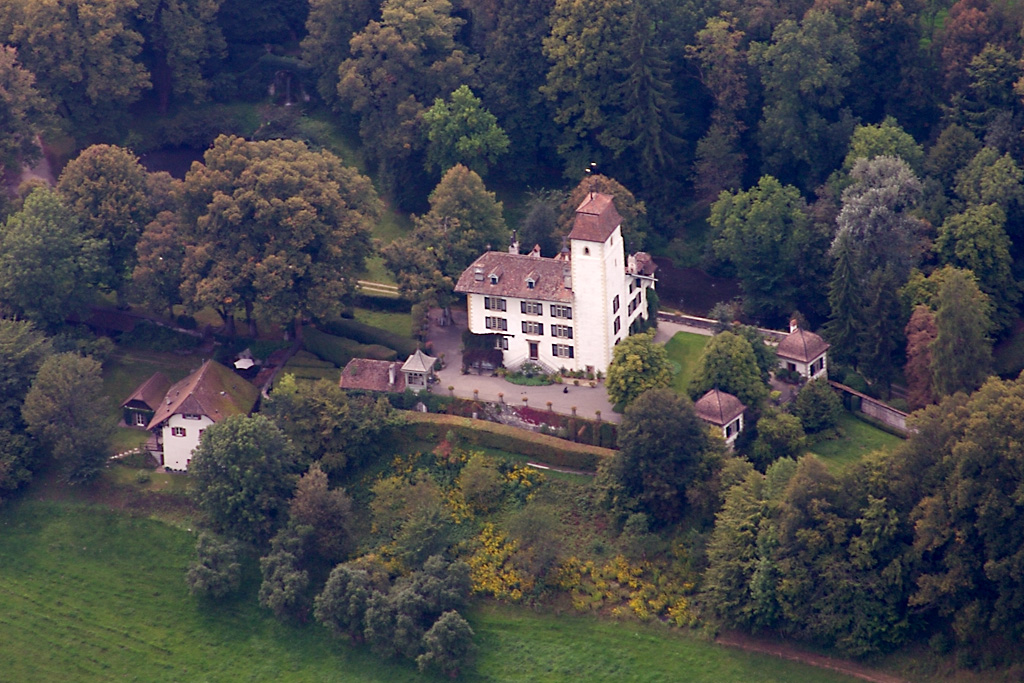
Rümligen Castle

Rümligen Castle is listed as a Swiss heritage site of national significance.

== Politics ==
In the 2011 federal election the most popular party was the Swiss People's Party (SVP) which received 37.4% of the vote. The next three most popular parties were the Conservative Democratic Party (BDP) (20.0%), the Social Democratic Party (SP) (13.4%) and the Green Party (8.1%). In the federal election, a total of 191 votes were cast, and the voter turnout was 52.9%.

== Economy ==
As of 2011, Rümligen had an unemployment rate of 1.14%. As of 2011, there were a total of 124 people employed in the municipality. Of these, there were 62 people employed in the primary economic sector and about 20 businesses involved in this sector. 27 people were employed in the secondary sector and there were 8 businesses in this sector. 35 people were employed in the tertiary sector, with 15 businesses in this sector. There were 221 residents of the municipality who were employed in some capacity, of which females made up 40.7% of the workforce.

In 2008 there were a total of 103 full-time equivalent jobs. The number of jobs in the primary sector was 42, all of which were in agriculture. The number of jobs in the secondary sector was 21 of which 4 or (19.0%) were in manufacturing and 17 (81.0%) were in construction. The number of jobs in the tertiary sector was 40. In the tertiary sector; 13 or 32.5% were in wholesale or retail sales or the repair of motor vehicles, 8 or 20.0% were in a hotel or restaurant, 12 or 30.0% were technical professionals or scientists, 3 or 7.5% were in education.

In 2000, there were 44 workers who commuted into the municipality and 145 workers who commuted away. The municipality is a net exporter of workers, with about 3.3 workers leaving the municipality for every one entering. A total of 76 workers (63.3% of the 120 total workers in the municipality) both lived and worked in Rümligen. Of the working population, 8.1% used public transportation to get to work, and 54.8% used a private car.

In 2011 the average local and cantonal tax rate on a married resident, with two children, of Rümligen making 150,000 CHF was 12.4%, while an unmarried resident's rate was 18.2%. For comparison, the average rate for the entire canton in the same year, was 14.2% and 22.0%, while the nationwide average was 12.3% and 21.1% respectively.

In 2009 there were a total of 221 tax payers in the municipality. Of that total, 69 made over 75,000 CHF per year. The average income of the over 75,000 CHF group in Rümligen was 108,297 CHF, while the average across all of Switzerland was 130,478 CHF.

In 2011 a total of 1.1% of the population received direct financial assistance from the government.

== Religion ==
From the 2000 census, 345 or 77.0% belonged to the Swiss Reformed Church, while 28 or 6.3% were Roman Catholic. Of the rest of the population, there was 1 member of an Orthodox church, and there were 29 individuals (or about 6.47% of the population) who belonged to another Christian church. 34 (or about 7.59% of the population) belonged to no church, are agnostic or atheist, and 11 individuals (or about 2.46% of the population) did not answer the question.

== Education ==
In Rümligen about 63.5% of the population have completed non-mandatory upper secondary education, and 15.2% have completed additional higher education (either university or a Fachhochschule). Of the 41 who had completed some form of tertiary schooling listed in the census, 85.4% were Swiss men, 7.3% were Swiss women.

The Canton of Bern school system provides one year of non-obligatory Kindergarten, followed by six years of Primary school. This is followed by three years of obligatory lower Secondary school where the students are separated according to ability and aptitude. Following the lower Secondary students may attend additional schooling or they may enter an apprenticeship.

During the 2011-12 school year, there were a total of 15 students attending classes in Rümligen. There were no kindergarten classes in the municipality. The municipality had one primary class for all 15 students. Of the primary students, 6.7% were permanent or temporary residents of Switzerland (not citizens).

As of 2000, there were a total of 40 students attending any school in the municipality. Of those, 40 both lived and attended school in the municipality, while 33 students from Rümligen attended schools outside the municipality. During the same year, 33 residents attended schools outside the municipality.
