= Rümligen Castle =

Castle in Bern, Switzerland

- Schloss Rümligen
- Rümligen
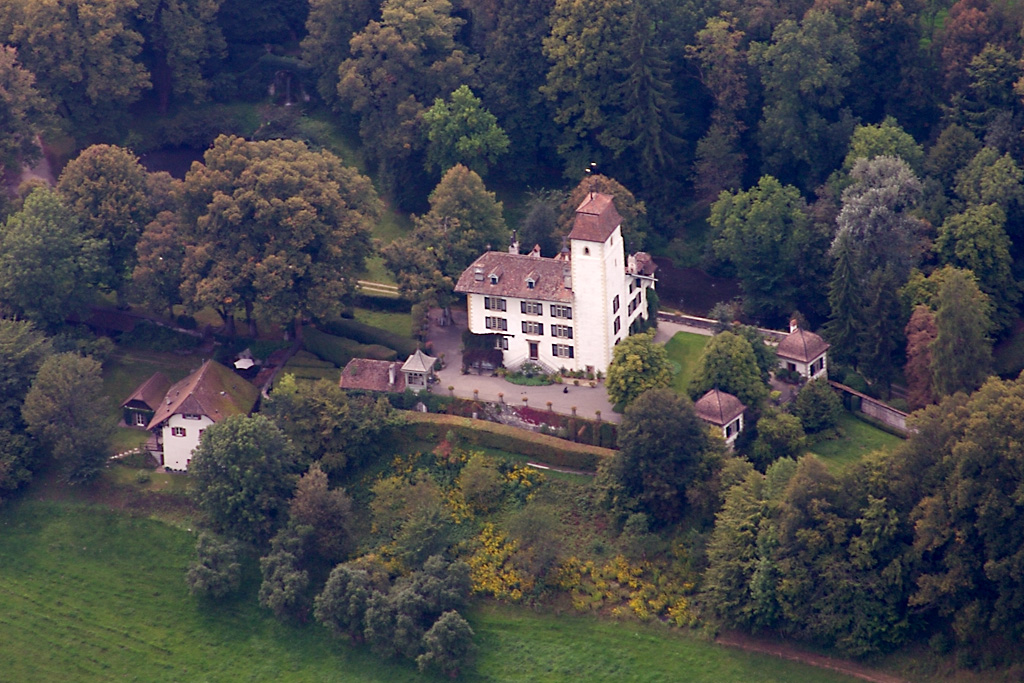
- Rümligen Castle

Site information
- Owner: Privately owned
- Open to the public: no

Location
- Coordinates: 46.829282°N 7.48987°E

Site history
- Built: Around 1076

Swiss Cultural Property of National Significance

Rümligen Castle is a castle in the municipality of Rümligen of the Canton of Bern in Switzerland. It is a Swiss heritage site of national significance.

== History ==
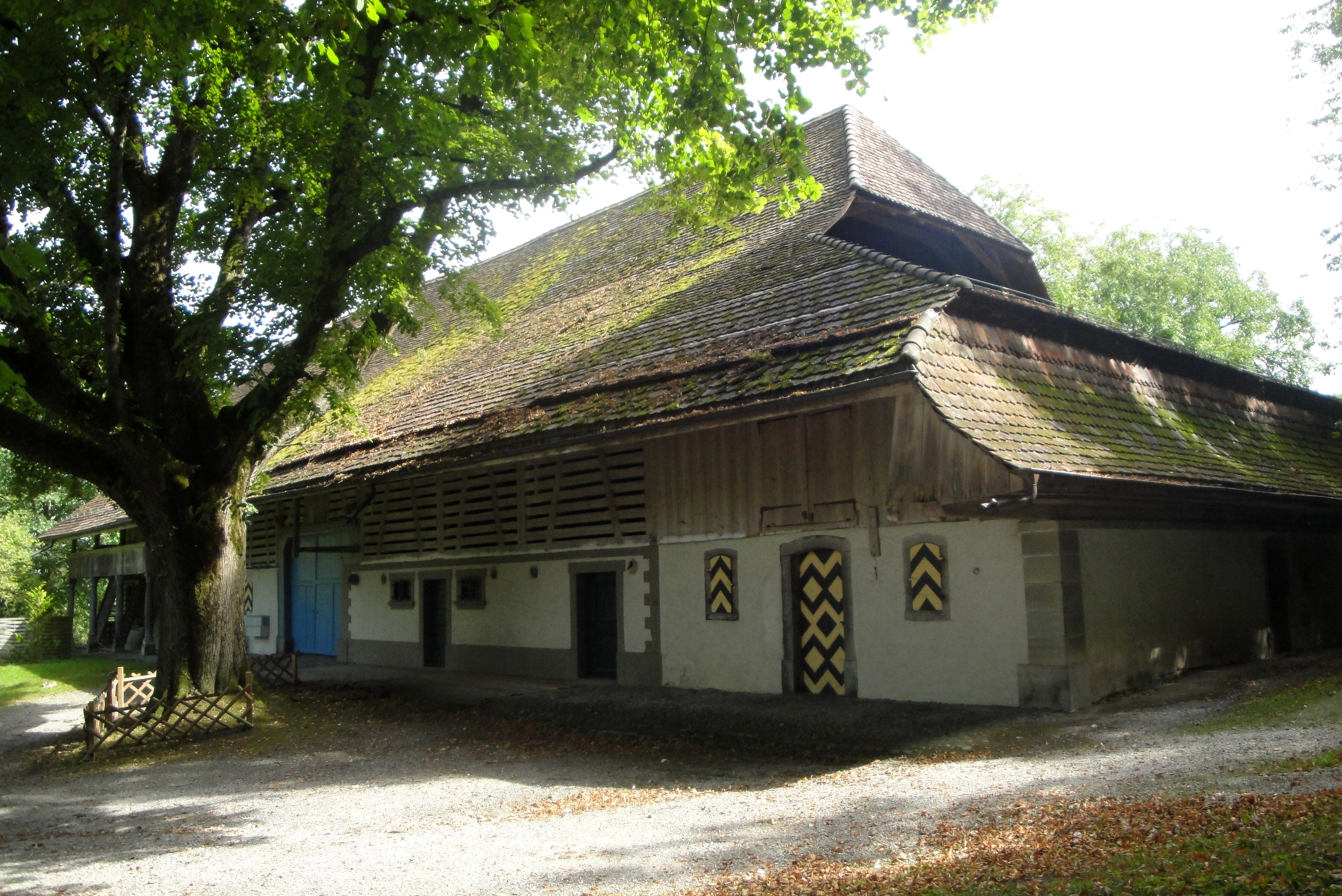
One of the outbuildings of the castle

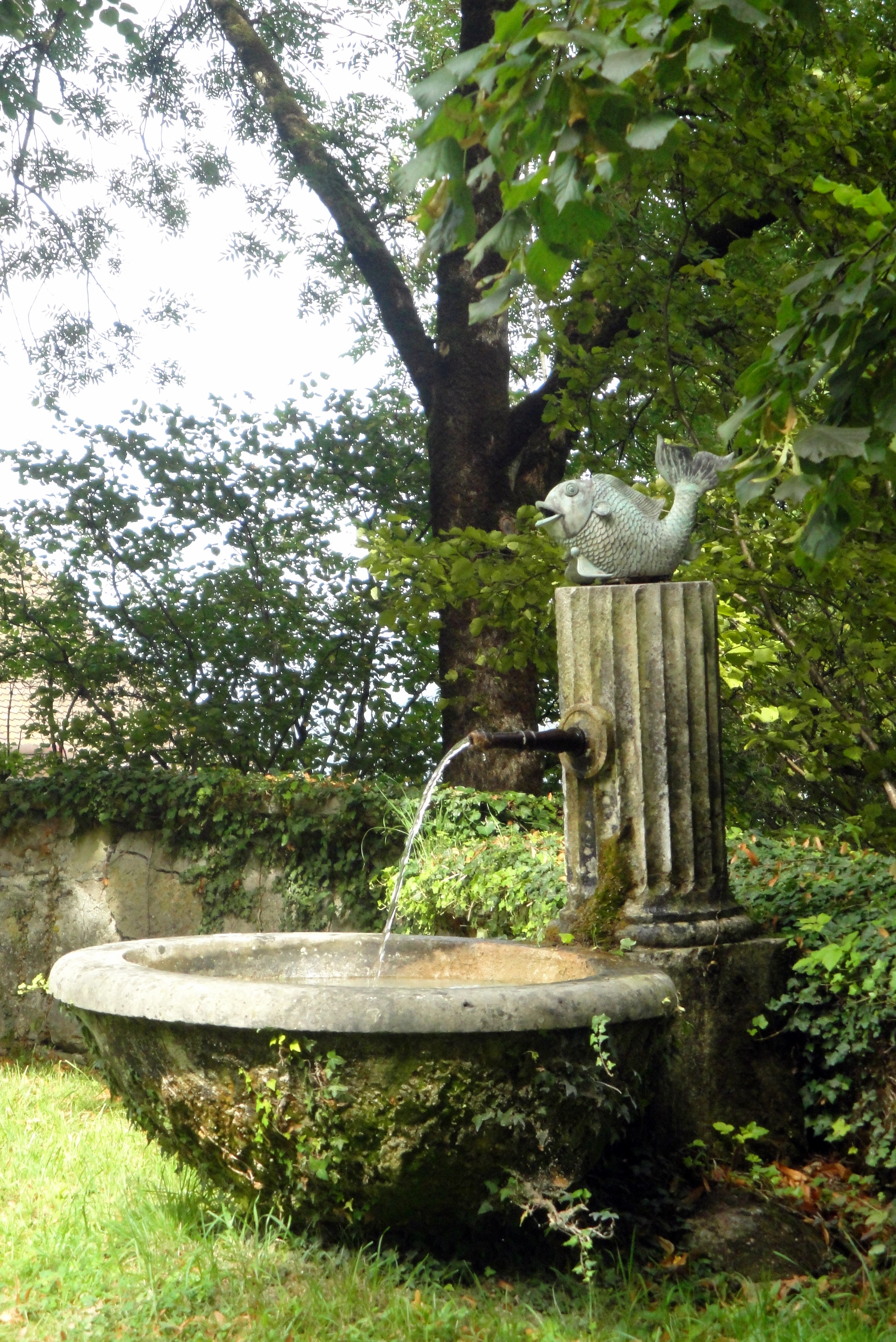
A fountain in the castle gardens

During the High Middle Ages the Freiherr von Rümligen owned a vast swathe of land between the Gürbe and Sense rivers. The first appearance of the family in the historical record is in 1076 when Lütold von Rümligen founded Rüeggisberg Priory. By the 13th century they were allied with Bern and in 1320–21 Berchtold von Rümligen (1294–1337) was the Schultheiss in Bern. The Simmental and Summerau lines of the Rümligen family eventually split off and gained extensive lands of their own.

In 1380, the Sommerau-Rümligen family merged back into the main line and inherited the land when Alisa von Rümligen married Peter von Sommerau. In 1388 the Freiherren came under Bernese control, though they continued to own the estates for another century and a half. Gilian von Sommerau-Rümligen was the grandson of Peter and a bailiff in several Bernese cities. He was also a Bernese captain in the Battle of Nancy in 1447. However, his descendants quickly became impoverished and sold the Herrschaft of Rümligen to Bern for 370 pounds. The last Freiherr von Rümligen died unmarried in 1579.

By the 17th century a series of Bernese patrician families owned Rümligen. After passing through a couple of owners, in 1634 Johann Rudolf von Erlach bought the castle and estates. His grandson sold it in 1680 to Ferdinand von Wattenwyl. They sold the castle to Samuel Frisching who passed it on to his son Samuel Frisching (II) when he died in 1683. In 1709, Samuel Frisching (II) built a new Baroque castle around the medieval core. Frisching had a distinguished career. In 1712 as the head of the Bernese War Council he commanded the Protestant Bernese troops to victory in the Toggenburg War. In 1715 he was elected Schultheiss of Bern, an office he held until his death on 23 October 1723.

Following the 1798 French invasion and the creation of the Helvetic Republic the owners of the castle retained it by lost their manorial rights over the villagers. Rümligen remained with the Frisching family until the marriage of Alette Sophie Rosine Frisching to Friedrich von Wattenwyl von Bursinel in 1838. Following the death of their son, Friedrich von Wattenwyl in 1877, the castle was inherited by Dr. Ludwig Moritz Albert Tscharner who often lived at the castle until his death in 1927.

== Castle appearance ==
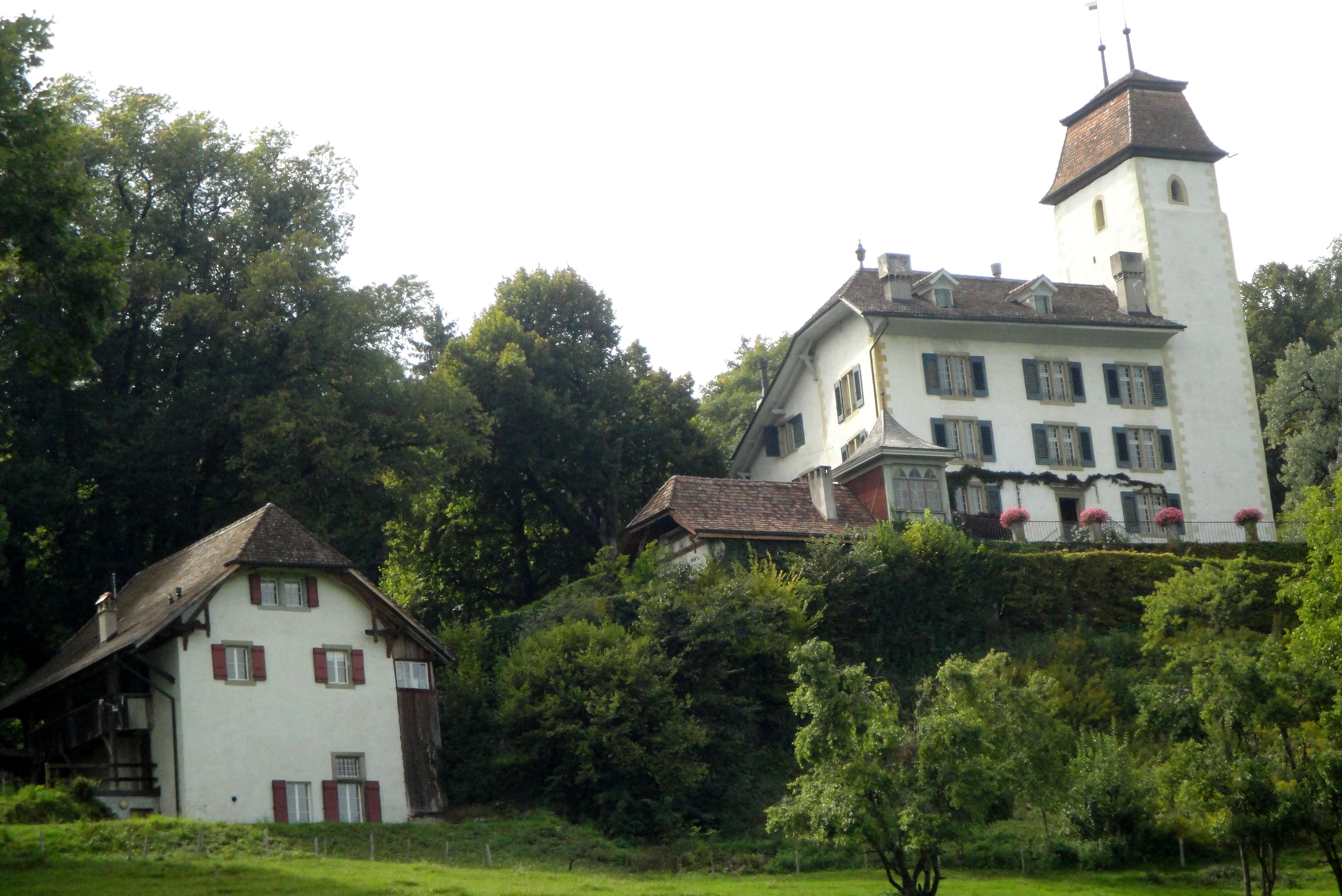
Rümligen Castle and outbuilding

The medieval tower is still visible above the castle, though it was given a Baroque mansard roof in the 18th century. It is possible that the medieval castle was built on or included a much earlier, Roman era watch tower. The residential wing to the south of the tower is probably also medieval, but was extensively rebuilt at the same time. The tower and wing partly enclose a garden and courtyard which were cut into the hill side.

== See also ==
- List of castles in Switzerland
