= Kaufdorf =

- Municipality
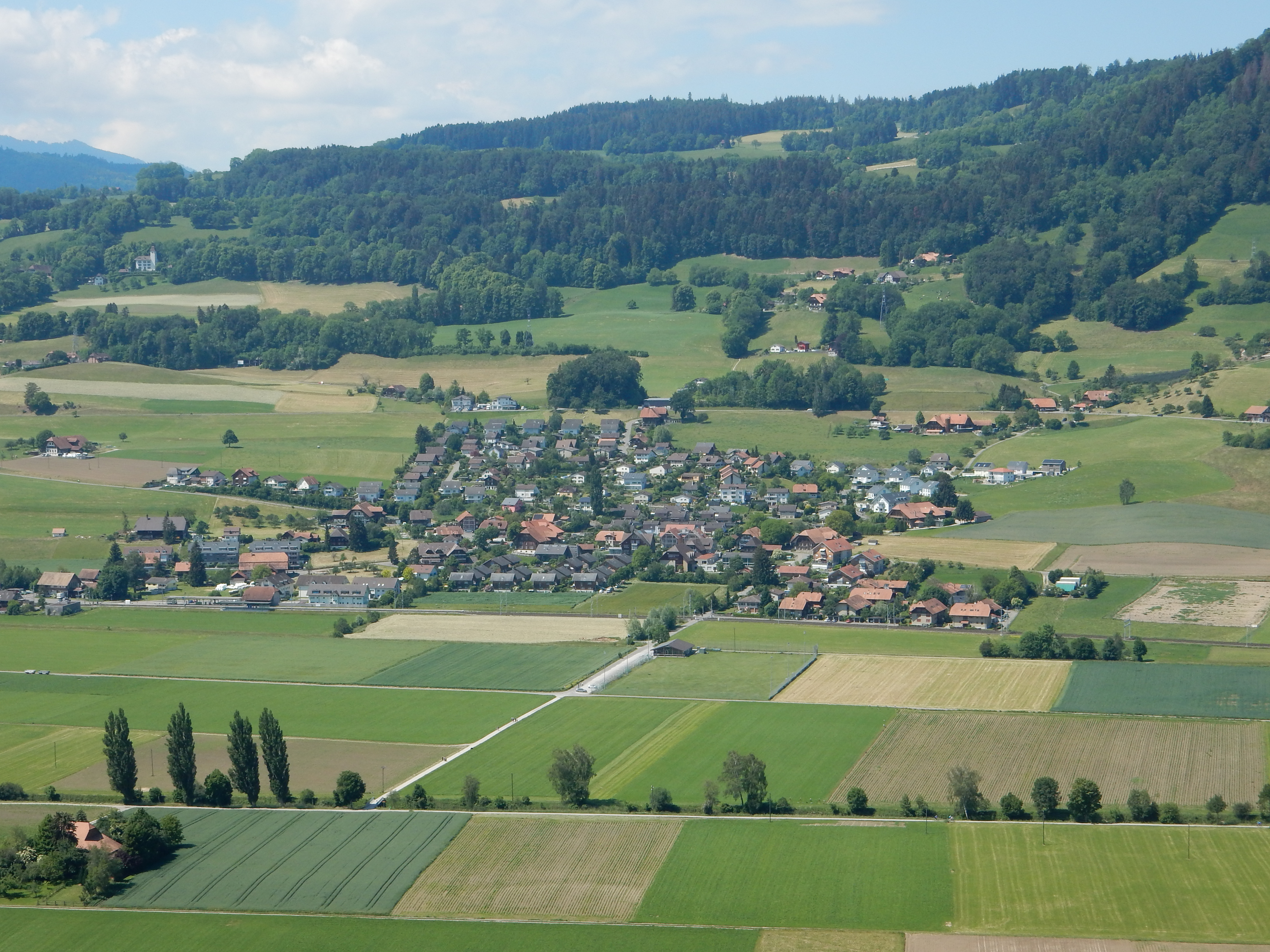
- Kaufdorf

- Flag Coat of arms
- Location of Kaufdorf
- Location within Switzerland Location within Canton of Bern
- Coordinates: 46°50′N 7°29′E
- Country: Switzerland
- Canton: Bern
- District: Bern-Mittelland

Government
  - Executive: Gemeinderat
  - Mayor: Gemeindepräsident; Patrick Goetschi (as of 2026)
  - Parliament: TBD

Area
  - Total: 2.1 km^{2} (0.81 sq mi)
- Elevation: 560 m (1,840 ft)

Population (December 2020)
  - Total: 1,073
  - Density: 510/km^{2} (1,300/sq mi)
- Time zone: UTC+01:00 (CET)
  - Summer (DST): UTC+02:00 (CEST)
- Postal code: 3126
- SFOS number: 869
- ISO 3166 code: CH-BE
- Surrounded by: Gelterfingen, Rüeggisberg, Rümligen, Toffen
- Website: www.kaufdorf.ch

Kaufdorf is a municipality in the Bern-Mittelland administrative district in the canton of Bern in Switzerland.

== History ==
Kaufdorf is first mentioned in 1148 as Cuffedorf.

The village of Kaufdorf first appears in a record in 1319 when it was part of the Herrschaft of Burgistein. It was acquired by the vom Stein family and then in 1386 by the Spilmann family. They eventually donated the village to the Inselspital monastery in Bern. When Bern adopted the new faith of the Protestant Reformation in 1528, the monastery was secularized and the city acquired Kaufdorf.

The village has always been part of the large parish of Thurnen. In 1495 the St. Ursus Chapel was built in the village. However it eventually was abandoned and is now in ruins.

Between 1855 and 1911 a series of projects helped drain the marshy land along the Gürbe river and opened up new farm land. In 1901 the Gürbetal railroad (now part of the BLS) built a station in Kaufdorf. The railroad opened up the village and allowed businesses to move in and residents to commute out. Beginning in the 1970s the new neighborhoods of Trümlere and Rohrmatt were built for the growing population of commuters.

== Kaufdorf vehicle graveyard ==
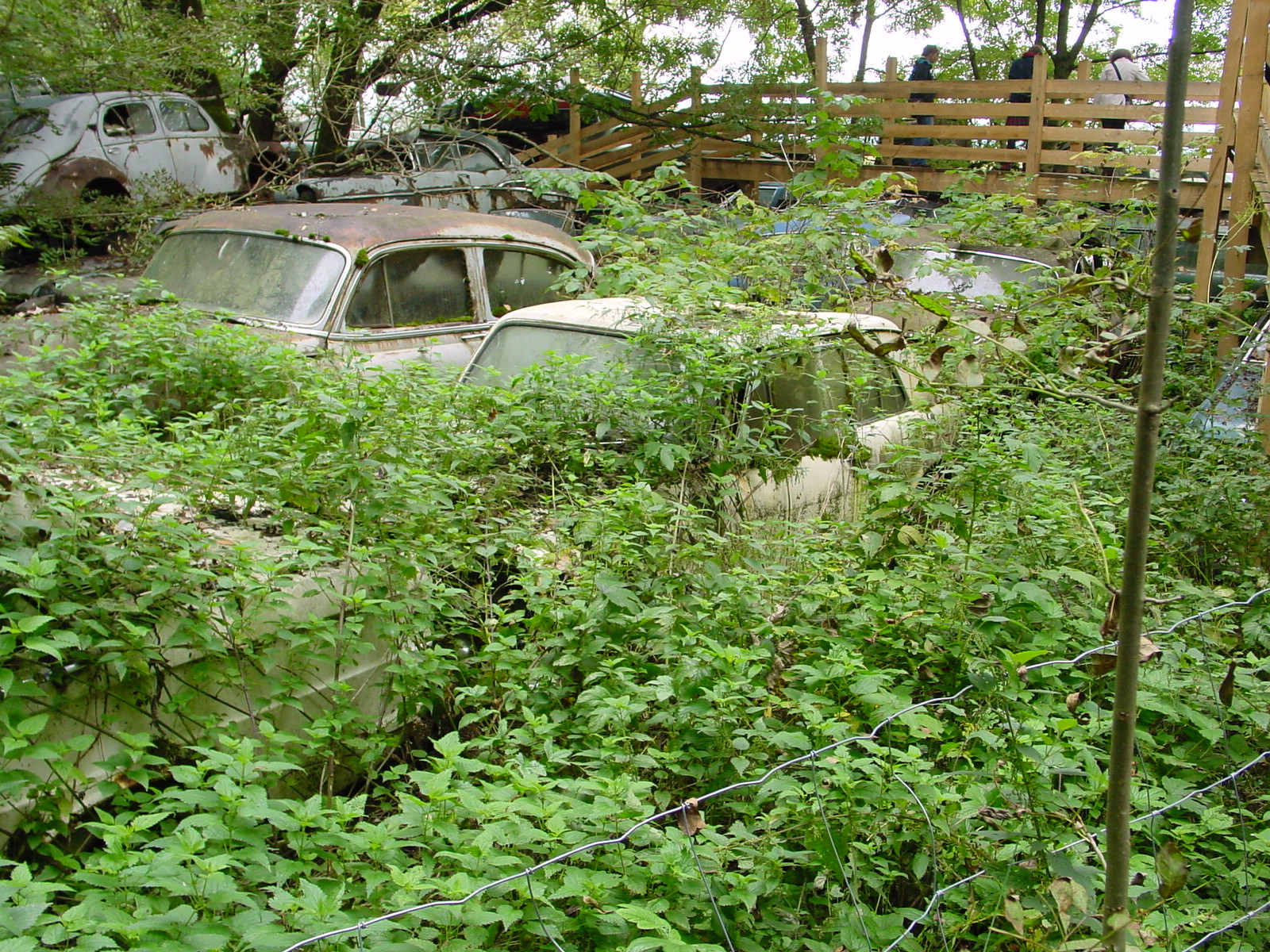
The graveyard in 2008

Around 1933, a Kaufdorf resident, Walter Messerli, began collecting cars for parts. Once usable parts were stripped from vehicles, he stored the empty shells on his land and allowed the forest to grow around them. By the 1970s, when he retired, there were several hundred rusting automobile bodies on his lot. His son took over the yard and continued adding vehicles. Eventually, about 1000 automobiles and 400 motorcycles occupied the yard. In 2008 a Swiss court ordered the vehicles removed and by 2009 most had been auctioned off, sold or removed and scrapped.

== Geography ==
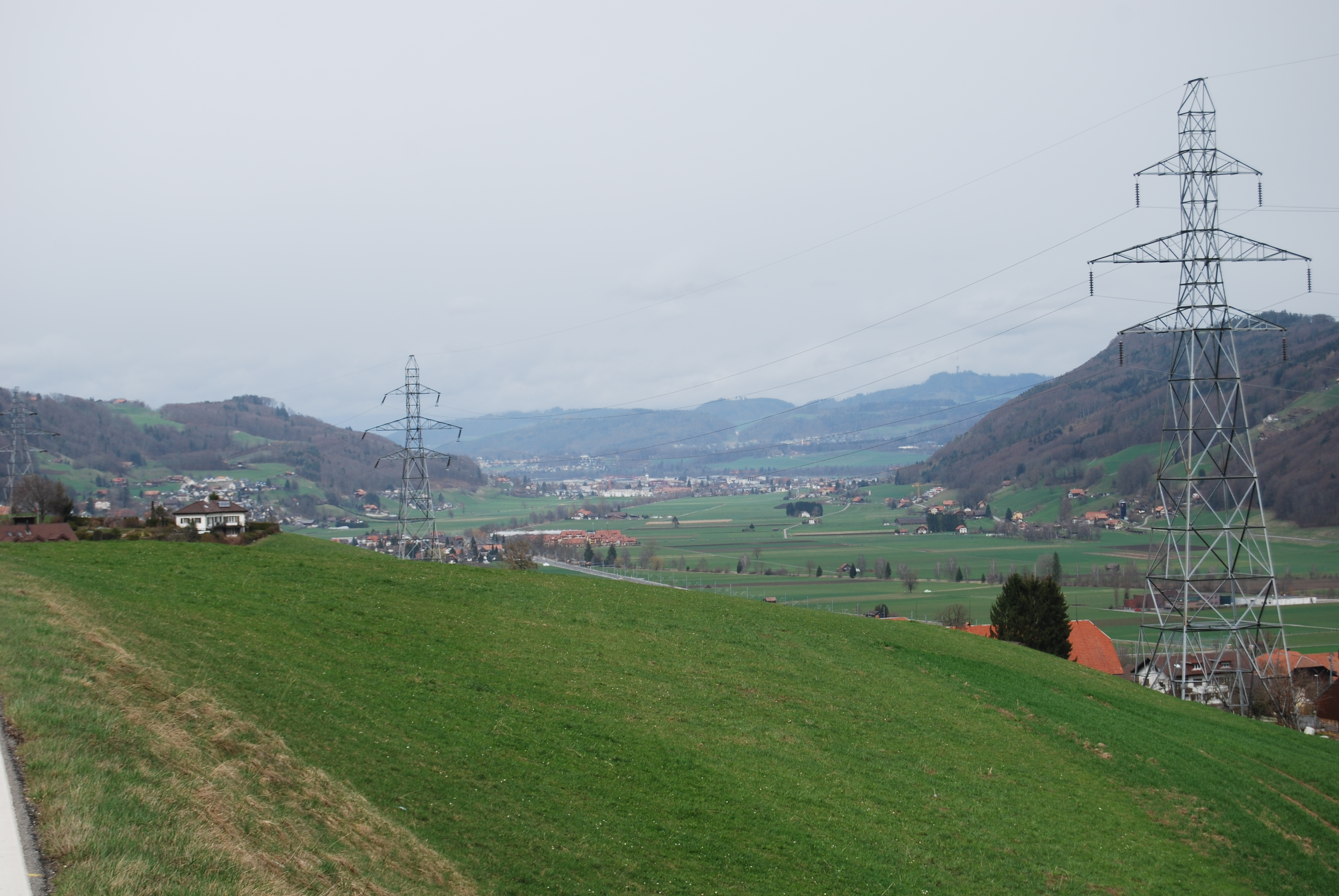
Gürbe Valley with Kaufdorf, Gelterfingen and Toffen.

Kaufdorf has an area of 2.06 km^{2} (0.80 sq mi). As of 2012, a total of 1.35 km^{2} (0.52 mi^{2}) or 65.5% is used for agricultural purposes, while 0.3 km^{2} (0.12 mi^{2}) or 14.6% is forested. The rest of the municipality is 0.42 km^{2} (0.16 mi^{2}) or 20.4% is settled (buildings or roads), 0.03 km^{2} (7.4 acres) or 1.5% is either rivers or lakes.

During the same year, industrial buildings made up 2.4% of the total area while housing and buildings made up 8.7% and transportation infrastructure made up 8.3%. All of the forested land area is covered with heavy forests. Of the agricultural land, 34.0% is used for growing crops and 27.2% is pasturage, while 4.4% is used for orchards or vine crops. All the water in the municipality is flowing water.

The municipality is located in the Gürbetal and on Längenberg mountain. It consists of the villages of Kaufdorf and Gutenbrünnen along with scattered farms.

On 31 December 2009 Amtsbezirk Seftigen, the municipality's former district, was dissolved. On the following day, 1 January 2010, it joined the newly created Verwaltungskreis Bern-Mittelland.

== Coat of arms ==
The blazon of the municipal coat of arms is Per fess Gules a Ram's Head guardant Argent and of the last a Trefoil Vert.

== Demographics ==
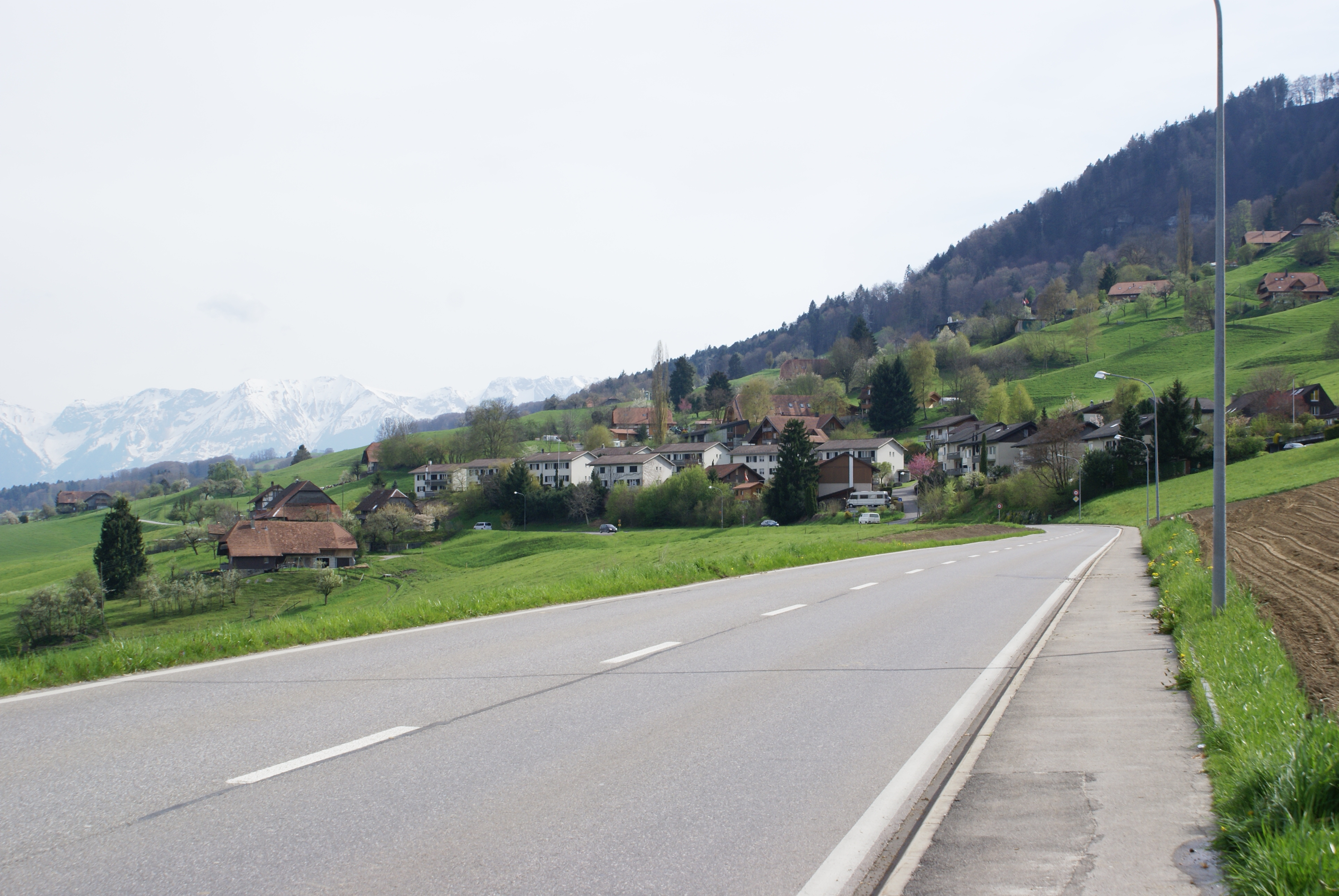
Kaufdorf village

Kaufdorf has a population (as of December 2020) of 1,073. As of 2012, 8.7% of the population are resident foreign nationals. Over the last 2 years (2010-2012) the population has changed at a rate of 1.8%. Migration accounted for 0.7%, while births and deaths accounted for 0.8%.

Most of the population (as of 2000) speaks German (753 or 95.3%) as their first language, Albanian is the second most common (13 or 1.6%) and French is the third (6 or 0.8%). There is 1 person who speaks Italian and 1 person who speaks Romansh.

As of 2008, the population was 49.7% male and 50.3% female. The population was made up of 458 Swiss men (44.5% of the population) and 53 (5.2%) non-Swiss men. There were 475 Swiss women (46.2%) and 43 (4.2%) non-Swiss women. Of the population in the municipality, 179 or about 22.7% were born in Kaufdorf and lived there in 2000. There were 382 or 48.4% who were born in the same canton, while 145 or 18.4% were born somewhere else in Switzerland, and 67 or 8.5% were born outside of Switzerland.

As of 2012, children and teenagers (0–19 years old) make up 24.3% of the population, while adults (20–64 years old) make up 61.5% and seniors (over 64 years old) make up 14.1%.

As of 2000, there were 319 people who were single and never married in the municipality. There were 400 married individuals, 46 widows or widowers and 25 individuals who are divorced.

As of 2010, there were 93 households that consist of only one person and 24 households with five or more people. In 2000, a total of 317 apartments (94.9% of the total) were permanently occupied, while 10 apartments (3.0%) were seasonally occupied and 7 apartments (2.1%) were empty. The vacancy rate for the municipality, in 2013, was 2.3094688222%. In 2011, single family homes made up 68.2% of the total housing in the municipality.

The historical population is given in the following chart:

== Politics ==
In the 2011 federal election the most popular party was the Swiss People's Party (SVP) which received 28.3% of the vote. The next three most popular parties were the Social Democratic Party (SP) (20.6%), the Conservative Democratic Party (BDP) (15.2%) and the Green Party (10.3%). In the federal election, a total of 472 votes were cast, and the voter turnout was 63.9%.

== Economy ==
As of 2011, Kaufdorf had an unemployment rate of 1.31%. As of 2011, there were a total of 187 people employed in the municipality. Of these, there were 30 people employed in the primary economic sector and about 12 businesses involved in this sector. 61 people were employed in the secondary sector and there were 14 businesses in this sector. 96 people were employed in the tertiary sector, with 40 businesses in this sector. There were 435 residents of the municipality who were employed in some capacity, of which females made up 43.9% of the workforce.

In 2008 there were a total of 130 full-time equivalent jobs. The number of jobs in the primary sector was 25, all of which were in agriculture. The number of jobs in the secondary sector was 51 of which 2 or (3.9%) were in manufacturing and 45 (88.2%) were in construction. The number of jobs in the tertiary sector was 54. In the tertiary sector; 5 or 9.3% were in wholesale or retail sales or the repair of motor vehicles, 6 or 11.1% were in the movement and storage of goods, 9 or 16.7% were in a hotel or restaurant, 3 or 5.6% were in the information industry, 8 or 14.8% were technical professionals or scientists, 7 or 13.0% were in education and 5 or 9.3% were in health care.

In 2000, there were 71 workers who commuted into the municipality and 329 workers who commuted away. The municipality is a net exporter of workers, with about 4.6 workers leaving the municipality for every one entering. A total of 106 workers (59.9% of the 177 total workers in the municipality) both lived and worked in Kaufdorf. Of the working population, 33.6% used public transportation to get to work, and 43.9% used a private car.

In 2011 the average local and cantonal tax rate on a married resident, with two children, of Kaufdorf making 150,000 CHF was 12.5%, while an unmarried resident's rate was 18.4%. For comparison, the average rate for the entire canton in the same year, was 14.2% and 22.0%, while the nationwide average was 12.3% and 21.1% respectively.

In 2009 there were a total of 402 tax payers in the municipality. Of that total, 181 made over 75,000 CHF per year. There was one person who made between 15,000 and 20,000 per year. The average income of the over 75,000 CHF group in Kaufdorf was 115,259 CHF, while the average across all of Switzerland was 130,478 CHF.

In 2011 a total of 1.4% of the population received direct financial assistance from the government.

== Religion ==
From the 2000 census, 575 or 72.8% belonged to the Swiss Reformed Church, while 79 or 10.0% were Roman Catholic. Of the rest of the population, there was 1 member of an Orthodox church, and there were 35 individuals (or about 4.43% of the population) who belonged to another Christian church. There were 20 (or about 2.53% of the population) who were Muslim. There was 1 person who was Buddhist. 69 (or about 8.73% of the population) belonged to no church, are agnostic or atheist, and 10 individuals (or about 1.27% of the population) did not answer the question.

== Education ==
In Kaufdorf about 60.9% of the population have completed non-mandatory upper secondary education, and 25.2% have completed additional higher education (either university or a Fachhochschule). Of the 123 who had completed some form of tertiary schooling listed in the census, 69.9% were Swiss men, 22.8% were Swiss women, 5.7% were non-Swiss men.

The Canton of Bern school system provides one year of non-obligatory Kindergarten, followed by six years of Primary school. This is followed by three years of obligatory lower Secondary school where the students are separated according to ability and aptitude. Following the lower Secondary students may attend additional schooling or they may enter an apprenticeship.

During the 2011-12 school year, there were a total of 108 students attending classes in Kaufdorf. There were 2 kindergarten classes with a total of 31 students in the municipality. Of the kindergarten students, 3.2% were permanent or temporary residents of Switzerland (not citizens) and 3.2% have a different mother language than the classroom language. The municipality had 4 primary classes and 77 students. Of the primary students, 5.2% were permanent or temporary residents of Switzerland (not citizens) and 6.5% have a different mother language than the classroom language.

As of 2000, there were a total of 87 students attending any school in the municipality. Of those, 72 both lived and attended school in the municipality, while 15 students came from another municipality. During the same year, 58 residents attended schools outside the municipality.
