= Willi Leuthold =

Swiss businessman (1897–1980)

- Born: 5 September 1897; Zurich, Switzerland
- Died: 24 August 1980 (aged 82); St. Gallen, Switzerland
- Occupation: Businessman
- Spouse: Delia Karrer
- Children: Juan M. Leuthold
- Parents: Hermann Leuthold (father); Sophie von Fels (mother)

Willi Leuthold (5 September 1897 – 24 August 1980) was a Swiss businessman. He was a director in the wholesale trade and Swiss honorary consul in Singapore. From 1944 he was a partner in the long-established retail and coffee business Rieser & Co. in St. Gallen, which he took over in 1953 and built up into a major food wholesale business under the name Leuthold & Co.

== Biography ==
Willi Leuthold was born on 5 September 1897 in Zurich, the son of Hermann Leuthold, a lithographer, and Sophie née von Fels. He married Delia Karrer.

Leuthold completed a commercial apprenticeship (kaufmännische Lehre) in St. Gallen. He worked as a director in the wholesale trade and was Swiss honorary consul in Singapore.

From 1944 Leuthold was an active partner in the long-established retail and coffee business Rieser & Co. in St. Gallen. In 1953 he took over the business and built it up under the name Leuthold & Co. into a major food wholesale business. In 1969 he handed it over to his son Juan. He died in St. Gallen on 24 August 1980.

== Bibliography ==
- Gallusstadt, 1981, 227–228
- 222 Jahre Lebensmittel Gross- und Detailhandel "hinterm Turm" in St.Gallen, 1983
