= Rüeggisberg =

- Municipality
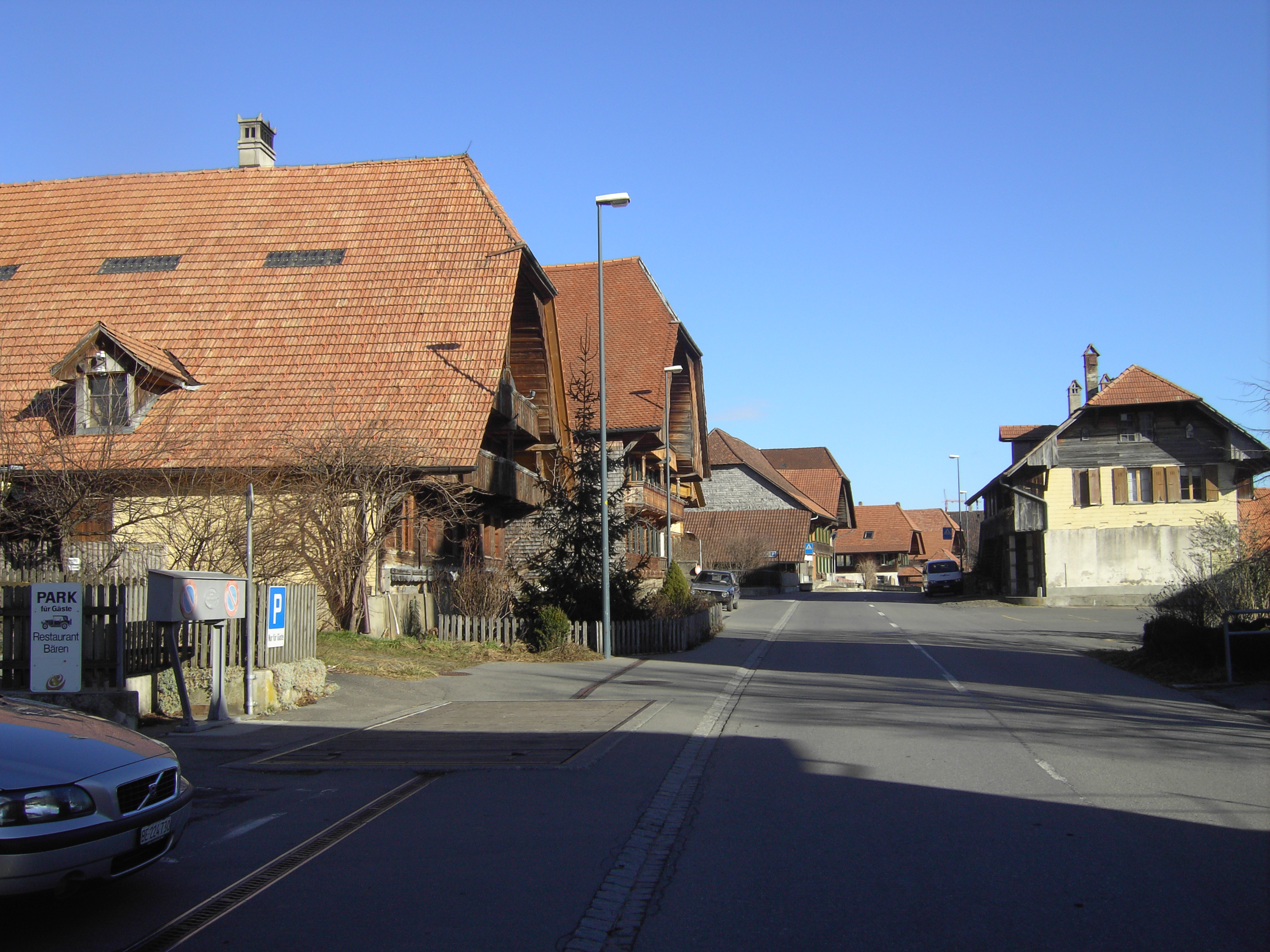

- Flag Coat of arms
- Location of Rüeggisberg
- Location within Switzerland Location within Canton of Bern
- Coordinates: 46°49′N 7°26′E
- Country: Switzerland
- Canton: Bern
- District: Bern-Mittelland

Government
  - Executive: Gemeinderat with 7 members
  - Mayor: Gemeindepräsident(in); Therese Ryser SVP/UDC (as of 2026)

Area
  - Total: 35.7 km^{2} (13.8 sq mi)
- Elevation: 930 m (3,050 ft)

Population (December 2020)
  - Total: 1,765
  - Density: 49.4/km^{2} (128/sq mi)
- Time zone: UTC+01:00 (CET)
  - Summer (DST): UTC+02:00 (CEST)
- Postal code: 3088
- SFOS number: 880
- ISO 3166 code: CH-BE
- Localities: Rüeggisberg (Mättiwil, Tromwil); Bütschel (Oberbütschel, Niederbütschel, Gschneit, Bungerten); Fultigen (Hinterfultigen, Vorderfultigen); Helgisried-Rohrbach (Helgisried, Rohrbach, Wiler, Schwanden, Brügglen, Schwand)
- Surrounded by: Blumenstein, Därstetten, Kaufdorf, Niedermuhlern, Oberbalm, Riggisberg, Rümligen, Rüschegg, Rüti bei Riggisberg, Toffen, Wahlern
- Website: www.rueggisberg.ch

Rüeggisberg is a municipality in the Bern-Mittelland administrative district in the canton of Bern in Switzerland.

== History ==
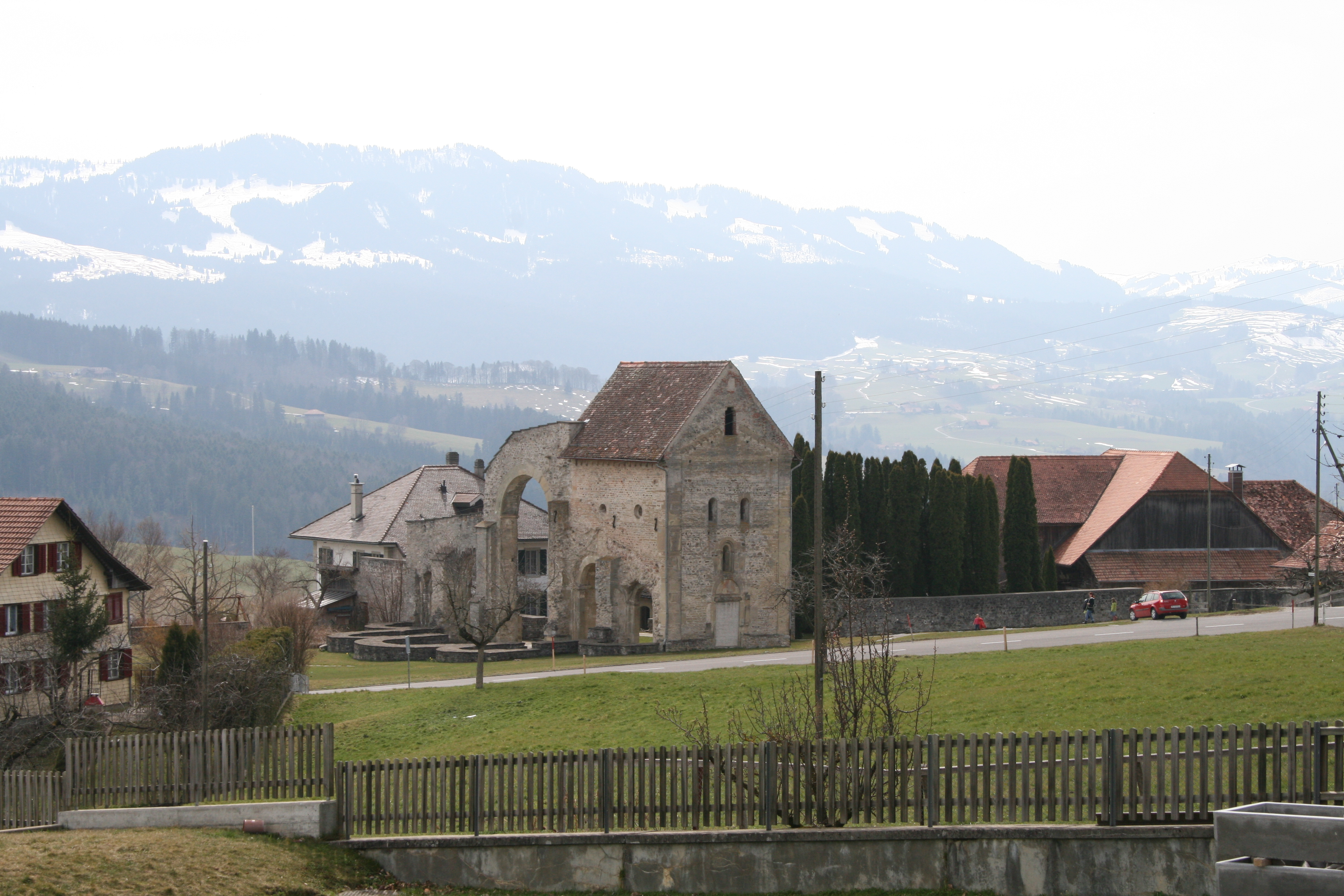
Ruins of Rüeggisberg Priory

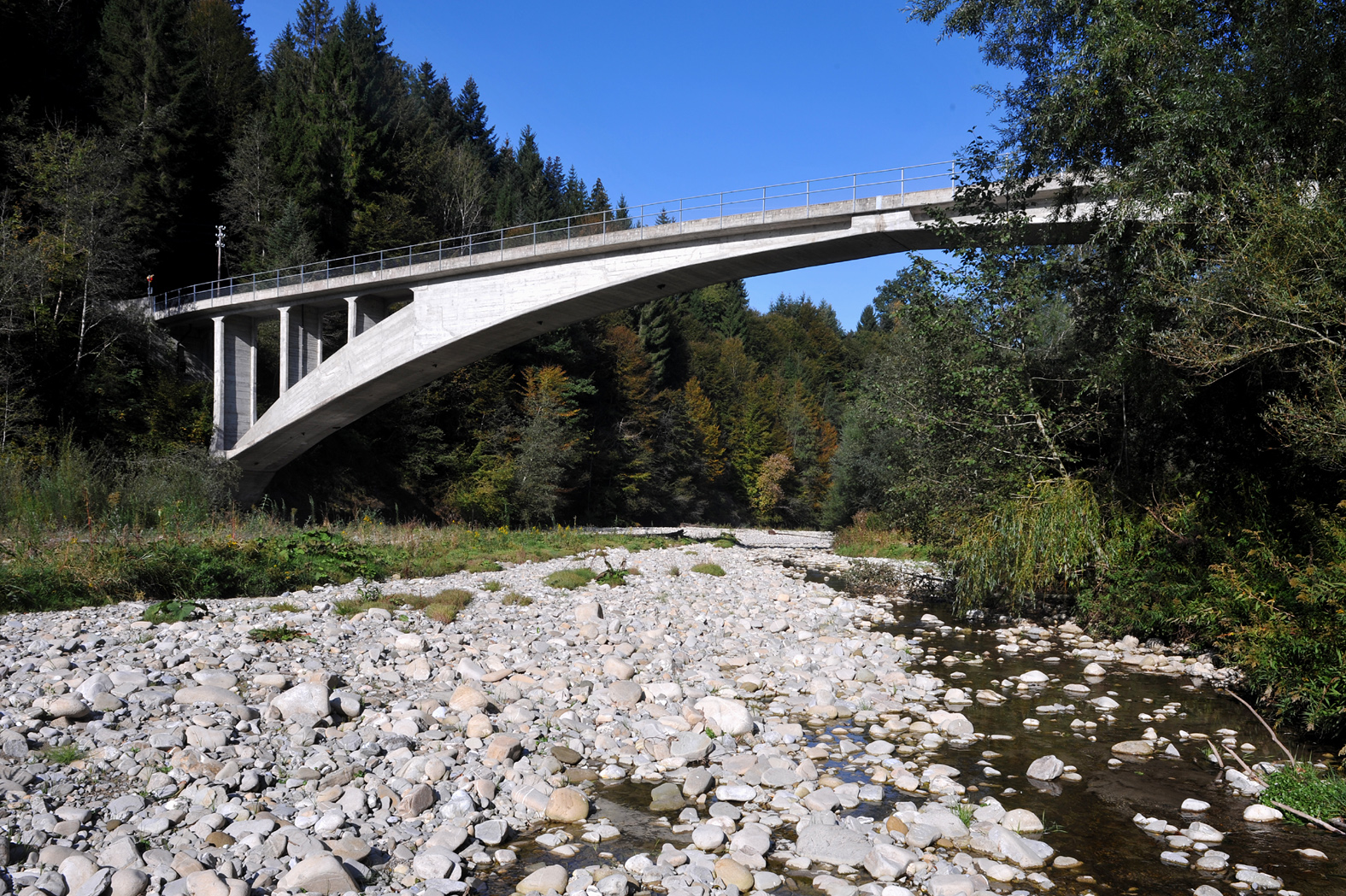
Rossgraben Bridge

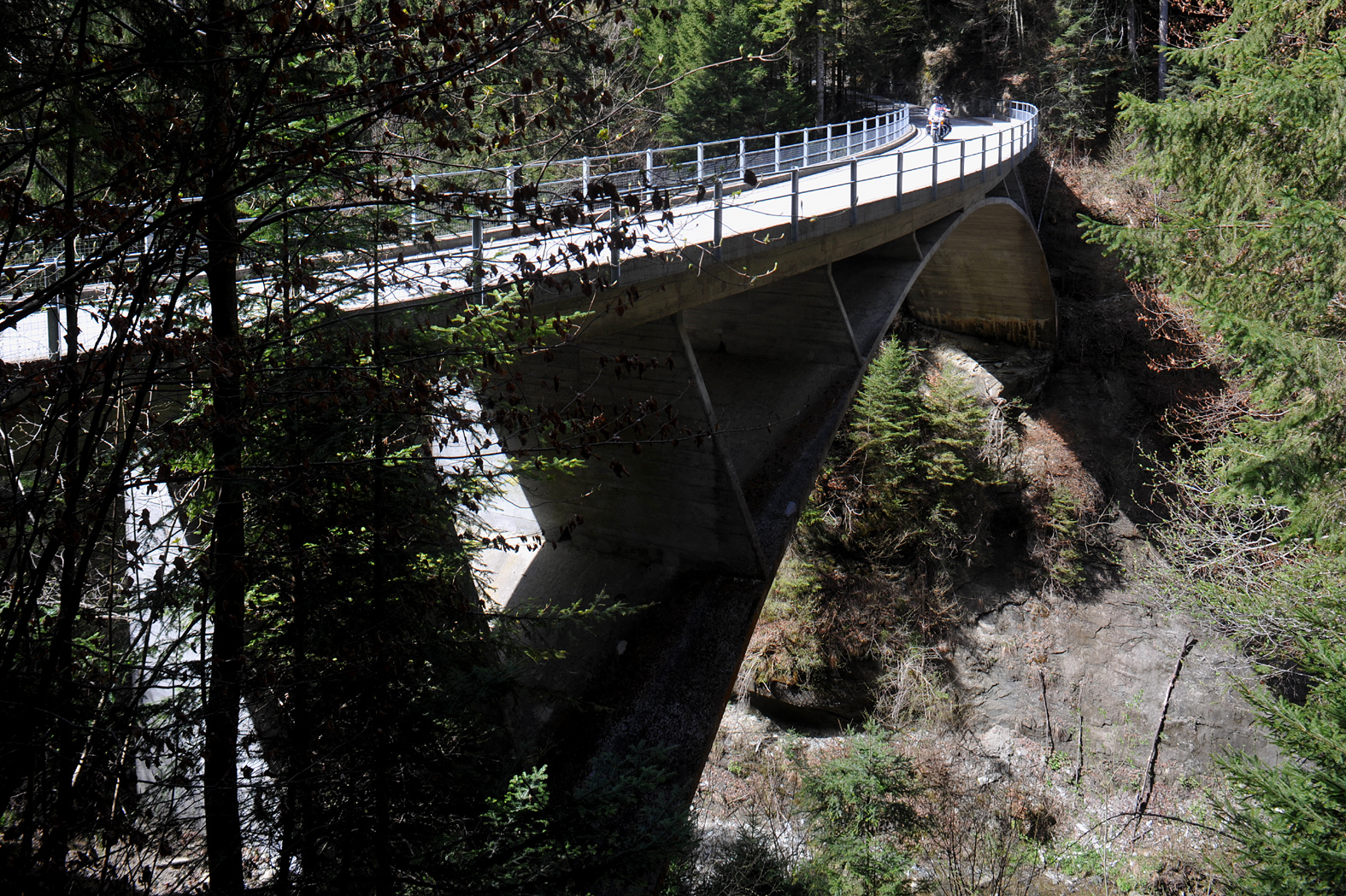
Schwandbach Bridge

Rüeggisberg is first mentioned in 1075 as mons Richeri. In 1224 it was mentioned as Ruogersperg.

The oldest trace of a settlement is the Roman road that likely passed through Rüeggisberg between Aventicum / Payerne and the Thun lake area. During the Middle Ages there were three fortifications in the area, Büffelhölzli, Ramsburg and Schlosschäle castles or forts. However no records remain of any of the three and only limited artifacts have been found. Rüeggisberg Priory was founded between 1072 and 1076 by Lütold of Rümligen. He granted the property and estates to Cluny Abbey making it the first Cluniac house in the German-speaking world. Under Cuno of Siegburg and Ulrich of Zell the first cells were built. Construction of the Romanesque church lasted from about 1100 to about 1185, of which there still remain the north transept and parts of the crossing tower. The Priory gradually lost power and in 1484 it was incorporated into the newly built college of the Augustinian Canons of Bern Minster. By 1532, when much of the town was destroyed in a fire, the Priory was abandoned. The church was shut down in 1541 during the Reformation and was partly demolished for building material.

The village church of St. Martin was built during the early Romanesque period. It was expanded several times, in the first half of the 12th century, then again after a fire in 1532 and several times during the 17th to 20th centuries.

For the early history of the village, the villagers were serfs to the Priory. However, as the Priory lost power the villagers gained rights and freedoms. In 1500 the village became fully independent from the Priory. Traditionally, the villagers raised crops in fields both on the valley floor and in the high alpine meadows. Beginning in the 19th century they gradually shifted to pasturing cattle for milk and cheese in the alpine meadows during the spring and summer. In 1803, with the reorganization of the Act of Mediation, the municipality was assigned to the Seftigen District. Between 1850 and 1980 the population of the municipality steadily dropped as residents emigrated out of Switzerland or moved to the cities of the Swiss Plateau for work. This trend began to reverse around 1975, when improved roads and a regular bus to Bern allowed residents to commute to jobs in the cities. Today just over half of the work force commutes for their jobs. Today just over half of the jobs in Rüeggisberg are in agriculture. There are five primary school buildings scattered around the municipality, but the Secondary school is in Riggisberg. The Rossgraben and Schwandbach bridges in the municipality were built in 1932 and 1933 by Robert Maillart and are now Swiss heritage site of national significance.

== Geography ==
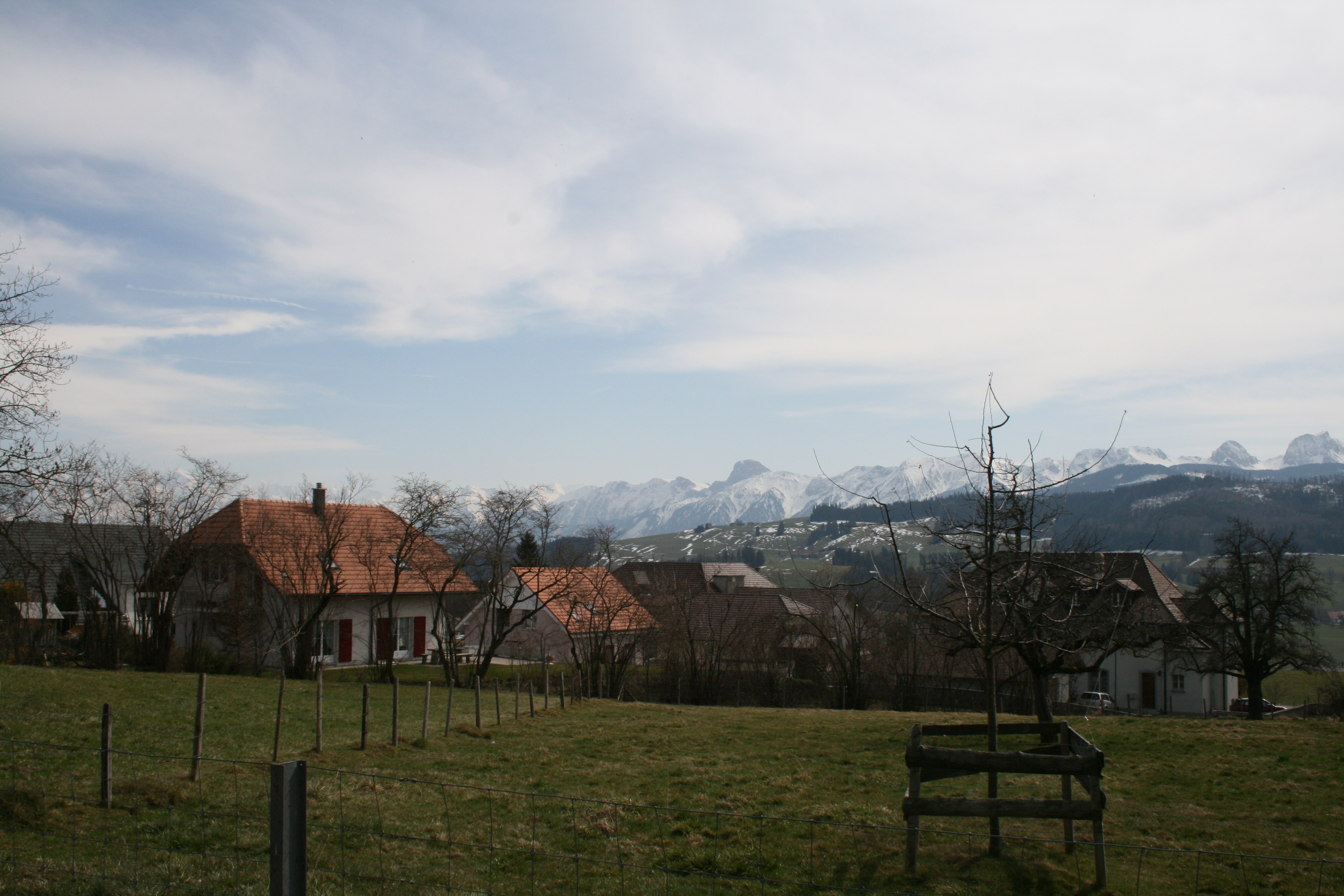
Rüeggisberg village with the Alps visible in the background

Rüeggisberg has an area of 35.81 km^{2} (13.83 sq mi). As of 2012, a total of 22.95 km^{2} (8.86 mi^{2}) or 64.2% is used for agricultural purposes, while 10.55 km^{2} (4.07 mi^{2}) or 29.5% is forested. The rest of the municipality is 1.55 km^{2} (0.60 mi^{2}) or 4.3% is settled (buildings or roads), 0.29 km^{2} (0.11 mi^{2}) or 0.8% is either rivers or lakes and 0.36 km^{2} (0.14 mi^{2}) or 1.0% is unproductive land.

During the same year, housing and buildings made up 2.2% and transportation infrastructure made up 2.0%. A total of 26.4% of the total land area is heavily forested and 3.1% is covered with orchards or small clusters of trees. Of the agricultural land, 13.1% is used for growing crops and 43.0% is pasturage, while 1.1% is used for orchards or vine crops and 6.9% is used for alpine pastures. All the water in the municipality is flowing water.

The municipality is located on a plateau along the southern flank of the Längenberg. It consists of the village of Rüeggisberg, the hamlets of Oberbütschel, Niederbütschel, Vorderfultigen, Hinterfultigen and Helgisried-Rohrbach, the exclave alpine meadows of an Gantrisch and Nünenenfluh as well as scattered farm houses.

On 31 December 2009 Amtsbezirk Seftigen, the municipality's former district, was dissolved. On the following day, 1 January 2010, it joined the newly created Verwaltungskreis Bern-Mittelland.

== Coat of arms ==
The blazon of the municipal coat of arms is Gules a Mullet Or between two Fir Trees Vert issuant from a Mount of 3 Coupeaux of the same.

== Demographics ==
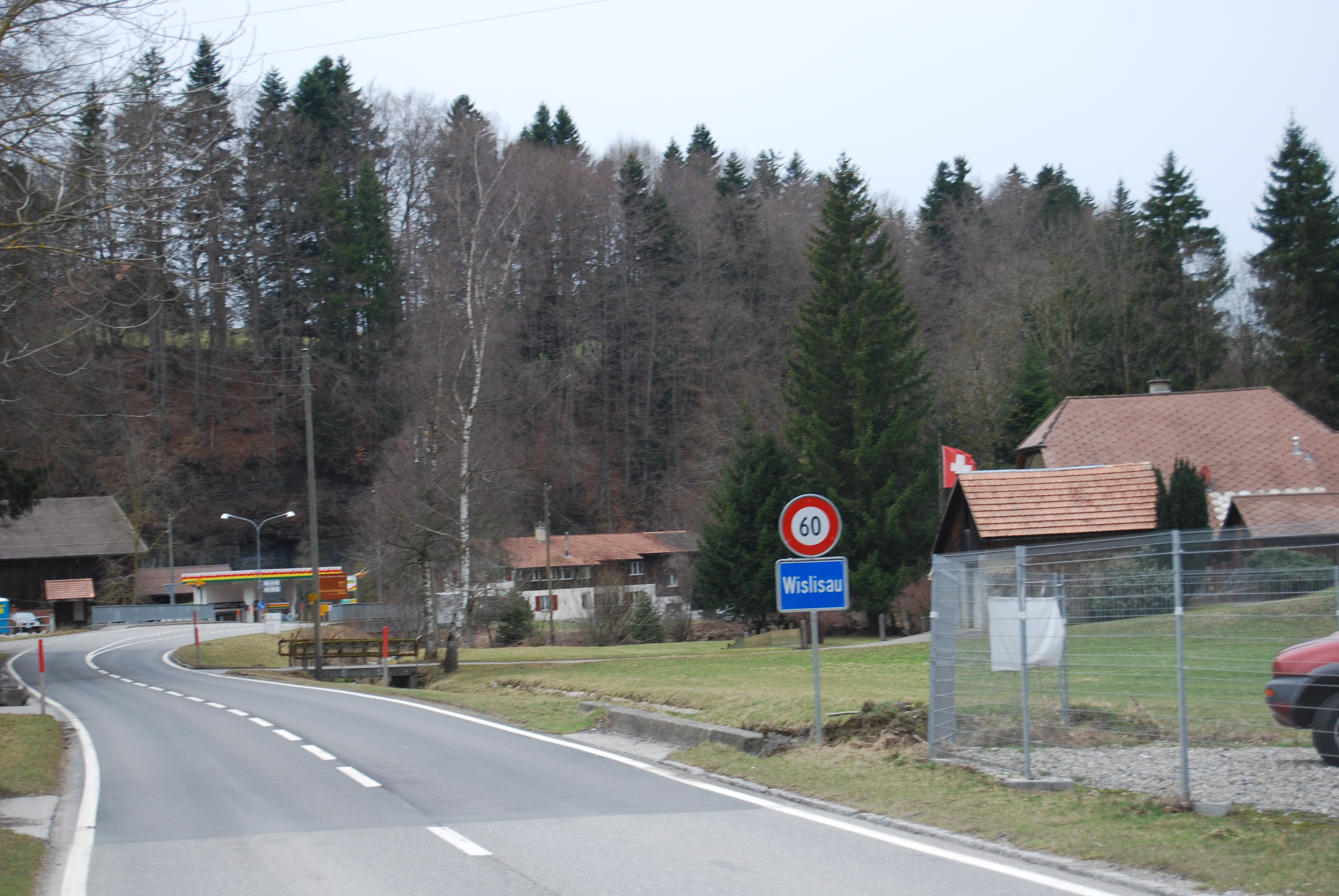
Wislisau hamlet in Rüeggisberg

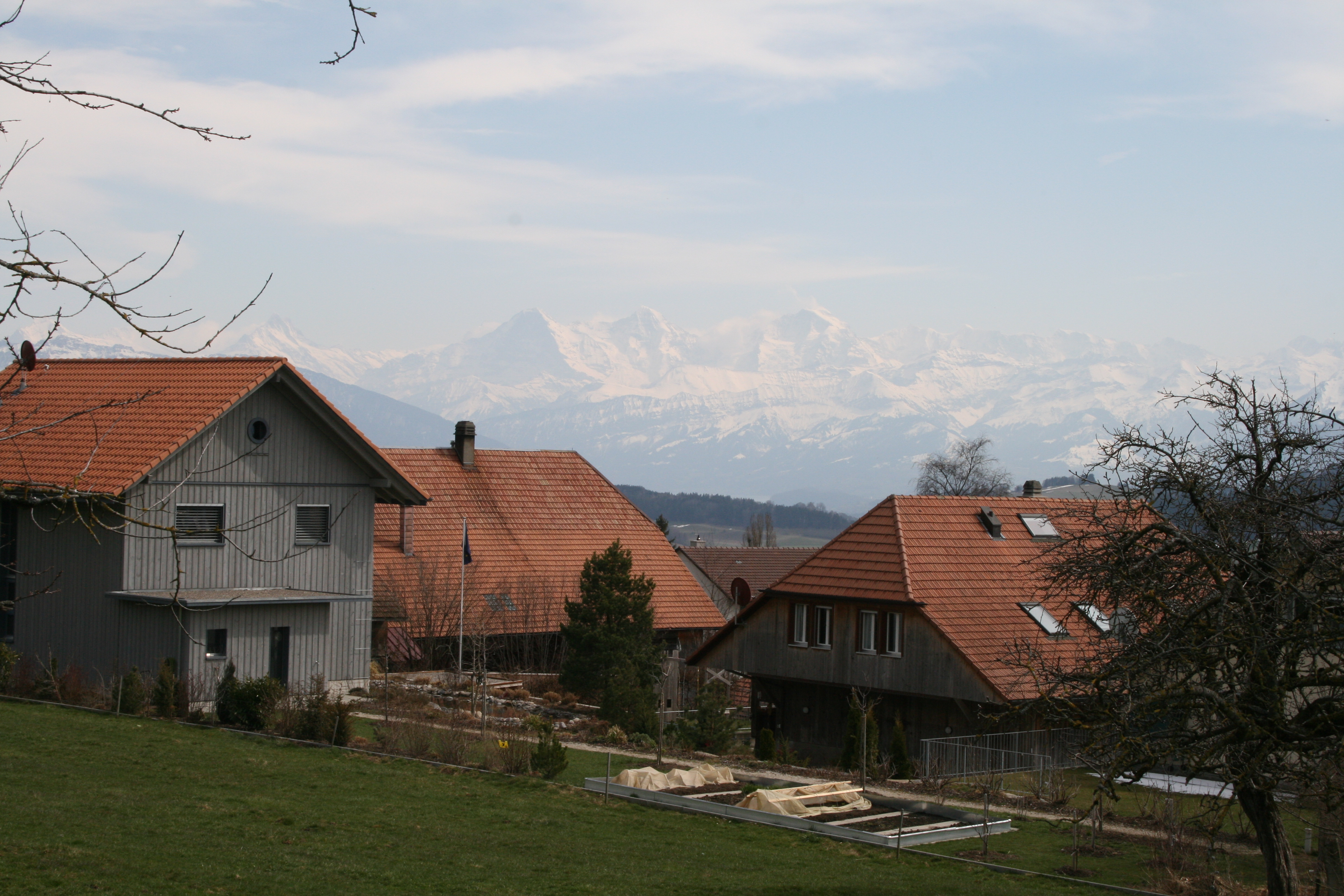
Houses in Rüeggisberg

Rüeggisberg has a population (as of December 2020) of 1,765. As of 2012, 2.6% of the population are resident foreign nationals. Over the last 2 years (2010–2012) the population has changed at a rate of -0.9%. Migration accounted for -0.7%, while births and deaths accounted for -0.1%.

Most of the population (as of 2000) speaks German (1,892 or 97.6%) as their first language, Albanian is the second most common (12 or 0.6%) and French is the third (8 or 0.4%). There is 1 person who speaks Italian and 1 person who speaks Romansh.

As of 2008, the population was 49.5% male and 50.5% female. The population was made up of 899 Swiss men (48.3% of the population) and 23 (1.2%) non-Swiss men. There were 913 Swiss women (49.0%) and 27 (1.5%) non-Swiss women. Of the population in the municipality, 908 or about 46.8% were born in Rüeggisberg and lived there in 2000. There were 709 or 36.6% who were born in the same canton, while 164 or 8.5% were born somewhere else in Switzerland, and 65 or 3.4% were born outside of Switzerland.

As of 2012, children and teenagers (0–19 years old) make up 20.6% of the population, while adults (20–64 years old) make up 60.1% and seniors (over 64 years old) make up 19.3%.

As of 2000, there were 823 people who were single and never married in the municipality. There were 947 married individuals, 109 widows or widowers and 60 individuals who are divorced.

As of 2010, there were 228 households that consist of only one person and 62 households with five or more people. In 2000, a total of 700 apartments (84.4% of the total) were permanently occupied, while 96 apartments (11.6%) were seasonally occupied and 33 apartments (4.0%) were empty. As of 2012, the construction rate of new housing units was 0.5 new units per 1000 residents. The vacancy rate for the municipality, in 2013, was 0.7%. In 2011, single family homes made up 35.0% of the total housing in the municipality.

The historical population is given in the following chart:

== Heritage sites of national significance ==
The Rossgrabenbrücke (a bridge shared with neighboring Wahlern), the ruins of the former Cluniac Rüeggisberg Priory Church and the Schwandbachbrücke (bridge) are listed as Swiss heritage site of national significance. The entire village of Rüeggisberg and the hamlets of Oberbütschel and Schwanden are part of the Inventory of Swiss Heritage Sites.

Rüeggisberg Priory was founded between 1072 and 1076 by Lütold of Rümligen. It was turned into the first Cluniac house in the German-speaking world by Cuno of Siegburg and Ulrich of Zell. Construction of the Romanesque church lasted from about 1100 to about 1185. Today only parts of the north transept and the crossing tower remain. The priory was one of the most important monastic houses of Switzerland during the Middle Ages, but in the late medieval period decline set in, and in 1484 it was incorporated into the newly built college of the Augustinian Canons of Bern Minster. The church was shut down in 1541 during the Reformation. The monastic buildings thereafter served as a source of building stone and partly as a barn.

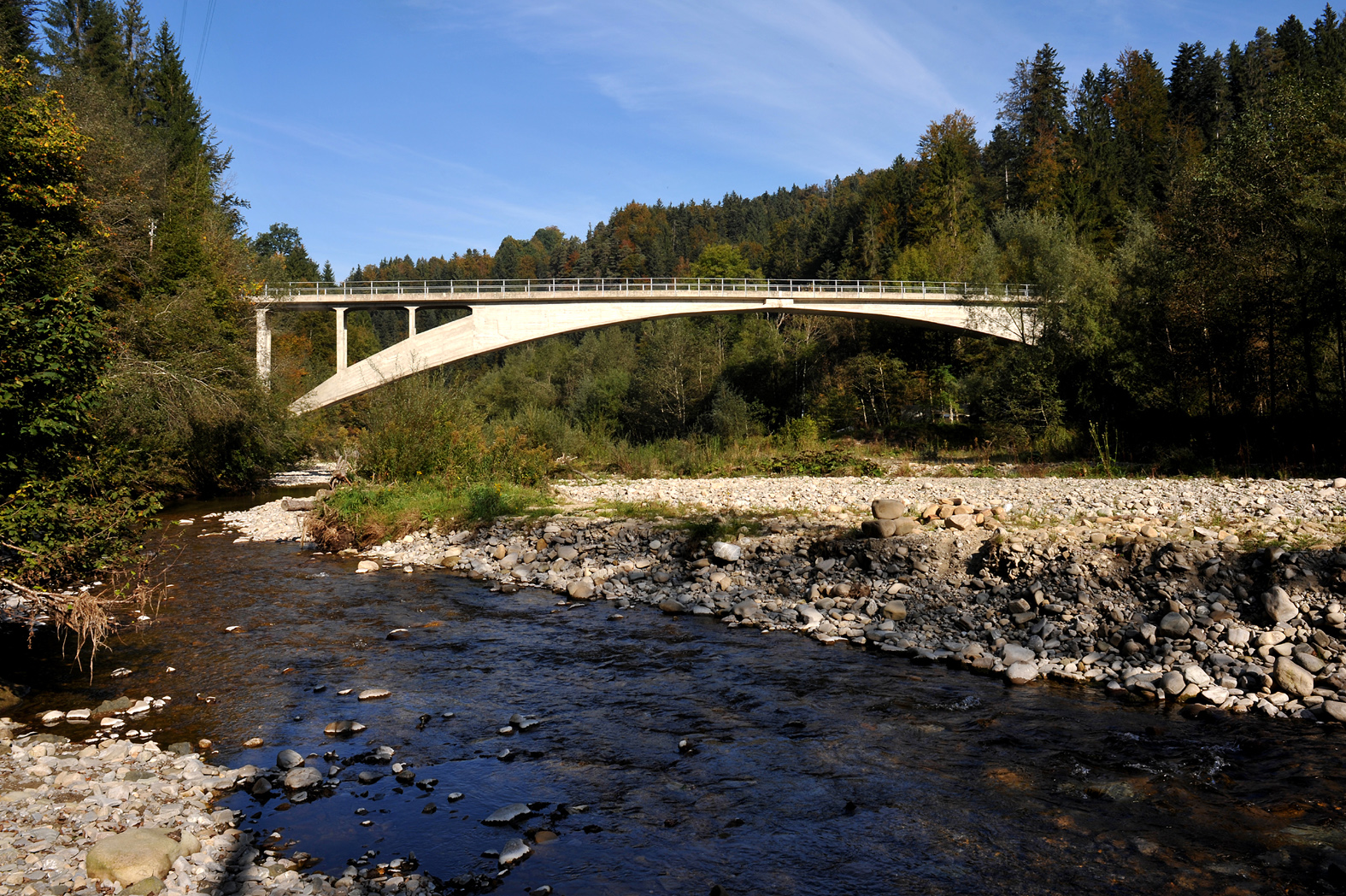
Rossgrabenbrücke

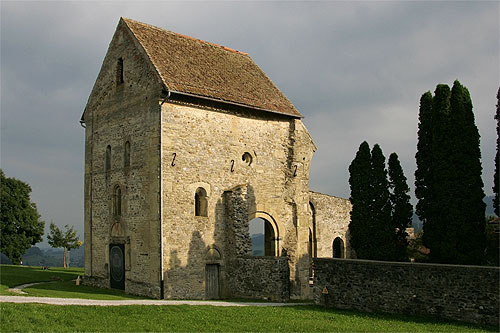
Ruins of the former Cluniac Rüeggisberg Priory Church

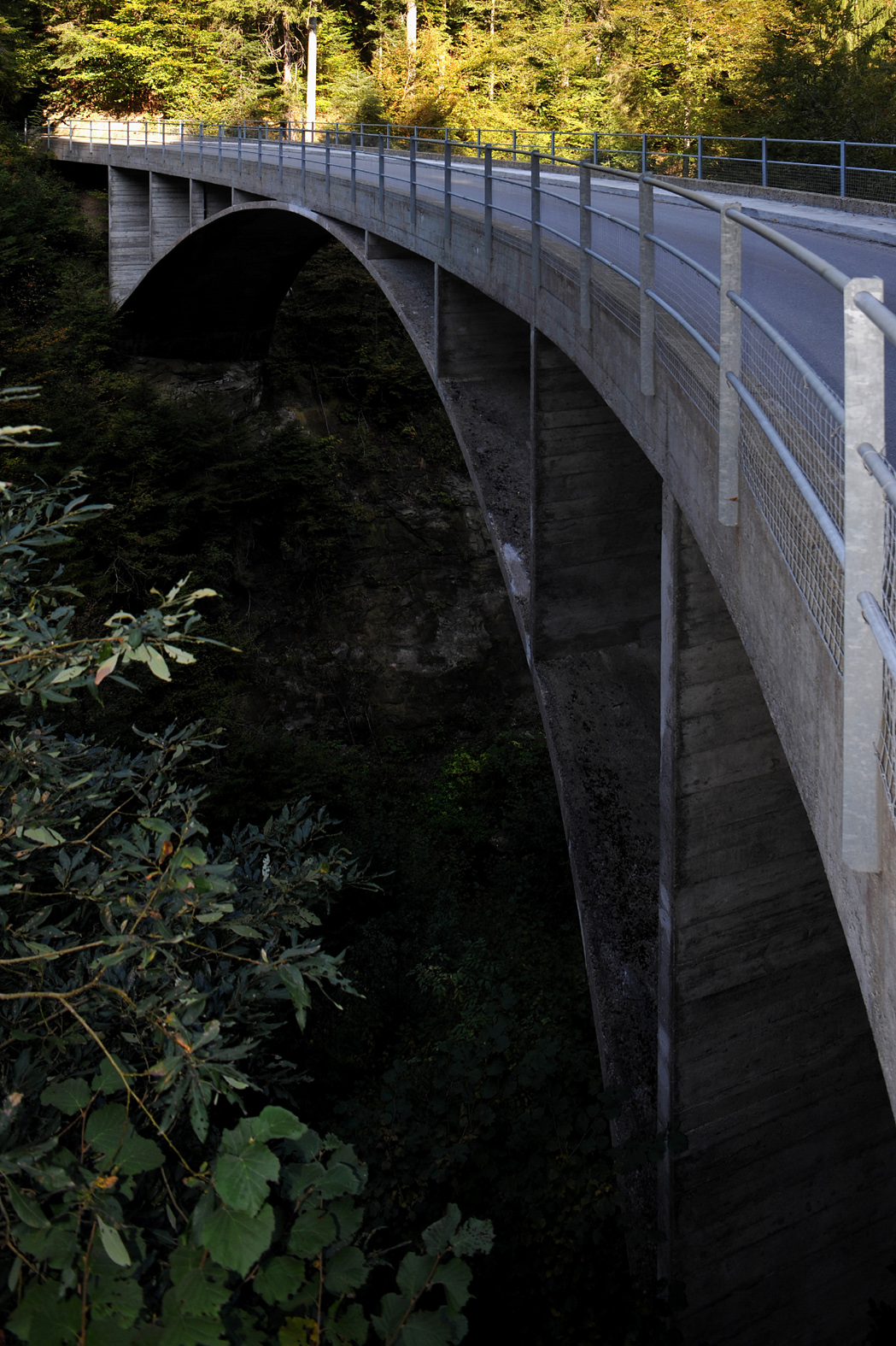
Schwandbachbrücke

== Politics ==
In the 2011 federal election the most popular party was the Swiss People's Party (SVP) which received 50.7% of the vote. The next three most popular parties were the Conservative Democratic Party (BDP) (17.5%), the Social Democratic Party (SP) (8.0%) and the Green Party (5.9%). In the federal election, a total of 781 votes were cast, and the voter turnout was 52.8%.

== Economy ==
As of 2011, Rüeggisberg had an unemployment rate of 1.12%. As of 2011, there were a total of 677 people employed in the municipality. Of these, there were 349 people employed in the primary economic sector and about 137 businesses involved in this sector. 99 people were employed in the secondary sector and there were 33 businesses in this sector. 229 people were employed in the tertiary sector, with 79 businesses in this sector. There were 1,012 residents of the municipality who were employed in some capacity, of which females made up 40.6% of the workforce.

In 2008 there were a total of 464 full-time equivalent jobs. The number of jobs in the primary sector was 239, all of which were in agriculture. The number of jobs in the secondary sector was 99 of which 40 or (40.4%) were in manufacturing and 59 (59.6%) were in construction. The number of jobs in the tertiary sector was 126. In the tertiary sector; 22 or 17.5% were in wholesale or retail sales or the repair of motor vehicles, 8 or 6.3% were in the movement and storage of goods, 14 or 11.1% were in a hotel or restaurant, 4 or 3.2% were in the information industry, 9 or 7.1% were the insurance or financial industry, 6 or 4.8% were technical professionals or scientists, 21 or 16.7% were in education and 22 or 17.5% were in health care.

In 2000, there were 100 workers who commuted into the municipality and 566 workers who commuted away. The municipality is a net exporter of workers, with about 5.7 workers leaving the municipality for every one entering. A total of 445 workers (81.7% of the 545 total workers in the municipality) both lived and worked in Rüeggisberg. Of the working population, 11.6% used public transportation to get to work, and 53.7% used a private car.

In 2011 the average local and cantonal tax rate on a married resident, with two children, of Rüeggisberg making 150,000 CHF was 13%, while an unmarried resident's rate was 19.1%. For comparison, the average rate for the entire canton in the same year, was 14.2% and 22.0%, while the nationwide average was 12.3% and 21.1% respectively.

In 2009 there were a total of 742 tax payers in the municipality. Of that total, 180 made over 75,000 CHF per year. There were 11 people who made between 15,000 and 20,000 per year. The greatest number of workers, 211, made between 50,000 and 75,000 CHF per year. The average income of the over 75,000 CHF group in Rüeggisberg was 106,415 CHF, while the average across all of Switzerland was 130,478 CHF.

In 2011 a total of 2.0% of the population received direct financial assistance from the government.

== Religion ==
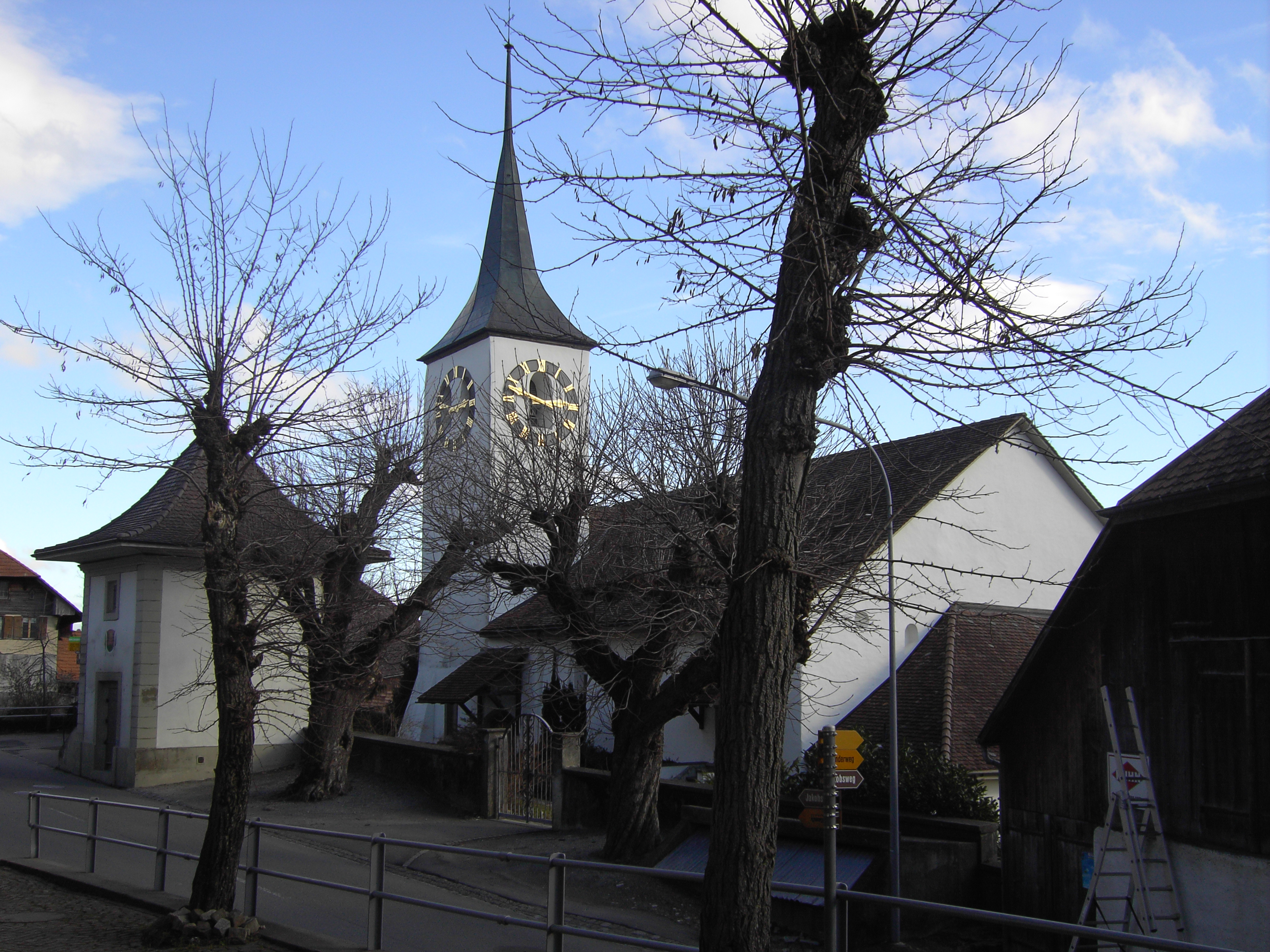
Village church

From the 2000 census, 1,562 or 80.6% belonged to the Swiss Reformed Church, while 58 or 3.0% were Roman Catholic. Of the rest of the population, there were 3 members of an Orthodox church (or about 0.15% of the population), there were 4 individuals (or about 0.21% of the population) who belonged to the Christian Catholic Church, and there were 83 individuals (or about 4.28% of the population) who belonged to another Christian church. There were 16 (or about 0.83% of the population) who were Muslim. There were 2 individuals who were Buddhist, 5 individuals who were Hindu and 1 individual who belonged to another church. 111 (or about 5.72% of the population) belonged to no church, are agnostic or atheist, and 94 individuals (or about 4.85% of the population) did not answer the question.

== Education ==
In Rüeggisberg about 53.6% of the population have completed non-mandatory upper secondary education, and 14% have completed additional higher education (either university or a Fachhochschule). Of the 156 who had completed some form of tertiary schooling listed in the census, 66.0% were Swiss men, 26.3% were Swiss women, 4.5% were non-Swiss men and 3.2% were non-Swiss women.

The Canton of Bern school system provides one year of non-obligatory Kindergarten, followed by six years of Primary school. This is followed by three years of obligatory lower Secondary school where the students are separated according to ability and aptitude. Following the lower Secondary students may attend additional schooling or they may enter an apprenticeship.

During the 2011–12 school year, there were a total of 154 students attending classes in Rüeggisberg. There were 2 kindergarten classes with a total of 26 students in the municipality. Of the kindergarten students, 3.8% have a different mother language than the classroom language. The municipality had 6 primary classes and 102 students. Of the primary students, 2.9% were permanent or temporary residents of Switzerland (not citizens) and 4.9% have a different mother language than the classroom language. During the same year, there were 2 lower secondary classes with a total of 26 students.

As of 2000, there were a total of 239 students attending any school in the municipality. Of those, 213 both lived and attended school in the municipality, while 26 students came from another municipality. During the same year, 80 residents attended schools outside the municipality.
