= Juerg Leuthold =

Swiss physicist

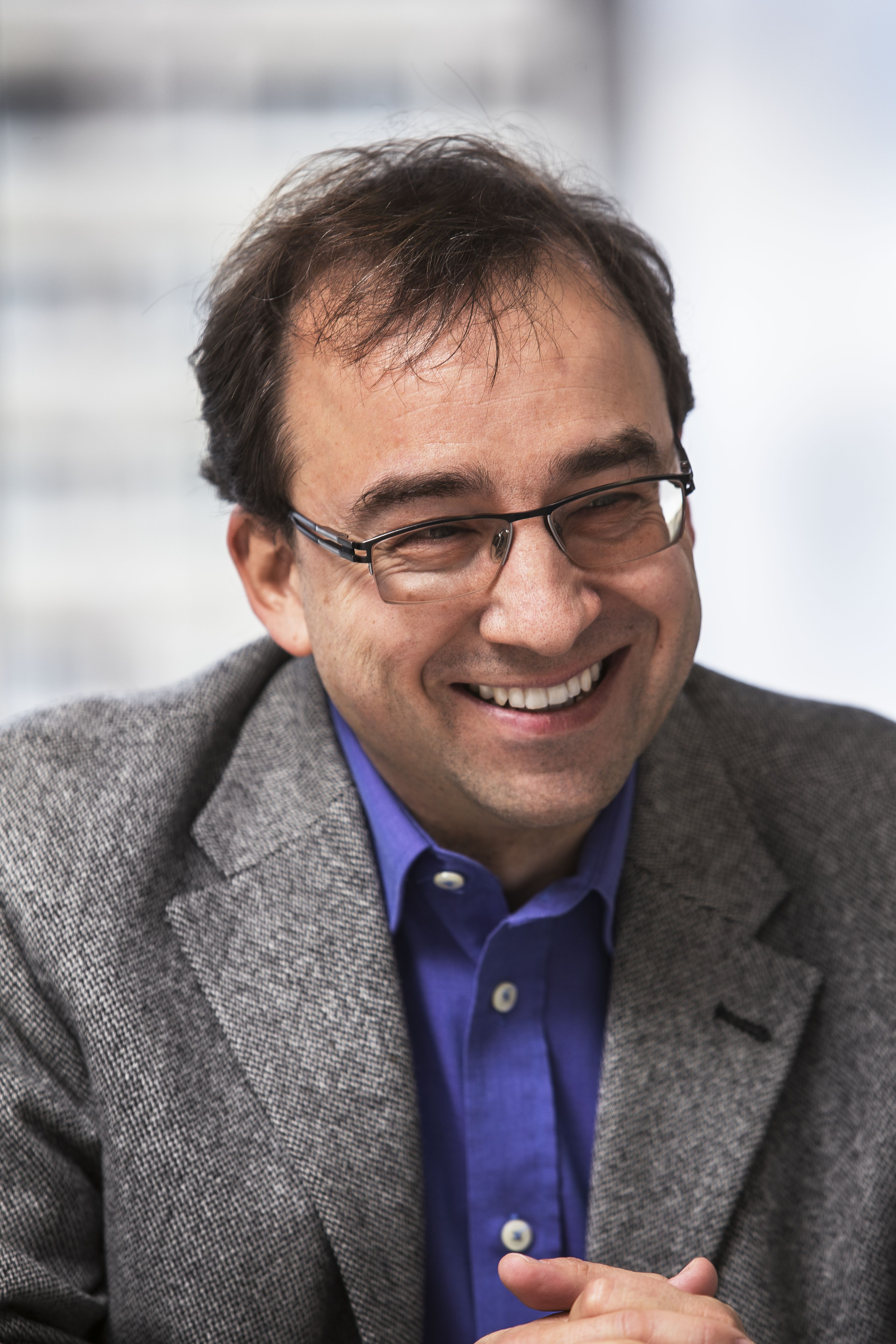
- Juerg Leuthold (2014)
- Born: Juerg Leuthold; July 11, 1966 (age 59); Zurich, Switzerland
- Occupation: physicist

Juerg Leuthold is a full professor at ETH Zurich, Switzerland.

== Biography ==
Leuthold was born in 1966 in Switzerland. He received a Ph.D. degree in physics from ETH Zurich for work in the field of integrated optics and all-optical communications.

From 1999 to 2004 Leuthold was affiliated with Bell Labs, Lucent Technologies in Holmdel, USA, where he performed device and system research with III/V semiconductor and silicon optical bench materials for applications in high-speed telecommunications.

From 2004 to 2013 Leuthold was a full professor at Karlsruhe Institute of Technology, where he headed the Institute of Photonics and Quantum Electronics and the Helmholtz Institute of Microtechnology. Since March 2013 he has been a full professor at ETH Zurich, where he heads the Institute of Electromagnetic Fields.

== Affiliations ==
Leuthold is a fellow of the Optical Society of America and of the Institute of Electrical and Electronics Engineers. When he was a professor at Karlsruhe, he was a member of the Helmholtz Association Think Tank and a member of the Heidelberg Academy of Science. He served on the board of directors of the Optical Society of America. Leuthold has been and is serving the community as general chair and in many technical program committees.

== Research Interests ==
Leuthold interests are in the fields of photonics, terahertz and communications. His current activities are centered around"

- High-speed optical communications and sensing
- Microwave photonics and terahertz technologies
- Plasmonics
- Integrated optics
- Atomic Scale Technologies (Memristive device research)

=== Research ===
- Direct conversion of an RF signal to an optical signal by means of plasmonic-antenna
- Plasmonic detection with 100 GHz and beyond bandwidth and high responsivity
- The demonstration of the smallest and most compact plasmonic modulators
- Demonstration of single atom plasmonic switches (i.e. switches, where relocating a single atom performs optical switching operation in the order o 10 dB)
- Record Encoding of 26 Tbit/s of OFDM data onto a single laser and Nyquist encoding of 30 Tbit/s of data onto a single laser
- Record nonlinear conversion in a short silicon slot waveguide
- First 100 Gbit/s single carrier wireless transmission demonstration
- Development of DPSK Transmission system
- Record all-optical signal processing: Most compact and fast 100 Gbit/s all-optical wavelength converter, and demonstration of 1'000'000 km transmission
- Theory and demonstration of "most perfect" semiconductor-optical amplifier (SOA) based all-optical signal wavelength conversion scheme
- Contributions to the development of Multimode-Interference (MMI) Couplers: Introduction of higher-order mode converters, spatial mode filters realized by MMIs, or MMI couplers with tunable splitting ratios

== Awards and honors ==
- 2018 Doron Prize
- 2015 ERC Advanced Research Grant
- 2013 Elevated to the rank of a Fellow of the Institute of Electrical and Electronics Engineers for contributions to high-speed optical communications
- 2011 Hector Fellow Research Price
- 2010 Member of the Heidelberg Academy of Sciences
- 2009 Landesforschungspreis Baden-Württemberg for achievements in silicon nanotechnology. This is the highest funded research prize of a German state and entitles to an extra research fund worth €100,000.
- 2009 Elevation to the rank of Fellow of the Optical Society (OSA)
- 2007 Election to "Top five Innovators in the field of Optics in Germany of the year 2007" by the German VDI
- 2002 Central Bell Labs Teamwork Awards" for the development of the "RZ-DPSK System"
- 1999 Award of the "1999 Lucent President's Award for Team Excellence" (In recognition of the first fully integrated 100 Gbit/s InP optic chip for data encryption)
