= Juan M. Leuthold =

Swiss businessman (1932–2026)

- Born: 1 May 1932; Singapore
- Died: 16 April 2026 (aged 93)
- Occupation: Businessman
- Spouse: Elisabeth Krähenbühl
- Children: Stefan Leuthold
- Father: Willi Leuthold

Juan M. Leuthold (1 May 1932 – 16 April 2026) was a Swiss businessman. He joined his father's business in 1957 and took it over in 1969. Cash-and-carry wholesale markets were founded in 1967, a distribution center and the Maxi markets in 1970, and in 1989 the Swiss license for Spar supermarkets was acquired. In 2000 Leuthold restructured the family business into Spar Holding and Leuthold & Co. AG Holding.

== Biography ==
Leuthold was born on 1 May 1932 in Singapore, the son of Willi Leuthold. He married Elisabeth Krähenbühl.

Leuthold attended the cantonal school (Kantonsschule) in St. Gallen. After periods abroad, he joined his father's business in 1957, the food wholesale business Leuthold & Co. in St. Gallen, and took it over in 1969.

In 1967 the first cash-and-carry wholesale markets for the catering trade, retailers and small businesses were founded (BMG Top CC AG, St. Gallen), and in 1970 the distribution center Ovag AG in Zuzwil, which was complemented in 1987 by the purchase of Bernag AG in Gossau. To expand the retail business, the Maxi markets, with departments for fresh produce, were founded in 1970, and in 1989 the Swiss license for Spar supermarkets was acquired. In 2000 the turnover amounted to 712 million francs.

In 2000 Leuthold restructured the family business, creating Spar Holding, with Spar Handels AG and Top CC AG, and Leuthold & Co. AG Holding. He became chairman of the board of directors of Leuthold & Co. AG Holding and handed the chairmanship of Spar Holding to his son Stefan. He died on 16 April 2026.

== Bibliography ==
- SPAR Gruppe, 1999
