= Rüeggisberg Priory =

- Kloster Rüeggisberg
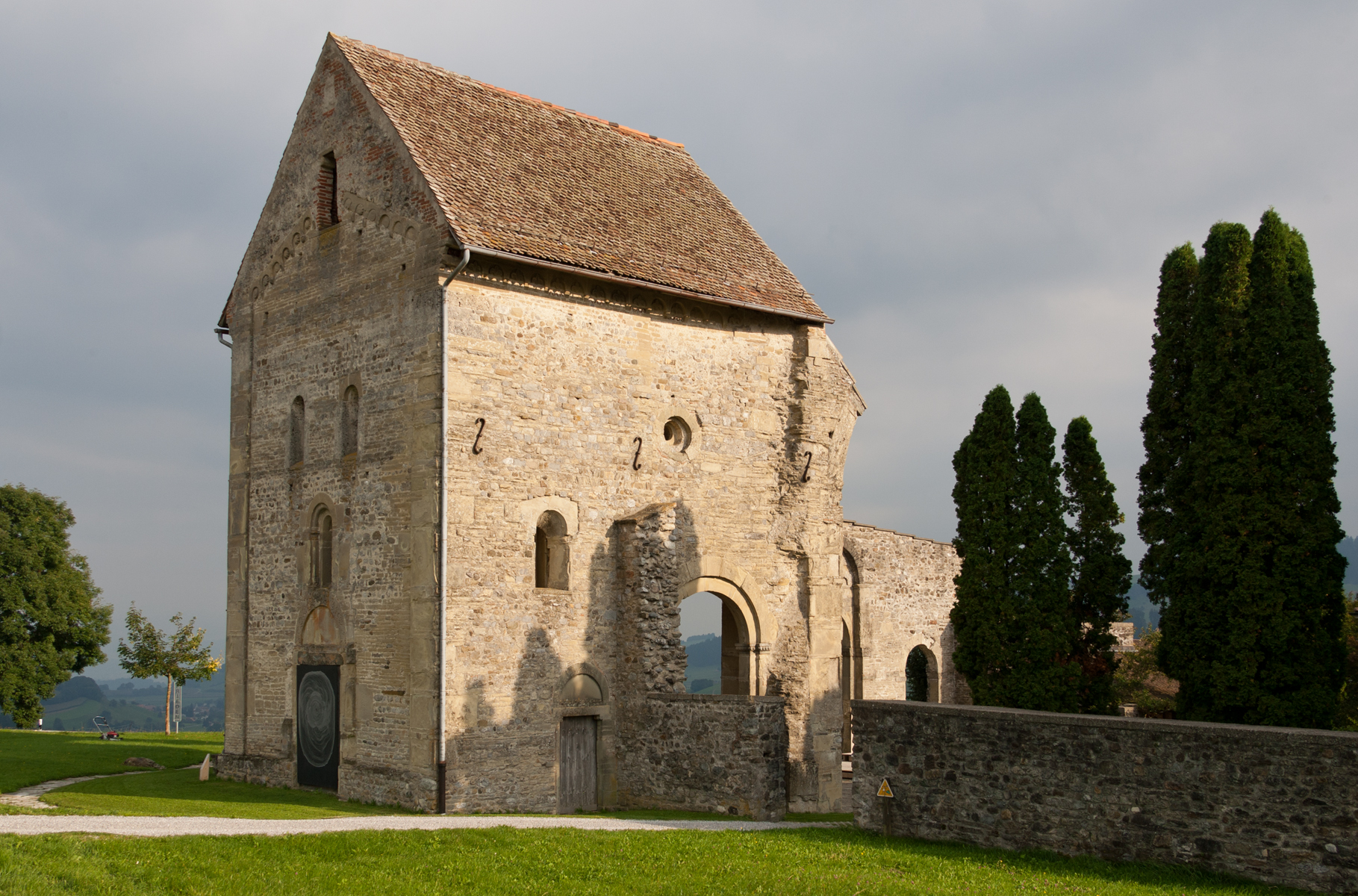
- Ruins of Rüeggisberg Priory Church

- Location within Switzerland
- Interactive map of Rüeggisberg Priory

Monastery information
- Order: Cluniac
- Established: 1072-1076
- Disestablished: 1532
- Mother house: Cluny Abbey
- Controlled churches: Priory Church of Sts. Peter and Paul

People
- Founder: Lütold of Rümligen

Architecture
- Functional status: ruined
- Heritage designation: Swiss Inventory of Cultural Property of National and Regional Significance
- Style: Romanesque

Site
- Location: Rüeggisberg, Bern, Switzerland
- Coordinates: 46.819363°N 7.437039°E
- Visible remains: North transept and the crossing tower
- Public access: yes

Rüeggisberg Priory (Kloster Rüeggisberg) was a Cluniac priory in the municipality of Rüeggisberg, Canton of Bern, Switzerland.

== History ==
The Priory was founded between 1072 and 1076 by Lütold of Rümligen. He granted the property and estates to Cluny Abbey, making it the first Cluniac house in the German-speaking world. Under Cuno of Siegburg and Ulrich of Zell the first cells were built. Construction of the Romanesque church lasted from about 1100 to about 1185. There still remain the church's north transept and parts of the crossing tower. The Priory was dependent on Cluny Abbey and normally had a prior and two to four monks from Cluny. In 1148, there were two priories that were dependent on Rüeggisberg, in Röthenbach im Emmental and Alterswil.

At its peak the priory controlled estates throughout what is now the Canton of Bern, including Guggisberg, Alterswil, Plaffeien and Schwarzenburg, as well as scattered farm houses and vineyards on the shores of Lake Biel.

The priory was one of the most important monastic houses of Switzerland during the Middle Ages, but in the late medieval period decline set in, and in 1484 it was incorporated into the newly-built college of the Augustinian Canons of Bern Minster. By 1532, when much of the town was destroyed in a fire, the Priory was abandoned. The church was shut down in 1541 during the Reformation. The monastic buildings thereafter served as a source of building stone, and partly as a barn.

Between 1938 and 1947 the old foundations were again laid bare in an archaeological dig, as may be seen in the little museum next to the rectory.

== Current condition ==
The ruins are generally open to the public, although they may be reserved for picnics or other gatherings. Each November an Advent market is held in the ruins, and over the years a variety of open air plays and concerts have been held here. Between Easter and September, church services are held monthly at the ruins.
