= Wald, Bern =

Wald
- Municipality
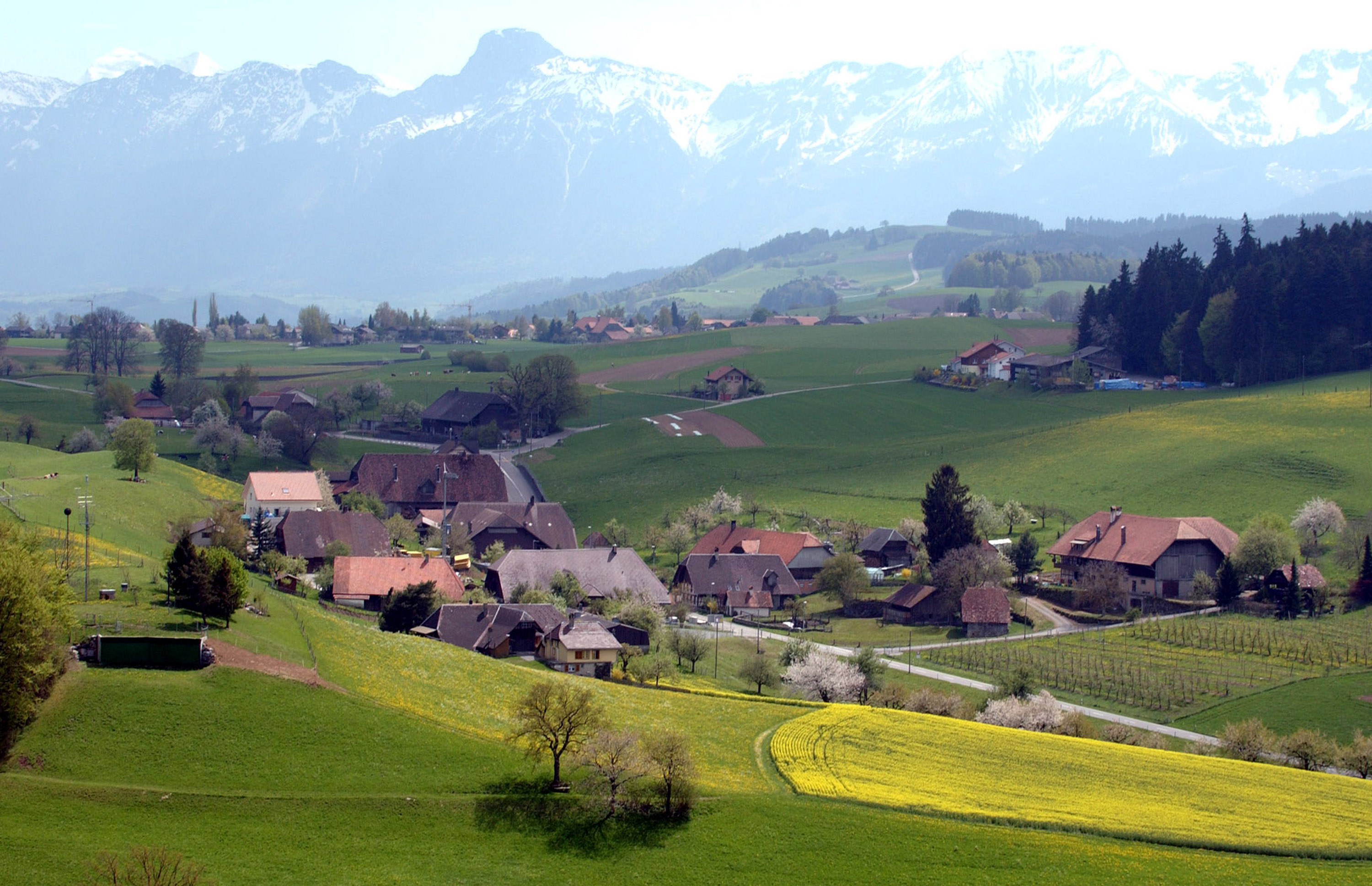

- Flag Coat of arms
- Location of Wald
- Location within Switzerland Location within Canton of Bern
- Coordinates: 46°53′N 7°28′E
- Country: Switzerland
- Canton: Bern
- District: Bern-Mittelland

Government
  - Executive: Gemeinderat with 5 members
  - Mayor: Gemeindepräsident(in); Christian Neuenschwander (as of 2026)

Area
  - Total: 13.3 km^{2} (5.1 sq mi)
- Elevation (Zimmerwald): 840 m (2,760 ft)

Population (December 2020)
  - Total: 1,160
  - Density: 87.2/km^{2} (226/sq mi)
- Time zone: UTC+01:00 (CET)
  - Summer (DST): UTC+02:00 (CEST)
- Postal code: 3086
- SFOS number: 888
- ISO 3166 code: CH-BE
- Localities: Englisberg (with Kühlewil and Unterer Wald), Zimmerwald (with Willishalten, "Bei der Kirche", Niederhäusern, Winzenried, Oberer Wald, Waldhof, Obermuhlern, Egg, Oberbrönni, Niederbrönni, Bumishus)
- Surrounded by: Belp, Kehrsatz, Köniz, Niedermuhlern, Oberbalm, Toffen
- Website: https://www.wald-be.ch/

Wald (Swiss Standard German pronunciation: [vald]) is a municipality in the Bern-Mittelland administrative district in the canton of Bern in Switzerland.

== History ==
In January 2004 it incorporated the two independent municipalities of Zimmerwald and Englisberg.

- Englisberg, population: 201
- Zimmerwald, population: 870

Englisberg is first mentioned in 1166 as Endlisperc.

Zimmerwald was first mentioned in 1296 as Zymmerwalt. Until 1902 it was officially known as Obermuhlern und Zimmerwald.

=== Englisberg ===
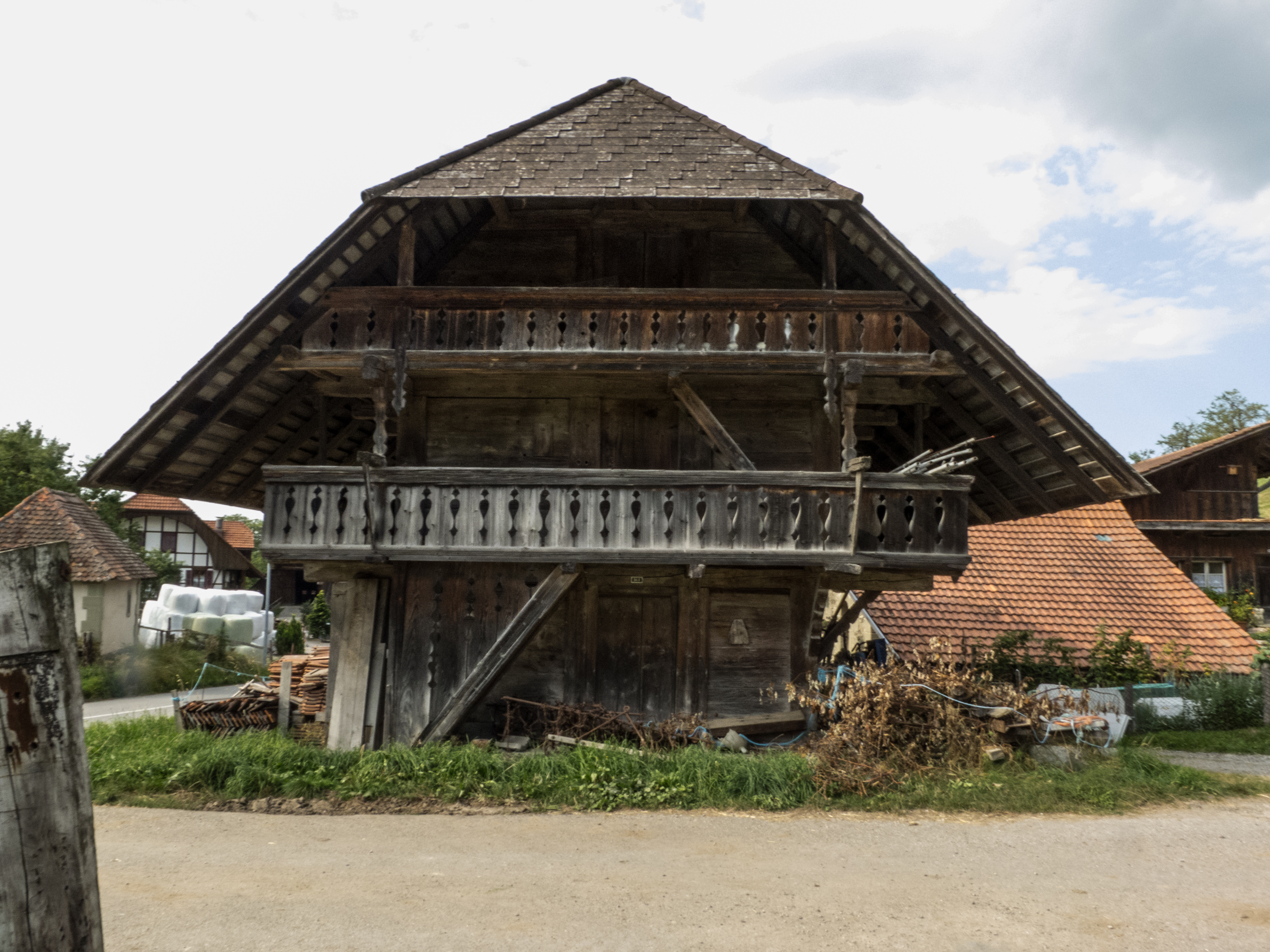
Granary in Englisberg

Englisberg first appears in a historic record with the Kyburg Ministerialis (unfree knights in the service of a feudal overlord) family of Englisberg. By the 15th century Bernese patrician families owned the village and surrounding Herrschaft. The right to hold court in the Herrschaft was sold to the villagers in 1570 and then split into 70 shares. This situation remained until the 18th century, when Bernese patricians bought the majority of the shares back. It was originally part of the parish of Belp, but in 1699 became an independent parish.

The village economy always relied on agriculture. However, by 1900 fewer workers were needed on the farms and the population began to decline. A poorhouse opened in 1890 and eventually became the Kühlewil nursing home, which is now a major employer in the village.

=== Zimmerwald ===
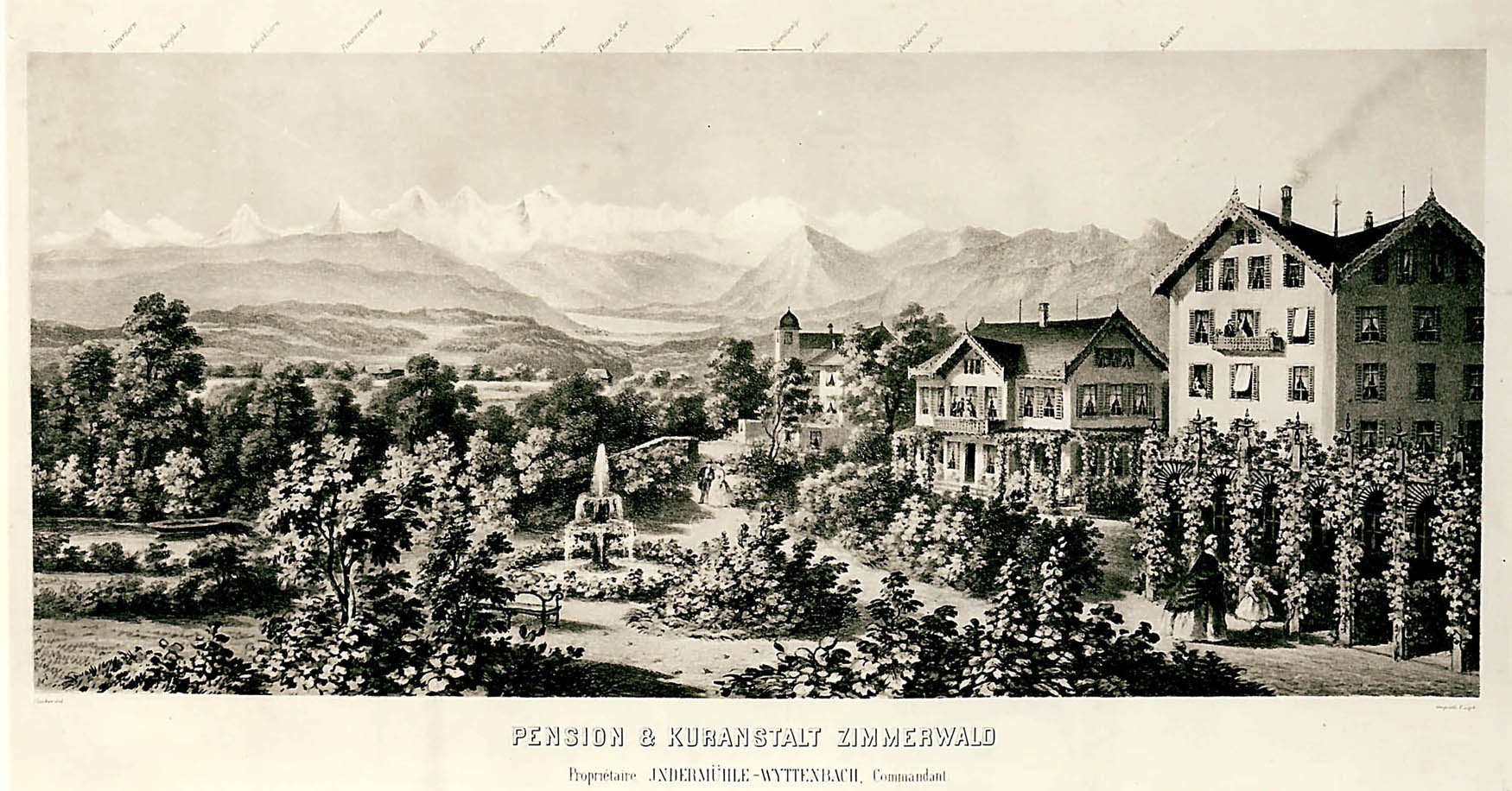
Hotel und Pension de Beau Séjour, Zimmerwald, dated 1865

The oldest trace of a settlement in the area are several neolithic artifacts found at Äppenacker. Roman era artifacts and a lime kiln have been discovered scattered around the municipal area. The village and surrounding lands were owned by several Bernese families as well as Interlaken Monastery, Köniz and Münchenbuchsee Commanderys and the Obere Spital in Bern. In 1528 Bern adopted the new faith of the Protestant Reformation, secularized the monasteries and acquired their estates, including Zimmerwald. The village was combined to form the court of Obermuhlern and Zimmerwald in the Seftigen District. Until 1697 it was part of the large parish of Belp, then it formed an independent parish with the parish church in Zimmerwald.

In 1641 the wealthy Bernese Werdt family built a hunting lodge in the village. In 1860 the Pension Beau Séjour was built in the park near the lodge. The Pension became famous, when in 1915, the Zimmerwald Conference was held there. The Zimmerwald Conference was the first of three international socialist conferences convened by anti-militarist socialist parties from countries that were originally neutral during World War I. The Zimmerwald movement grew out of the conferences. The delegates included Lenin and Leon Trotsky. Eventually the Pension was demolished and no trace remains of the building.

In 1956 the University of Bern opened the Zimmerwald Observatory in the municipality. In 1988 a satellite monitoring station was added. Today, the village economy still relies mostly on farming and raising livestock.

== Geography ==
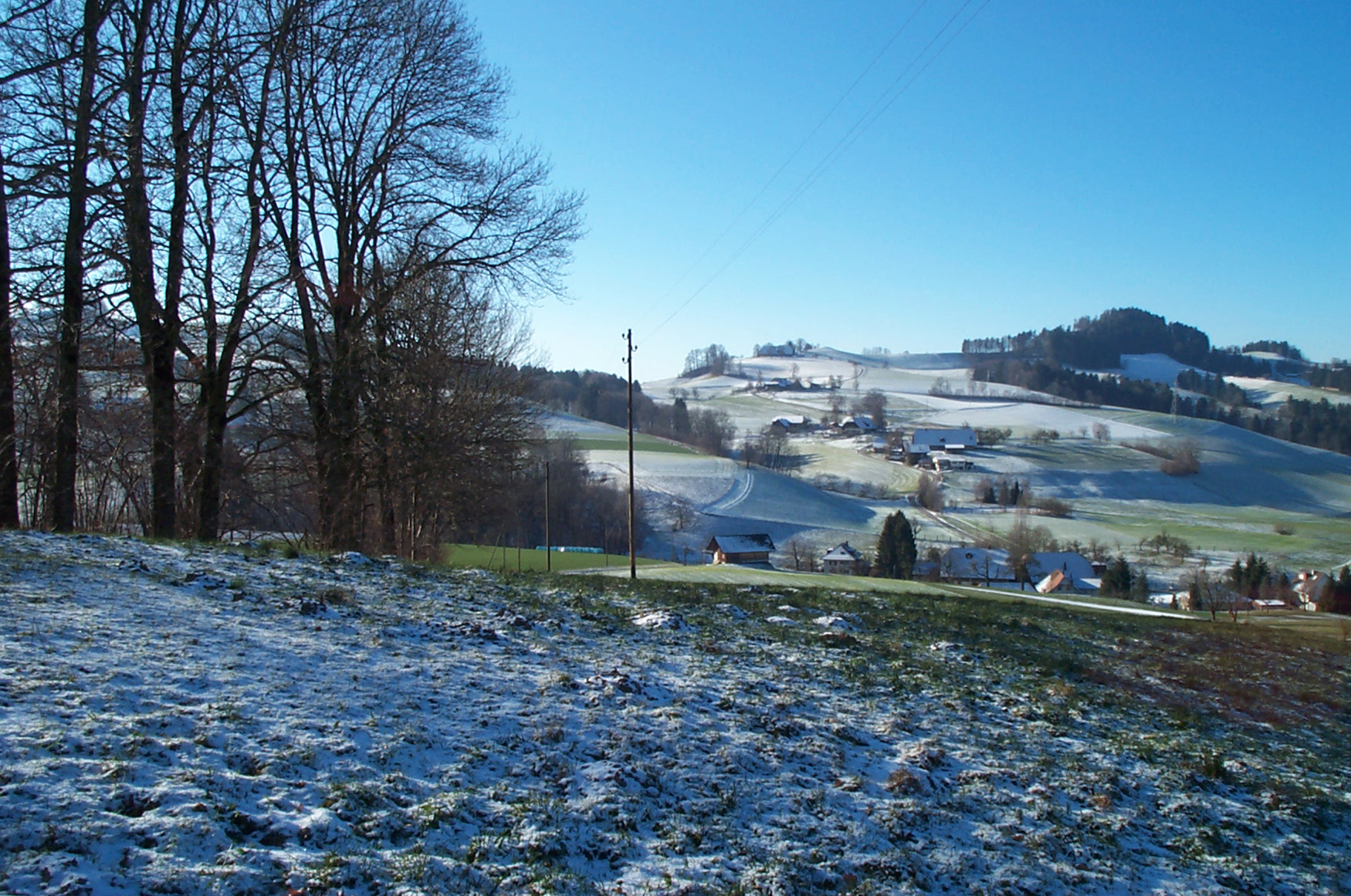
Hamlet of Brönni, Obermuhlern, village of Zimmerwald

Wald has an area of 13.3 km^{2} (5.14 sq mi). As of 2012, a total of 9.9 km^{2} (3.8 mi^{2}) or 74.5% is used for agricultural purposes, while 2.55 km^{2} (0.98 mi^{2}) or 19.2% is forested. The rest of the municipality is 0.83 km^{2} (0.32 mi^{2}) or 6.3% is settled (buildings or roads).

During the same year, housing and buildings made up 3.9% and transportation infrastructure made up 2.1%. A total of 17.5% of the total land area is heavily forested and 1.7% is covered with orchards or small clusters of trees. Of the agricultural land, 40.1% is used for growing crops and 32.7% is pasturage, while 1.7% is used for orchards or vine crops.

On 1 January 2004 the former municipalities of Englisberg and Zimmerwald merged into the municipality of Wald (BE).

On 31 December 2009 Amtsbezirk Seftigen, the municipality's former district, was dissolved. On the following day, 1 January 2010, it joined the newly created Verwaltungskreis Bern-Mittelland.

== Demographics ==
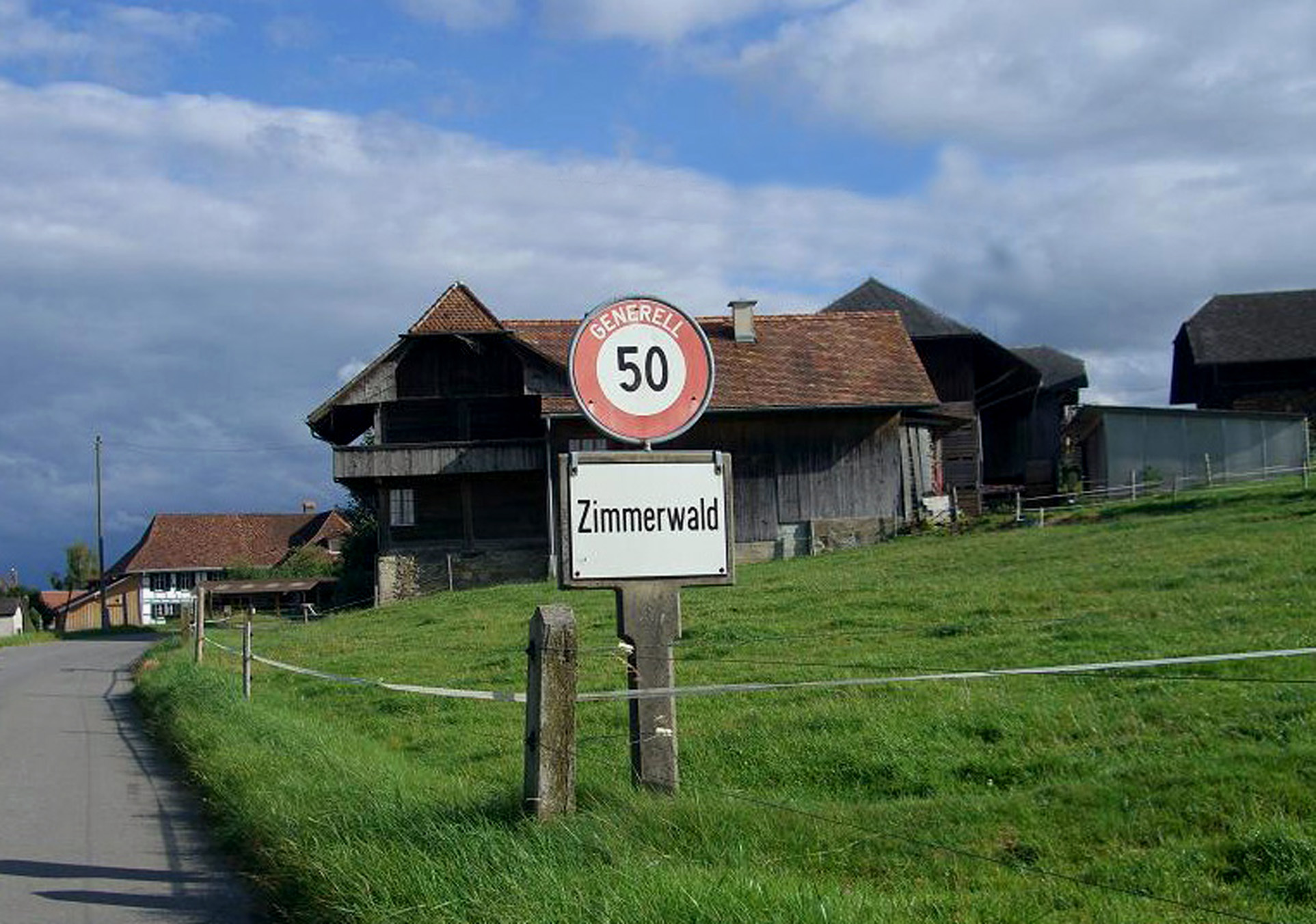
Village entrance of Zimmerwald

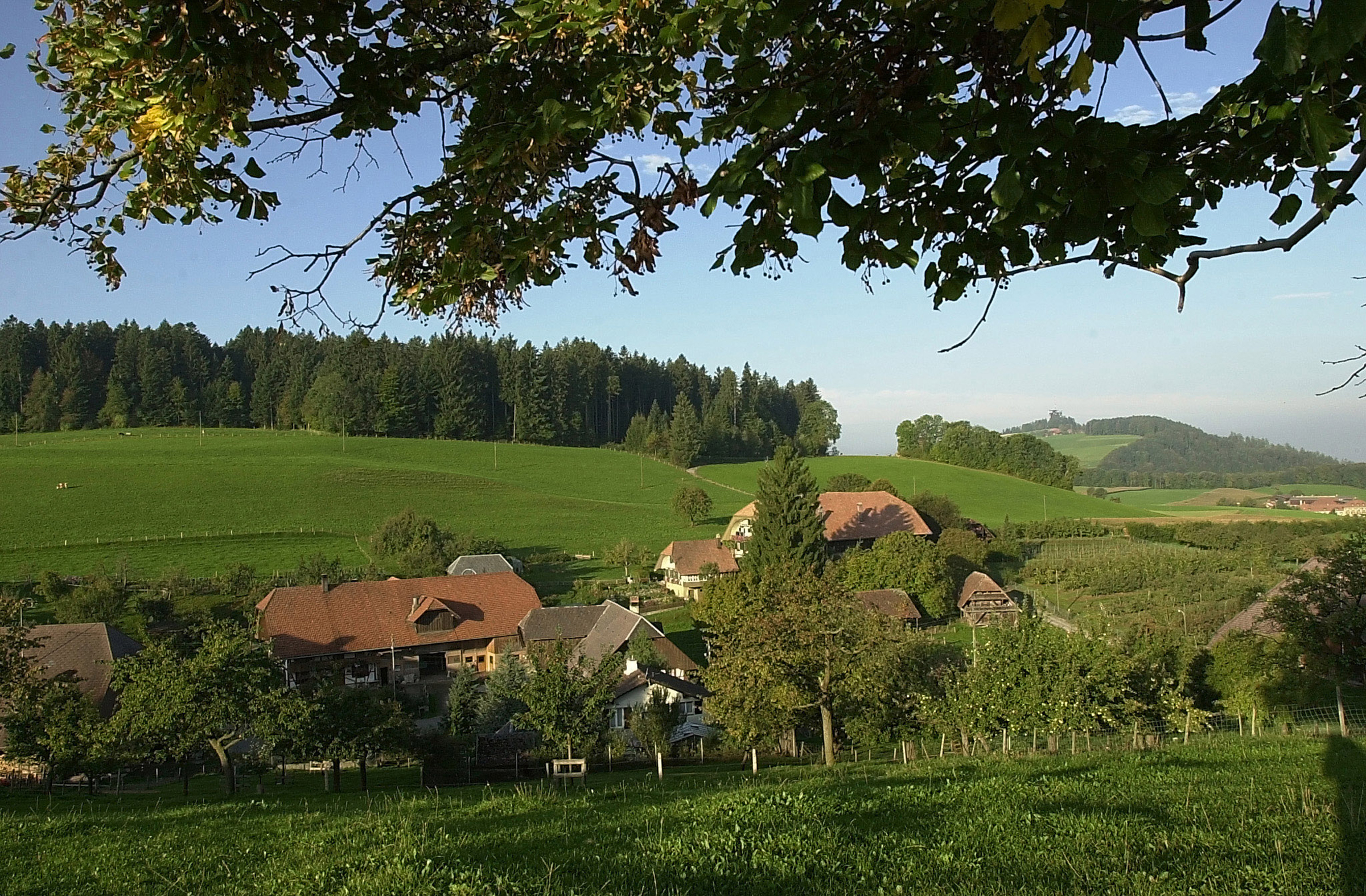
Englisberg village from the southwest

Wald has a population (as of December 2020) of 1,160. As of 2012, 5.7% of the population are resident foreign nationals. Between the last 2 years (2010-2012) the population changed at a rate of 0.8%. Migration accounted for -0.3%, while births and deaths accounted for 0.9%.

Most of the population (as of 2000) speaks German (97.7%) as their first language, French is the second most common (0.6%) and Italian is the third (0.5%).

As of 2008, the population was 48.9% male and 51.1% female. The population was made up of 550 Swiss men (46.8% of the population) and 24 (2.0%) non-Swiss men. There were 568 Swiss women (48.3%) and 33 (2.8%) non-Swiss women.

As of 2012, children and teenagers (0–19 years old) make up 20.2% of the population, while adults (20–64 years old) make up 59.0% and seniors (over 64 years old) make up 20.9%.

As of 2010, there were 118 households that consist of only one person and 33 households with five or more people. The vacancy rate for the municipality, in 2013, was 0.9%. In 2011, single family homes made up 48.5% of the total housing in the municipality.

== Historic population ==
The historical population is given in the following chart:

== Politics ==
In the 2011 federal election the most popular party was the Swiss People's Party (SVP) which received 36.5% of the vote. The next three most popular parties were the Conservative Democratic Party (BDP) (18.0%), the Social Democratic Party (SP) (12.5%) and the Green Party (7.8%). In the federal election, a total of 812 votes were cast, and the voter turnout was 59.8%.

== Economy ==
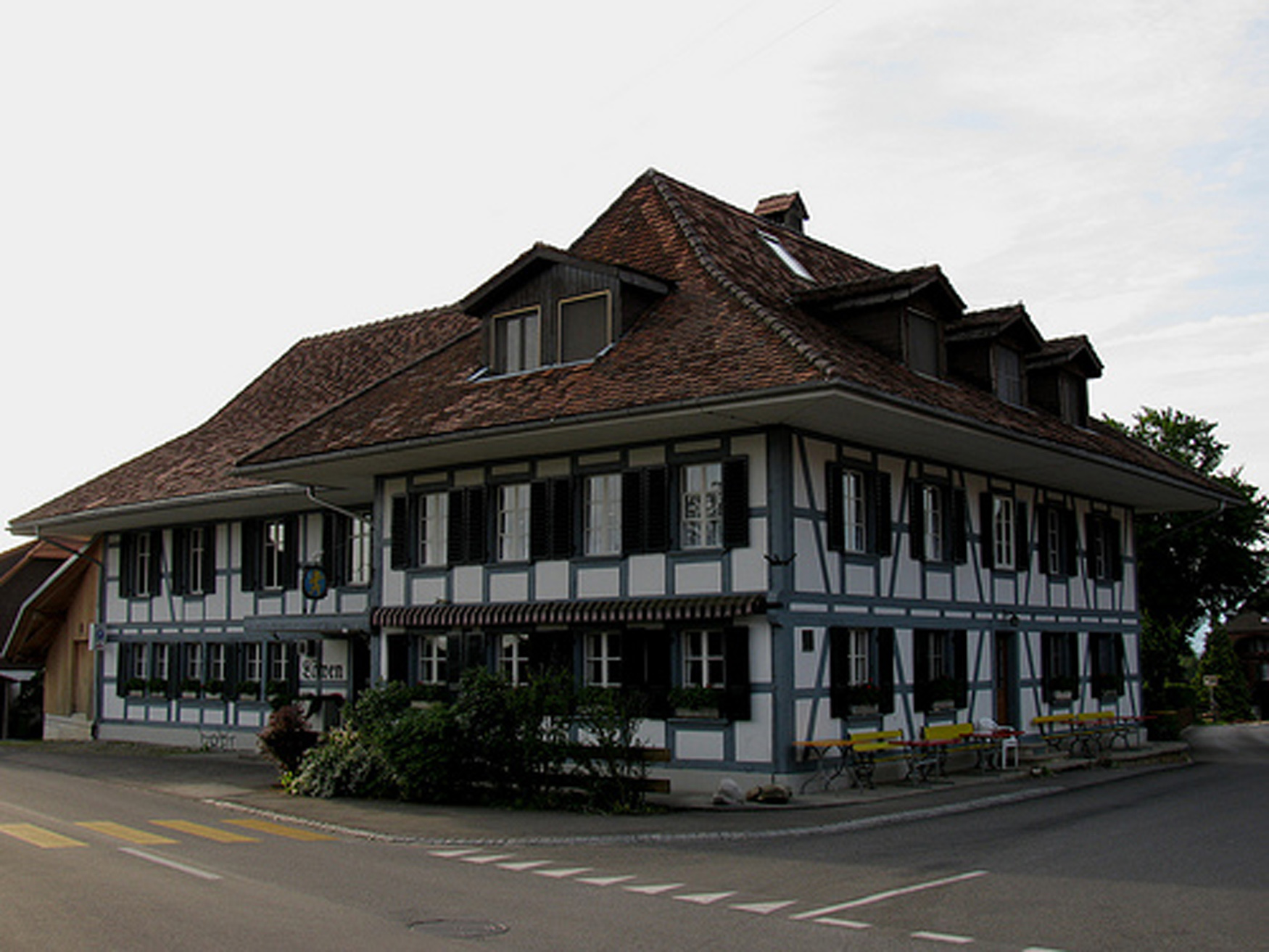
The "Leuen", the local tavern and inn of Zimmerwald, built in 1840

As of 2011, Wald had an unemployment rate of 1.04%. As of 2011, there were a total of 498 people employed in the municipality. Of these, there were 164 people employed in the primary economic sector and about 59 businesses involved in this sector. 16 people were employed in the secondary sector and there were 8 businesses in this sector. 318 people were employed in the tertiary sector, with 63 businesses in this sector.

In 2008 there were a total of 343 full-time equivalent jobs. The number of jobs in the primary sector was 122, of which 113 were in agriculture and 9 were in forestry or lumber production. The number of jobs in the secondary sector was 10 of which 9 or (90.0%) were in manufacturing and 1 was in construction. The number of jobs in the tertiary sector was 211. In the tertiary sector; 10 or 4.7% were in wholesale or retail sales or the repair of motor vehicles, 6 or 2.8% were in the movement and storage of goods, 10 or 4.7% were in a hotel or restaurant, 3 or 1.4% were technical professionals or scientists, and 160 or 75.8% were in health care. Of the working population, 18.9% used public transportation to get to work, and 45.5% used a private car.

In 2011 the average local and cantonal tax rate on a married resident, with two children, of Wald making 150,000 CHF was 12.7%, while an unmarried resident's rate was 18.7%. For comparison, the average rate for the entire canton in the same year, was 14.2% and 22.0%, while the nationwide average was 12.3% and 21.1% respectively.

In 2009 there were a total of 533 tax payers in the municipality. Of that total, 188 made over 75,000 CHF per year. There were 5 people who made between 15,000 and 20,000 per year. The average income of the over 75,000 CHF group in Wald was 119,159 CHF, while the average across all of Switzerland was 130,478 CHF.

In 2011 a total of 0.4% of the population received direct financial assistance from the government.

== Religion ==
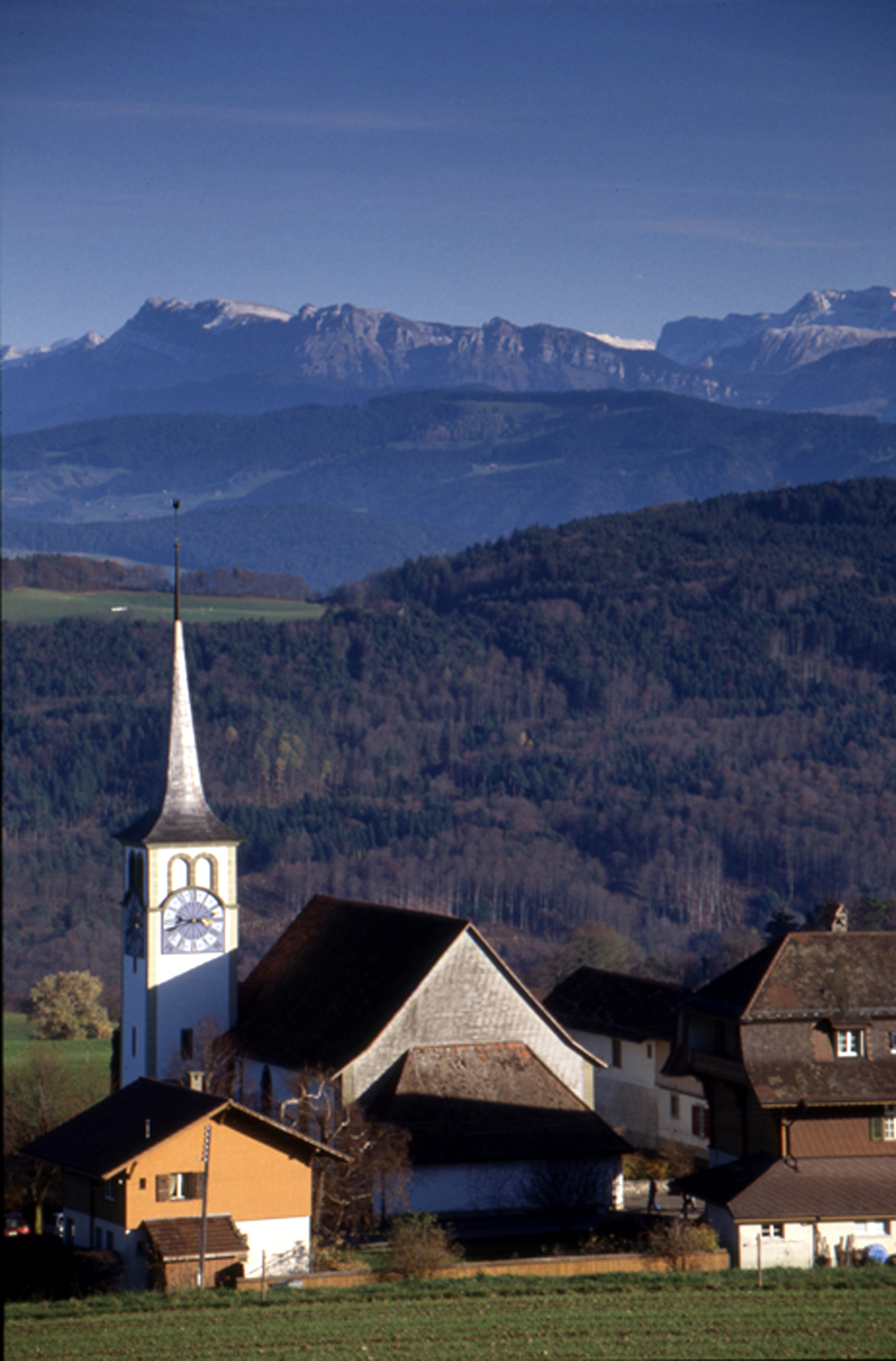
Church of Zimmerwald, view towards Belpberg and Alps

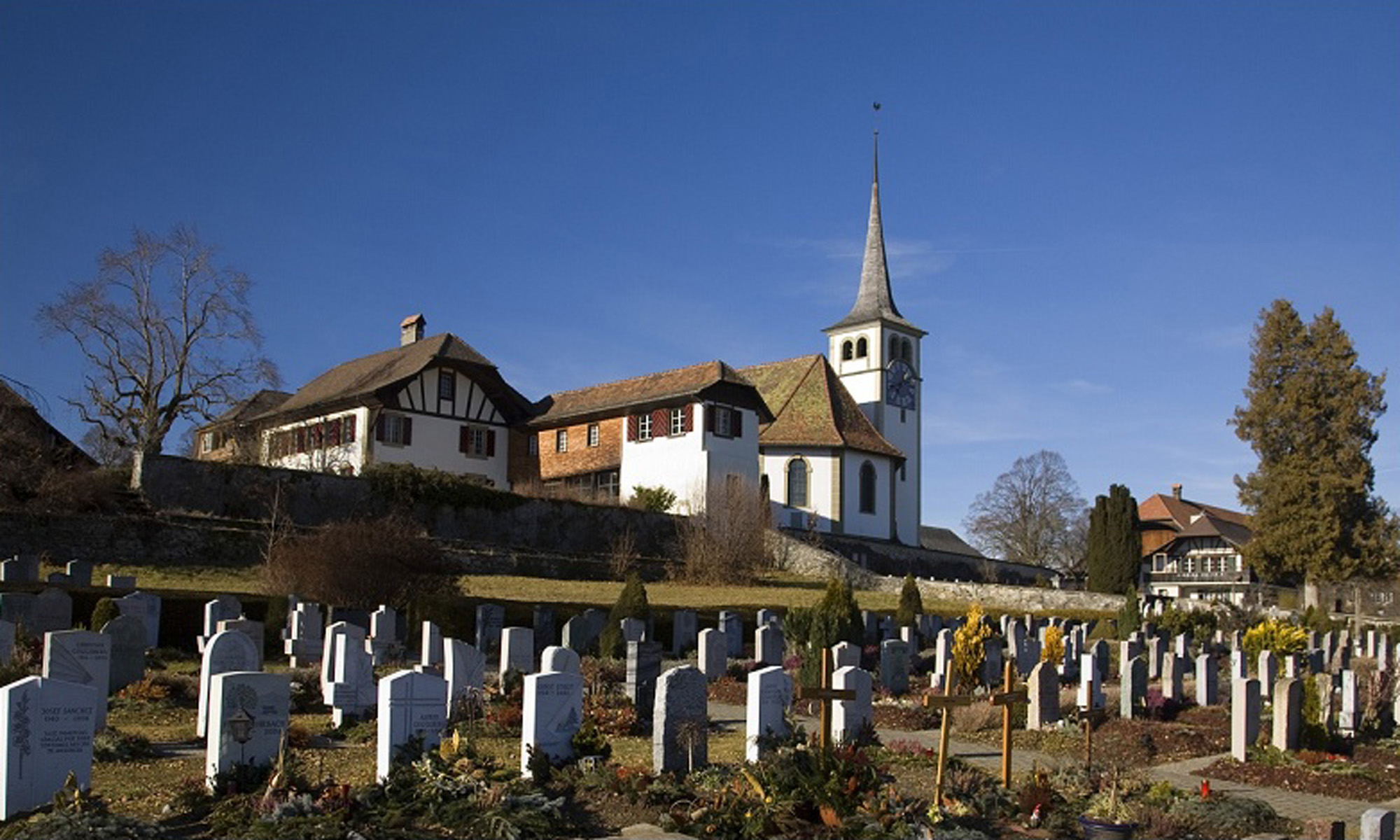
Church of Zimmerwald with adjoining municipal cemetery

In 2000 about 83.2% of the population belonged to a Protestant church, 9.4% were Roman Catholic and 5.2% had no religious affiliation.

== Education ==
In Wald about 57.6% of the population have completed non-mandatory upper secondary education, and 27% have completed additional higher education (either university or a Fachhochschule).

The Canton of Bern school system provides one year of non-obligatory Kindergarten, followed by six years of Primary school. This is followed by three years of obligatory lower Secondary school where the students are separated according to ability and aptitude. Following the lower Secondary students may attend additional schooling or they may enter an apprenticeship.

During the 2011–12 school year, there were a total of 84 students attending classes in Wald. There was one kindergarten class with a total of 18 students in the municipality. Of the kindergarten students, 11.1% were permanent or temporary residents of Switzerland (not citizens) and 5.6% have a different mother language than the classroom language. The municipality had 3 primary classes and 66 students. Of the primary students, 6.1% were permanent or temporary residents of Switzerland (not citizens) and 10.6% have a different mother language than the classroom language.

== Prominent citizens ==
- Rudolf Joder (1950), Swiss politician, National Council
- Bruno Messerli (1931), geographer
- Mark Streit (1977), Swiss hockey player
- Judith Wyder (1988), athlete
