= Englisberg =

Village in the district of Seftigen in Canton Bern, Switzerland

- Former municipality
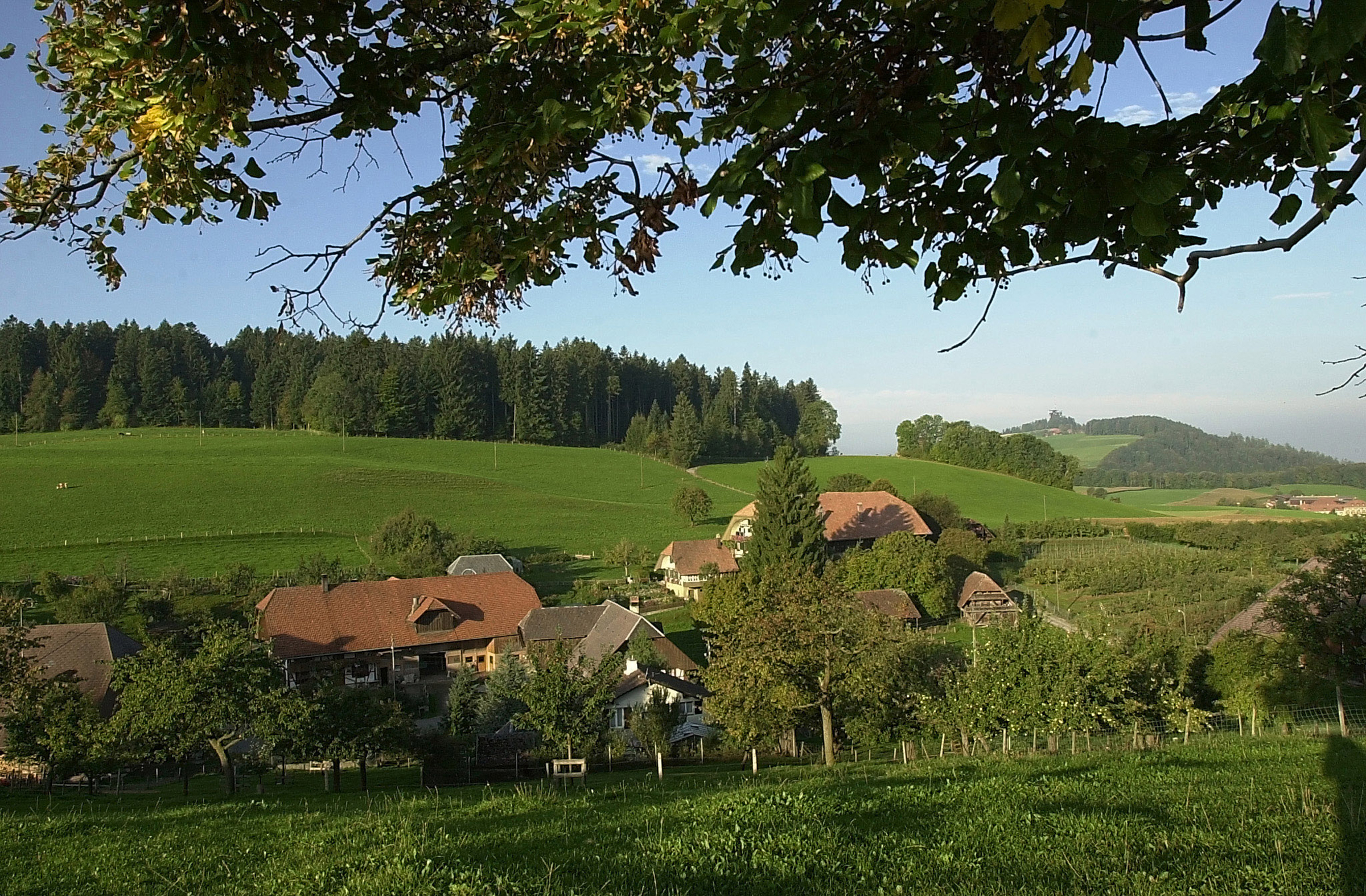
- Englisberg, southwestern view

- Flag Coat of arms
- Location of Englisberg
- Location within Switzerland Location within Canton of Bern
- Coordinates: 46°53′49″N 7°28′09″E
- Country: Switzerland
- Canton: Bern
- District: Bern-Mittelland

Area
  - Total: 4.35 km^{2} (1.68 sq mi)
- Elevation: 815 m (2,674 ft)

Population (2000)
  - Total: 377
  - Density: 86.7/km^{2} (224/sq mi)
- Time zone: UTC+01:00 (CET)
  - Summer (DST): UTC+02:00 (CEST)
- Postal code: 3086
- SFOS number: 864
- ISO 3166 code: CH-BE
- Website

Englisberg is a village in the district of Seftigen in Canton Bern, Switzerland. On January 1, 2004, the independent municipality merged with Zimmerwald to form the new municipality of Wald BE. Situated on the Längenberg, above the valley of the Aare river, it combines the villages of Englisberg and Kühlewil. Englisberg is first documented in 1166 [Endlisperc]. It is believed that Englisberg was created out of the much older village of Kühlewil [Cullenwil, Cullenwilare - originally of Celtic origin] the latter of which having since attained the status of a hamlet of the former. In the 14th century a castle is documented in Englisberg, owned by the family of the same name. It was abandoned by the following 15th century and quickly fell into disrepair and disintegration. The feudal rights over Englisberg were acquired by the von Erlach family of Bern in 1433 and passed in 1542 to the Baumgartner family of the same place. After 1570, these feudal rights were sold to local farming families Guggisberg and Zimmermann which over the course of several generations were split into 70 shares. In the 18th century, these rights were successively purchased by the aristocratic von Graffenried and von Tscharner families seated at the Lohn estate in Kehrsatz only to lose it all when Switzerland was invaded by the French in 1798 that resulted in the abolishment of the ancient order. Englisberg belonged until 1798 to the high court district of Seftigen. Ecclesiastically Englisberg was part of the evangelical reformed parish church of neighboring Belp till 1699 and thereafter was integrated into the newly created parish of Zimmerwald.

Aerial view by Walter Mittelholzer (1925)

Census Data: 1764: 223 inhabitants;1850: 275 inhabitants; 1900: 567 inhabitants;1950: 564 inhabitants; 2000: 214 inhabitants

Predominant surnames with long-established ancestry preceding 1798: - Balsiger, since the 16th century / - Guggisberg, since the 15th century / - Hosmann and Hossmann since the 17th century / - Streit, since the 16th century / - Zimmermann, since the 16th century

Englisberg is the birthplace of former Swiss ice hockey player Mark Streit.

== Prominent Englisberg citizens and residents ==
- Rudolf Joder (1950), Swiss politician, National Council
- Mark Streit (1977), hockey player
