= Niedermuhlern =

- Municipality
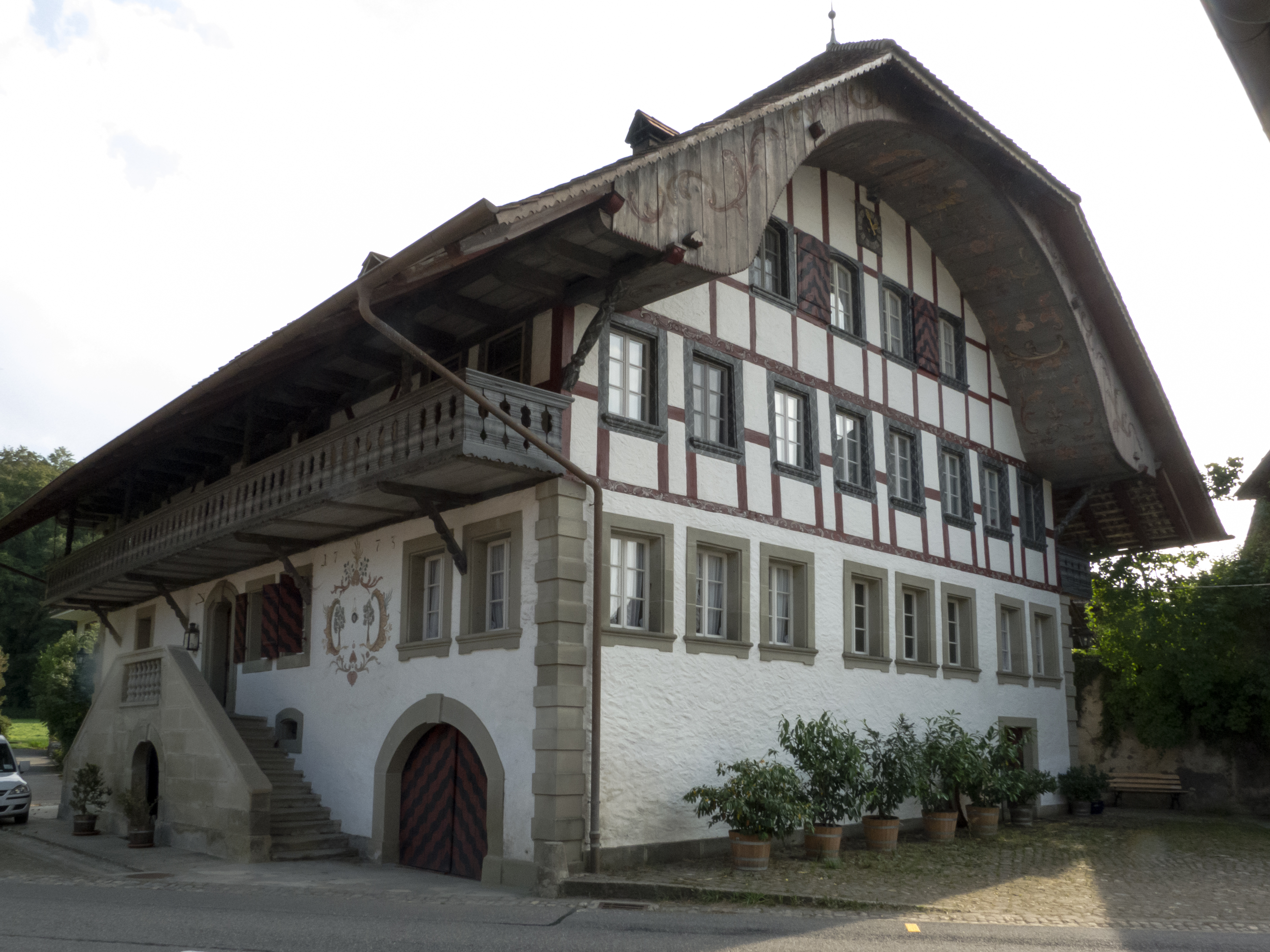
- The historic water mill in Niedermuhlern village

- Flag Coat of arms
- Location of Niedermuhlern
- Location within Switzerland Location within Canton of Bern
- Coordinates: 46°52′N 7°28′E
- Country: Switzerland
- Canton: Bern
- District: Bern-Mittelland

Government
  - Executive: Gemeinderat with 7 members
  - Mayor: Gemeindepräsident(in); Hans Davatz (as of 2026)

Area
  - Total: 7.2 km^{2} (2.8 sq mi)
- Elevation: 829 m (2,720 ft)

Population (December 2020)
  - Total: 512
  - Density: 71/km^{2} (180/sq mi)
- Time zone: UTC+01:00 (CET)
  - Summer (DST): UTC+02:00 (CEST)
- Postal code: 3087
- SFOS number: 877
- ISO 3166 code: CH-BE
- Surrounded by: Oberbalm, Rüeggisberg, Toffen, Wald
- Website: www.niedermuhlern.ch

Niedermuhlern is a municipality in the Bern-Mittelland administrative district in the canton of Bern in Switzerland.

== History ==
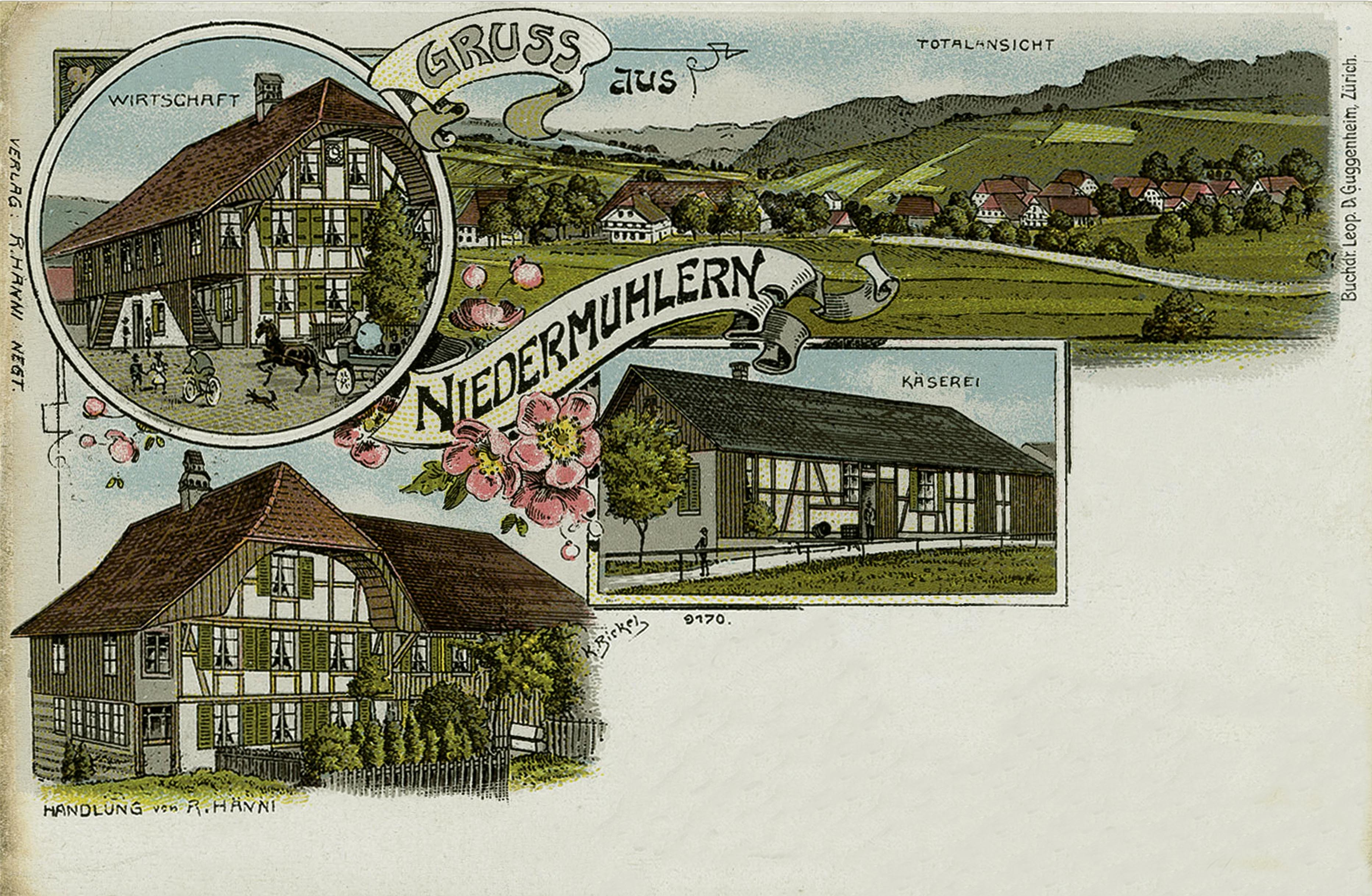
Postcard of Niedermuhlern, about 1900

Niedermuhlern is first mentioned in 1241 as Muolerrun.

The oldest trace of a settlement in the area is a prehistoric bronze ax which was discovered in Niederblacken. The remains of what appears to be a Roman era wall were discovered at Sidenberg, and an early medieval grave was found on the Sandackerhubel. By the 13th century, the portions of the village and surrounding farm land were owned by various citizens of Bern as well as the Münchenbuchsee Commandery and Frienisberg and Köniz Abbeys. The rights to hold the low court over the village passed through several owners until 1600 when Bern acquired them. Under Bernese rule the village was administered by a Schultheiss or mayor. Until 1699, it was part of the parish of Belp. In that year, it was assigned to the Zimmerwald parish.

Throughout its history, the village was a rural, agricultural settlement. Today the Bern-Riggisberg PostAuto line connects it to nearby cities. In 1951, the engineer and businessman Willy Schaerer built the Sternwarte Uecht (Uecht Observatory) in Niedermuhlern. For twenty years, between 1968 until 1988, the University of Bern ran a solar observation lab in the village.

== Geography ==
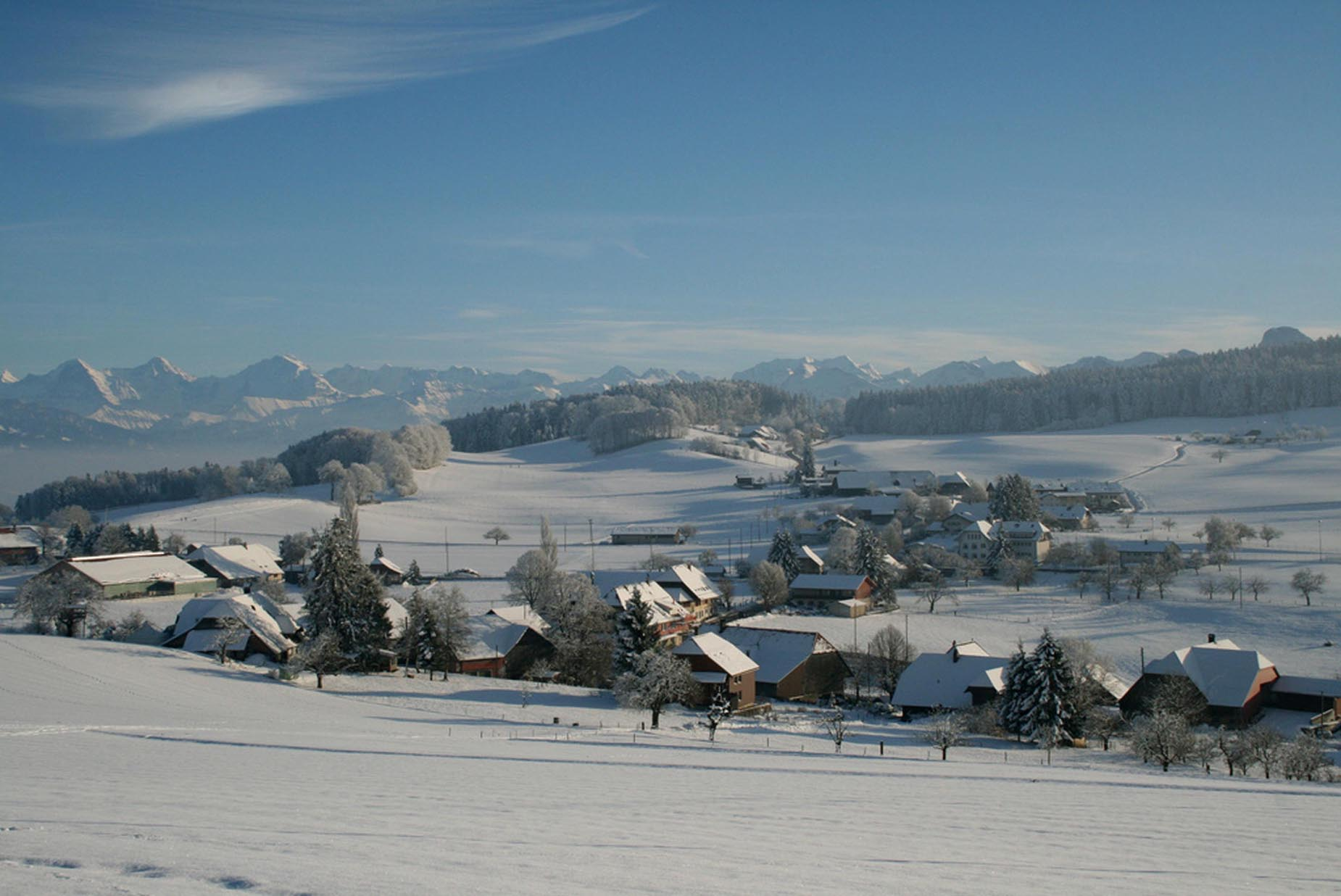
Looking south over Niedermuhlern village toward the Alps

Niedermuhlern has an area of 7.26 km^{2} (2.80 sq mi). As of 2012, a total of 5.46 km^{2} (2.11 mi^{2}) or 75.3% is used for agricultural purposes, while 1.3 km^{2} (0.50 mi^{2}) or 17.9% is forested. The rest of the municipality is 0.44 km^{2} (0.17 mi^{2}) or 6.1% is settled (buildings or roads).

During the same year, housing and buildings made up 2.6% and transportation infrastructure made up 2.8%. A total of 14.8% of the total land area is heavily forested and 3.2% is covered with orchards or small clusters of trees. Of the agricultural land, 40.6% is used for growing crops and 33.8% is pasturage.

The municipality is located on a plateau of Längenberg mountain. It includes the village of Niedermuhlern, the hamlets of Ober- and Niederblacken, Bachmühle, Fallenbach and individual houses.

On 31 December 2009 Amtsbezirk Seftigen, the municipality's former district, was dissolved. On the following day, 1 January 2010, it joined the newly created Verwaltungskreis Bern-Mittelland.

== Coat of arms ==
The blazon of the municipal coat of arms is Azure on a Bend Argent three Mullets bendwise of the field.

== Demographics ==
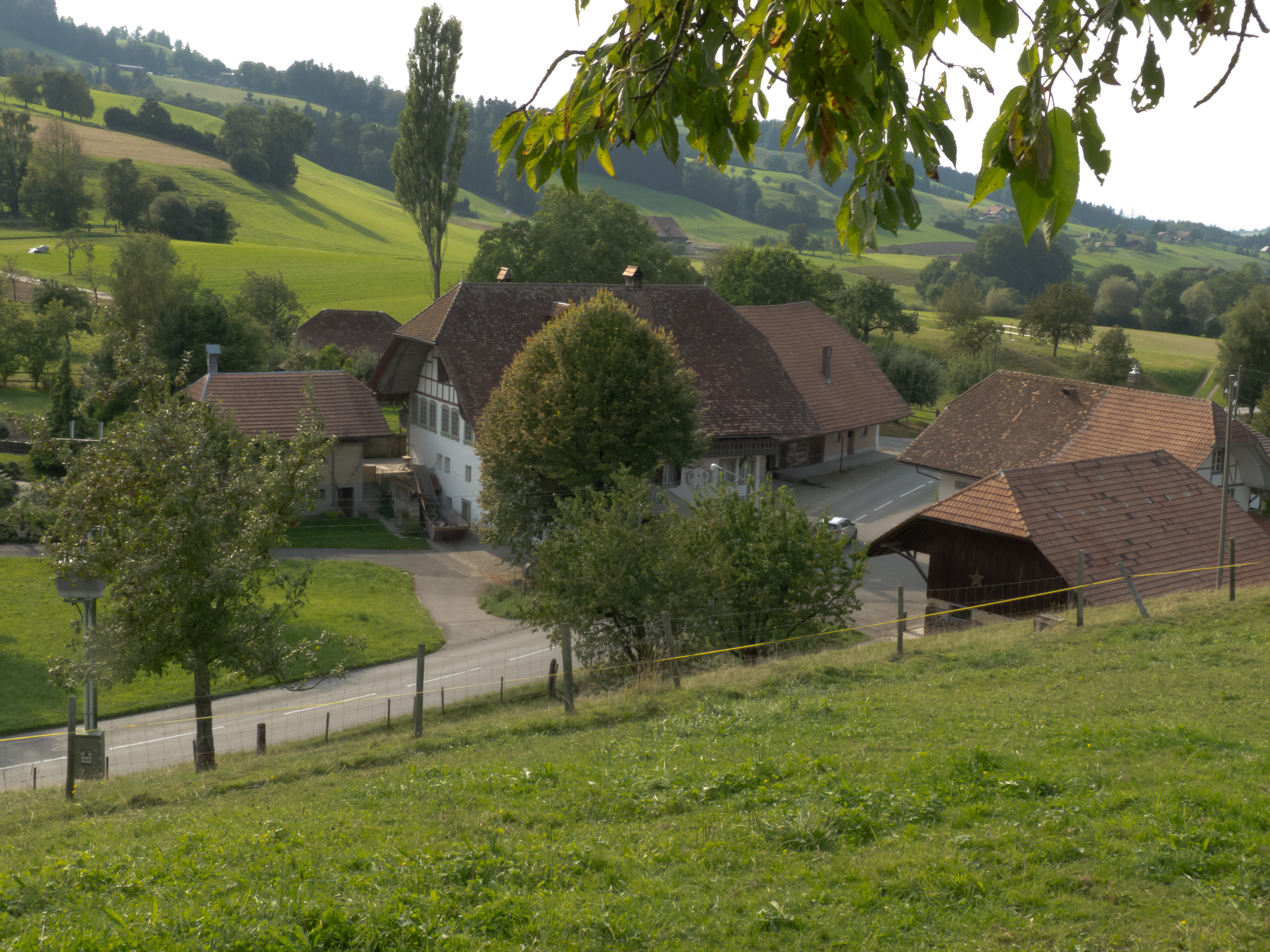
Niedermuhlern water mill and surrounding buildings

Niedermuhlern has a population (as of December 2020) of 512. As of 2012, 4.6% of the population are resident foreign nationals. Over the last 2 years (2010-2012) the population has changed at a rate of -0.6%. Migration accounted for -1.3%, while births and deaths accounted for -0.2%.

Most of the population (as of 2000) speaks German (521 or 99.6%) as their first language. One person speaks French and another speaks Spanish as their first languages.

As of 2008, the population was 53.0% male and 47.0% female. The population was made up of 238 Swiss men (51.3% of the population) and 8 (1.7%) non-Swiss men. There were 216 Swiss women (46.6%) and 2 (0.4%) non-Swiss women. Of the population in the municipality, 220 or about 42.1% were born in Niedermuhlern and lived there in 2000. There were 237 or 45.3% who were born in the same canton, while 42 or 8.0% were born somewhere else in Switzerland, and 6 or 1.1% were born outside of Switzerland.

As of 2012, children and teenagers (0–19 years old) make up 19.7% of the population, while adults (20–64 years old) make up 63.8% and seniors (over 64 years old) make up 16.5%.

As of 2000, there were 239 people who were single and never married in the municipality. There were 251 married individuals, 24 widows or widowers and 9 individuals who are divorced.

As of 2010, there were 51 households that consist of only one person and 13 households with five or more people. In 2000, a total of 176 apartments (86.3% of the total) were permanently occupied, while 20 apartments (9.8%) were seasonally occupied and 8 apartments (3.9%) were empty. The vacancy rate for the municipality, in 2013, was 2.1459227468%. In 2011, single family homes made up 24.7% of the total housing in the municipality.

The historical population is given in the following chart:

== Economy ==
As of 2011, Niedermuhlern had an unemployment rate of 0.76%. As of 2011, there were a total of 136 people employed in the municipality. Of these, there were 91 people employed in the primary economic sector and about 32 businesses involved in this sector. 7 people were employed in the secondary sector and there were 4 businesses in this sector. 38 people were employed in the tertiary sector, with 13 businesses in this sector. There were 269 residents of the municipality who were employed in some capacity, of which females made up 45.0% of the workforce.

In 2008 there were a total of 92 full-time equivalent jobs. The number of jobs in the primary sector was 61, all of which were in agriculture. The number of jobs in the secondary sector was 7, all of which were in manufacturing. The number of jobs in the tertiary sector was 24. In the tertiary sector; 7 or 29.2% were in wholesale or retail sales or the repair of motor vehicles, 2 or 8.3% were in a hotel or restaurant, 8 or 33.3% were in education and 2 or 8.3% were in health care.

In 2000, there were 40 workers who commuted into the municipality and 159 workers who commuted away. The municipality is a net exporter of workers, with about 4.0 workers leaving the municipality for every one entering. A total of 110 workers (73.3% of the 150 total workers in the municipality) both lived and worked in Niedermuhlern. Of the working population, 15.2% used public transportation to get to work, and 48.3% used a private car.

In 2011, the average local and cantonal tax rate on a married resident, with two children, of Niedermuhlern making 150,000 CHF was 13%, while an unmarried resident's rate was 19.1%. For comparison, the average rate for the entire canton in the same year, was 14.2% and 22.0%, while the nationwide average was 12.3% and 21.1% respectively.

In 2009, there were a total of 199 tax payers in the municipality. Of that total, 44 made over 75,000 CHF per year. There were 2 people who made between 15,000 and 20,000 per year. The greatest number of workers, 60, made between 50,000 and 75,000 CHF per year. The average income of the over 75,000 CHF group in Niedermuhlern was 108,434 CHF, while the average across all of Switzerland was 130,478 CHF.

In 2011, a total of 0.9% of the population received direct financial assistance from the government.

== Religion ==
From the 2000 census, 430 or 82.2% belonged to the Swiss Reformed Church, while 21 or 4.0% were Roman Catholic. Of the rest of the population, there were 40 individuals (or about 7.65% of the population) who belonged to another Christian church. 26 (or about 4.97% of the population) belonged to no church, are agnostic or atheist, and 6 individuals (or about 1.15% of the population) did not answer the question.

== Education ==
In Niedermuhlern about 58.2% of the population have completed non-mandatory upper secondary education, and 14.4% have completed additional higher education (either university or a Fachhochschule). Of the 45 who had completed some form of tertiary schooling listed in the census, 77.8% were Swiss men, 22.2% were Swiss women.

The Canton of Bern school system provides one year of non-obligatory Kindergarten, followed by six years of Primary school. This is followed by three years of obligatory lower Secondary school where the students are separated according to ability and aptitude. Following the lower Secondary students may attend additional schooling or they may enter an apprenticeship.

During the 2011-12 school year, there were a total of 56 students attending classes in Niedermuhlern. There was one kindergarten class with a total of 8 students in the municipality. Of the kindergarten students, 12.5% were permanent or temporary residents of Switzerland (not citizens). The municipality had one primary class and 25 students. During the same year, there were 2 lower secondary classes with a total of 23 students. There were 4.3% who were permanent or temporary residents of Switzerland (not citizens) and 4.3% have a different mother language than the classroom language.

As of 2000, there were a total of 152 students attending any school in the municipality. Of those, 62 both lived and attended school in the municipality, while 90 students came from another municipality. During the same year, 23 residents attended schools outside the municipality.
