= Uecht Observatory =

Sternwarte Uecht
- Alternative names: Space Eye Observatory
- Organization: Stiftung Privatsternwarte 'Uecht' Dr. h.c. Willy Schaerer
- Observatory code: 009
- Location: Längenberg, Niedermuhlern, Canton of Bern, Switzerland
- Coordinates: 46.8524°N 7.4529°E
- Established: 1951
- Website: sternwarteuecht.astronomie.ch

Sternwarte Uecht is an observatory on Längenberg at Niedermuhlern, Canton of Bern, Switzerland.
