= Mark Streit =

Swiss ice hockey player (born 1977)

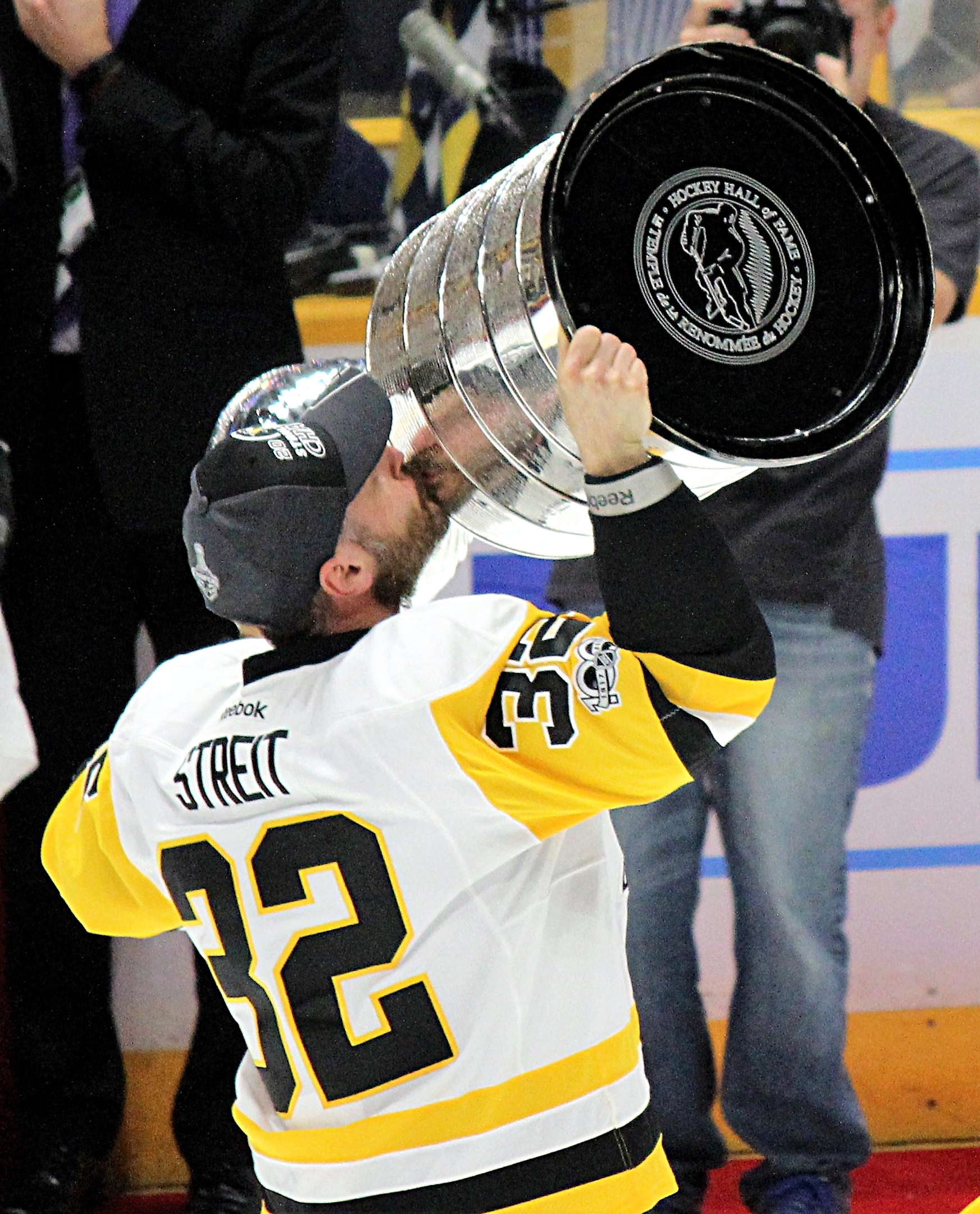
- Streit with the Pittsburgh Penguins in 2017
- Born: 11 December 1977 (age 48) Englisberg, Switzerland
- Height: 5 ft 11 in (180 cm)
- Weight: 205 lb (93 kg; 14 st 9 lb)
- Position: Defence
- Shot: Left
- Played for: Fribourg-Gottéron; Davos; ZSC Lions; Montreal Canadiens; New York Islanders; SC Bern; Philadelphia Flyers; Pittsburgh Penguins
- National team: Switzerland
- NHL draft: 262nd overall, 2004; Montreal Canadiens
- Playing career: 1995–2017

Mark Thomas Streit (born 11 December 1977) is a Swiss former professional ice hockey defenceman. He was formerly the captain of both the New York Islanders and the Swiss national team. Streit was one of the few swingmen in the NHL who could play both as a defenceman and as a forward. He was inducted into the IIHF Hall of Fame in 2020.

== Playing career ==
=== Switzerland ===
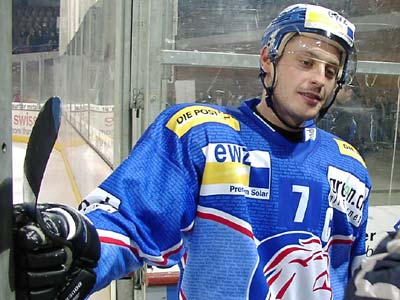
Streit while with the ZSC Lions in 2006.

Streit began his career in the Swiss Nationalliga A with Fribourg-Gottéron in 1995–96 as an 18-year-old. The following year, he transferred to Davos and improved to a 25-point campaign in 44 games in 1998–99, his third season with the team.

Garnering attention from the National Hockey League (NHL), but being undrafted at the time, he bounced around the minor leagues in the 1999–2000 season, playing the majority of the season with the Springfield Falcons of the American Hockey League (AHL).

Streit returned to the Nationalliga and spent five seasons with the ZSC Lions after his brief North American stint. He helped the ZSC Lions to a Swiss championship in 2001, as well as back-to-back IIHF Continental Cups in 2001 and 2002. After a 12-goal, 36-point season in 48 games in 2003–04, Streit was drafted in the 2004 NHL entry draft, 262nd overall, by the Montreal Canadiens at 26 years old (players are typically drafted at the age of 18).

As the 2004–05 NHL season was cancelled due to a lockout, Streit remained with the Lions for one more season and posted a career high 14 goals, 29 assists and 43 points in 44 games.

=== Montreal Canadiens ===
In the 2005–06 season, Streit made his NHL debut with the Canadiens, appearing in 48 games and recording 11 points. On 16 March 2006, in a game against the Carolina Hurricanes, Streit was joined by two other Swiss players playing in the NHL at the time, the Canadiens' goaltender David Aebischer and the Hurricanes' goaltender Martin Gerber.

Streit continued to make strides the following season, improving to 36 points in 76 games before emerging as an elite NHL defenceman in his third season with the Canadiens. In the 2007–08 season, he finished third in league scoring among defencemen, behind Nicklas Lidström and Sergei Gonchar, with 62 points in 81 games. Streit was made the Canadiens' nomination for the Bill Masterton Trophy, awarded for perseverance and dedication to hockey.

=== New York Islanders ===
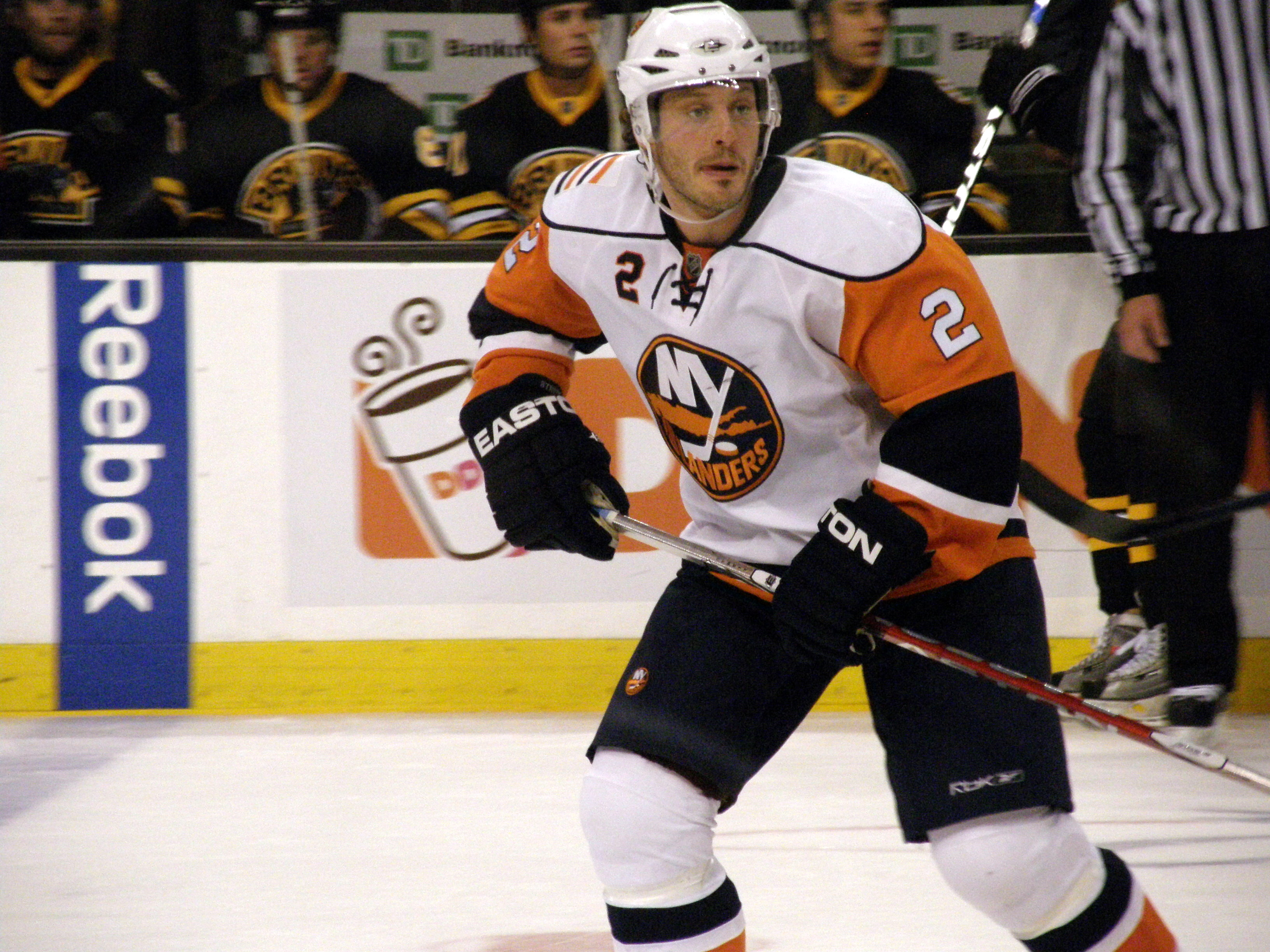
Streit playing for the New York Islanders

Coming off a breakout campaign, Streit became an unrestricted free agent on 1 July 2008, and signed a five-year, $20.5 million contract with the New York Islanders. Upon signing with the Islanders, Streit became the second-highest paid Swiss professional athlete, behind Roger Federer. During his first season with the Islanders, Streit was selected to appear in his first NHL All-Star Game in 2009. In his first season with the team, Streit led the Islanders in scoring with 56 points, becoming only the second defenseman to lead his team in scoring since the NHL lockout. The first was Ľubomír Višňovský, who led the Los Angeles Kings with 67 points in 2005–06.

On 25 September 2010, Streit tore his shoulder labrum and rotator cuff after a routine check into the boards by teammate Matt Moulson during a scrimmage. He was sidelined for the entire 2010–11 season.

Streit became the first Swiss-born team captain in NHL history, when the Islanders appointed him to the position on September 21, 2011.

During the 2012–13 lockout, Streit played for SC Bern of the Swiss National League A.

=== Philadelphia Flyers ===
Streit, who became an unrestricted free agent entering the summer of 2013, had his rights traded from the Islanders to the Philadelphia Flyers on 12 June 2013, for Shane Harper and a fourth-round draft pick in the 2014 NHL entry draft. Although contract negotiations were lengthy, Streit signed a four-year, $21 million deal with the Flyers on 28 June. Following the signing, Flyers general manager Paul Holmgren described him as a great addition for the team for he was "a guy who can play on the power play, a guy who can provide offense [at] 5-on-5, a defenseman who gets up in the rush and joins the rush, and at times can lead the rush and make plays come out of our end." After attending the Flyers' training camp, Streit was named to their opening night roster for the 2013–14 season. Although he began the season producing at a slower pace than before, he picked up by the second half and saw time on the Flyers' top power play unit. Streit finished the 2013–14 season with 10 goals and 34 assists for 44 points through 82 games. As the Flyers qualified for the 2014 Stanley Cup playoffs, Streit continued to man the second defence pairing with Nicklas Grossmann for their first round series against the New York Rangers.

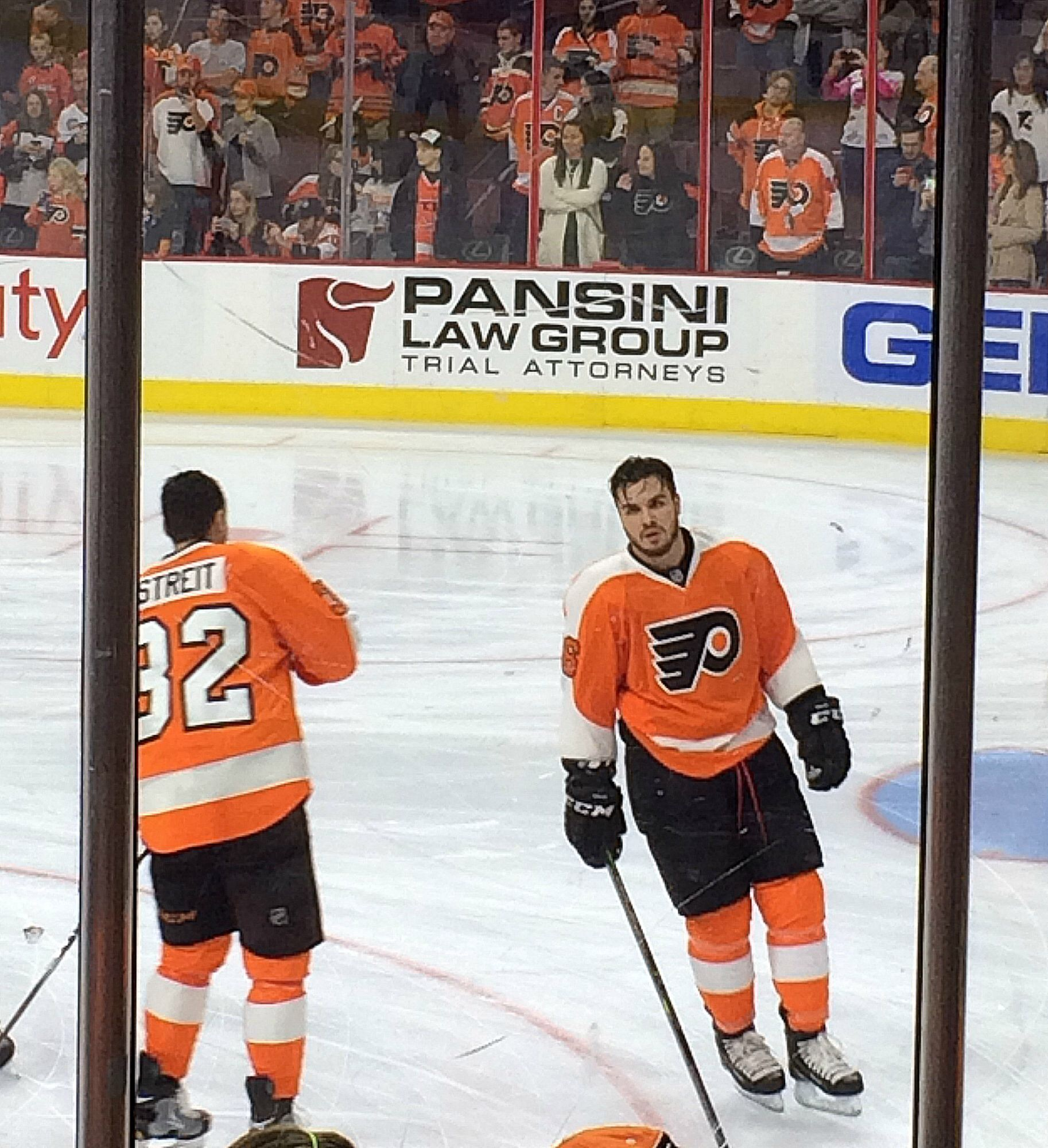
Streit (left) and teammate Zac Rinaldo warming up before a game.

Following the 2013–14 season, Streit was named an alternate captain for the Flyers alongside Wayne Simmonds and captain Claude Giroux. As a result of a long term injury to Kimmo Timonen, Streit stepped into a larger role on the Flyers top power play unit. During the pre-season, Streit led all defensemen in scoring and tied for second overall with eight points through four games. This continued into the regular season and Streit entered the month of December leading all Flyers defensemen in goals, assists, and points, and leading the entire team in time-on-ice per-game. By the end of December, Streit led team defensemen with 23 points and ranked 10th amongst defensemen in the league. He also quickly became the Flyers defensemen in five years to reach and pass the 50-point milestone. He finished his second season with the team recording nine goals and 43 assists for 52 points to tie for eight among lead defensemen in points. As a result of his productive season, Streit received the Barry Ashbee Trophy as the team's most outstanding defenseman and the Yanick Dupre Memorial Class Guy Award.

The 2014–15 season would prove to be his most productive with the Flyers as his next two seasons were marred with injuries. Although Streit began the 2015–16 season healthy, he suffered a pelvic injury in mid-November and required surgery. At the time of the injury, he had accumulated three goals and six assists. After missing 19 games, Streit returned to Flyers lineup on 31 December for their 4–2 loss to the San Jose Sharks. He struggled to match his previous scoring prowess and recorded only one goal and two assists in his first 24 games back. He was also replaced on the teams' top power-play unit by Shayne Gostisbehere. As such, he was the discussion of many trade rumours leading up to the NHL Trade Deadline but was kept on the team. On 7 March, Streit played his 700th career NHL game. Streit and the Flyers once again qualified for the Stanley Cup playoffs and faced off against the Washington Capitals in the first round.

Streit returned to the Flyers for what would be his final season with the team. As with his previous seasons, Streit began the season producing offensively and defensively for the Flyers. By 12 December 2016, he averaged nearly 20 minutes per game, including 2:23 on the team's power play, and led all team defencemen in goals with five. His offensive prowess helped the Flyers maintain a nine-game winning streak for the first time since they set a franchise-record 13-game winning streak in 1985. His efforts were cut short however when he suffered an upper-body injury in early December.

=== Pittsburgh Penguins ===
On 1 March 2017, Streit was traded hours before the deadline in a deal with the Tampa Bay Lightning where the Flyers received Valtteri Filppula, a fourth-round pick in the 2017 NHL Draft, and a conditional seventh-round pick. The Tampa Bay Lightning then instantly traded him to the Pittsburgh Penguins for a fourth-round pick in the 2018 NHL entry draft. Streit played 19 games for the Penguins during the regular season, scoring once and adding five assists, as the Penguins qualified for the 2017 Stanley Cup playoffs. He remained a healthy scratch through the Penguins' first two series before making his Penguins postseason debut in game three of the Eastern Conference Final against the Ottawa Senators. As injuries befell onto Justin Schultz and Trevor Daley, Streit continued to stay in the lineup. He recorded two assists through three games as the Penguins won the Stanley Cup after defeating the Nashville Predators in the 2017 Stanley Cup Final.

=== Return to Montreal and retirement ===
On 25 July 2017, Streit signed as a free agent to a one-year, $700,000 deal in a return to the Montreal Canadiens. On 12 October 2017, the Canadiens placed Streit on waivers just 4 games into the season. He cleared waivers, but refused to report to the Canadiens' AHL affiliate, the Laval Rocket. Consequently, Streit was placed on unconditional waivers on October 15 effectively ending his NHL career. He and the Canadiens came to a mutual agreement to terminate his contract the next day.

On 30 October 2017, Streit announced his retirement from professional hockey after 12 NHL seasons.

== International play ==
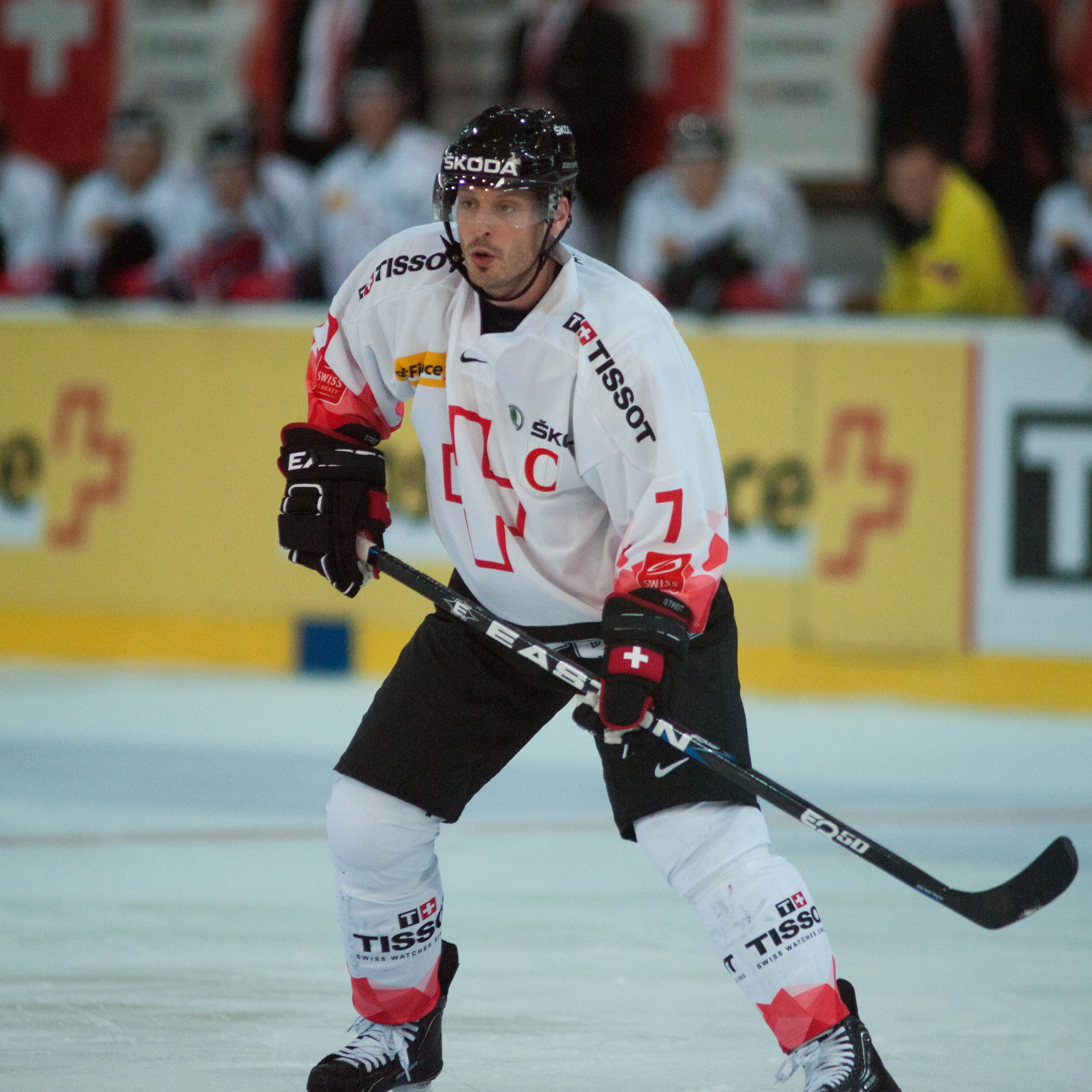
Streit with the Swiss national team in 2012.

Streit made his international debut at the 1995 European Junior Championships, then appeared in his first of two World Junior Championships in 1996. He scored one goal in five games as Switzerland finished ninth. In 1997, he scored two goals and Switzerland improved to seventh.

In 1998, Streit appeared in his first of ten consecutive World Championships. Playing as the host nation, Switzerland finished a surprising fourth, falling to the Czech Republic in the bronze-medal game. He scored an international career-best seven points in seven games in 2005, as Switzerland advanced to the quarter-finals, losing to Sweden 2–1.

Streit competed in his first Winter Olympics in 2002 in Salt Lake City. He scored two points in four preliminary games as Switzerland finished 11th.

As Streit was named team captain at the 2006 Winter Olympics in Turin, Switzerland improved to sixth, topping international giants Czech Republic and Canada in their preliminary games. Streit scored the game-winning goal against the Czechs to defeat them 3–2 in the Swiss' second round-robin game, then assisted on the second goal of a 2–0 upset against Canada two days later. Following the stunning Swiss victory over Canada, an incredulous Streit admitted, "I never thought we could do that." In the quarter-finals, Streit scored in the first period to tie the game 1–1, but the Swiss were overpowered by Sweden 6–2.

== Off the ice ==
Streit and his wife Fabienne have one daughter together.

Streit was featured on the front cover of the Swiss versions of the NHL series of hockey games, from NHL 08 to NHL 11.

== Career statistics ==
=== Regular season and playoffs ===
			Regular season					Playoffs
Season	Team	League	GP	G	A	Pts	PIM	GP	G	A	Pts	PIM
1994–95	HC Fribourg–Gottéron	SUI U20	30	5	10	15	—	2	0	0	0	—
1995–96	HC Fribourg–Gottéron	SUI U20	9	4	8	12	—	3	0	1	1	—
1995–96	HC Fribourg–Gottéron	NDA	34	2	2	4	6	—	—	—	—	—
1996–97	HC Davos	SUI U20	4	1	1	2	14	—	—	—	—	—
1996–97	HC Davos	NDA	46	2	9	11	18	6	0	0	0	0
1997–98	HC Davos	NDA	38	4	10	14	14	18	1	5	6	20
1998–99	HC Davos	NDA	44	7	18	25	42	6	3	3	6	8
1999–00	Tallahassee Tiger Sharks	ECHL	14	0	5	5	16	—	—	—	—	—
1999–00	Utah Grizzlies	IHL	1	0	1	1	2	—	—	—	—	—
1999–00	Springfield Falcons	AHL	43	3	12	15	18	5	0	0	0	2
2000–01	ZSC Lions	NLA	44	5	11	16	48	16	2	5	7	37
2001–02	ZSC Lions	NLA	28	7	16	23	36	14	0	6	6	10
2002–03	ZSC Lions	NLA	37	4	20	24	62	12	1	7	8	2
2003–04	ZSC Lions	NLA	48	12	24	36	78	13	5	2	7	14
2004–05	ZSC Lions	NLA	44	14	29	43	46	15	4	11	15	20
2005–06	Montreal Canadiens	NHL	48	2	9	11	28	1	0	0	0	0
2006–07	Montreal Canadiens	NHL	76	10	26	36	14	—	—	—	—	—
2007–08	Montreal Canadiens	NHL	81	13	49	62	28	11	1	3	4	8
2008–09	New York Islanders	NHL	74	16	40	56	62	—	—	—	—	—
2009–10	New York Islanders	NHL	82	11	38	49	48	—	—	—	—	—
2011–12	New York Islanders	NHL	82	7	40	47	46	—	—	—	—	—
2012–13	SC Bern	NLA	32	7	19	26	30	—	—	—	—	—
2012–13	New York Islanders	NHL	48	6	21	27	22	6	2	3	5	4
2013–14	Philadelphia Flyers	NHL	82	10	34	44	44	7	1	2	3	0
2014–15	Philadelphia Flyers	NHL	81	9	43	52	36	—	—	—	—	—
2015–16	Philadelphia Flyers	NHL	62	6	17	23	18	6	0	1	1	6
2016–17	Philadelphia Flyers	NHL	49	5	16	21	22	—	—	—	—	—
2016–17	Pittsburgh Penguins	NHL	19	1	5	6	6	3	0	2	2	0
2017–18	Montreal Canadiens	NHL	2	0	0	0	0	—	—	—	—	—
NDA/NLA totals			395	64	158	222	380	100	16	39	55	111
NHL totals			786	96	338	434	374	34	4	11	15	18

=== International ===
Year	Team	Event	GP	G	A	Pts	PIM
1995	Switzerland	EJC	5	1	2	3	6
1996	Switzerland	WJC	5	1	0	1	4
1997	Switzerland	WJC	6	2	0	2	31
1997	Switzerland	OGQ	4	0	0	0	2
1998	Switzerland	WC	9	0	0	0	2
1999	Switzerland	WC	6	4	0	4	2
2000	Switzerland	WC	7	0	1	1	4
2001	Switzerland	WC	6	0	3	3	2
2002	Switzerland	OG	4	1	1	2	0
2002	Switzerland	WC	6	0	3	3	4
2003	Switzerland	WC	7	0	4	4	10
2004	Switzerland	WC	7	1	1	2	2
2005	Switzerland	OGQ	3	1	2	3	8
2005	Switzerland	WC	7	1	6	7	4
2006	Switzerland	OG	6	2	1	3	6
2006	Switzerland	WC	6	0	3	3	6
2007	Switzerland	WC	7	1	3	4	6
2009	Switzerland	WC	6	1	4	5	8
2010	Switzerland	OG	5	0	3	3	0
2012	Switzerland	WC	7	2	2	4	6
2014	Switzerland	OG	4	0	1	1	2
2015	Switzerland	WC	8	0	2	2	6
2016	Team Europe	WCH	6	0	0	0	4
Junior totals			16	4	2	6	41
Senior totals			114	13	38	51	74

- All statistics taken from NHL.com

== Awards and honors ==
Award	Year
NHL
NHL All-Star Game	2009
Stanley Cup champion	2017
International
IIHF Hall of Fame	2020
IIHF All-Time Switzerland Team	2020

Preceded by Doug Weight	New York Islanders captain 2011–13	Succeeded by John Tavares
