= Rudolf Joder =

Swiss politician (born 1950)

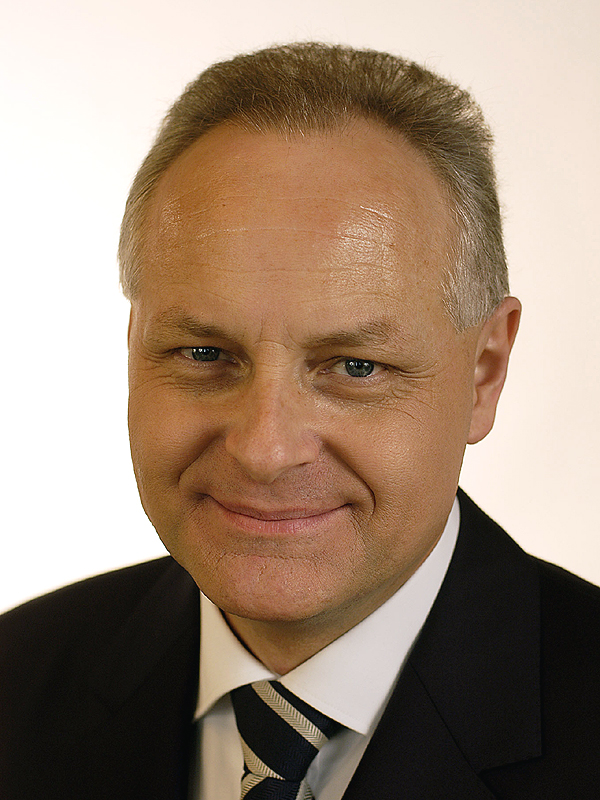
Rudolf Joder

Rudolf Joder (born 10 June 1950 in Zimmerwald) is a Swiss politician. He was a member of the Swiss National Council representing the canton of Bern from 1999 to 2015 and the president of the Bernese branch of the Swiss People's Party.

Joder served on the Grand Council of Bern from 1982 to 1998 and as mayor of Belp from 1989 to 2004. He was elected to the National Council in 1999. During his presidency of the cantonal party, to which he was elected in 2006, numerous leading office-holders left the People's Party to found the more liberal Conservative Democratic Party.

Rudolf Joder, an attorney by profession, is married and resident in Belp.
