= Zimmerwald =

- Former municipality
- Flag Coat of arms
- Location of Zimmerwald
- Location within Switzerland Location within Canton of Bern
- Coordinates: 46°53′N 7°28′E
- Country: Switzerland
- Canton: Bern
- District: Bern-Mittelland

Area
  - Total: 8.94 km^{2} (3.45 sq mi)
- Elevation: 840 m (2,760 ft)

Population (December 2002)
  - Total: 870
  - Density: 97/km^{2} (250/sq mi)
- Time zone: UTC+01:00 (CET)
  - Summer (DST): UTC+02:00 (CEST)
- Postal code: 3086
- SFOS number: 887
- ISO 3166 code: CH-BE
- Website

Zimmerwald (Swiss Standard German pronunciation: [ˈtsɪmərˌvald]) was an independent municipality in the Canton of Bern, Switzerland until 31 December 2003. It is located on a hill in the proximity of the city of Bern in the Bernese Mittelland. On 1 January 2004 Zimmerwald united with the municipality of Englisberg to form the new municipality of Wald.

On 31 December 2002 the population was 870. The coat of arms is three fir trees on three green mountain peaks with a background that ranges from silver to green.

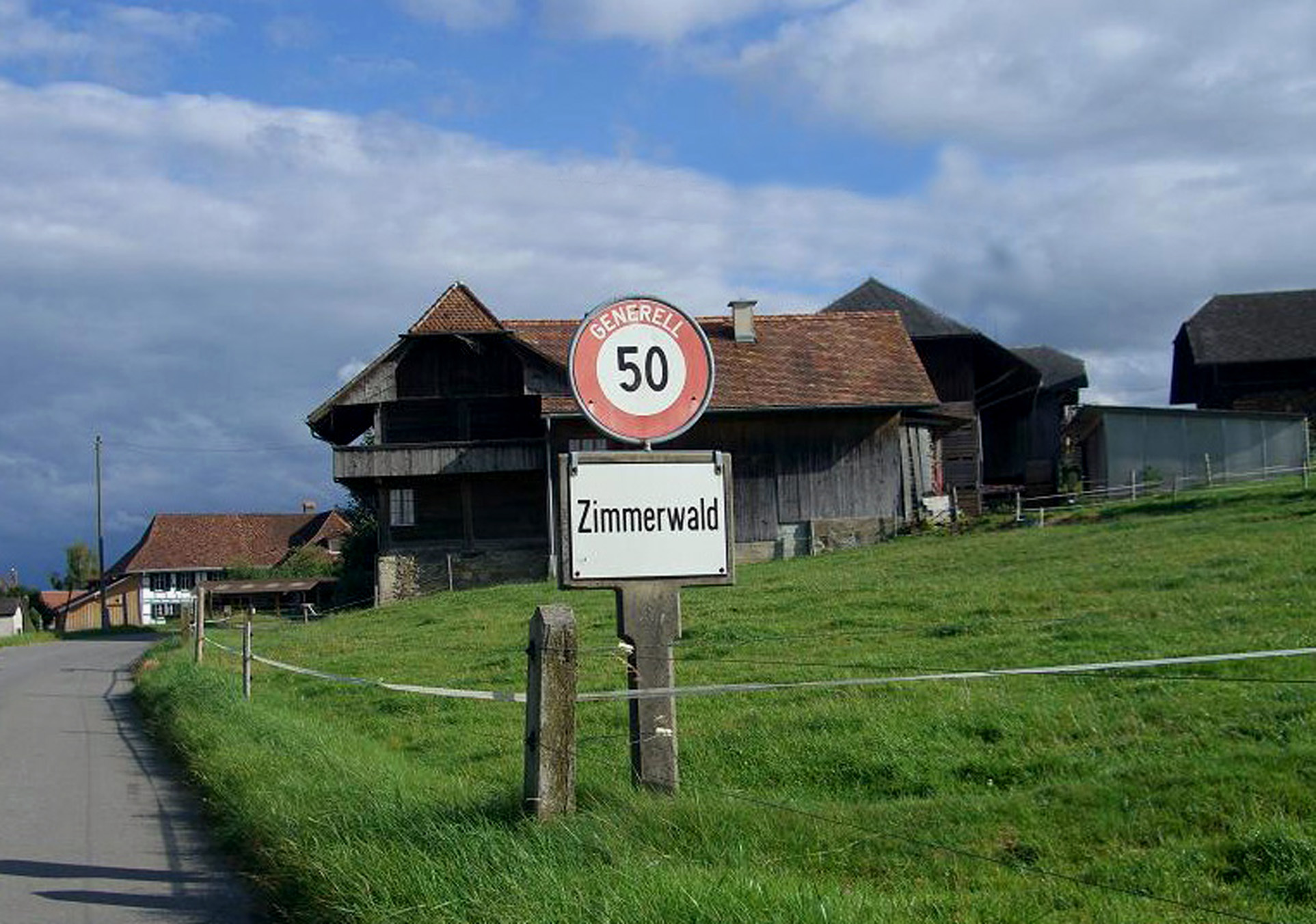
Village entrance of Zimmerwald

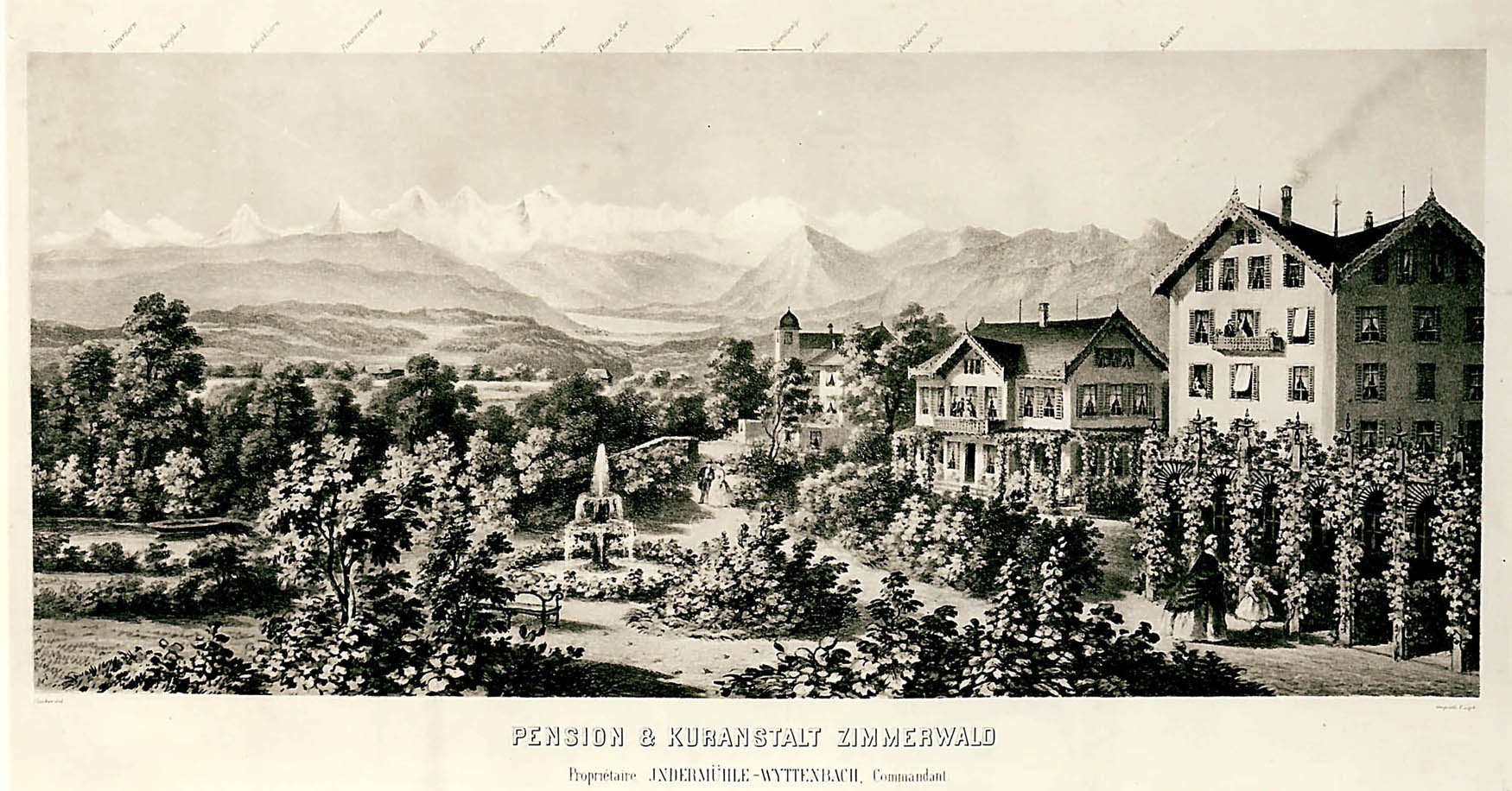
Hotel and Pension de Beau Séjour of Zimmerwald, steel engraving dated 1865

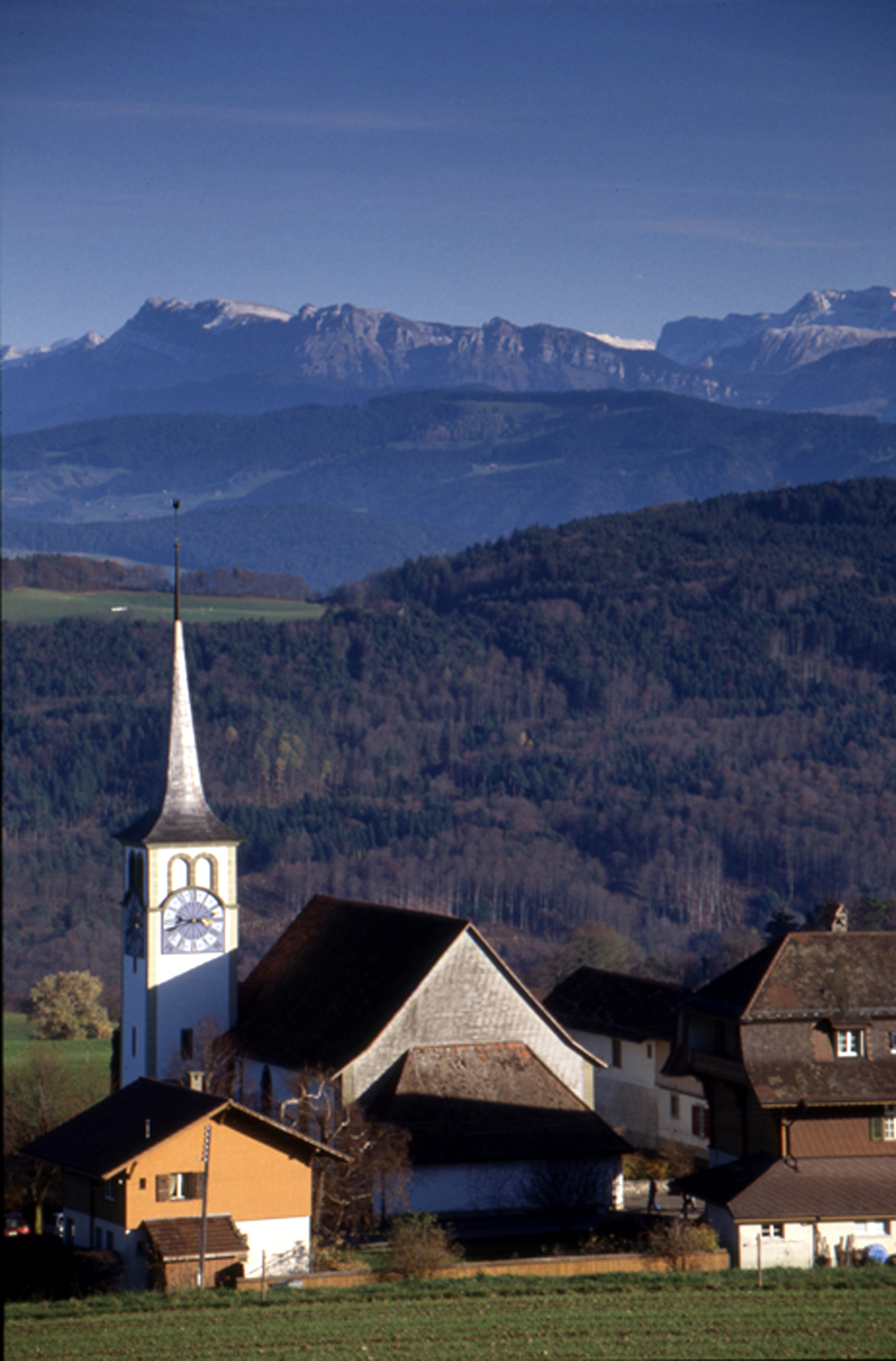
Church of Zimmerwald, view towards Belpberg and Alps

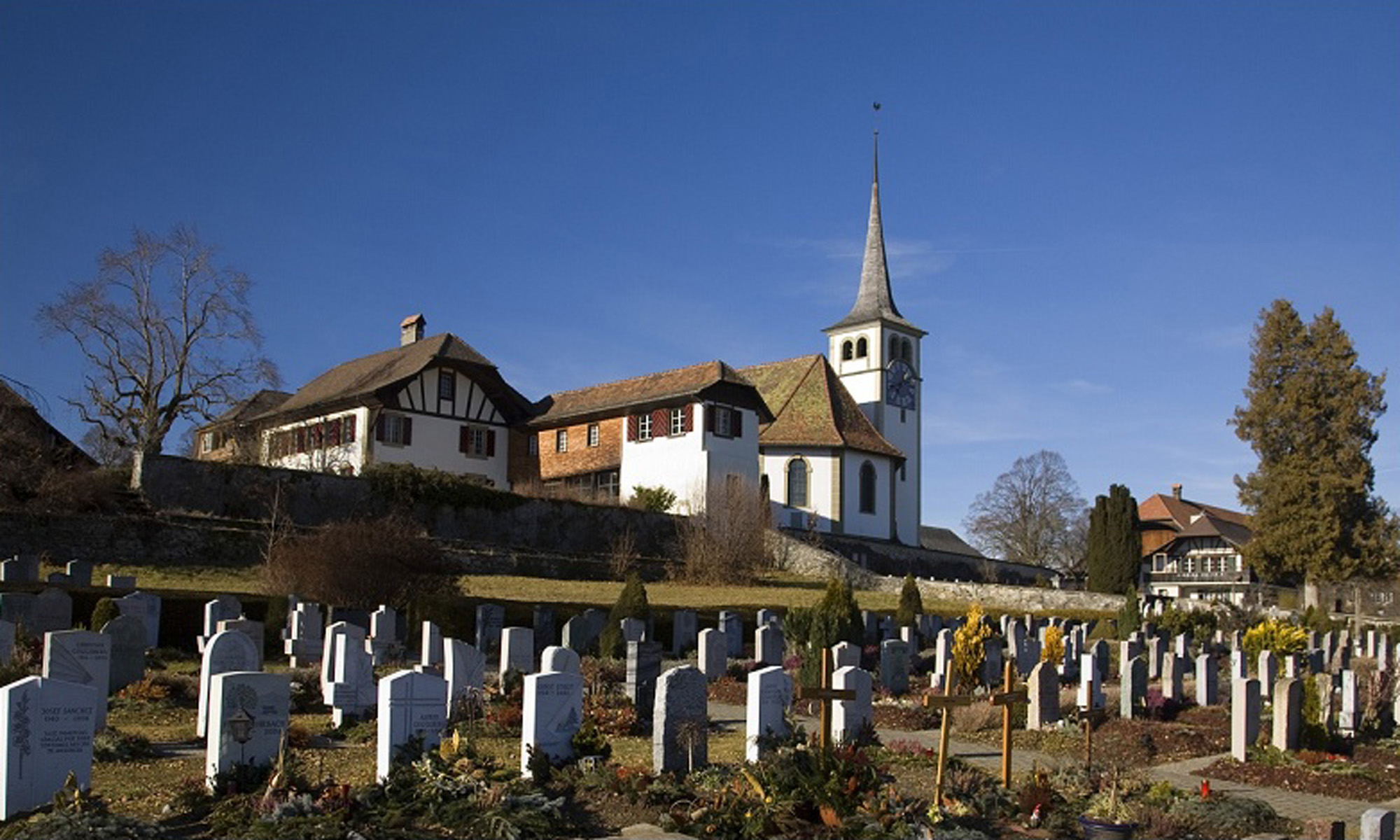
Church of Zimmerwald with adjoining municipal cemetery

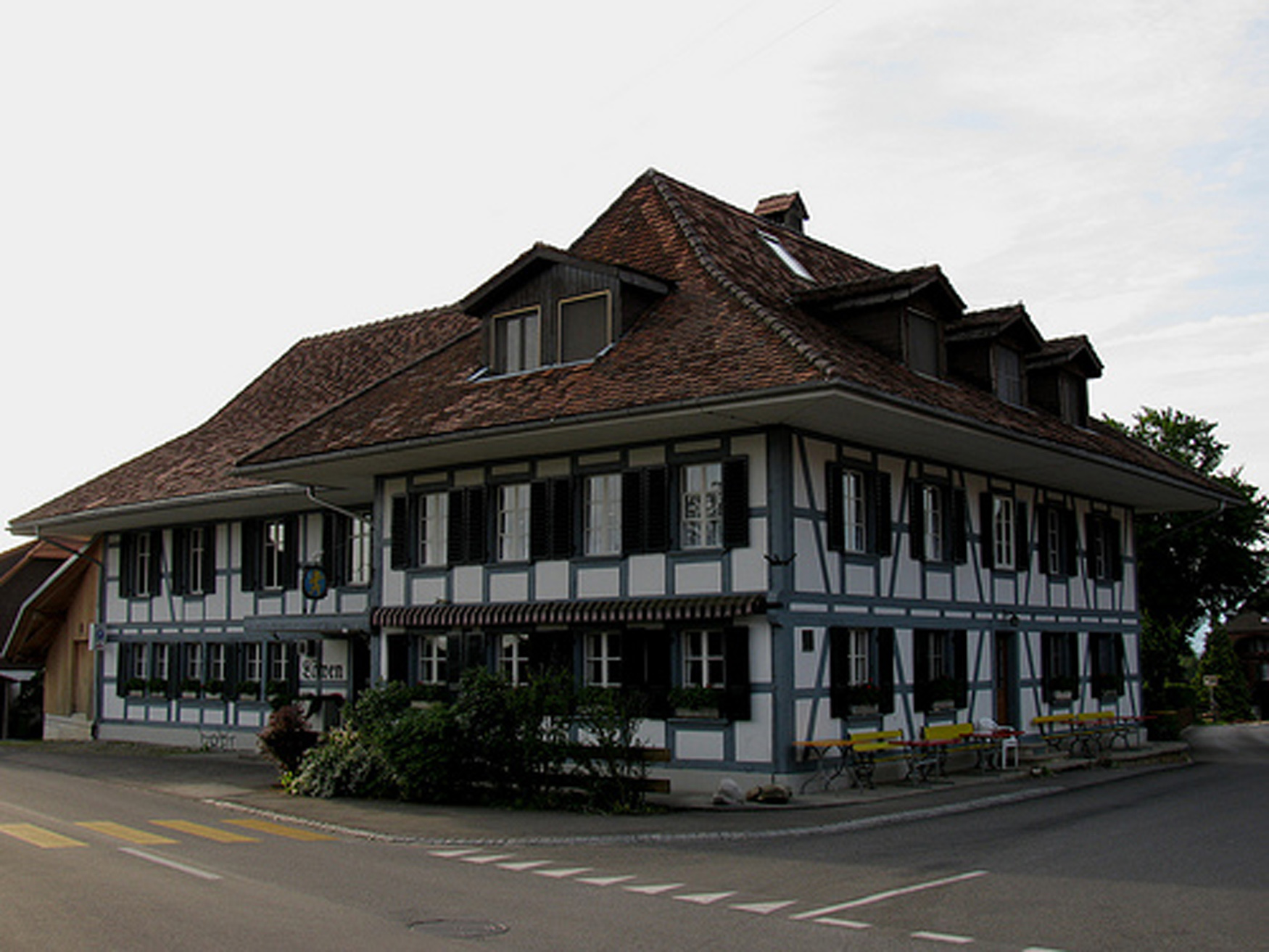
The "Leuen", the local tavern and inn of Zimmerwald, built in 1840

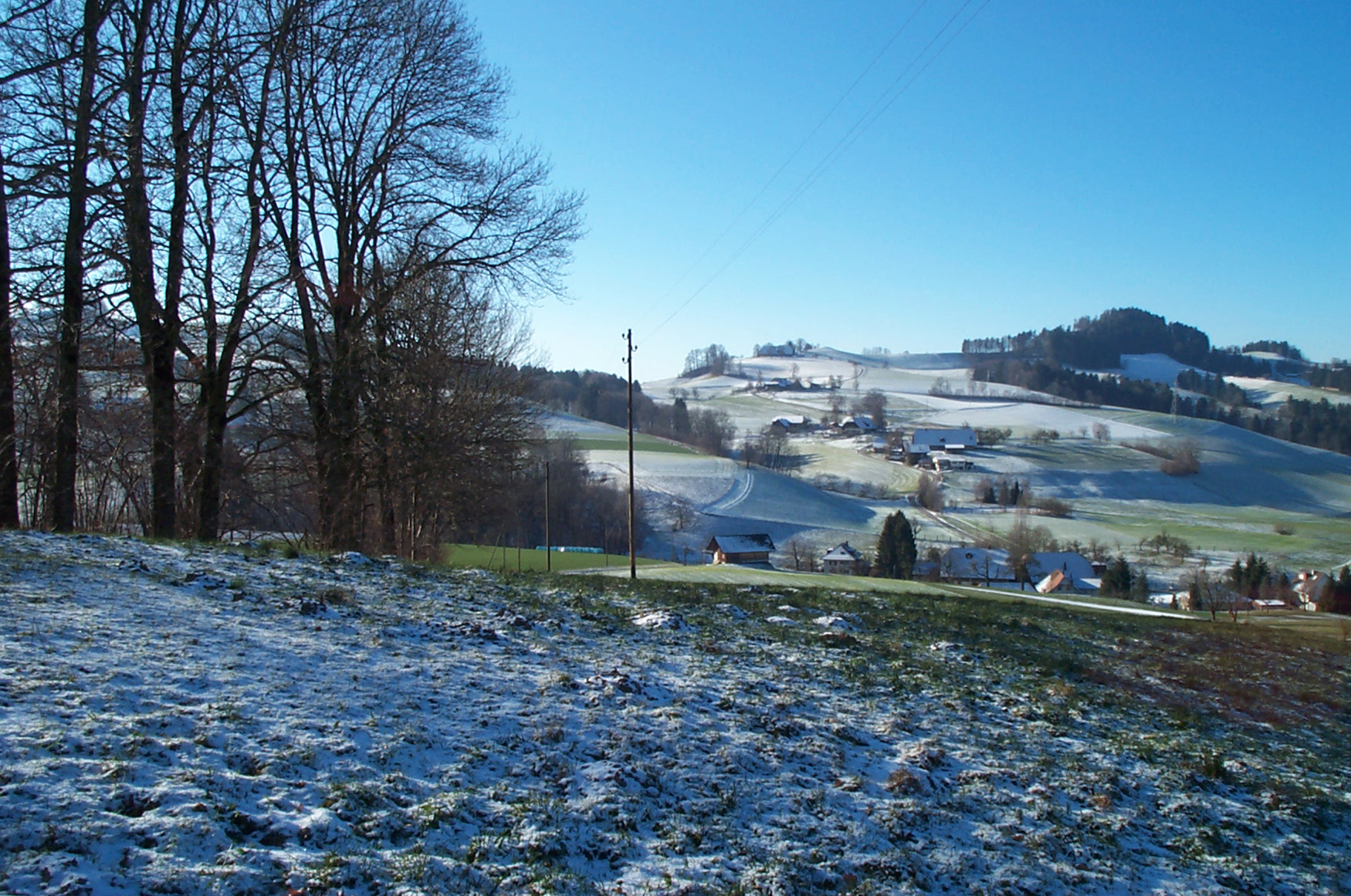
Hamlet of Brönni, Obermuhlern, village of Zimmerwald

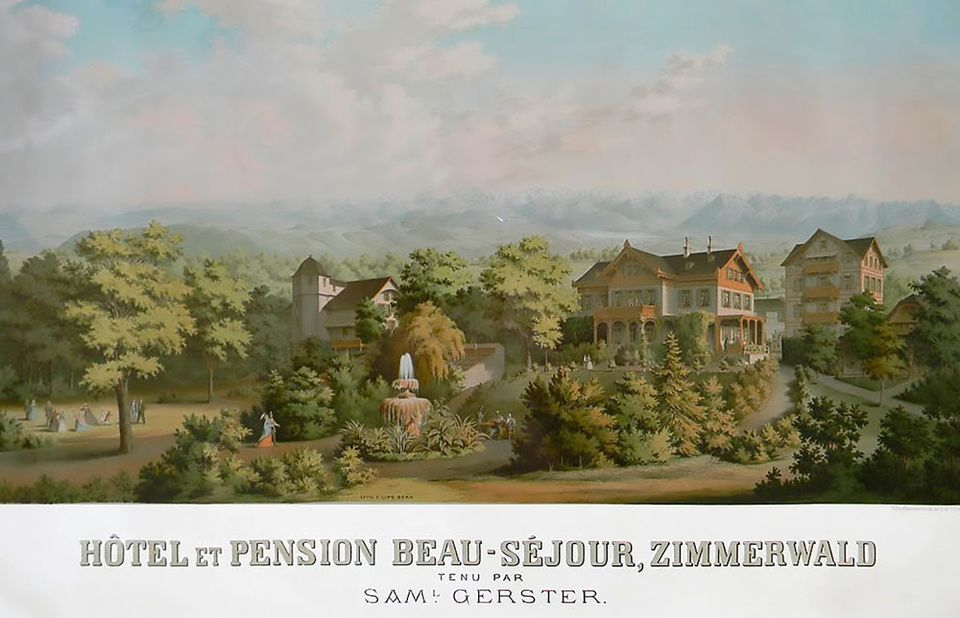
Coloured lithography of the Hotel "Beau Séjour" where delegates of the 1915 Zimmerwald Conference lived. The main building of the hotel was torn down in the 1960s. The guest house and parts of the park survive to this day

== History ==
Aerial view from northwest (1952)

Zimmerwald was only settled in the late phase of the Germanic colonisation of Switzerland. Between 800 and 900, Ciberni entering Southern Germany first settled on the Längenberg (Long Mountain), the hill on which Zimmerwald lies. The town is first mentioned in documents in the later Middle Ages. In 1999, Zimmerwald celebrated its 700th anniversary.

Zimmerwald is remembered in world history for the Zimmerwald Conference held in September 1915. Prominent socialists met from across Europe, among them Leon Trotsky and Vladimir Lenin. The conference was called by Robert Grimm of Bern. The international workers' movement split as a result of the conference into a social democratic and a revolutionary wing.

== Sites of interest ==
=== Wind instruments museum ===
The collection of the Zimmerwald wind instruments museum covers some 1,000 wind instruments from all periods, as well as percussion instruments. They include rare pieces such as bull horns, old Germanic lures, serpents and flap trumpets, but also Swiss alphorns.

=== Zimmerwald Observatory ===
The Zimmerwald Observatory is the reference point for the CH1903+ Swiss coordinate system.

== Prominent citizens and residents ==
- Gunvor Guggisberg (1974), Swiss entertainer
- Bruno Messerli (1931), geographer
- Hans Rudolf Streit (1910–1982), Swiss federal official
- Katrin Streit-Eggimann, Swiss politician
- Judith Wyder (1988), athlete
