= Schwarzwasserbrücke railway station =

Railway station in Schwarzenburg, Switzerland

Schwarzwasserbrücke
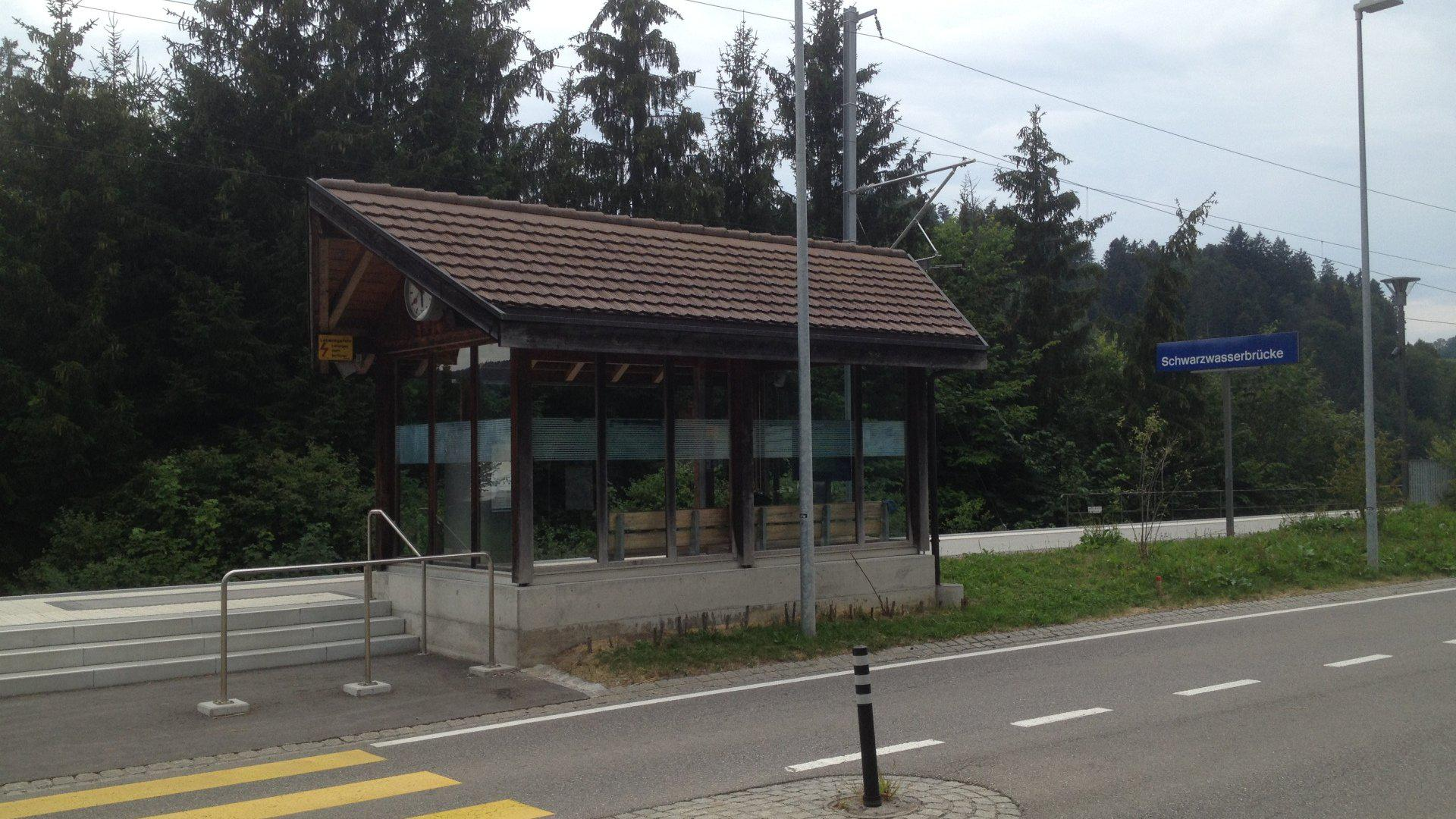
- The station platform in 2018

General information
- Location: Schwarzenburg; Switzerland
- Coordinates: 46°51′47″N 7°21′43″E
- Elevation: 645 m (2,116 ft)
- Owner: BLS AG
- Line: Bern–Schwarzenburg line
- Distance: 14.7 km (9.1 mi) from Bern
- Platforms: 1 side platform
- Tracks: 1
- Train operators: BLS AG

Construction
- Accessible: Yes

Other information
- Station code: 8507095 (SBR)
- Fare zone: 126 (Libero)

Passengers
- 2023: 130 per weekday (BLS)

Services
Preceding station	Bern S-Bahn	Following station
Lanzenhäusern towards Schwarzenburg	S6	Mittelhäusern towards Bern
Location

Schwarzwasserbrücke railway station (German: Bahnhof Schwarzwasserbrücke) is a railway station in the municipality of Schwarzenburg, in the Swiss canton of Bern. It is an intermediate stop on the standard gauge Bern–Schwarzenburg line of BLS AG. The station takes its name from the nearby Schwarzwasserbrücke over the Schwarzwasser, a tributary of the river Sense.

== Services ==
As of the December 2024 timetable change, the following services stop at Schwarzwasserbrücke:

- Bern S-Bahn S6: half-hourly service between Bern and Schwarzenburg.
