= Niederscherli railway station =

Railway station in Köniz, Switzerland

Niederscherli
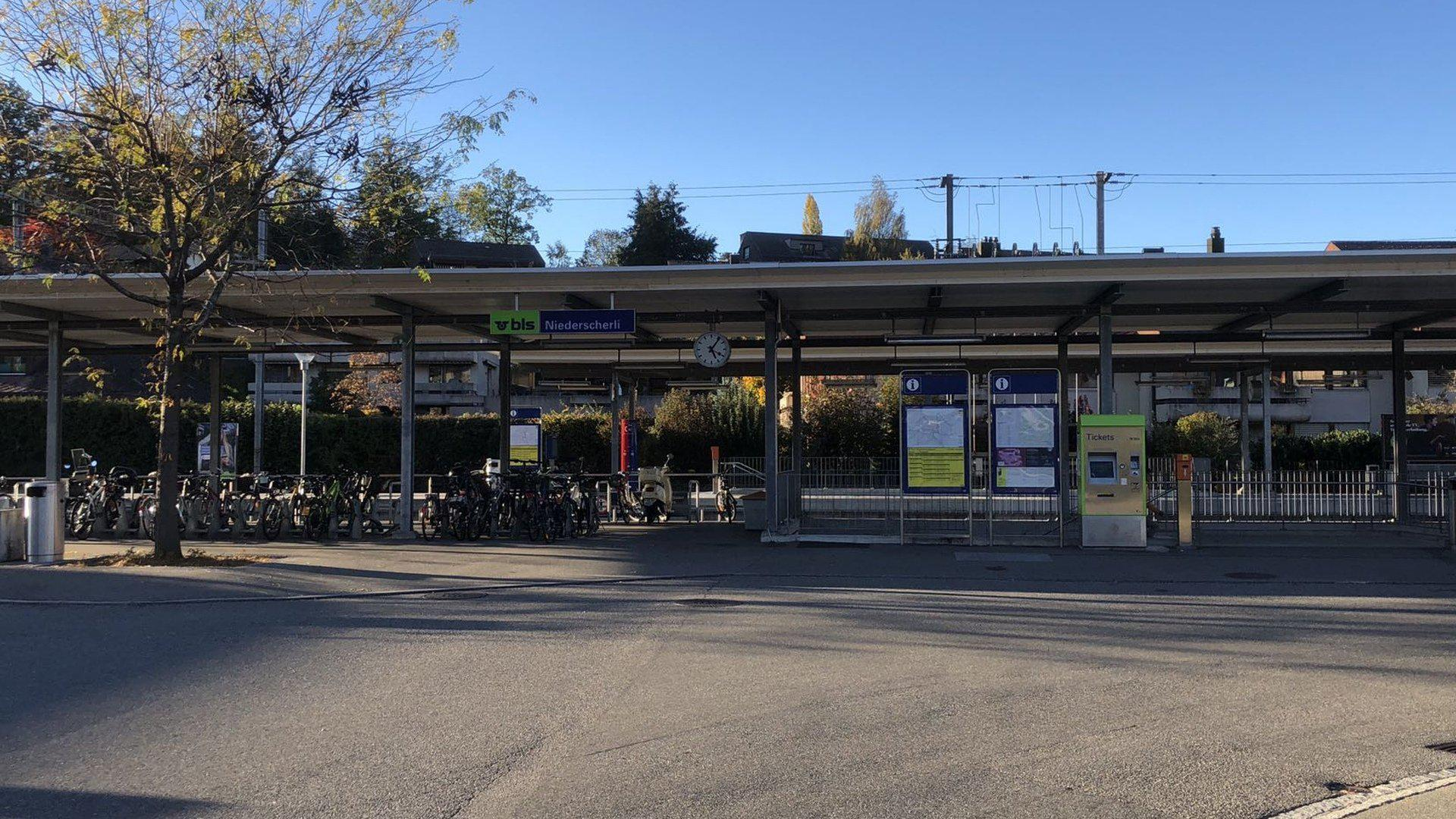
- The station platform in 2018

General information
- Location: Köniz; Switzerland
- Coordinates: 46°53′10″N 7°23′17″E
- Elevation: 656 m (2,152 ft)
- Owner: BLS AG
- Line: Bern–Schwarzenburg line
- Distance: 10.9 km (6.8 mi) from Bern
- Platforms: 2 (1 island platform)
- Tracks: 3
- Train operators: BLS AG
- Connections: PostAuto AG bus line

Construction
- Accessible: Yes

Other information
- Station code: 8507086 (NS)
- Fare zone: 116 (Libero)

Passengers
- 2023: 1'000 per weekday (BLS)

Services
Preceding station	Bern S-Bahn	Following station
Mittelhäusern towards Schwarzenburg	S6	Gasel towards Bern
Location

Niederscherli railway station (German: Bahnhof Niederscherli) is a railway station in the municipality of Köniz, in the Swiss canton of Bern. It is an intermediate stop on the standard gauge Bern–Schwarzenburg line of BLS AG.

== Services ==
As of the December 2024 timetable change, the following services stop at Niederscherli:

- Bern S-Bahn S6: half-hourly service between Bern and Schwarzenburg.
