= Liebefeld railway station =

Railway station in Köniz, Switzerland

Liebefeld
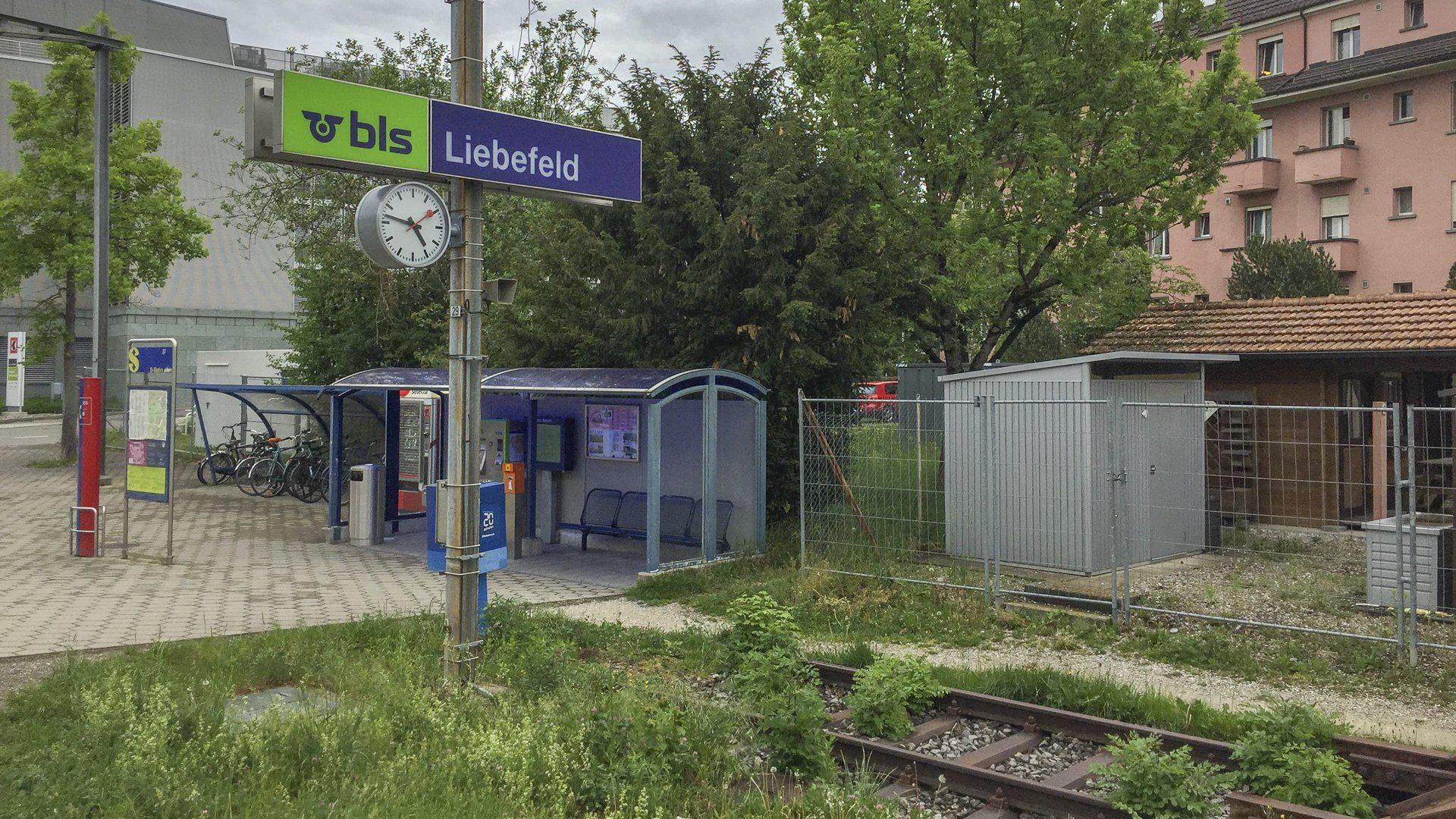
- The station platform in 2018

General information
- Location: Köniz; Switzerland
- Coordinates: 46°55′48″N 7°25′08″E
- Elevation: 563 m (1,847 ft)
- Owner: BLS AG
- Line: Bern–Schwarzenburg line
- Distance: 5.0 km (3.1 mi) from Bern
- Platforms: 1 side platform
- Tracks: 1
- Train operators: BLS AG

Construction
- Accessible: Partly

Other information
- Station code: 8507091 (LBF)
- Fare zone: 101 (Libero)

Passengers
- 2023: 1'000 per weekday (BLS)

Services
Preceding station	Bern S-Bahn	Following station
Köniz towards Schwarzenburg	S6	Bern Europaplatz towards Bern
Location

Liebefeld railway station (German: Bahnhof Liebefeld) is a railway station in the municipality of Köniz, in the Swiss canton of Bern. It is an intermediate stop on the standard gauge Bern–Schwarzenburg line of BLS AG.

== Services ==
As of the December 2024 timetable change, the following services stop at Liebefeld:

- Bern S-Bahn S6: half-hourly service between Bern and Schwarzenburg.
