= Lanzenhäusern railway station =

Railway station in Schwarzenburg, Switzerland

Lanzenhäusern
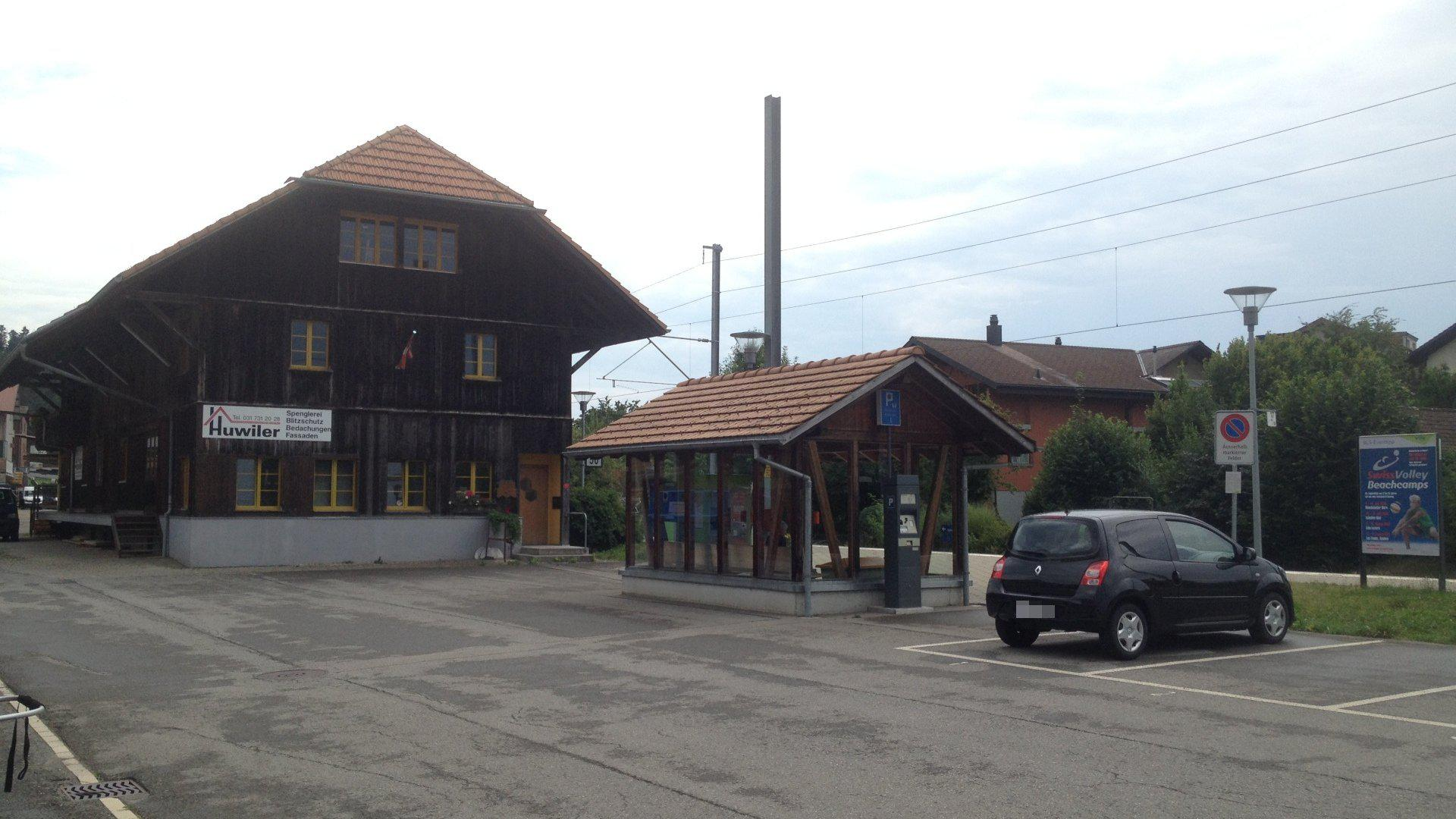
- The station platform in 2018

General information
- Location: Schwarzenburg; Switzerland
- Coordinates: 46°50′31″N 7°20′49″E
- Elevation: 741 m (2,431 ft)
- Owner: BLS AG
- Line: Bern–Schwarzenburg line
- Distance: 17.8 km (11.1 mi) from Bern
- Platforms: 1 side platform
- Tracks: 1
- Train operators: BLS AG

Construction
- Parking: Yes (11 spaces)
- Accessible: Yes

Other information
- Station code: 8507088 (LH)
- Fare zone: 126 (Libero)

Passengers
- 2023: 320 per weekday (BLS)

Services
Preceding station	Bern S-Bahn	Following station
Schwarzenburg Terminus	S6	Schwarzwasserbrücke towards Bern
Location

Lanzenhäusern railway station (German: Bahnhof Lanzenhäusern) is a railway station in the municipality of Schwarzenburg, in the Swiss canton of Bern. It is an intermediate stop on the standard gauge Bern–Schwarzenburg line of BLS AG.

== Services ==
As of the December 2024 timetable change, the following services stop at Lanzenhäusern:

- Bern S-Bahn S6: half-hourly service between Bern and Schwarzenburg.
