= Mittelhäusern railway station =

Railway station in Köniz, Switzerland

Mittelhäusern
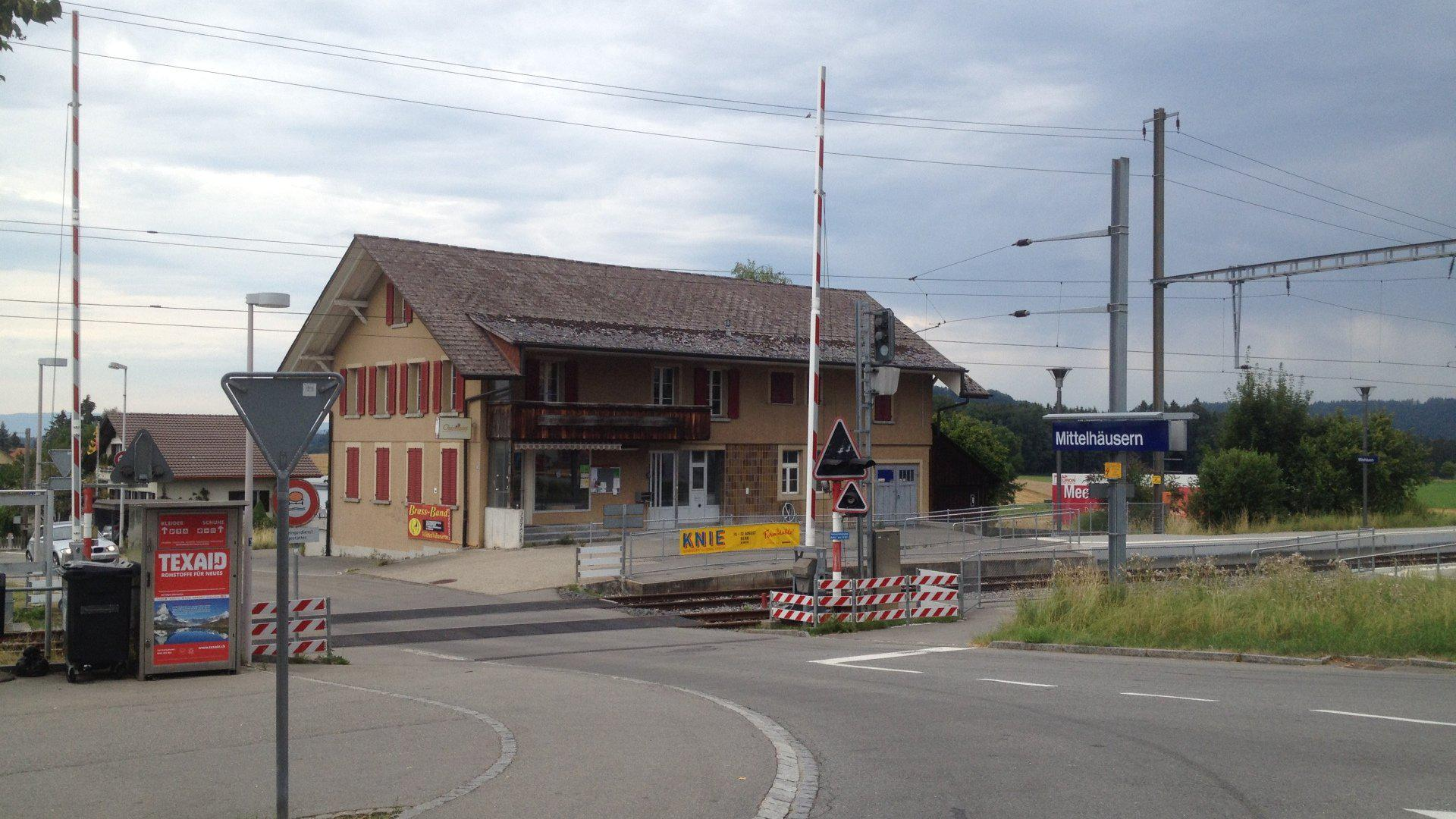
- The station platforms in 2018

General information
- Location: Köniz; Switzerland
- Coordinates: 46°52′37″N 7°22′05″E
- Elevation: 669 m (2,195 ft)
- Owner: BLS AG
- Line: Bern–Schwarzenburg line
- Distance: 12.9 km (8.0 mi) from Bern
- Platforms: 2 side platforms
- Tracks: 2
- Train operators: BLS AG

Construction
- Accessible: Yes

Other information
- Station code: 8507087 (MHN)
- Fare zone: 116 (Libero)

Passengers
- 2023: 560 per weekday (BLS)

Services
| Preceding station | Bern S-Bahn | Following station |
|---|---|---|
| Schwarzwasserbrücke towards Schwarzenburg | S6 | Niederscherli towards Bern |
Location

Mittelhäusern railway station (German: Bahnhof Mittelhäusern) is a railway station in the municipality of Köniz, in the Swiss canton of Bern. It is an intermediate stop on the standard gauge Bern–Schwarzenburg line of BLS AG.

== Services ==
As of the December 2024 timetable change, the following services stop at Mittelhäusern:

- Bern S-Bahn: S6: half-hourly service between Bern and Schwarzenburg.
