= Moos railway station =

Railway station in Köniz, Switzerland

Moos
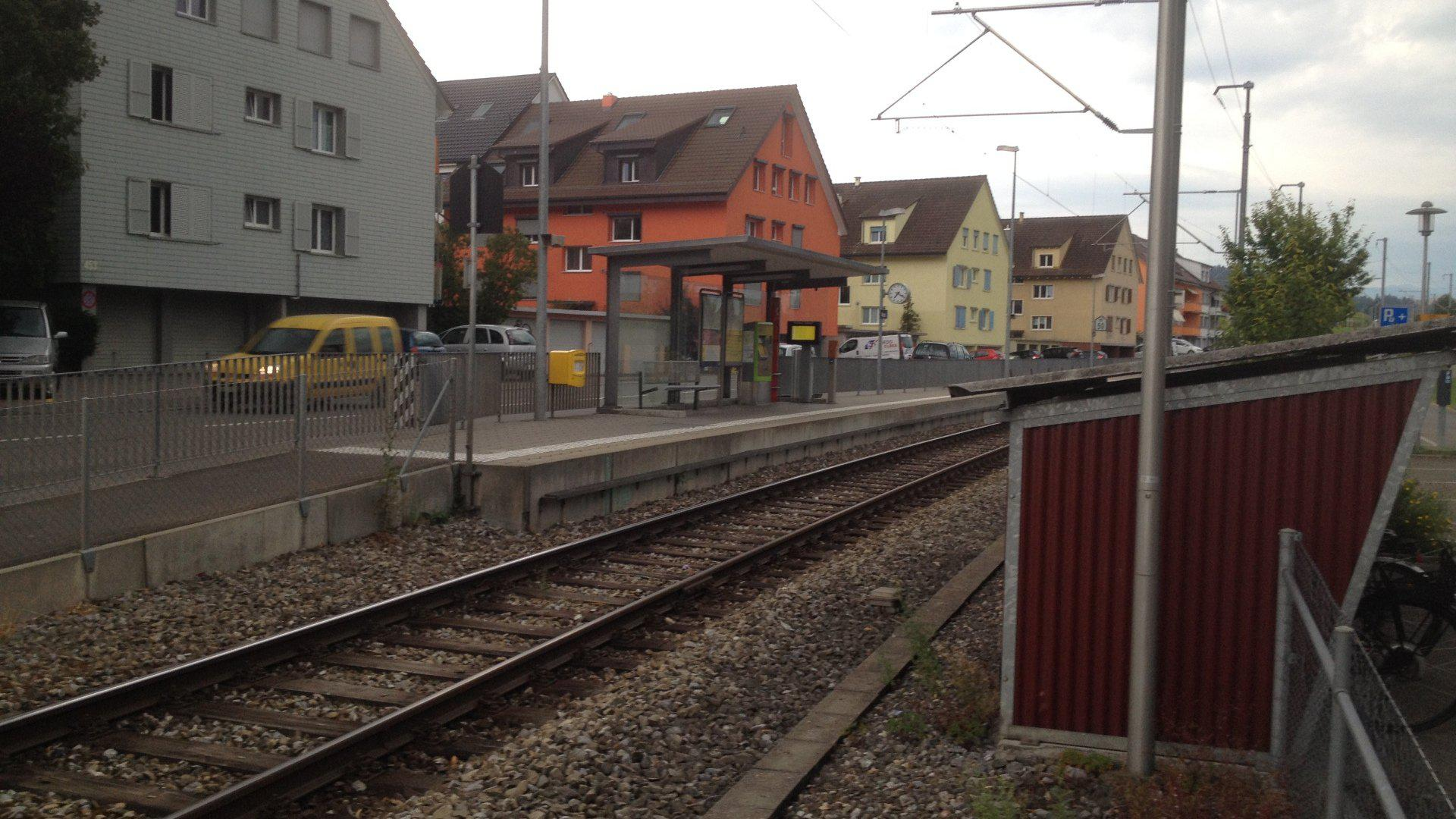
- The station platform in 2018

General information
- Location: Köniz; Switzerland
- Coordinates: 46°54′36″N 7°24′04″E
- Elevation: 628 m (2,060 ft)
- Owner: BLS AG
- Line: Bern–Schwarzenburg line
- Distance: 7.8 km (4.8 mi) from Bern
- Platforms: 1 side platform
- Tracks: 1
- Train operators: BLS AG

Construction
- Parking: Yes (8 spaces)
- Accessible: Partly

Other information
- Station code: 8507084 (MOOS)
- Fare zone: 101 (Libero)

Passengers
- 2023: 280 per weekday (BLS)

Services
Preceding station	Bern S-Bahn	Following station
Gasel towards Schwarzenburg	S6	Köniz towards Bern
Location

Moos railway station (German: Bahnhof Moos) is a railway station in the municipality of Köniz, in the Swiss canton of Bern. It is an intermediate stop on the standard gauge Bern–Schwarzenburg line of BLS AG.

== Services ==
As of the December 2024 timetable change, the following services stop at Moos:

- Bern S-Bahn: S6: half-hourly service between Bern and Schwarzenburg.
