= Köniz railway station =

Railway station in Köniz, Switzerland

Köniz
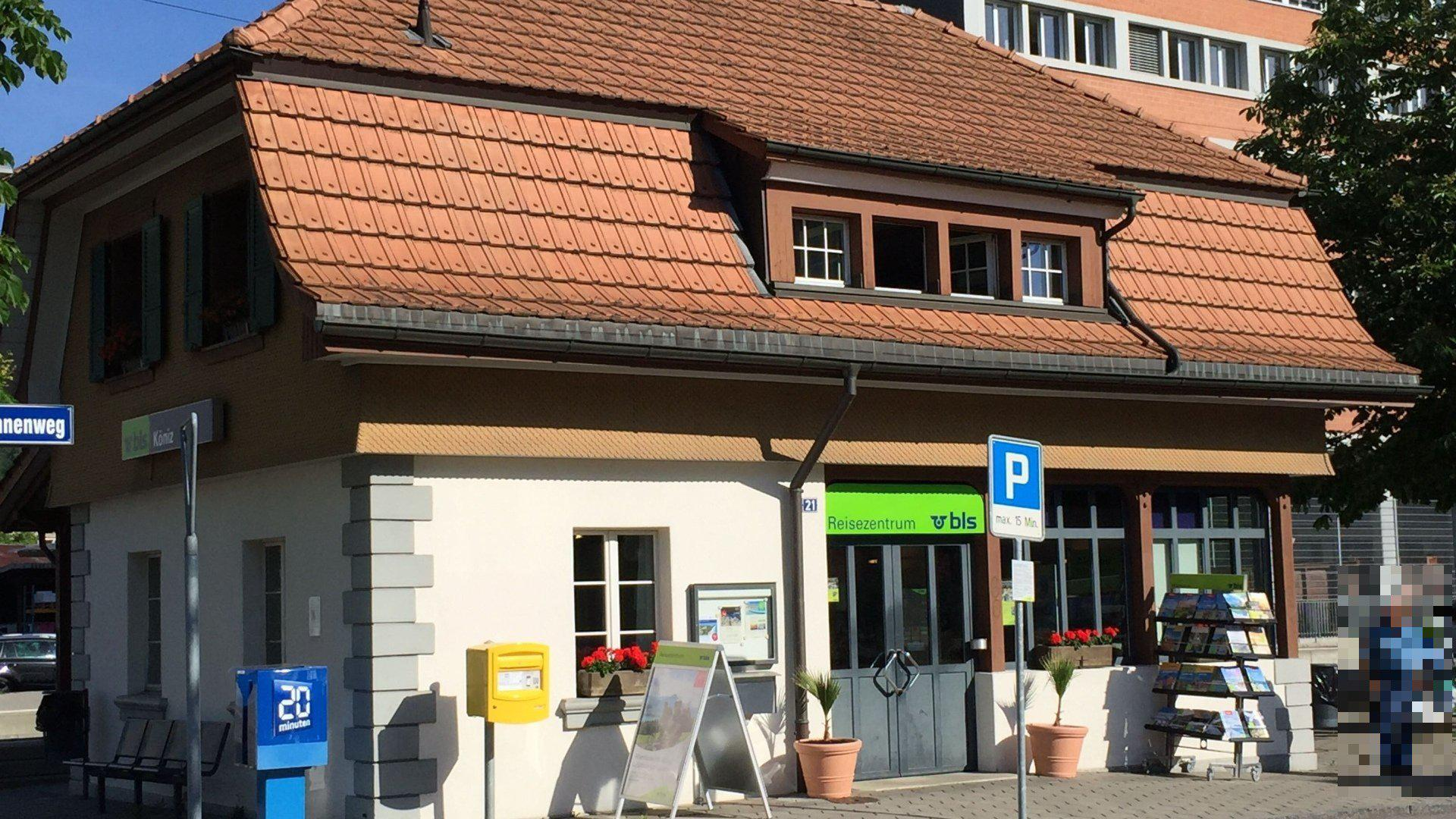
- The station building in 2018

General information
- Location: Köniz; Switzerland
- Coordinates: 46°55′30″N 7°24′54″E
- Elevation: 572 m (1,877 ft)
- Owner: BLS AG
- Line: Bern–Schwarzenburg line
- Distance: 5.7 km (3.5 mi) from Bern
- Platforms: 2 side platforms
- Tracks: 2
- Train operators: BLS AG
- Connections: BERNMOBIL buses; PostAuto AG bus line

Construction
- Accessible: Yes

Other information
- Station code: 8507083 (KOE)
- Fare zone: 101 (Libero)

Passengers
- 2023: 1'800 per weekday (BLS)

Services
Preceding station	Bern S-Bahn	Following station
Moos towards Schwarzenburg	S6	Liebefeld towards Bern
Location

Köniz railway station (German: Bahnhof Köniz) is a railway station in the municipality of Köniz, in the Swiss canton of Bern. It is an intermediate stop on the standard gauge Bern–Schwarzenburg line of BLS AG.

== Services ==
As of the December 2024 timetable change, the following services stop at Köniz:

- Bern S-Bahn: S6: half-hourly service between Bern and Schwarzenburg.
