= Gasel railway station =

Railway station in Köniz, Switzerland

Gasel
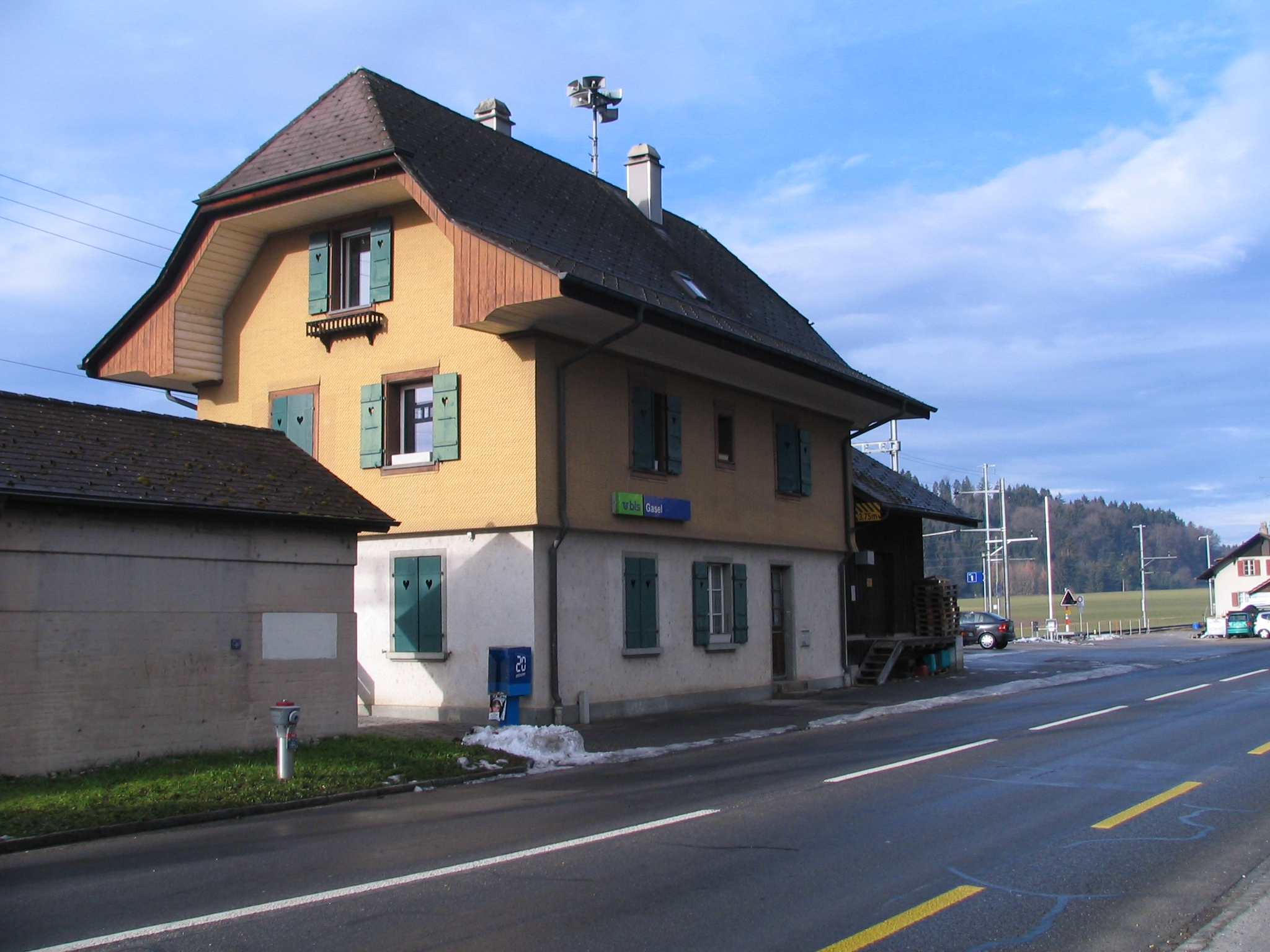
- The station building in 2013

General information
- Location: Köniz; Switzerland
- Coordinates: 46°54′04″N 7°24′04″E
- Elevation: 650 m (2,130 ft)
- Owner: BLS AG
- Line: Bern–Schwarzenburg line
- Distance: 8.9 km (5.5 mi) from Bern
- Platforms: 2 side platforms
- Tracks: 2
- Train operators: BLS AG

Construction
- Parking: Yes (13 spaces)
- Accessible: Yes

Other information
- Station code: 8507085 (GAS)
- Fare zone: 101 (Libero)

Passengers
- 2023: 410 per weekday (BLS)

Services
Preceding station	Bern S-Bahn	Following station
Niederscherli towards Schwarzenburg	S6	Moos towards Bern
Location

Gasel railway station (German: Bahnhof Gasel) is a railway station in the municipality of Köniz, in the Swiss canton of Bern. It is an intermediate stop on the standard gauge Bern–Schwarzenburg line of BLS AG.

== Services ==
As of the December 2024 timetable change, the following services stop at Gasel:

- Bern S-Bahn S6: half-hourly service between Bern and Schwarzenburg.
