= Köniz =

- Municipality
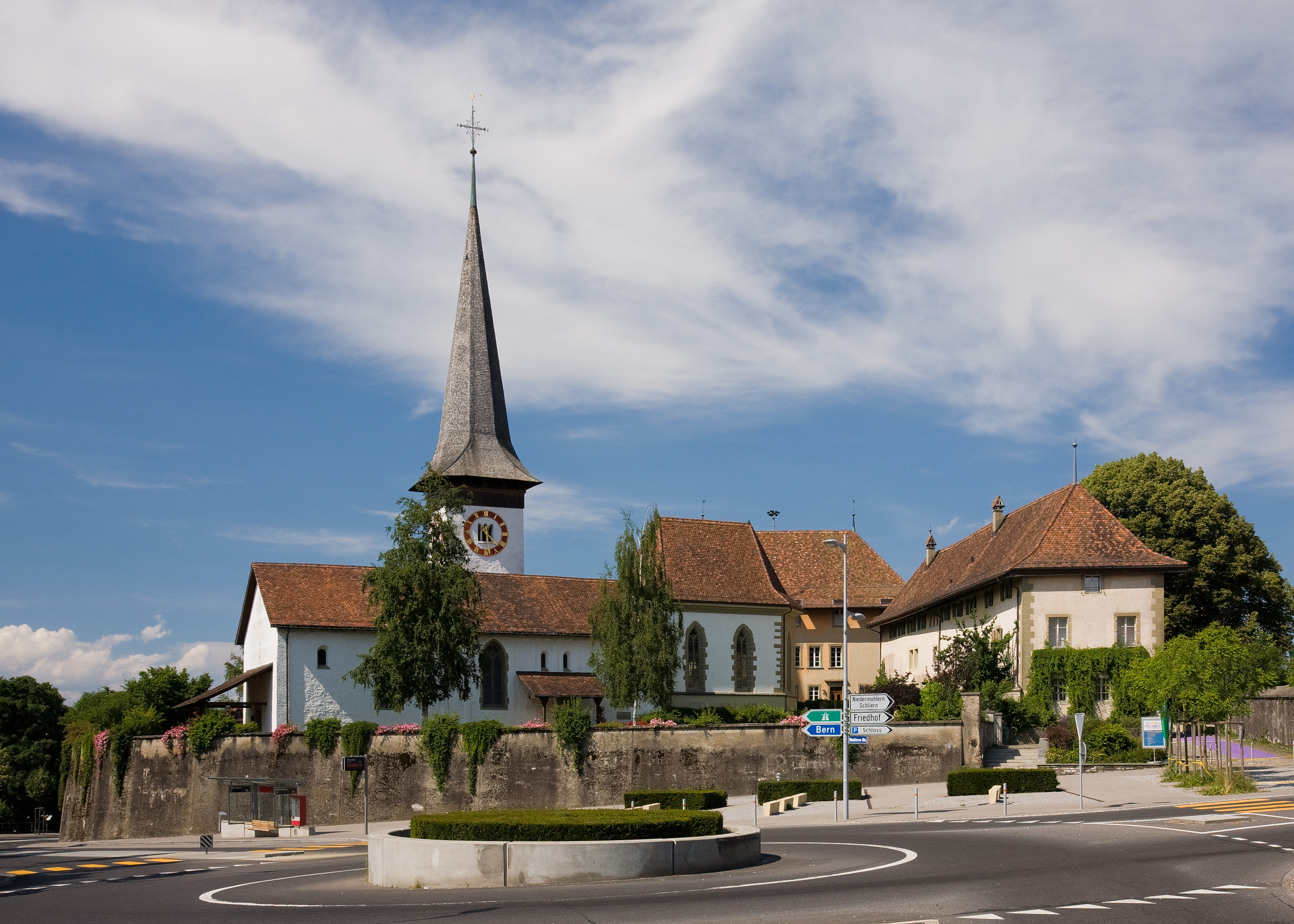

- Flag Coat of arms
- Location of Köniz
- Location within Switzerland Location within Canton of Bern
- Coordinates: 46°56′N 7°24′E
- Country: Switzerland
- Canton: Bern
- District: Bern-Mittelland

Government
  - Executive: Gemeinderat with 5 members
  - Mayor: Gemeindepräsident (list); Tanja Bauer SPS/PSS (as of 2026)
  - Parliament: Gemeindeparlament with 40 members

Area
  - Total: 51.2 km^{2} (19.8 sq mi)
- Elevation: 572 m (1,877 ft)

Population (December 2020)
  - Total: 42,388
  - Density: 828/km^{2} (2,140/sq mi)
- Time zone: UTC+01:00 (CET)
  - Summer (DST): UTC+02:00 (CEST)
- Postal code: 3098
- SFOS number: 355
- ISO 3166 code: CH-BE
- Localities: Köniz, Gasel, Halen, Herzwil, Liebefeld, Liebewil, Mengestorf, Mittelhäusern, Moos, Niederscherli, Niederwangen, Oberried, Oberscherli, Oberwangen, Ried, Schlatt, Schliern, Schwanden, Spiegel, Thörishaus, Ulmiz, Wabern
- Surrounded by: Bern, Kehrsatz, Muri bei Bern, Neuenegg, Oberbalm, Ueberstorf (FR), Wahlern, Wald
- Twin towns: Blatten (Switzerland), Prijepolje (Serbia)
- Website: www.koeniz.ch

Köniz (Swiss Standard German: [ˈkøːnɪts], Alemannic German: [ˈχʏnɪts]) is a town and a municipality in the Bern-Mittelland administrative district right on the southern border to Bern in the canton of Bern in Switzerland. The municipality of Köniz as a single settlement would belong to the 15 most populous towns in Switzerland. It is also part of the larger agglomeration of Bern of about 400,000 inhabitants.

== History ==
Aerial view from 800 m by Walter Mittelholzer (1922)

The current municipality has long been inhabited; there have been a number of Bronze- and Iron Age finds, as well as Roman villas (villae rusticae) and Early Middle Ages graveyards. The oldest parts of the current reformed parish church (formerly SS. Peter and Paul) date back to around 1100. There may have been other previous buildings on this site, but archaeological digs have uncovered no evidence of them thus far. Köniz is first mentioned in 1011 as Chunicis.

According to legend the church was founded by Burgundian King Rudolph II and his wife Bertha. The parish did not only comprise the current municipality, but also the area around present day Bern, around 5 km away. In 1191 it became the parish church of the newly founded town, until it was given the status of its own parish in 1276.

There was an Augustinian monastery at the church, which was given to the Teutonic Knights by King Henry VII, the son and heir to the Holy Roman Emperor Frederick II, in 1226. The order established a commendam at the church, which belonged to the bailiwick (German: Ballei) of Schwaben-Elsass-Burgund, as well as a settlement in Bern. One of the friars was installed as parish priest. With the growth of the parish of Bern, the settlement there was raised to commendam status, whose principle was the parish priest in Bern.

The Köniz commendam was secularised in 1528 during the Bernese Reformation, but was given back to the Order in 1552 after pressure from the Catholic Cantons. In 1729 the Order sold the commendam to Bern. A bailiwick was established, which existed until the collapse of the old Bern in 1798. The municipality of Köniz in its present form, came into being in 1846.

== Geography ==
Köniz has an area of 51.01 km^{2} (19.70 sq mi). Of this area, 25.78 km^{2} (9.95 mi^{2}) or 50.5% is used for agricultural purposes, while 15.73 km^{2} (6.07 mi^{2}) or 30.8% is forested. Of the rest of the land, 9.39 km^{2} (3.63 mi^{2}) or 18.4% is settled (buildings or roads), 0.17 km^{2} (0.066 mi^{2}) or 0.3% is either rivers or lakes and 0.01 km^{2} (2.5 acres) or 0.0% is unproductive land.

Of the built up area, industrial buildings made up 1.2% of the total area while housing and buildings made up 10.7% and transportation infrastructure made up 4.8%. while parks, green belts and sports fields made up 1.1%. Out of the forested land, 29.5% of the total land area is heavily forested and 1.4% is covered with orchards or small clusters of trees. Of the agricultural land, 31.2% is used for growing crops and 18.0% is pastures, while 1.4% is used for orchards or vine crops. All the water in the municipality is flowing water.

The municipality is located in the agglomeration of Bern. It stretches from the river Aare in the north-east to the rivers Schwarzwasser and Sense in the southeast. It consists of the village of Köniz and Wabern in the center, the garden towns of Liebefeld am Könizberg and Spiegel am Gurten as well as a number of other settlements including; Niederwangen, Oberwangen and Thörishaus in the Wangen valley as well as Schliern, Schwanden, Niederscherli and Oberscherli, Mittelhäusern und Gasel in the Upper Municipality.

== Coat of arms ==
The blazon of the municipal coat of arms is Argent a Cross Sable.

== Demographics ==
Köniz has a population (as of December 2020) of 42,388. As of 2010, 15.5% of the population are resident foreign nationals. Over the last 10 years (2000–2010) the population has changed at a rate of 2.6%. Migration accounted for 3.4%, while births and deaths accounted for 0.6%.

Most of the population (as of 2000) speaks German (32,994 or 87.3%) as their first language, French is the second most common (1,023 or 2.7%) and Italian is the third (837 or 2.2%). There are 37 people who speak Romansh.

As of 2008, the population was 47.8% male and 52.2% female. The population was made up of 15,355 Swiss men (39.6% of the population) and 3,188 (8.2%) non-Swiss men. There were 17,440 Swiss women (44.9%) and 2,840 (7.3%) non-Swiss women. Of the population in the municipality, 8,939 or about 23.7% were born in Köniz and lived there in 2000. There were 14,483 or 38.3% who were born in the same canton, while 6,983 or 18.5% were born somewhere else in Switzerland, and 5,691 or 15.1% were born outside of Switzerland.

As of 2000, children and teenagers (0–19 years old) make up 20.8% of the population, while adults (20–64 years old) make up 61.8% and seniors (over 64 years old) make up 17.4%.

As of 2000, there were 15,582 people who were single and never married in the municipality. There were 17,687 married individuals, 2,306 widows or widowers and 2,207 individuals who are divorced.

As of 2000, there were 17,240 private households in the municipality, and an average of 2.1 persons per household. There were 6,657 households that consist of only one person and 700 households with five or more people. In 2000, a total of 16,917 apartments (92.4% of the total) were permanently occupied, while 1,096 apartments (6.0%) were seasonally occupied and 305 apartments (1.7%) were empty. As of 2009, the construction rate of new housing units was 4.7 new units per 1000 residents. The vacancy rate for the municipality, in 2010, was 0.75%.

The historical population is given in the following chart:

== Heritage sites of national significance ==
The farm house at Herzwilstrasse 175, the Roman Era farmhouse at Chly-Wabere, the former commandry with castle, church and outbuildings, the Herrenstock, Hof Burren at Mengestorfbergstrasse 191, 193, the noble's wooden house and Villa Morillon are listed as Swiss heritage sites of national significance. The hamlets of Gurtendörfli, Herzwil, Liebewil and Mengestorf are all part of the Inventory of Swiss Heritage Sites.

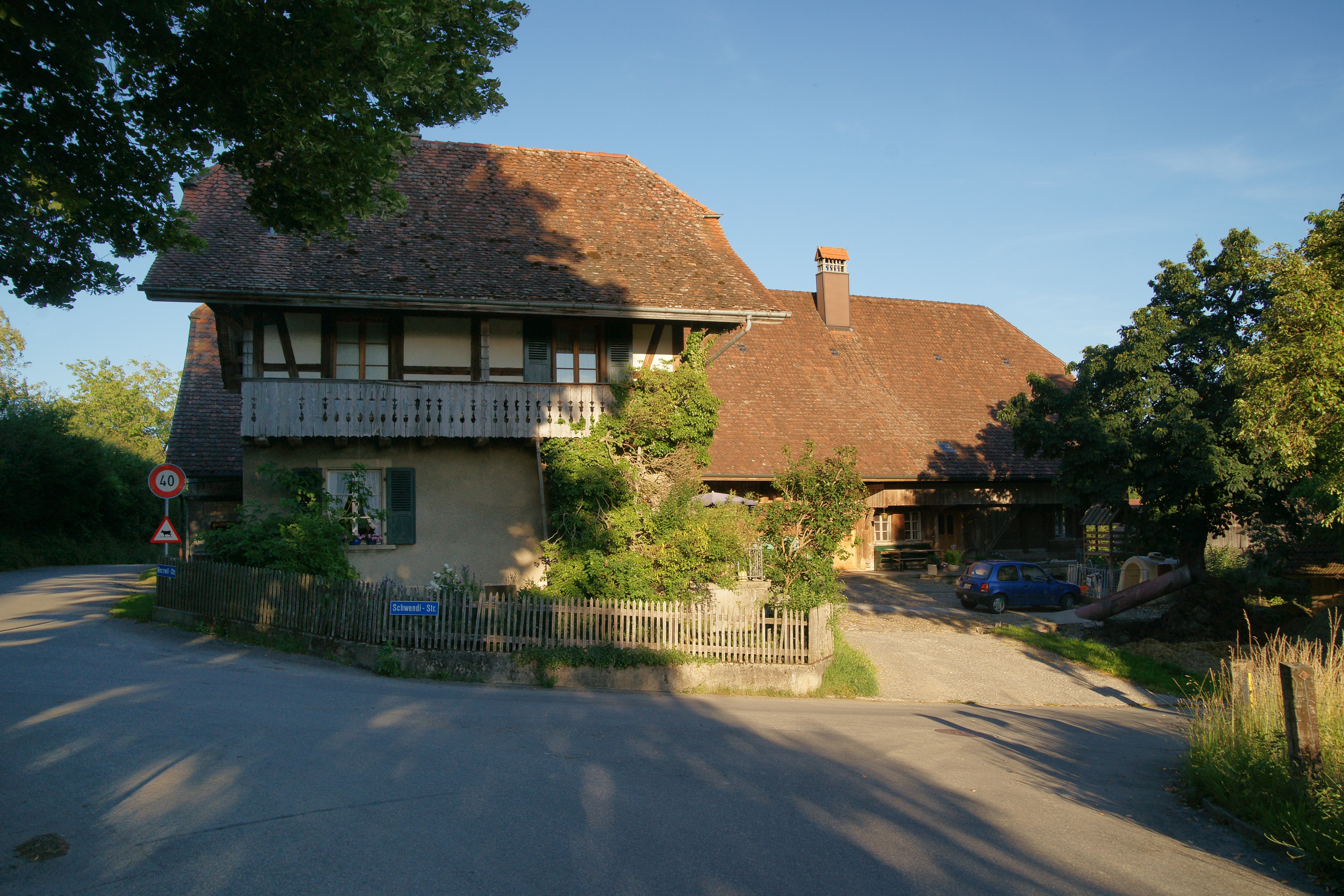
Farm House at Herzwilstrasse 175

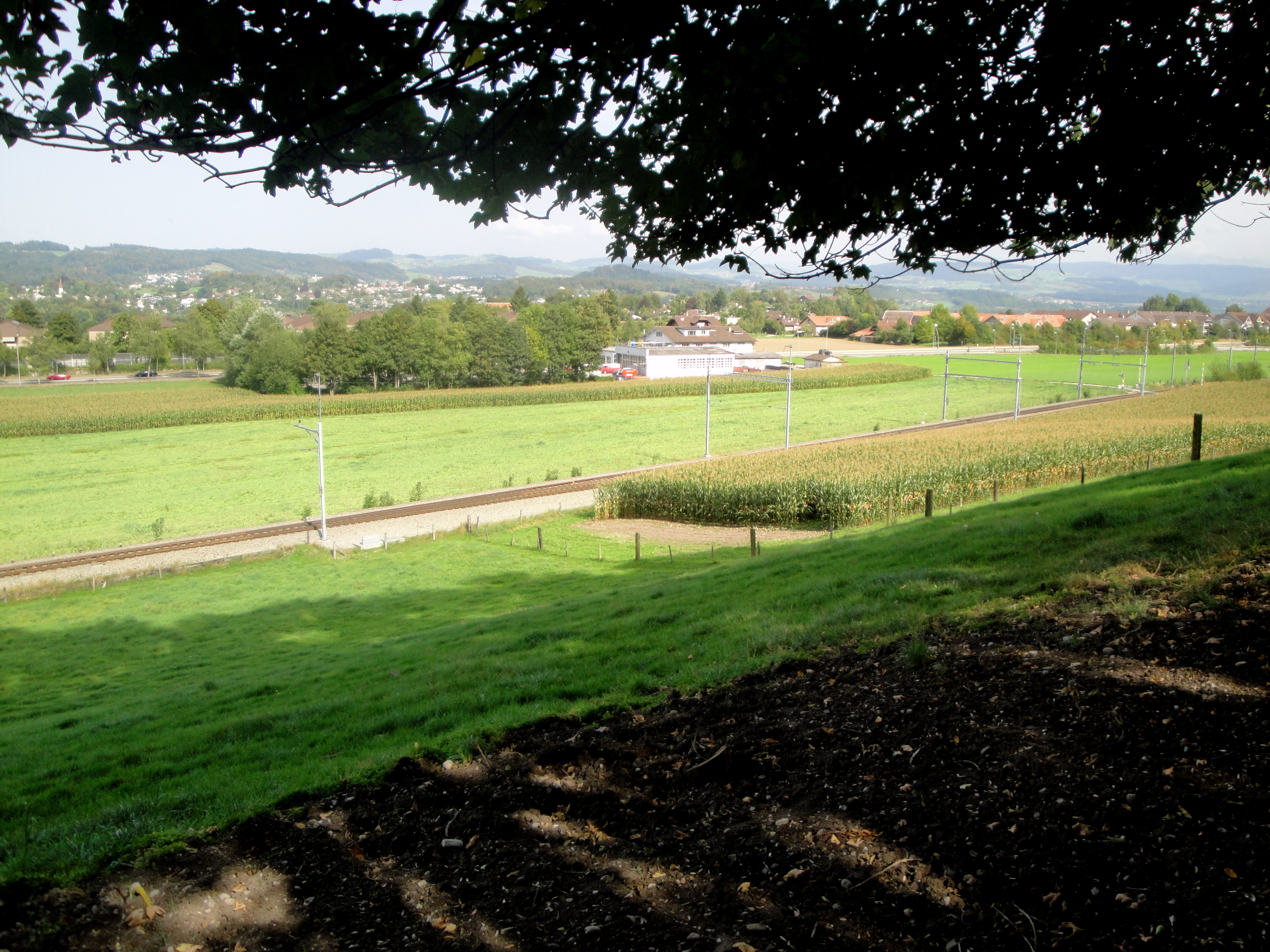
Chly-Wabere (Roman Era Farmhouse)

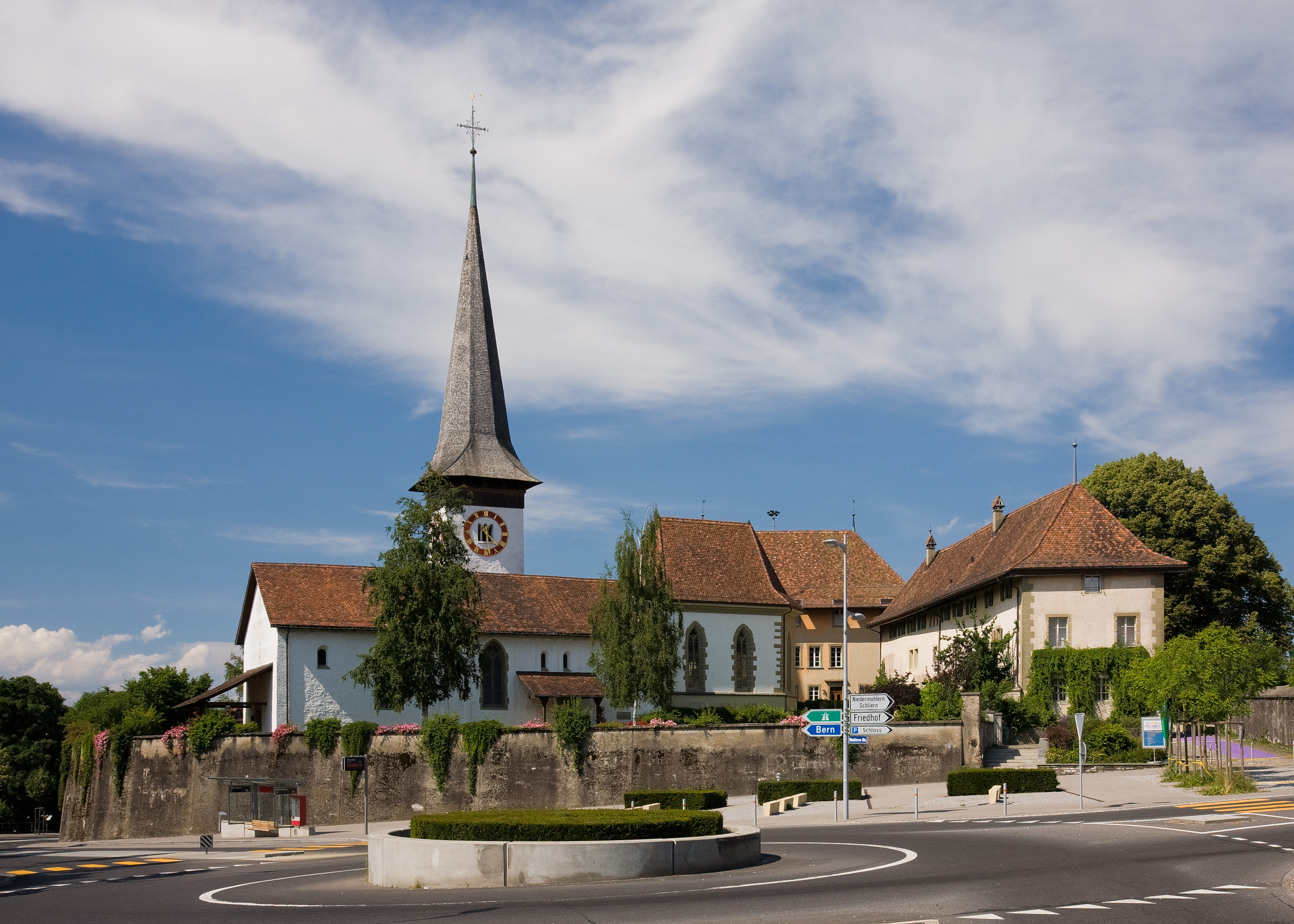
Former Commandry with Castle, Church and Outbuildings

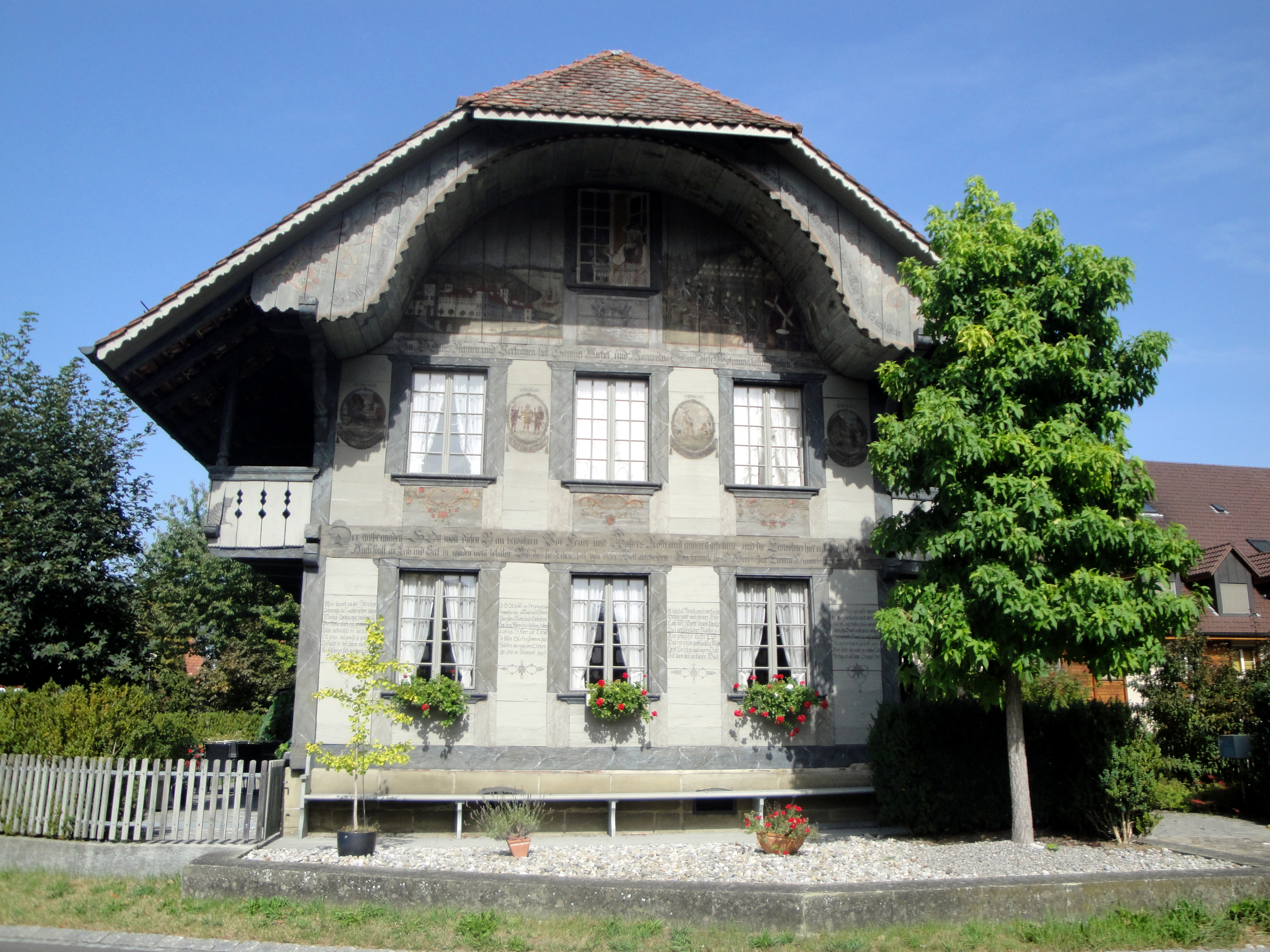
Herrenstock

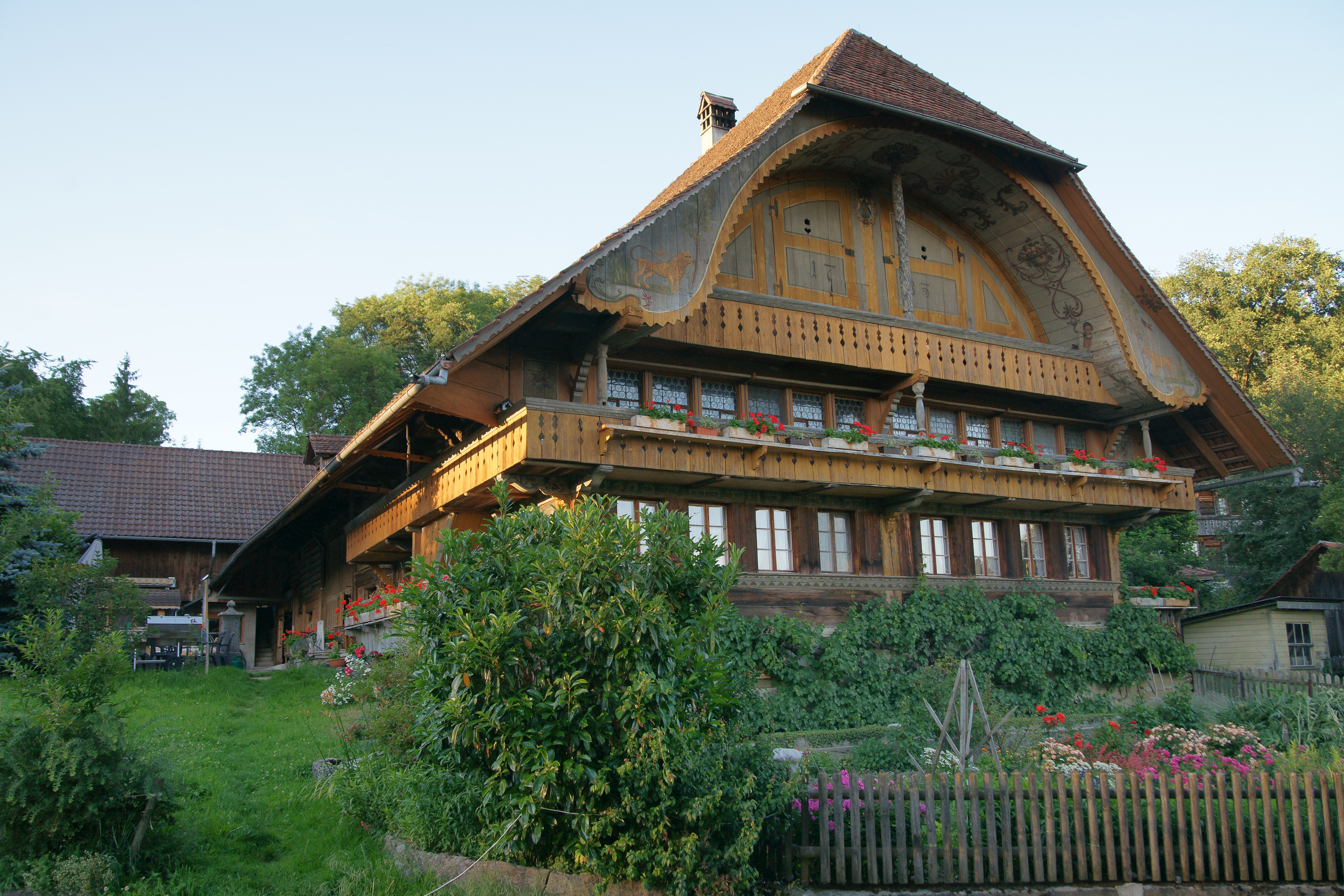
Hof Burren at Mengestorfbergstrasse 191, 193

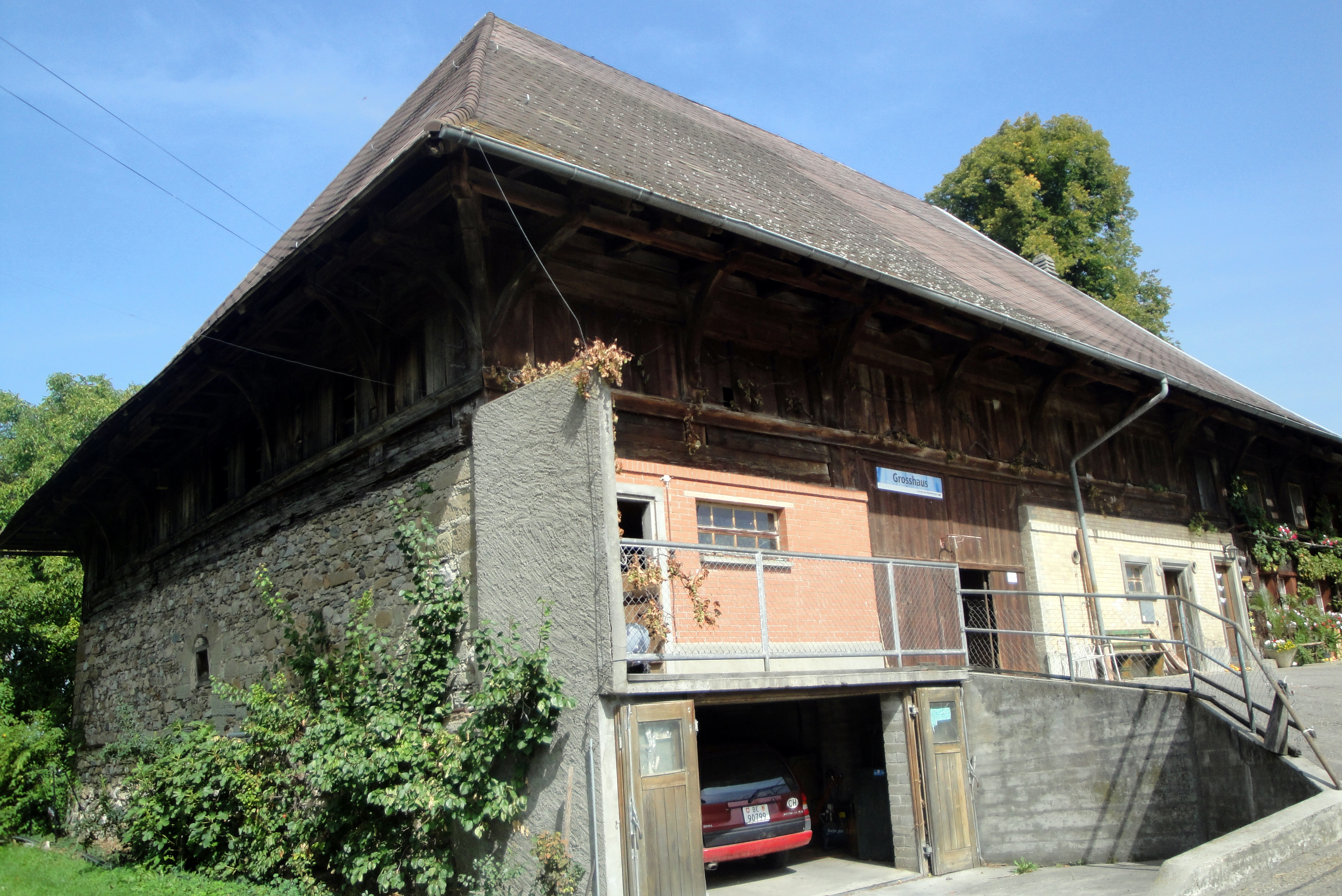
Noble's Wooden House

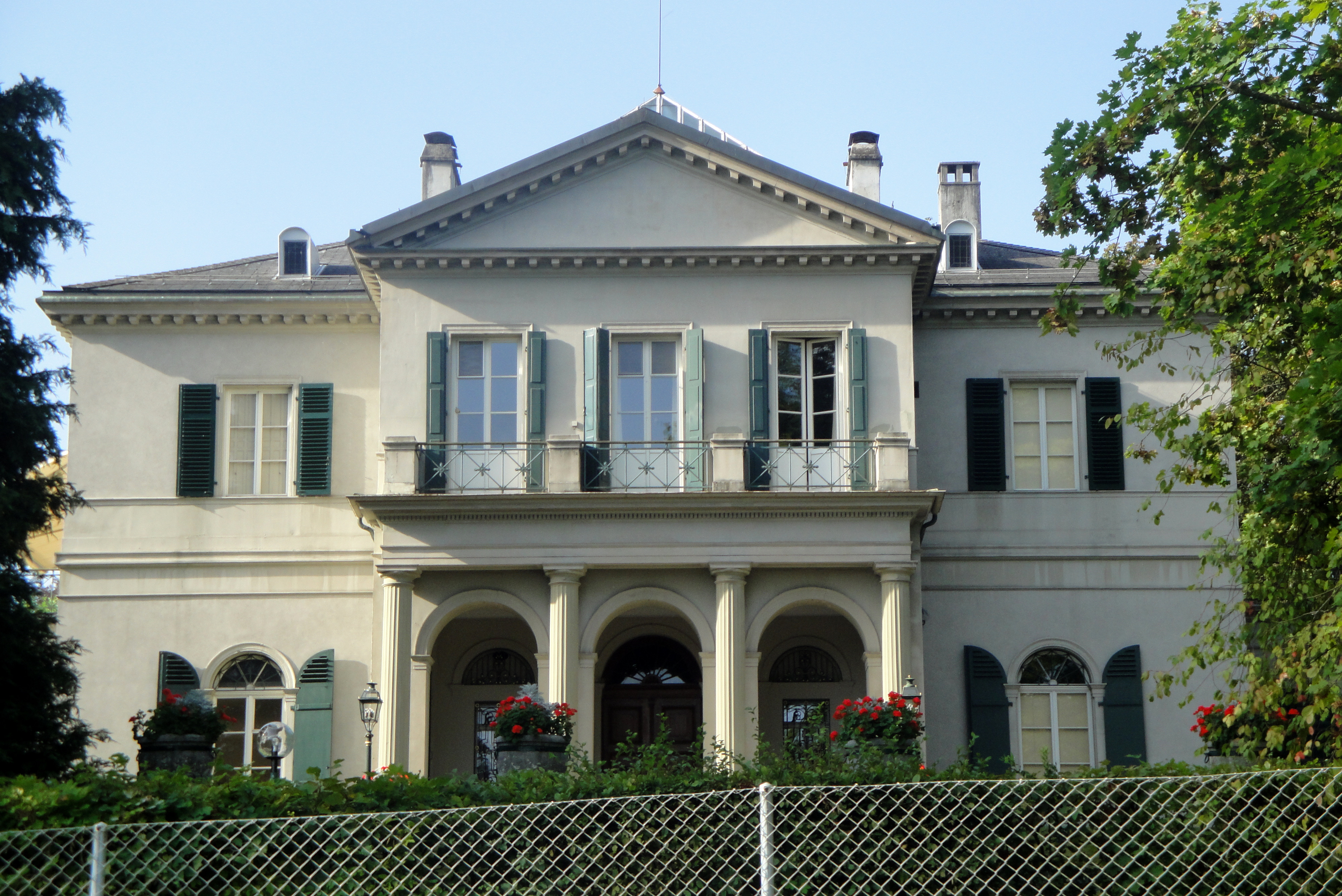
Villa Morillon

== Politics ==
In the 2007 federal election the most popular party was the SVP which received 25.21% of the vote. The next three most popular parties were the SPS (24.07%), the FDP (16.56%) and the Green Party (14.76%). In the federal election, a total of 13,424 votes were cast, and the voter turnout was 49.8%.

== Economy ==
As of 2010, Köniz had an unemployment rate of 3.1%. As of 2008, there were 473 people employed in the primary economic sector and about 157 businesses involved in this sector. 3,985 people were employed in the secondary sector and there were 250 businesses in this sector. 14,713 people were employed in the tertiary sector, with 1,015 businesses in this sector.

In 2008 the total number of full-time equivalent jobs was 15,322. The number of jobs in the primary sector was 308, all of which were in agriculture. The number of jobs in the secondary sector was 3,745 of which 2,413 or (64.4%) were in manufacturing, 16 or (0.4%) were in mining and 1,210 (32.3%) were in construction. The number of jobs in the tertiary sector was 11,269. In the tertiary sector; 2,021 or 17.9% were in wholesale or retail sales or the repair of motor vehicles, 282 or 2.5% were in the movement and storage of goods, 425 or 3.8% were in a hotel or restaurant, 2,223 or 19.7% were in the information industry, 573 or 5.1% were the insurance or financial industry, 1,368 or 12.1% were technical professionals or scientists, 807 or 7.2% were in education and 1,283 or 11.4% were in health care.

In 2000, there were 9,948 workers who commuted into the municipality and 14,010 workers who commuted away. The municipality is a net exporter of workers, with about 1.4 workers leaving the municipality for every one entering. Of the working population, 43.4% used public transportation to get to work, and 34.3% used a private car.

== Religion ==
From the 2000 census, 7,426 or 19.7% were Roman Catholic, while 21,948 or 58.1% belonged to the Swiss Reformed Church. Of the rest of the population, there were 370 members of an Orthodox church (or about 0.98% of the population), there were 42 individuals (or about 0.11% of the population) who belonged to the Christian Catholic Church, and there were 2,336 individuals (or about 6.18% of the population) who belonged to another Christian church. There were 45 individuals (or about 0.12% of the population) who were Jewish, and 980 (or about 2.59% of the population) who were Islamic. There were 154 individuals who were Buddhist, 327 individuals who were Hindu and 47 individuals who belonged to another church. 3,661 (or about 9.69% of the population) belonged to no church, are agnostic or atheist, and 1,574 individuals (or about 4.17% of the population) did not answer the question.

== Education ==
In Köniz about 15,795 or (41.8%) of the population have completed non-mandatory upper secondary education, and 6,423 or (17.0%) have completed additional higher education (either university or a Fachhochschule). Of the 6,423 who completed tertiary schooling, 63.7% were Swiss men, 26.0% were Swiss women, 5.9% were non-Swiss men and 4.4% were non-Swiss women.

The Canton of Bern school system provides one year of non-obligatory Kindergarten, followed by six years of Primary school. This is followed by three years of obligatory lower Secondary school where the students are separated according to ability and aptitude. Following the lower Secondary students may attend additional schooling or they may enter an apprenticeship.

During the 2009–10 school year, there were a total of 4,089 students attending classes in Köniz. There were 32 kindergarten classes with a total of 630 students in the municipality. Of the kindergarten students, 19.2% were permanent or temporary residents of Switzerland (not citizens) and 26.2% have a different mother language than the classroom language. The municipality had 108 primary classes and 2,036 students. Of the primary students, 19.8% were permanent or temporary residents of Switzerland (not citizens) and 29.3% have a different mother language than the classroom language. During the same year, there were 66 lower secondary classes with a total of 1,213 students. There were 15.3% who were permanent or temporary residents of Switzerland (not citizens) and 22.9% have a different mother language than the classroom language.

As of 2000, there were 742 students in Köniz who came from another municipality, while 1,177 residents attended schools outside the municipality.

Köniz is home to the Verein Könizer Mediotheken VKM library. The library has (as of 2008) 72,759 books or other media, and loaned out 285,688 items in the same year. It was open a total of 260 days with average of 34 hours per week during that year.

== Transportation ==
There are eleven railway stations within the borders of the municipality: Niederwangen, Oberwangen, Thörishaus Station, and Thörishaus Dorf on the Lausanne–Bern line; Liebefeld, Köniz, Moos, Gasel, Niederscherli, and Mittelhäusern on the Bern–Schwarzenburg line; and Wabern bei Bern on the Gürbetal line between Bern and Belp. All are served by the Bern S-Bahn and have half-hourly or better service to various destinations.

== Sport ==
FC Köniz is the village's football club.

== Notable people ==
- Linda Geiser (born 1935 in Köniz) a Swiss film and television actress best known for her role in the Swiss TV series Lüthi und Blanc as Johanna Blanc
- Kim Jong Un reportedly attended the Liebefeld Steinhölzli school in Köniz

== Villages ==
In December 2003 the population of the villages that made up the municipality of Köniz had the following populations. Current populations will be similar.

Village	Inhabitants
Köniz	6,925
Wabern	6,422
Liebefeld	4,908
Spiegel	4,506
Schliern	4,102
Niederscherli	2,273
Niederwangen	1,616
Oberwangen	1,085
Schwanden	987
Thörishaus	920
Mittelhäusern	910
Ried	825
Gasel	778
Oberscherli	491
Halen	300
Liebewil	155
Moos	115
Ulmiz	98
Mengestorf	96
Oberried	95
Schlatt	85
Herzwil	63
Total	37,955
