= List of mayors of Köniz =

Coat of arms of Köniz

This is a list of mayors of the city of Köniz, Switzerland.

Mayor (Gemeindepräsident) of Köniz
Term	Mayor	Lifespan	Party	Notes
1942–1965	Walter Antener		SPS/PSS	
1966–1988	Urs Haudenschild		SVP/UDC	
1988–2004	Henri Huber		SPS/PSS	
2004–2013	Luc Mentha	(born 1952)	SPS/PSS	
2014–2017	Ueli Studer	(born 1953)	SVP/UDC	
2018–present	Annemarie Berlinger-Staub	(born 1972)	SP/PS	
