= Schwarzenburg =

- Municipality
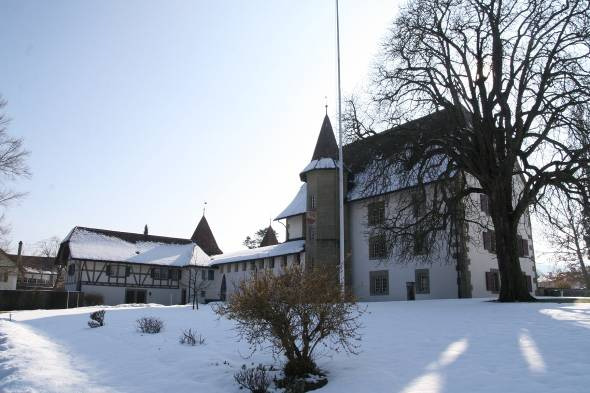

- Flag Coat of arms
- Location of Schwarzenburg
- Location within Switzerland Location within Canton of Bern
- Coordinates: 46°49′N 07°20′E
- Country: Switzerland
- Canton: Bern
- District: Bern-Mittelland

Government
  - Executive: Gemeinderat with 7 members
  - Mayor: Gemeindepräsident(in); Urs Rohrbach GRÜNE (as of 2026)

Area
  - Total: 44.88 km^{2} (17.33 sq mi)
- Elevation: 792 m (2,598 ft)

Population (December 2020)
  - Total: 6,812
  - Density: 151.8/km^{2} (393.1/sq mi)
- Time zone: UTC+01:00 (CET)
  - Summer (DST): UTC+02:00 (CEST)
- Postal code: 3150
- SFOS number: 855
- ISO 3166 code: CH-BE
- Localities: Wahlern and Albligen
- Website: https://www.schwarzenburg.ch/

Schwarzenburg is a municipality in the district of Bern-Mittelland in the canton of Bern in Switzerland. It was created on 1 January 2011 through the merger of the municipalities of Wahlern and Albligen.

== History ==
=== Albligen ===
Albligen is first mentioned in 1346 as Alblingen.

=== Wahlern ===
Wahlern is first mentioned in 1228 as Walerro.

== Geography ==
Aerial view by Walter Mittelholzer (1925)

The former municipalities that now make up Schwarzenburg have a total combined area of 44.8 km^{2} (17.30 sq mi).

== Demographics ==
Schwarzenburg has a population (as of December 2020) of 6,812. As of 2011, 4.7% of the population are resident foreign nationals. Over the last year (2010–2011) the population has changed at a rate of 0.7%. Migration accounted for 0.8%, while births and deaths accounted for -0.2%. Most of the population (as of 2000) speaks German (96%) as their first language, French is the second most common (0.8%) and Italian is the third (0.4%).

As of 2011, children and teenagers (0–19 years old) make up 21.1% of the population, while adults (20–64 years old) make up 60.8% and seniors (over 64 years old) make up 18.1%.

As of 2010, the construction rate of new housing units was 3.9 new units per 1000 residents. The vacancy rate for the municipality, in 2010, was 0.56%. In 2011, single family homes made up 44.9% of the total housing in the municipality.

== Historic population ==
The historical population is given in the following chart:

== Transportation ==
Schwarzenburg is the terminal station of the Bern-Schwarzenburg-Bahn, which opened in 1907 and today forms part of the BLS AG. Lanzenhäusern also has a station.

== Heritage sites of national significance ==
The farm house Aeckenmatt at Aeckenmatt 6, the ruins of Grasburg Castle, the Frühmesskapelle at Käppeligässli 5, the Rossgrabenbrücke (bridge, shared with Rüeggisberg), Schwarzenburg Castle and the granary at Henzischwand 298 A are all listed as Swiss heritage sites of national significance. The entire village of Schwarzenburg and the hamlets of Äckenmatt and Elisried are designated as part of the Inventory of Swiss Heritage Sites.

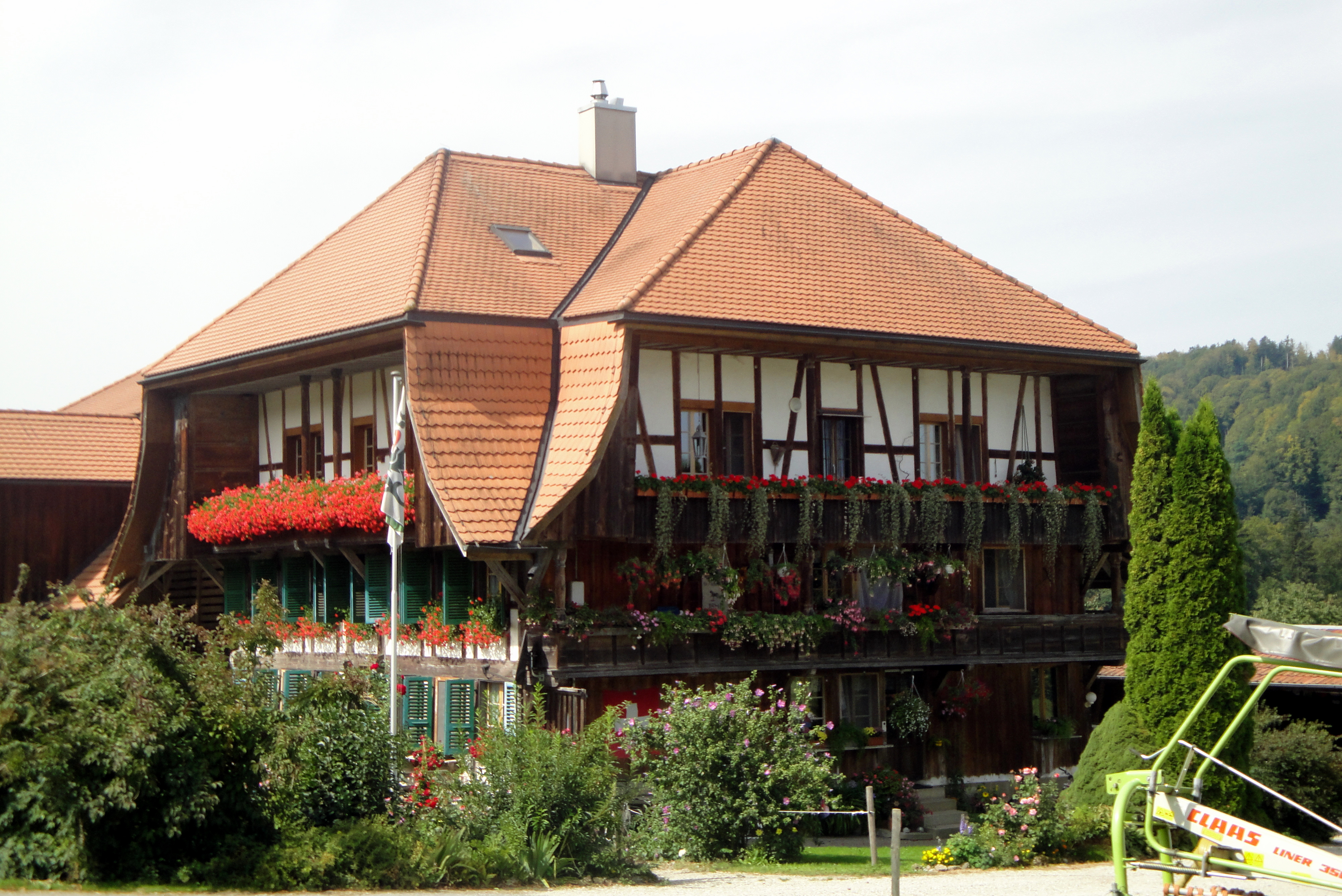
Farm house at Aeckenmatt 6

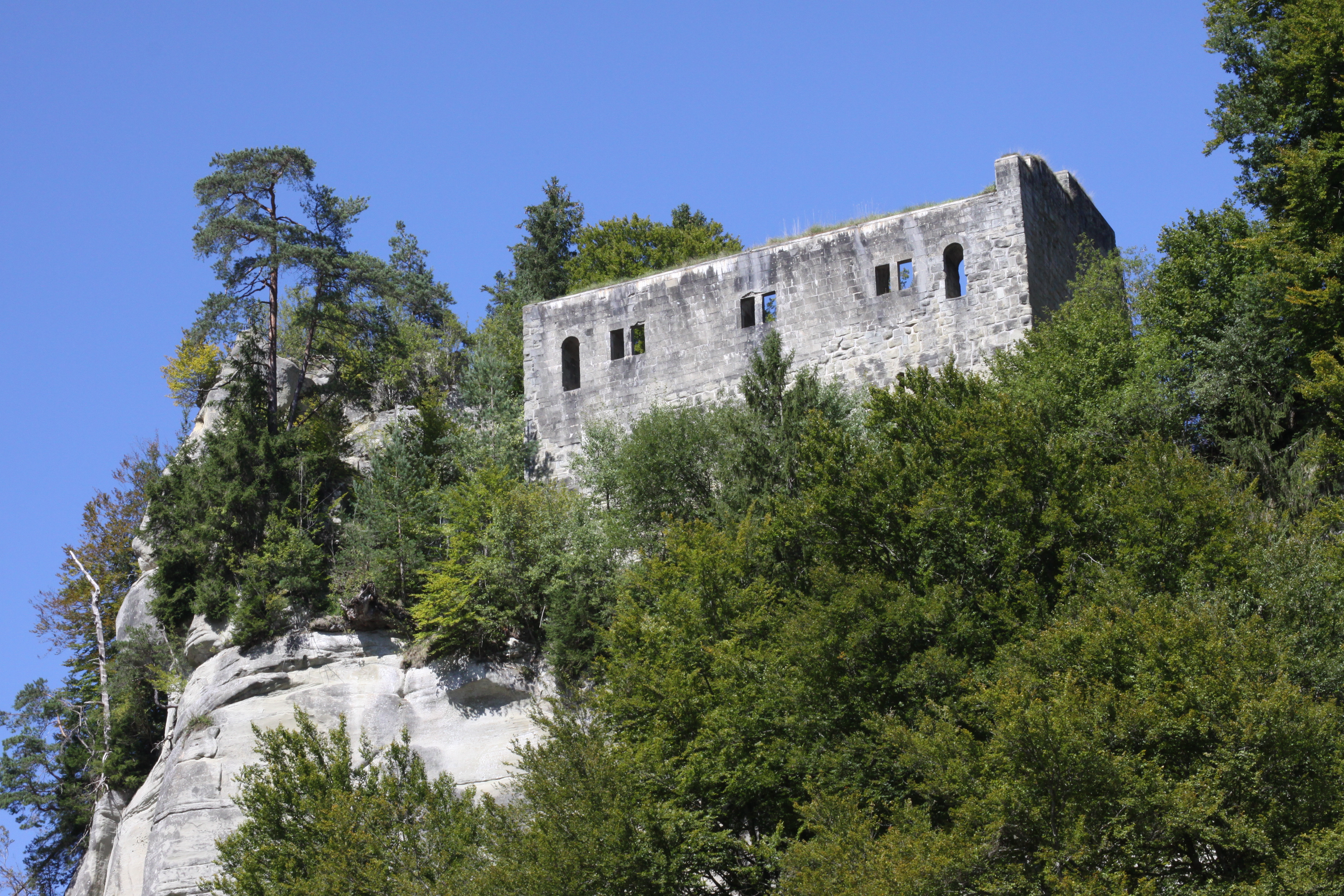
Ruins of Grasburg Castle

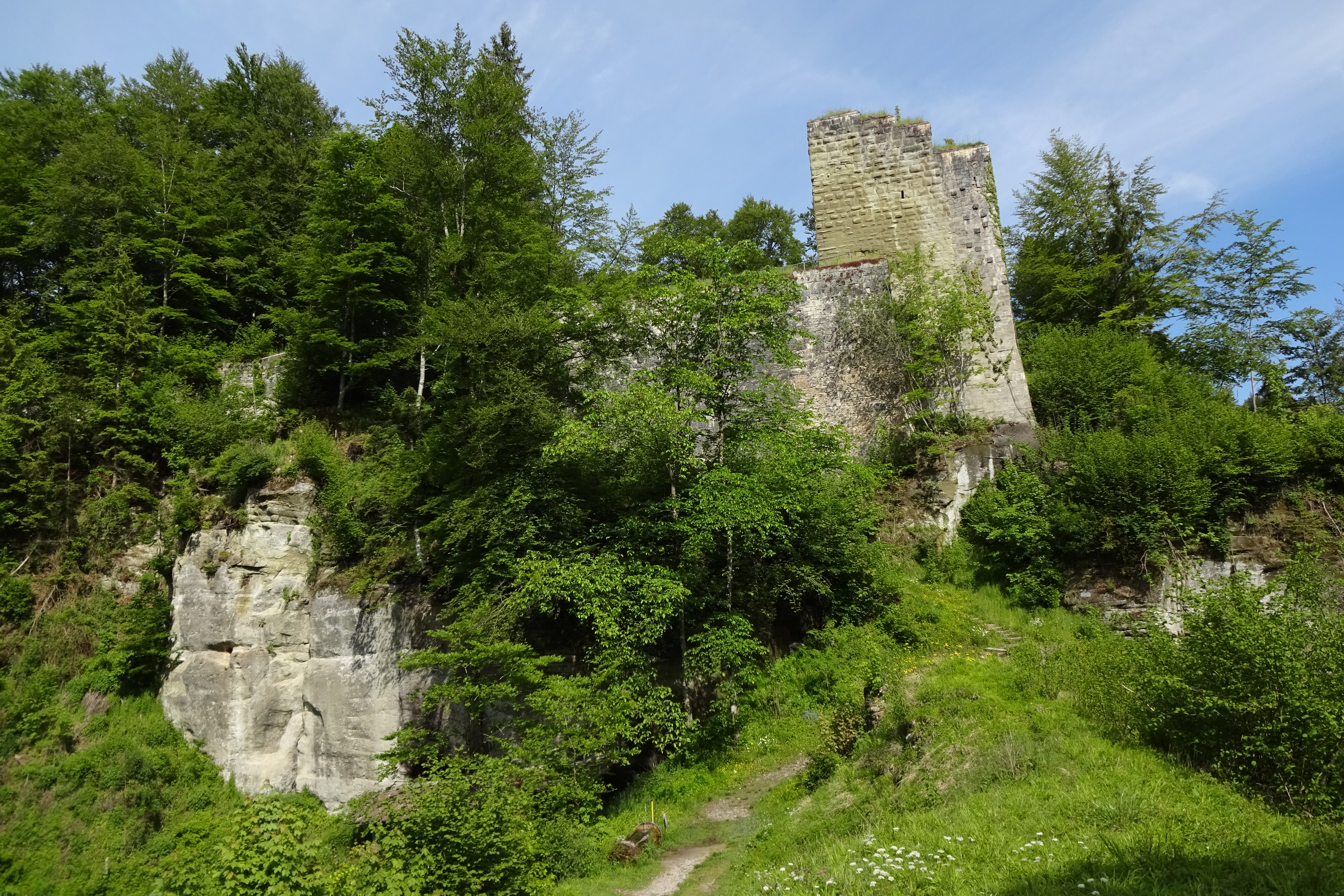
Grasburg castle ruins : front section

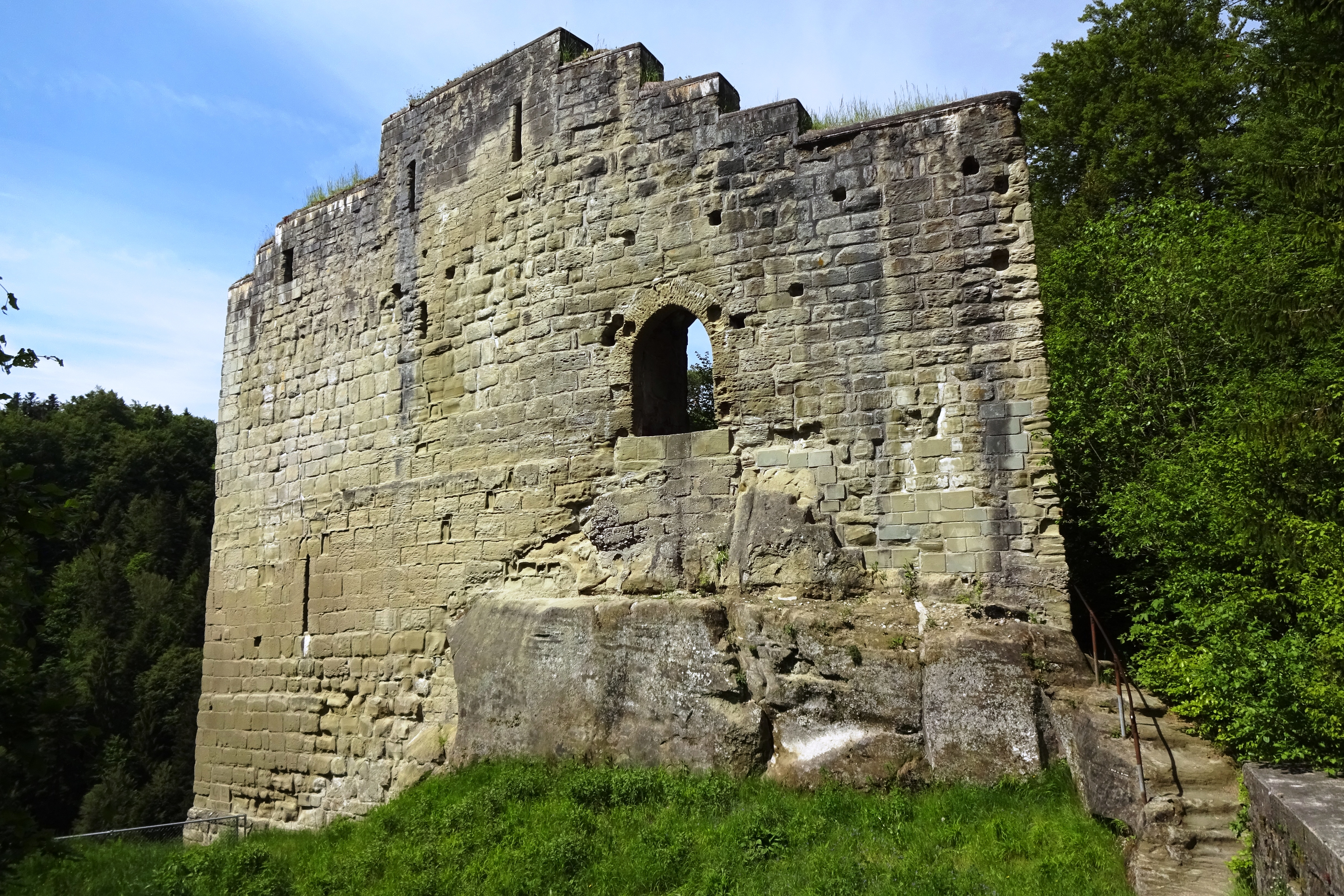
Grasburg castle ruins : rear section

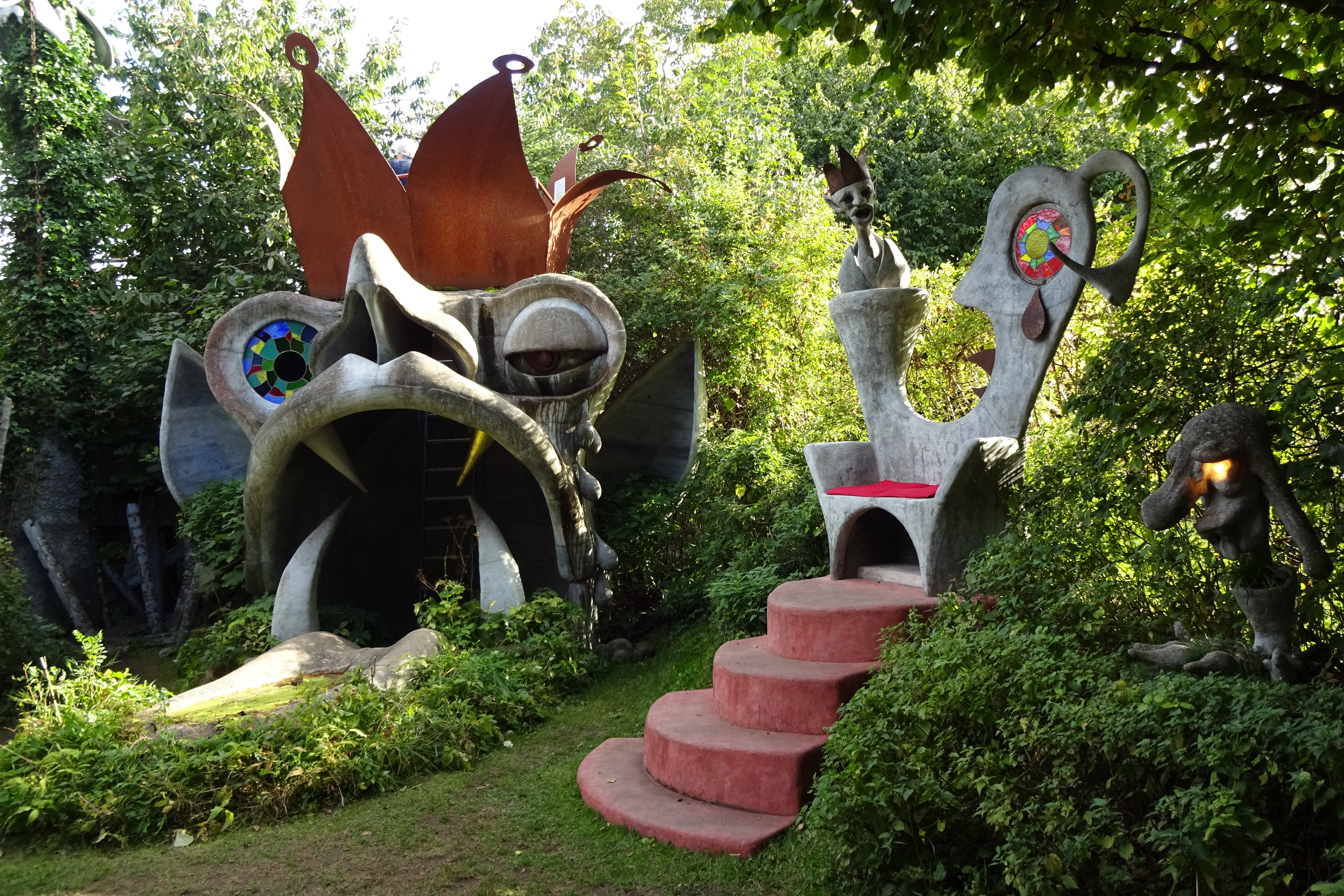
Schwarzenburg - Gnomengarten (Garden of the Gnomes; demolished 2016) : "Pluto, the King of the Garden" (Jürg-Ulrich Ernst)

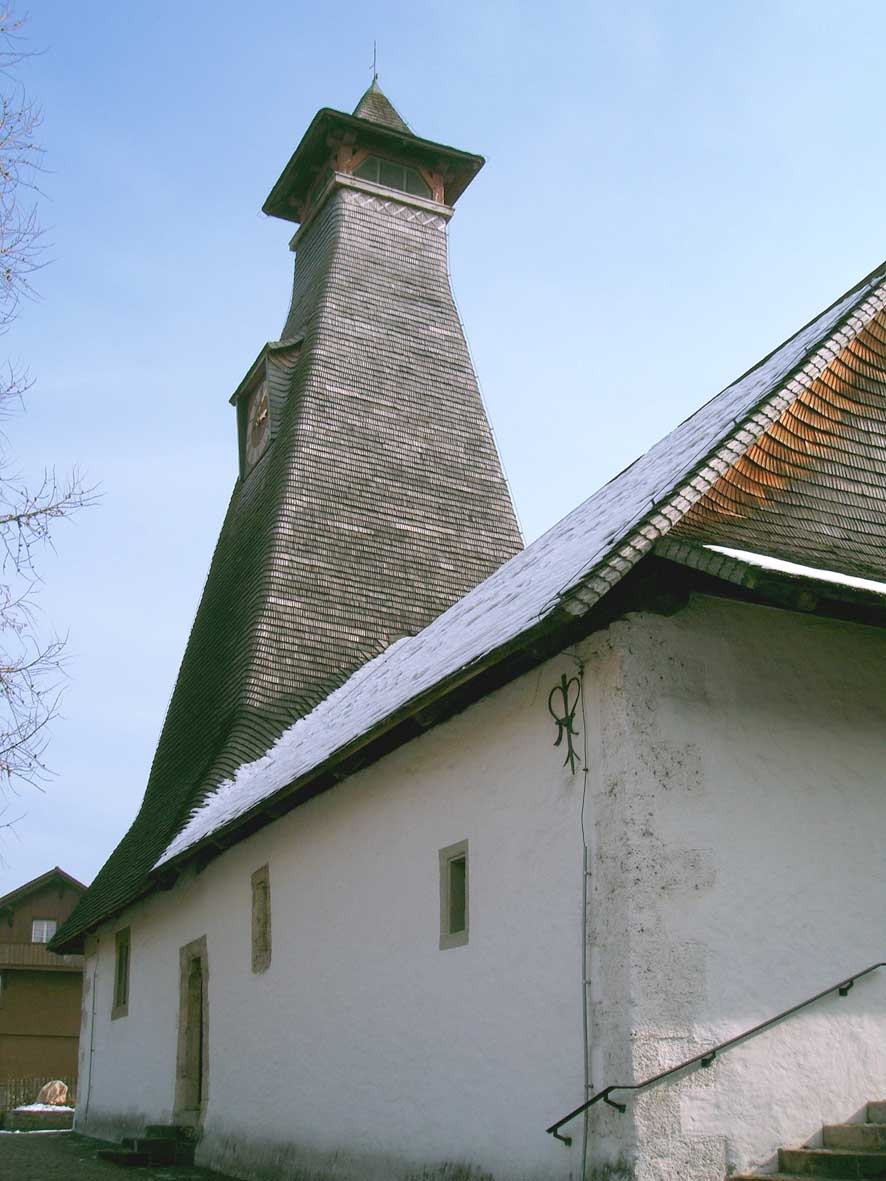
Frühmesskapelle

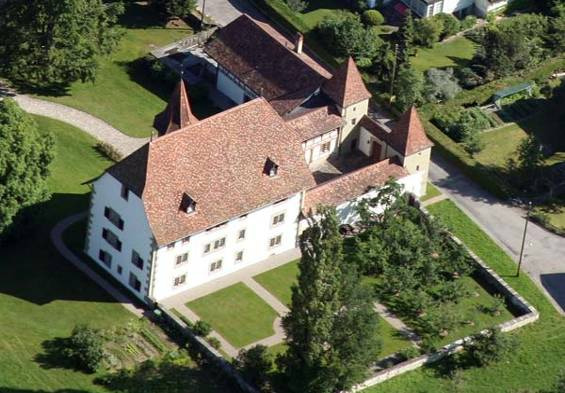
Castle Schwarzenburg

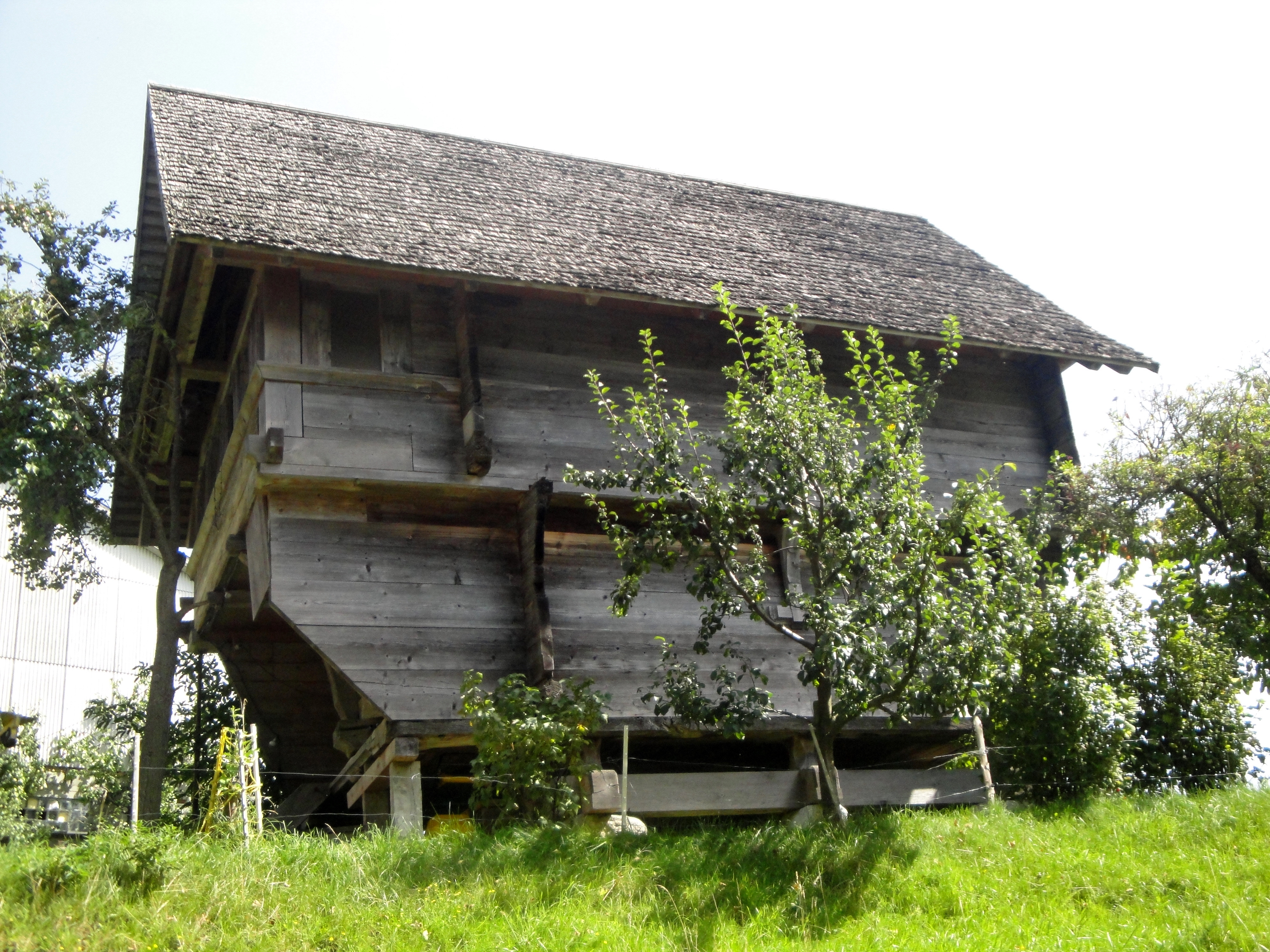
Granary at Henzischwand 298 A

== Politics ==
In the 2011 federal election the most popular party was the Swiss People's Party (SVP) which received 35.7% of the vote. The next three most popular parties were the Social Democratic Party (SP) (20.1%), the Conservative Democratic Party (BDP) (14.7%) and the Green Party (6.9%). In the federal election, a total of 2,783 votes were cast, and the voter turnout was 52.1%.

== Economy ==
As of 2011, Schwarzenburg had an unemployment rate of 1.24%. As of 2008, there were a total of 3,032 people employed in the municipality. Of these, there were 625 people employed in the primary economic sector and about 218 businesses involved in this sector. 1,088 people were employed in the secondary sector and there were 80 businesses in this sector. 1,319 people were employed in the tertiary sector, with 187 businesses in this sector. Of the working population, 21.3% used public transportation to get to work, and 42.7% used a private car.

In 2011 the average local and cantonal tax rate on a married resident, with two children, of Schwarzenburg making 150,000 CHF was 12.9%, while an unmarried resident's rate was 19%. For comparison, the average rate for the entire canton in the same year, was 14.2% and 22.0%, while the nationwide average was 12.3% and 21.1% respectively.

In 2011 a total of 3.5% of the population received direct financial assistance from the government.

== Religion ==
In 2000 about 79.6% of the population belonged to a Protestant church, 8.6% were Roman Catholic and 5.5% had no religious affiliation. Schwarzenburg, along with Thun, is the area where most of the Amish and ethnic Mennonites in the United States trace their ancestry from.

== Climate ==
Between 1981 and 2010 Schwarzenburg had an average of 136.7 days of rain or snow per year and on average received 1,296 mm (51.0 in) of precipitation. The wettest month was May during which time Schwarzenburg received an average of 154 mm (6.1 in) of rain or snow. During this month there was precipitation for an average of 14.2 days. The driest month of the year was February with an average of 67 mm (2.6 in) of precipitation over 10.3 days.

== Education ==
In Schwarzenburg about 55.9% of the population have completed non-mandatory upper secondary education, and 18.2% have completed additional higher education (either university or a Fachhochschule). Schwarzenburg is home to the Schul- und Gemeindebibliothek (municipal library of Schwarzenburg). The library has (as of 2008) 20,690 books or other media, and loaned out 94,725 items in the same year. It was open a total of 230 days with average of 20.5 hours per week during that year.
