= Schwarzenburg railway station =

Railway station in Schwarzenburg, Switzerland

Schwarzenburg
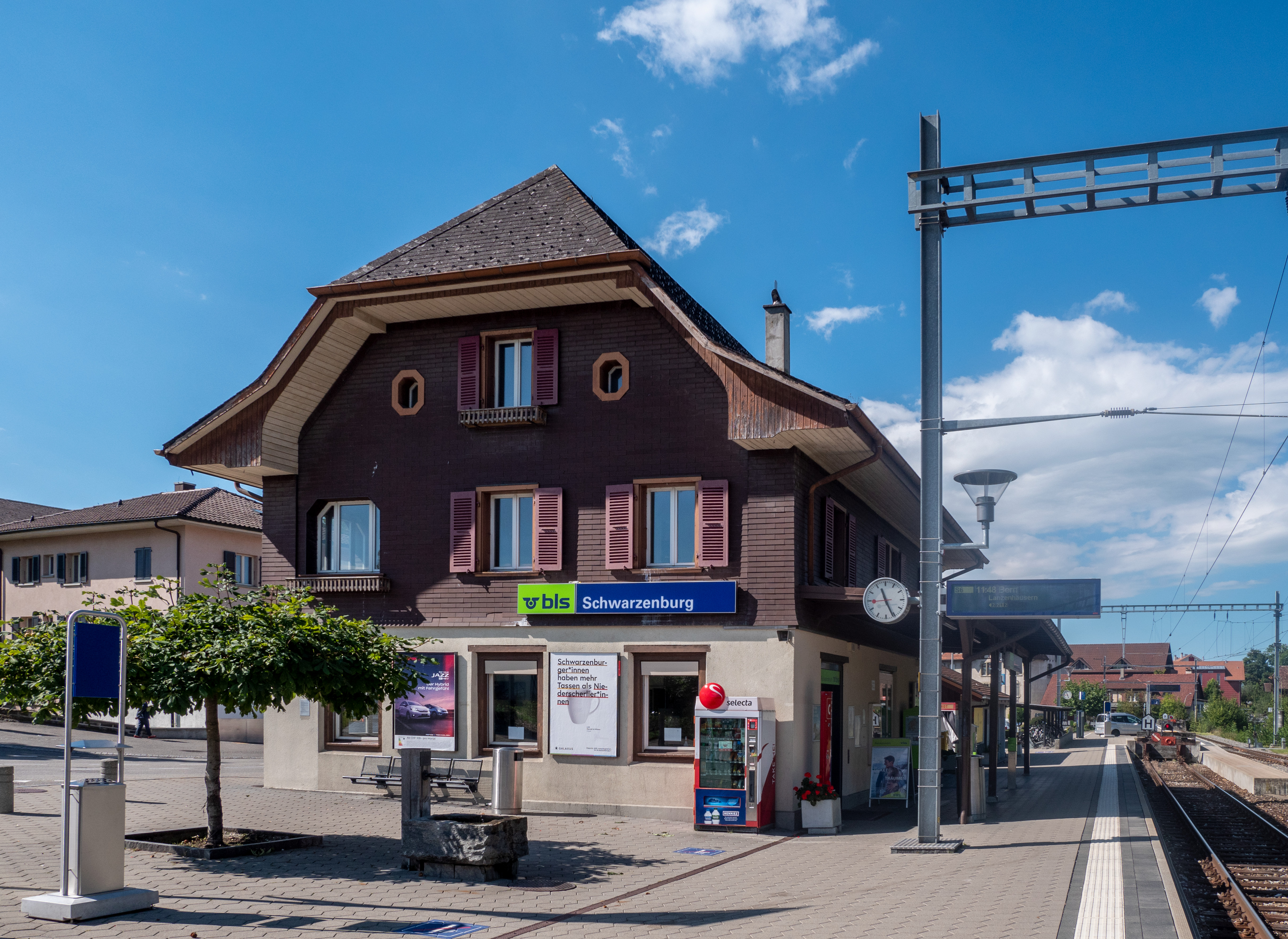
- The station building in 2020

General information
- Location: Schwarzenburg; Switzerland
- Coordinates: 46°49′08″N 7°20′35″E
- Elevation: 792 m (2,598 ft)
- Owner: BLS AG
- Line: Bern–Schwarzenburg line
- Distance: 20.9 km (13.0 mi) from Bern
- Platforms: 2 side platforms
- Tracks: 2
- Train operators: BLS AG
- Connections: PostAuto AG bus lines; tpf bus line

Construction
- Parking: Yes (17 spaces)
- Accessible: Yes

Other information
- Station code: 8507089 (SCBG)
- Fare zone: 627 (Libero); 16 (frimobil)

Passengers
- 2023: 2'000 per weekday (BLS)

Services
Preceding station	Bern S-Bahn	Following station
Terminus	S6	Lanzenhäusern towards Bern
Location

Schwarzenburg railway station (German: Bahnhof Schwarzenburg) is a railway station in the municipality of Schwarzenburg, in the Swiss canton of Bern. It is the southern terminus of the standard gauge Bern–Schwarzenburg line of BLS AG.

== Services ==
As of the December 2024 timetable change, the following services stop at Schwarzenburg:

- Bern S-Bahn S6: half-hourly service to Bern.
