= Bern–Schwarzenburg railway line =

Railway line in the canton of Bern, Switzerland

Bern–Schwarzenburg

Overview
- Line number: 306
- Termini: Bern; Schwarzenburg

Technical
- Line length: 20.75 km (12.89 mi)
- Number of tracks: 1 or 2
- Track gauge: 1,435 mm (4 ft 8 1/2 in)
- Electrification: 15 kV/16.7 Hz AC overhead catenary
- Maximum incline: 3.5%

Route map

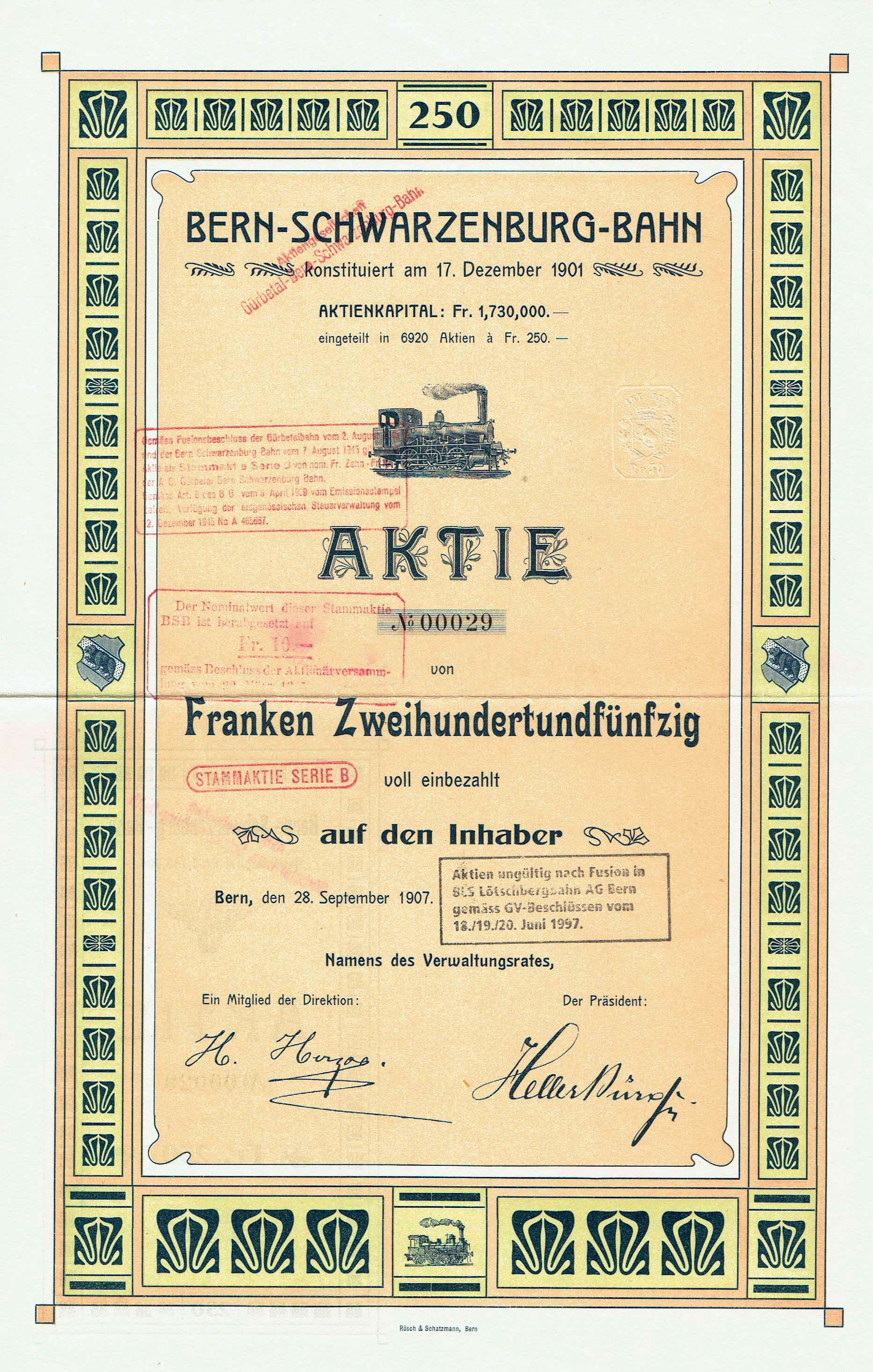
Share certificate issued with a face value of 250 francs of the Bern-Schwarzenburg-Bahn of 28 September 1907

The Bern–Schwarzenburg railway line is a railway line in Switzerland. It was built by the Bern-Schwarzenburg-Bahn (Bern-Schwarzenburg Railway, BSB). It was opened on 1 June 1907 between Bern and Schwarzenburg.

A train derailed in Ausserholligen station on 28 June 1916 and a carriage and overturned; one passenger died and 20 were injured.

The railway company merged on 1 January 1944 with the Gürbetalbahn (GTB) to form the Gürbetal-Bern-Schwarzenburg-Bahn (GBS), which continued the operation of the BSB line.

The GBS was then part of an operating group led by the Bern–Lötschberg–Simplon railway (Bern-Lötschberg-Simplon-Bahn, BLS). The four group companies merged in 1997 to form the BLS Lötschberg Railway, which in turn merged with the Regionalverkehr Mittelland (RM) in 2006 to form BLS AG, which now owns the former BSB line.
