= Cholera (food) =

Swiss savoury pie

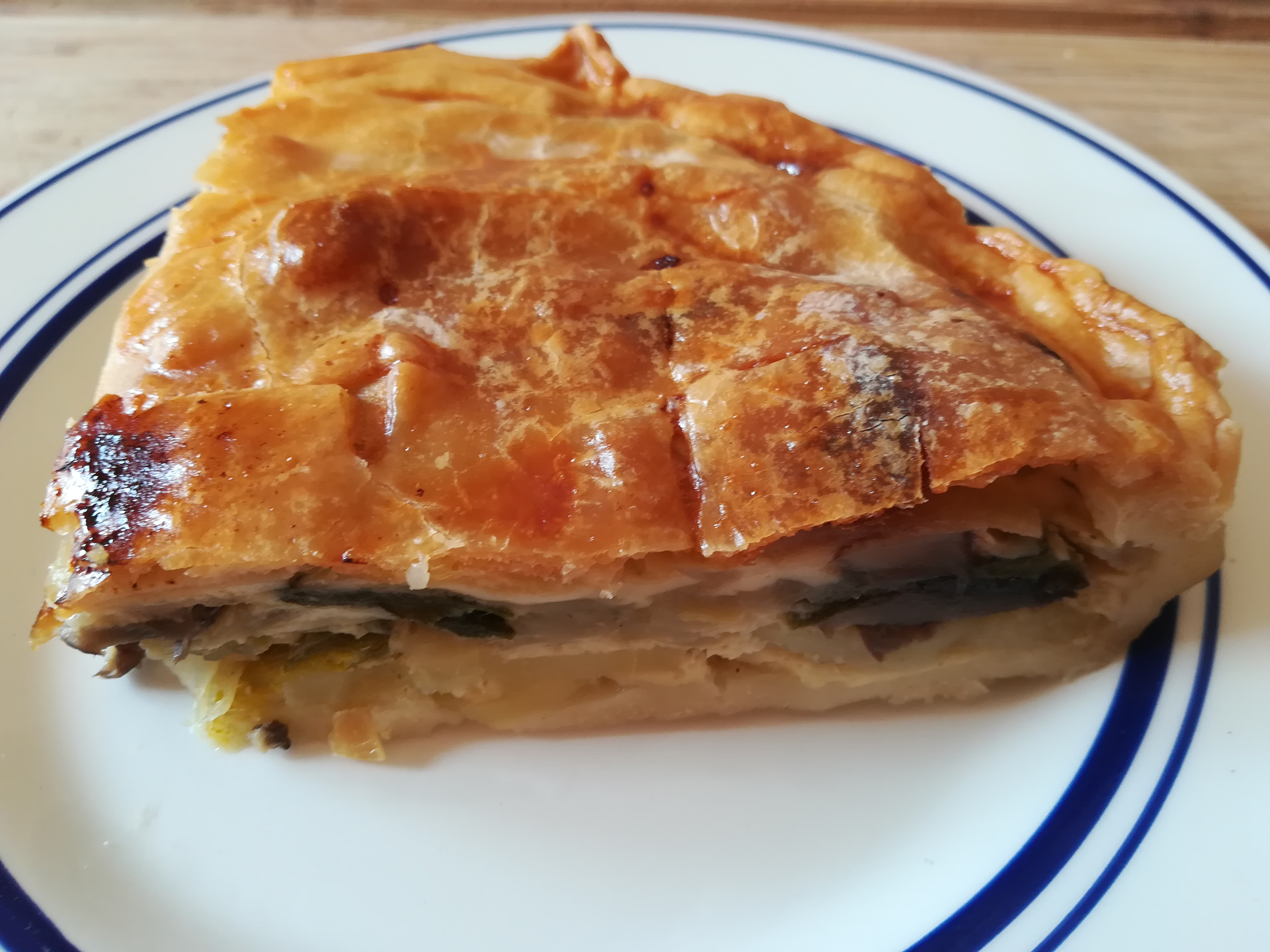
- Type: Savoury pastry
- Place of origin: Switzerland
- Region or state: Valais
- Associated cuisine: Swiss cuisine

A cholera is a pastry filled with potatoes, vegetables, fruits and cheese originating in the Valais region of Switzerland.

Originally, the local ingredients for such a dish were apples, pears, potatoes, onions, leeks, raclette cheese (usually Gomser) and bacon. The dish is mostly known in the region of Valais within Switzerland.

== Etymology ==
The origin of the unusual name for the dish remains unclear. A folk etymological explanation purports that during an epidemic of the disease cholera in 1836, people in the region improvised a dish involving pastry and whatever food they had at hand, as normal trade was disrupted. After the epidemic subsided, chefs returned to the concept of putting regional ingredients in a savoury tart, and the "cholera" dish has lasted since.

However, various other linguistic theories try to link the origin of the name to Chola or Cholu (Valais German for coal) as the pastry would be baked on coals. Alternatively, Cholära is also the Valais German term for a specific room within a bakery where coal would be gathered.
