= Schenkele =

Central European fritter

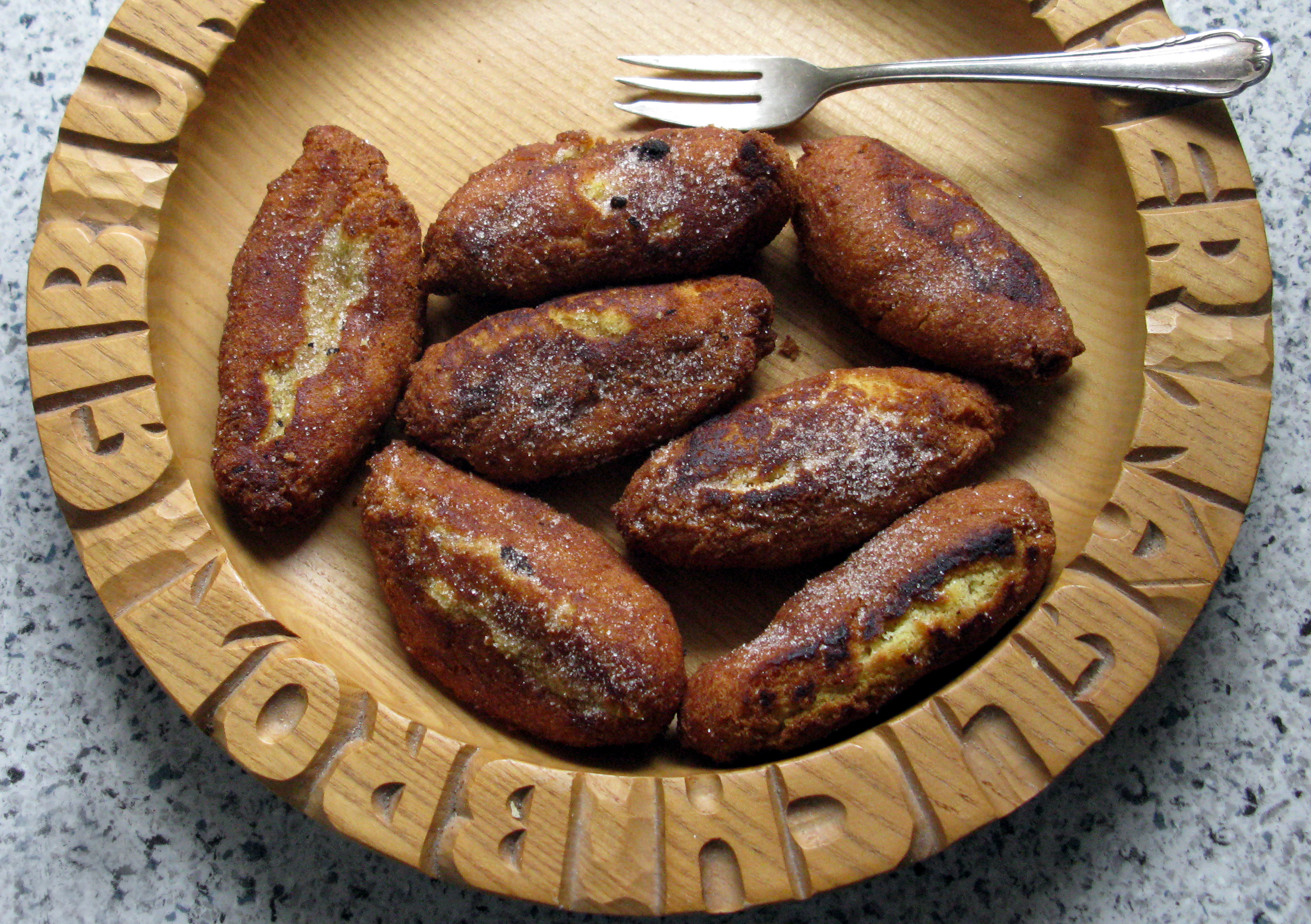
- Type: Fritter
- Place of origin: Switzerland, Alsace
- Associated cuisine: Swiss cuisine, Alsatian cuisine
- Main ingredients: Flour, sugar, butter eggs, ground nuts
- Ingredients generally used: Candied peel, kirsch

A Schenkele, or Schenkela (in Alsace), Schänkeli, Schenkeli, Schenggeli, Schänggeli (in Switzerland) is a small cylindrical sweet fritter eaten around Christmas and Fasnacht in Alsace, and in German-speaking Switzerland.

They are also known as pieds de chèvre ("goat's feet") in the Canton of Jura, due to the small incision made at one end of the dough making them resemble cloven hoofs. Other names include cuisses de dames ("women's thighs") in France.

A reference to Schenkele can be found as early as 1787 by Kaspar von Stieler as "im Elsass schenkele zur bezeichnung kleiner, länglicher brödchen" ("in Alsace schenkele to mean small, elongated bread rolls").

== Preparation ==
Schenkele are made from a dough of flour, sugar, butter, eggs, ground almonds or walnuts additionally flavored using candied orange or lemon peel and Kirsch. The dough is formed into finger-sized cylinders, deep-fried and dusted with sugar. They are shelf-stable and their flavor intensifies with storage.

== See also ==
- Culinary Heritage of Switzerland
