= Swiss cuisine =

Culinary traditions of Switzerland

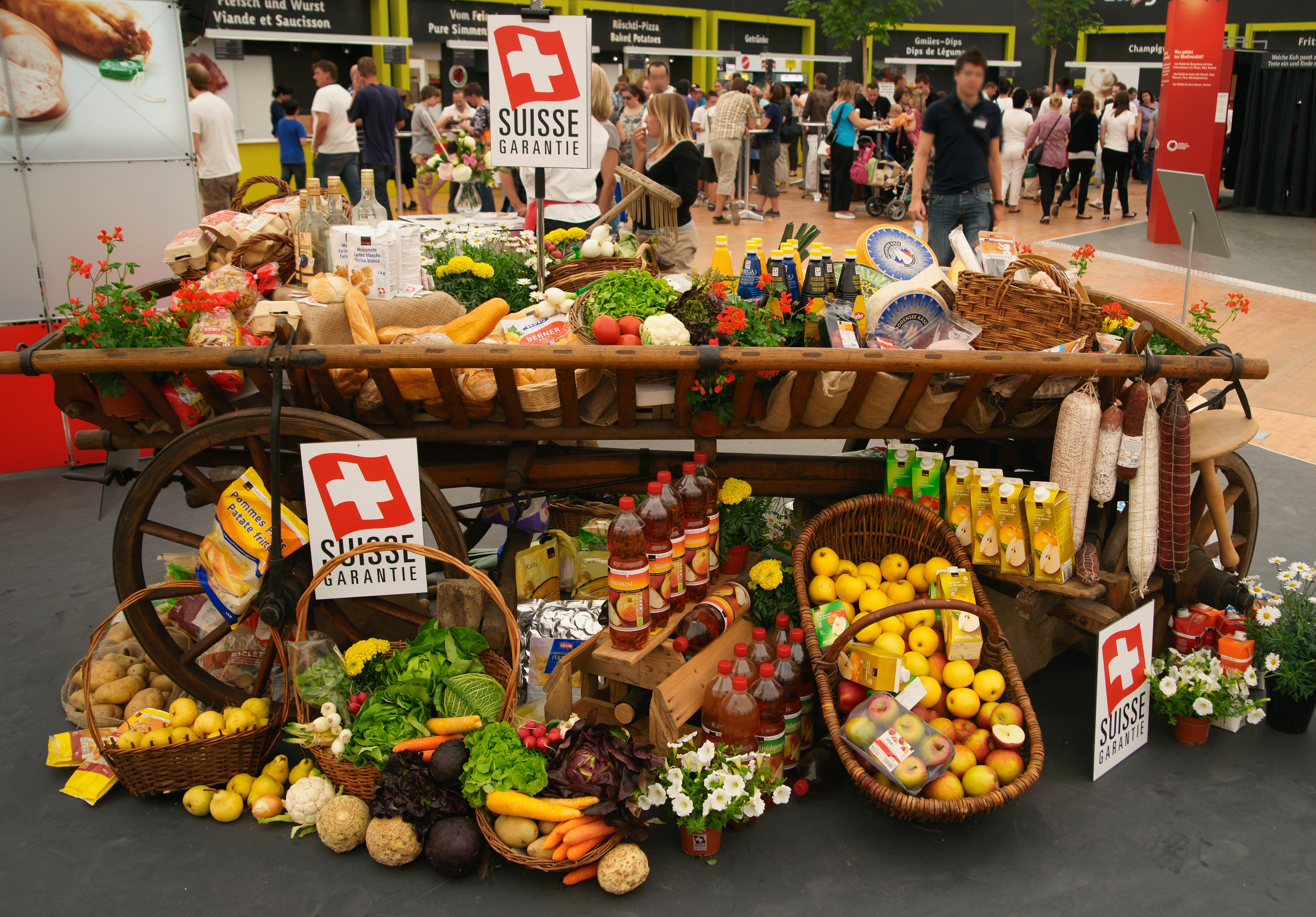
A cart displaying food produced in Switzerland

Swiss cuisine is an ensemble of national, regional, and local dishes, consisting of the ingredients, recipes, and cooking techniques developed in Switzerland or assimilated from other cultures, particularly neighboring countries. The diversity and comprehensiveness of Swiss gastronomy reflect Swiss linguistic, cultural, and geographical diversity. The climate of Switzerland allows for a large variety of terroirs and, therefore, a wide range of indigenous foods, from simple cereals and vegetables to refined products such as cheese and wine.

Switzerland is historically an agricultural country, with many regions being isolated from each other by the Alps. Therefore, one of the main characteristics of Swiss cuisine is its simplicity, with many dishes made up of few but hearty ingredients, often of dairy origin. Swiss cuisine evolved dramatically during the last centuries. Probably the most significant changes occurred after colonization of the Americas and the introduction of now-widely used ingredients such as potatoes, maize, and cocoa. The increase in purchasing power and a certain homogenization of taste have allowed the emergence of some emblematic national dishes such as fondue and rösti.

The most well-known Swiss products include cheese, meat specialties, wine, and chocolate. Switzerland is particularly renowned for its wide variety of cheeses and cured meats, which reflect the country’s regional traditions. Some traditional Swiss food products are protected by a geographical indication (AOP) and are exported worldwide. Over the centuries, Switzerland has developed a strong food industry, particularly associated with dairy and chocolate production, which plays an important role in the national economy.

== Agriculture and foods ==
The climatic and cultural diversity of Switzerland is reflected in the diversity of its food products. Various cereals and fruits are cultivated in the lower regions, while the warmest and sunniest areas in the south lend themselves to growing grapes, chestnuts, and even olives. The other most common fruits cultivated in Switzerland are apples, pears, apricots, cherries, plums, and strawberries. The mountainous and coldest areas feature the perhaps most emblematic agricultural practices of Switzerland: dairy farming and alpine transhumance.

Swiss cuisine comprises a variety of staple foods. These typically include bread, potatoes, pasta, rice and polenta. Potatoes are particularly ubiquitous in Swiss cuisine, although this has been only the case since the late 18th century. They are notably used in rösti, a popular dish that is eaten all over Switzerland, and originally a breakfast food. Bread and cereals are eaten on a daily basis in Switzerland. Muesli, which is commonly eaten for breakfast, goes by the name of "Birchermüesli" ("Birchermiesli" in some regions). For breakfast, most Swiss enjoy sliced bread with butter and jam; bread also accompanies most meals. There is a wide variety of breads made in Switzerland, from pain de seigle to Zopf. Tarts and quiches are also traditional Swiss dishes. Tarts in particular are made with all sorts of toppings, from sweet apple to onion.

Pork, poultry, and beef are the most consumed meats in Switzerland. Pork is particularly omnipresent in Swiss cuisine; it is both consumed as cooked and cured meat. Swiss meat specialties are highly diversified, including all sorts of pork sausages, bratwursts, smoked ham, salami, prosciutto, and others. Famous meat products include Grisons Meat (air-dried beef) and the "national sausage", cervelat. Fish is eaten in moderation, traditionally once in a week. Swiss lakes and rivers provide a small fraction of fish and shellfish consumed in the country. These include the popular perch and fera, which are served in lakeshore restaurants.

Foods associated with Switzerland often use milk as an essential ingredient; butter and cream are classic ingredients in Swiss cuisine. They notably include hard cheeses and chocolate. Swiss cheeses, in particular Emmental, Gruyère, Vacherin, and Appenzeller, are famous Swiss products. Two of the most popular Swiss dishes are fondue and raclette, which essentially consist of melted cheese accompanied with bread or potatoes. The first solid milk chocolate was invented in Switzerland in 1875 and Switzerland has continued to be strongly associated with chocolate ever since then, with a thriving Swiss chocolate industry.

Food preferences vary within Switzerland, often reflecting languages: the German-speaking north and east (the predominant linguistic area) has strong ties with Central Europe, whereas the French-speaking west and the Italian-speaking south tend to have more ties with Western and Mediterranean Europe. This applies notably to starchy foods, dairy products and fish. While potatoes, rice and pasta are commonly eaten everywhere in Switzerland, the proportion of pasta and rice is larger in the Italian-speaking regions. Conversely, fats like cream and butter are eaten in larger proportions in the German-speaking regions. Fish is also more commonly eaten in French- and Italian-speaking Switzerland. Those differences are also noticeable in wine and beer drinking habits.

Many Swiss culinary specialties overlap with those of neighboring countries. Notable examples include fondue and raclette (adopted in France), risotto (originating from Italy), and spätzli (shared with Austria and Germany).

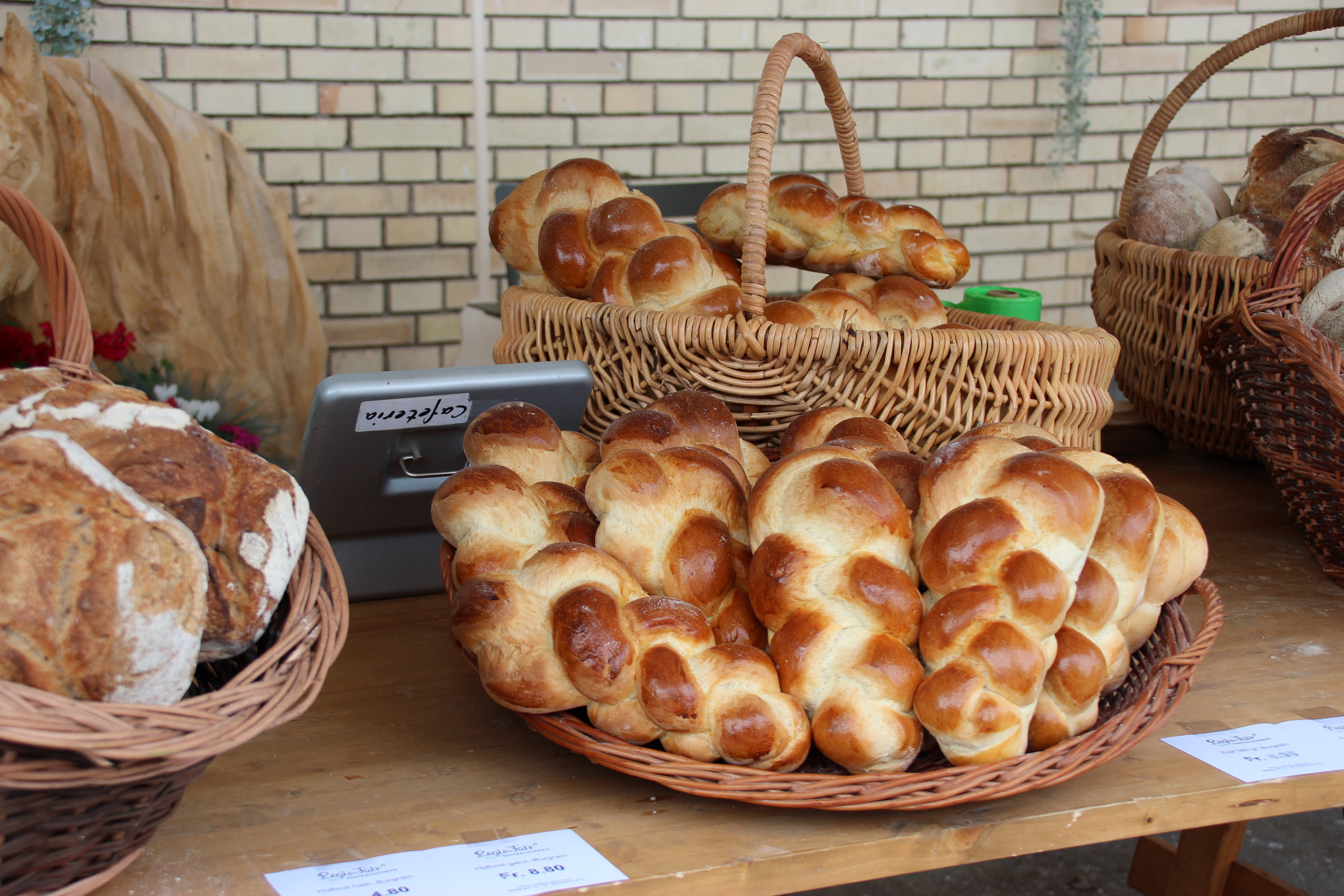
Breads

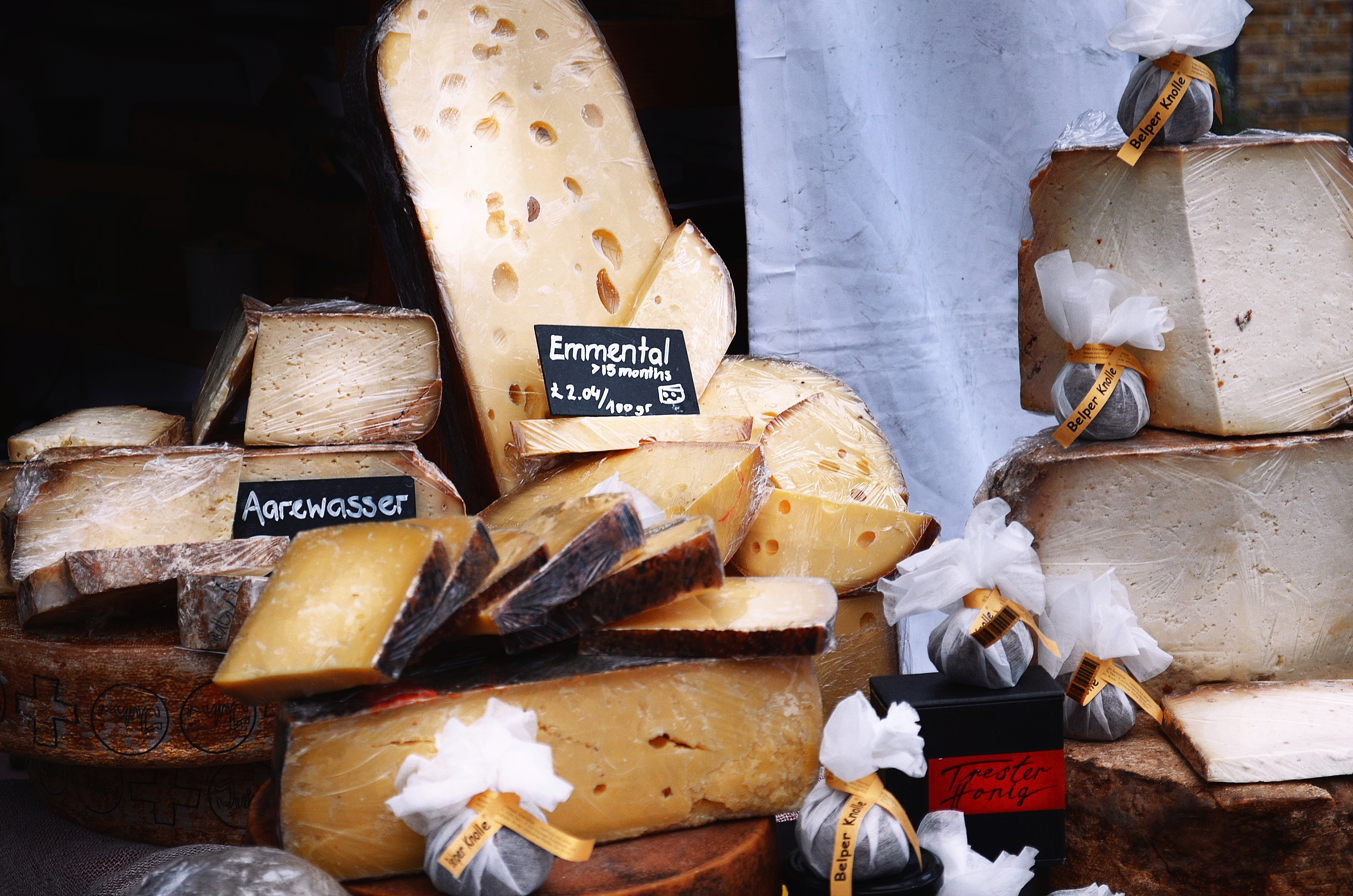
Cheeses

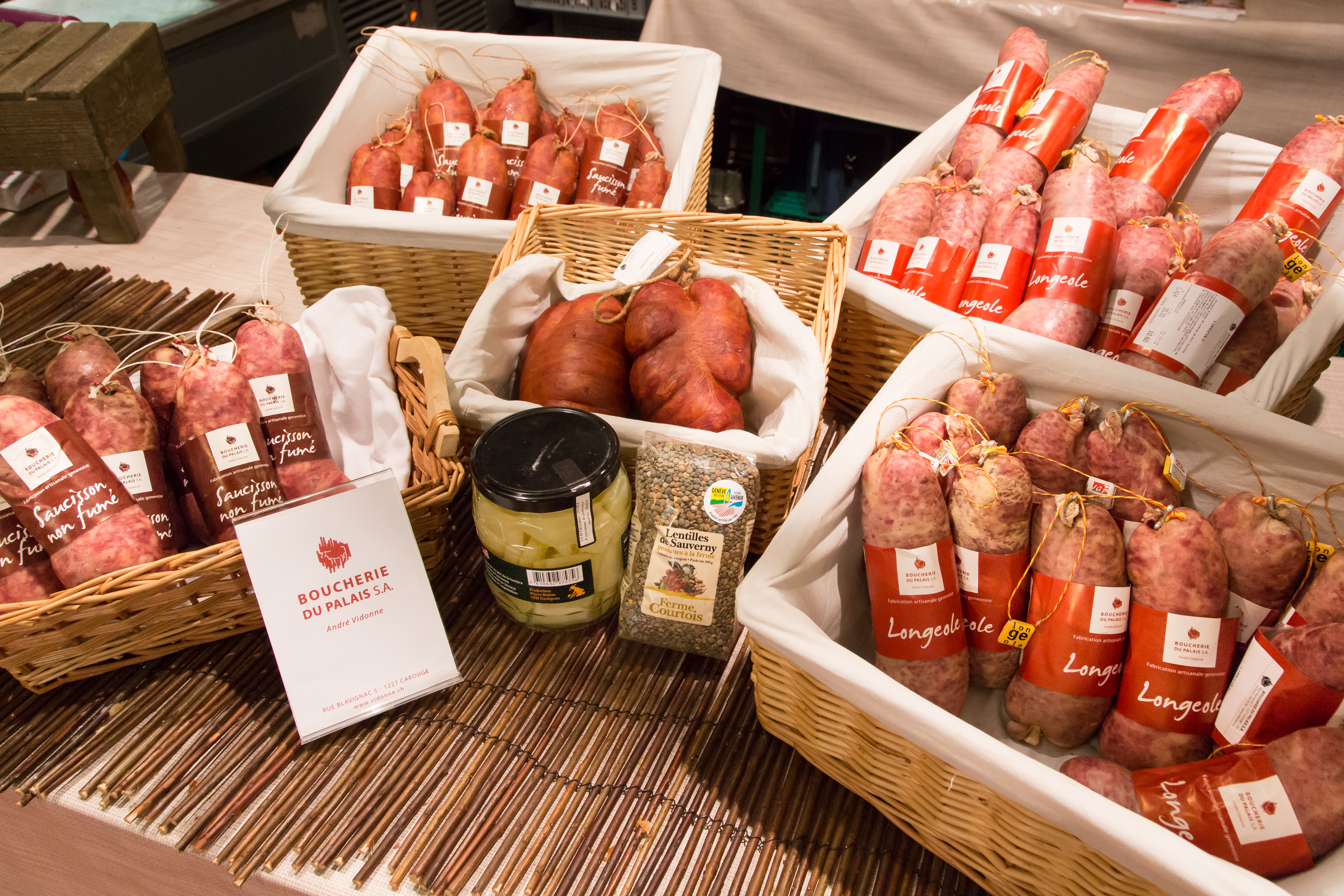
Sausages

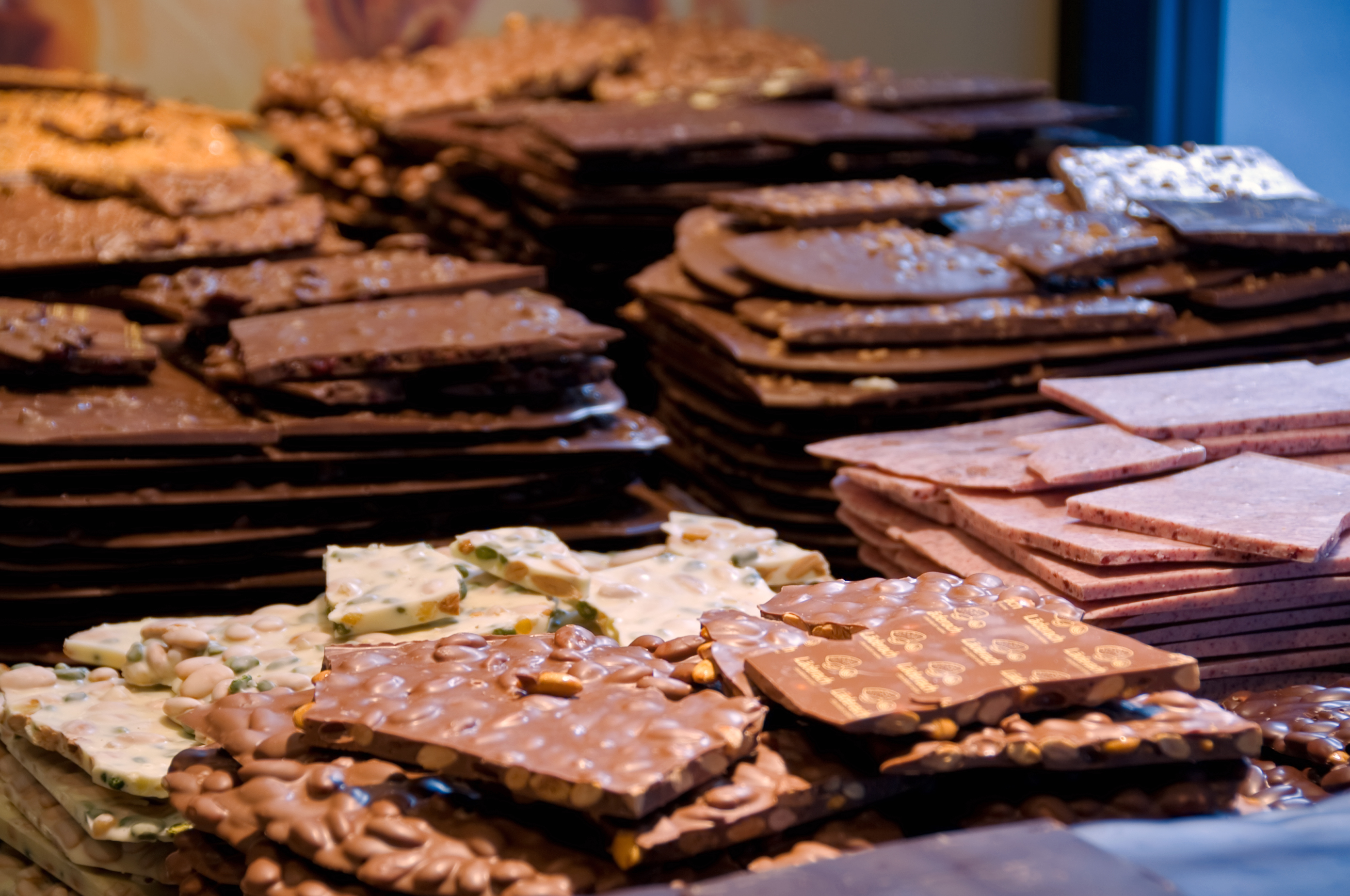
Chocolate

== History ==
The agrarian regions began to specialize toward the end of the Middle Ages, thus developing their own food pattern: in the Alpine regions, breeders fed on dairy products, cheese, nuts, berries, mushrooms, vegetables and fruits; on the Plateau, ploughmen fed on porridge, soups, bread, legumes, vegetables and, from time to time, wine. The diet varied greatly according to the seasons. Fresh garden vegetables gave way in winter to dried fruit and sauerkraut. The occasional famines forced the consumption of more acorns, beets, roots and breads made of substitutes.

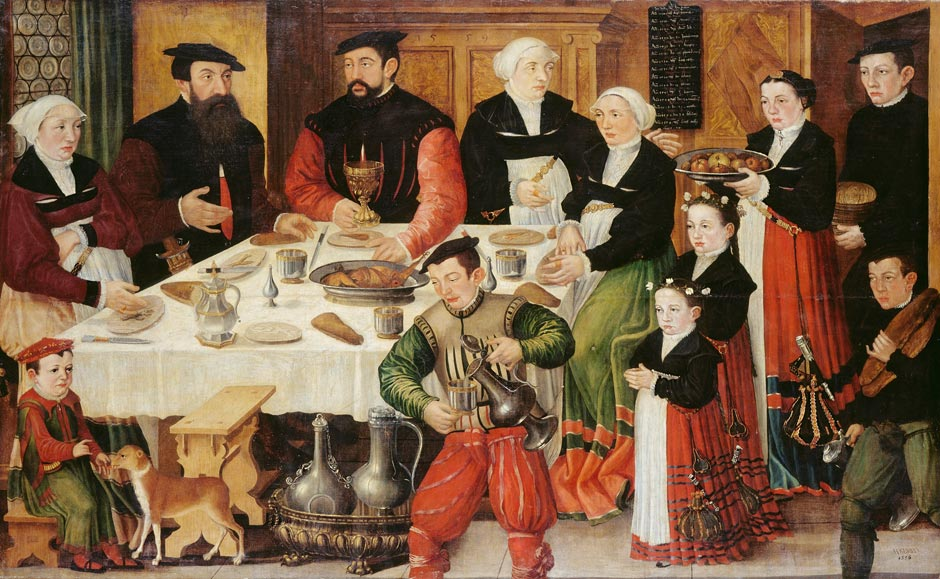
A wealthy Basel family dining. Note the absence of forks and the use of silver cups for wine (1559 painting by Hans Hug Kluber).

The population boom of the early modern period led, while agricultural productivity stagnated, to an impoverishment of the diet (essentially based on porridge) and a decline in meat consumption. The supply was irregular, shortages and high prices frequent. However, the European colonization of the Americas led to the introduction of new food products, such as sugar and various fruits and vegetables. The 18th century finally experienced the food revolution which notably saw the introduction of potato, maize and cocoa. Maize spread to Ticino, the St. Gallen Rhine Valley and a few valleys in Graubünden, which adopted polenta for breakfast. Meanwhile, the potato was adopted as staple food in most regions of the country.

These new crops were not only easier to cultivate in Swiss soil, which made them crucial in combating food insecurity. By the end of the 18th century, local governments and reformers even encouraged potato cultivation as a public health and economic measure. The growing integration of Switzerland into European trade networks also facilitated the circulation of foodstuffs, culinary knowledge, and preserved goods, laying the foundations of modern Swiss gastronomy.

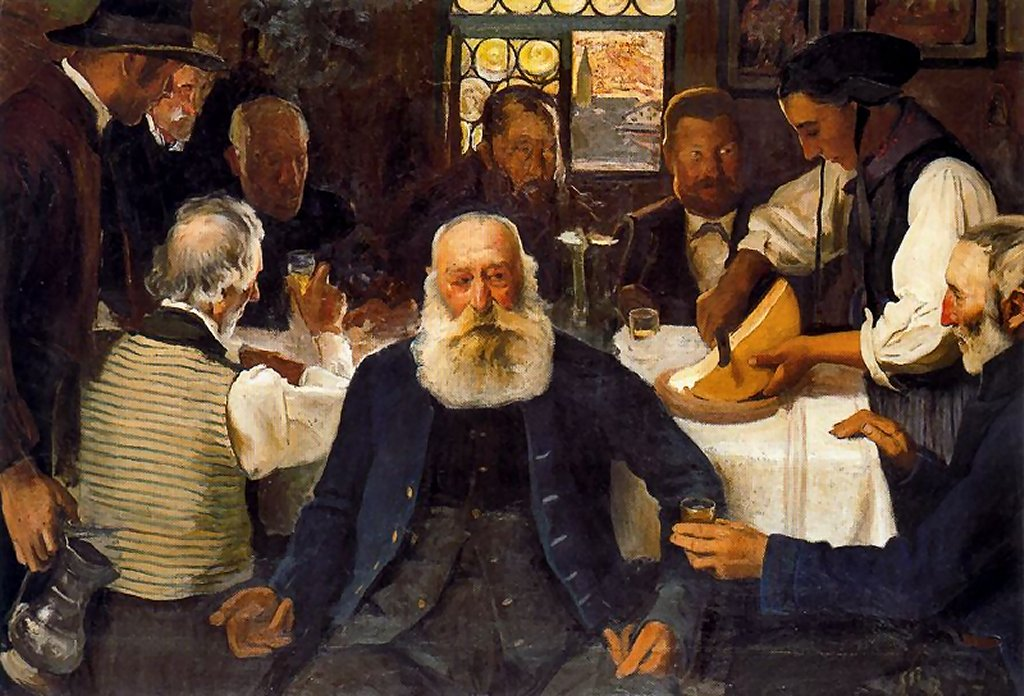
A raclette being served in Valais (1903 painting by Ernest Biéler)

During the 19th century Switzerland experienced industrialisation and increased urbanisation, which began to transform traditional food systems. Railways and improved infrastructure enabled greater distribution of agricultural goods and regional specialities across the country. Urban populations gained access to a wider variety of foods, while rural areas began to produce more for trade than subsistence. The growing food industry saw the rise of major companies such as Nestlé (founded in 1866), which played a pivotal role in developing processed foods like condensed milk and infant formula. At the same time, national pride in local products began to take shape, leading to the formalisation of recipes and the promotion of regional dishes such as fondue and raclette. Culinary schools, cookbooks, and domestic science education also contributed to a more unified but still diverse Swiss food culture. Despite modernisation, traditional farming, and seasonal eating remained important in many areas, particularly in the Alpine regions where artisanal production methods were preserved.

== National dishes ==
A few dishes have become emblematic of Swiss cuisine and highly popular throughout the country. All of them have also become popular outside Switzerland's borders.

=== Muesli ===
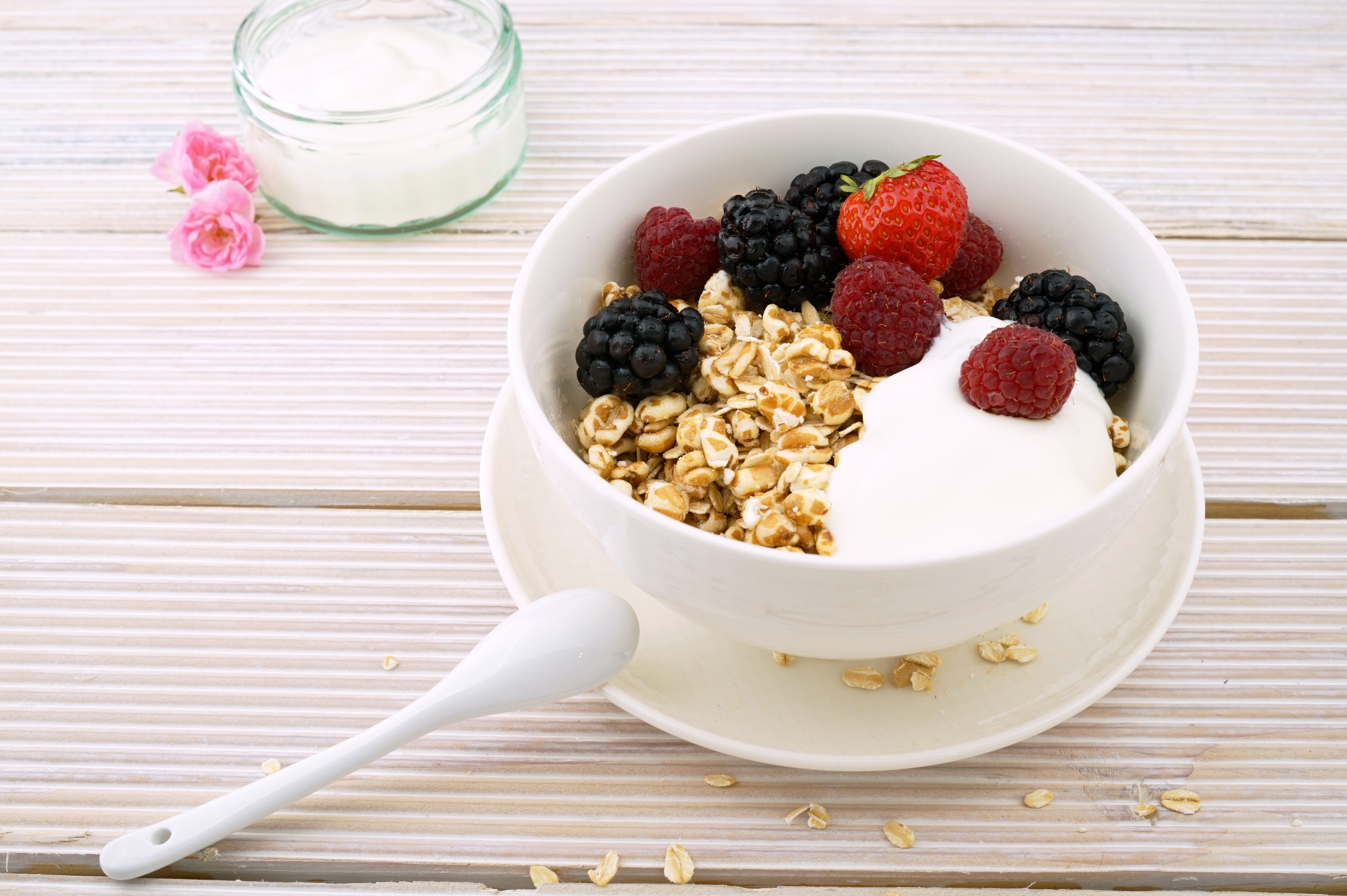
Muesli with berries

Muesli, known in Switzerland as Birchermüesli, is a breakfast or snack consisting of cereal (oat) flakes, chopped fruit and milk. There are many ways of making a muesli, for example with honey, yoghurt and nuts. Muesli was created by the Swiss nutritionist Max Bircher-Benner in the early 20th century. His 'apple diet dish', developed as part of a raw food diet, was originally served to sanatorium patients as an easily digestible evening meal. After the Second World War, muesli became very popular throughout Switzerland thanks to home cooking courses and being served to the armed forces. Nowadays muesli is a staple in Western breakfast culture and is especially popular among athletes as a nutritional supplement.

=== Rösti ===
Rösti is a kind of fried potato cake served as a main course or side dish. As a main dish, rösti is usually accompanied with cheese, onions and cold meat or eggs. This dish, originally from Zürich, was first simply made by frying grated raw potatoes in a pan. It has then spread towards Bern where it is made with boiled potatoes instead. This is where it took the name Rösti. There are many variants in Switzerland and outside the borders. This culinary specialty gives its name to the Röstigraben, which designates the cultural differences between the German- and French-speaking parts of the country.

=== Fondue and raclette ===
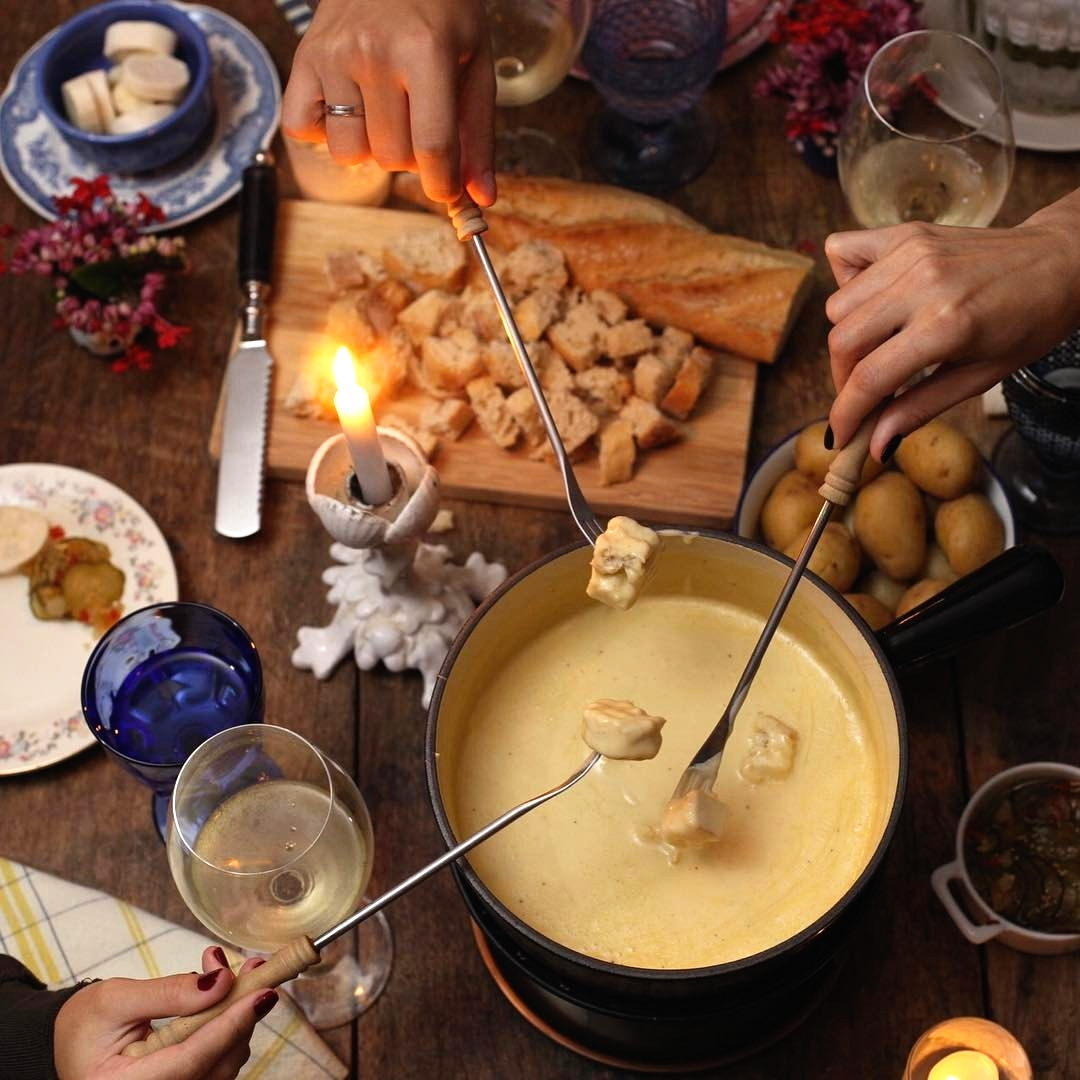
Fondue

Fondue is a dish of usually several hard cheeses, such as Gruyère and Vacherin, which are melted with white wine and eaten hot with bread. It is served in a caquelon in which each guest dips their piece of bread using a special fork. At the base of the fondue pot is the heat source (stove or candles). Fondue was first described in 1699 in a Zürich manuscript by Albert Hauser. It is entitled To cook cheese with wine and resembles the recipe of today. Fondue was also promoted by the Swiss Cheese Union in the early 20th century. Today, it is often considered to be the national dish.

Raclette is also a dish of melted cheese, originating from Valais. Traditionally, half a cheese wheel is heated on the cut side and, as it melts, the cheese is scraped off onto a plate. Now, this is often performed using an electric appliance. Raclette is served with skin-on potatoes and mixed pickles, and often accompanied by Fendant as a drink. Melting cheese in front of a fire is attested in the 16th century. Since 1875, the French term raclette is commonly used for this dish. At the 1909 Cantonal Exhibition of Sion, raclette was promoted as a national dish of Valais. Raclette eventually gained national (and international) popularity from the 1964 National Exhibition.

Contrary to muesli and rösti, fondue and raclette are not meant to be staple foods, but rather convivial dishes intended for special occasions. Both fondue and raclette are especially popular during cold weather and have become associated with mountain culture and winter sports.

== Regional cuisine ==
=== From the German-speaking part of Switzerland ===
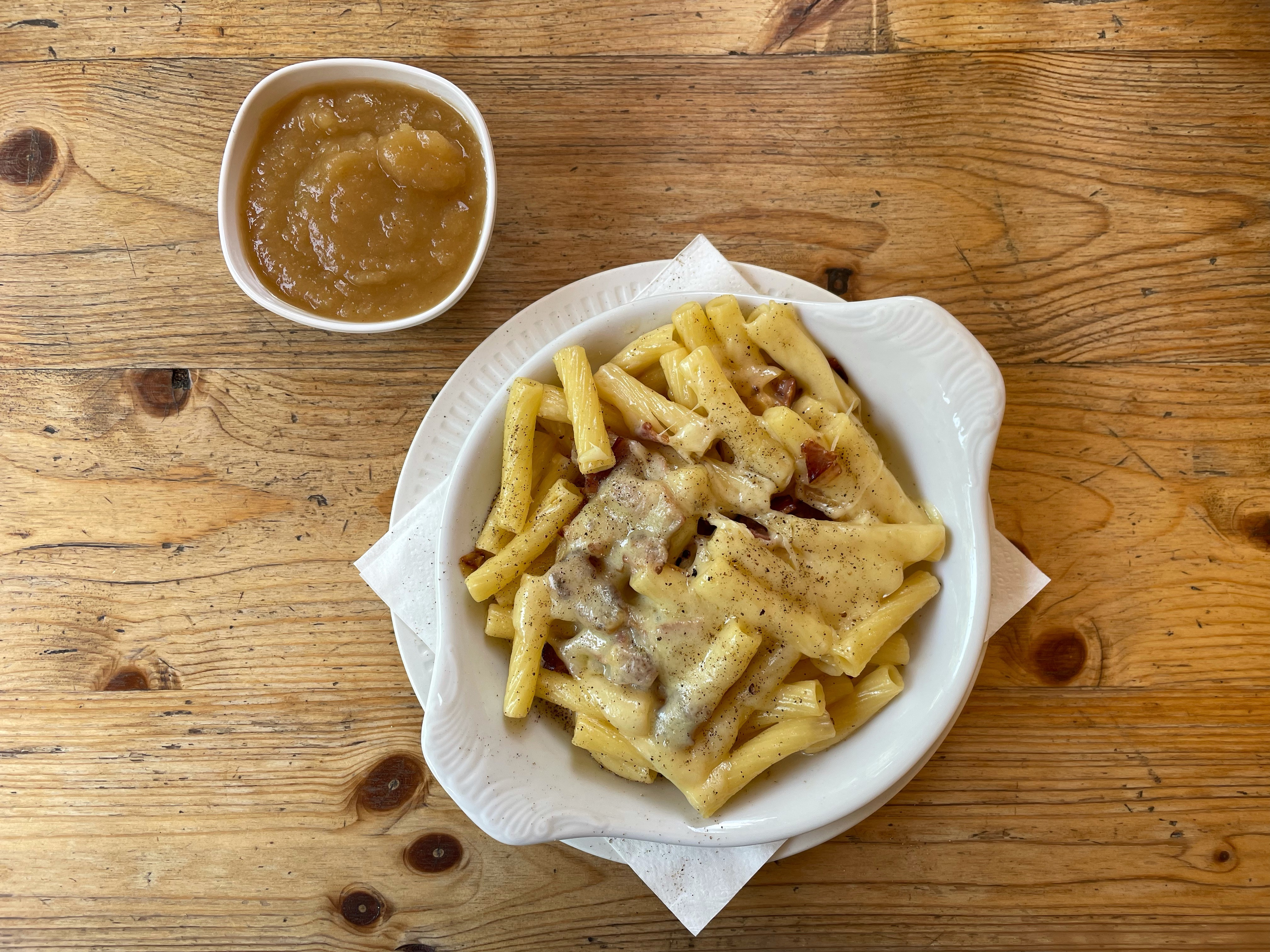
Älplermagronen

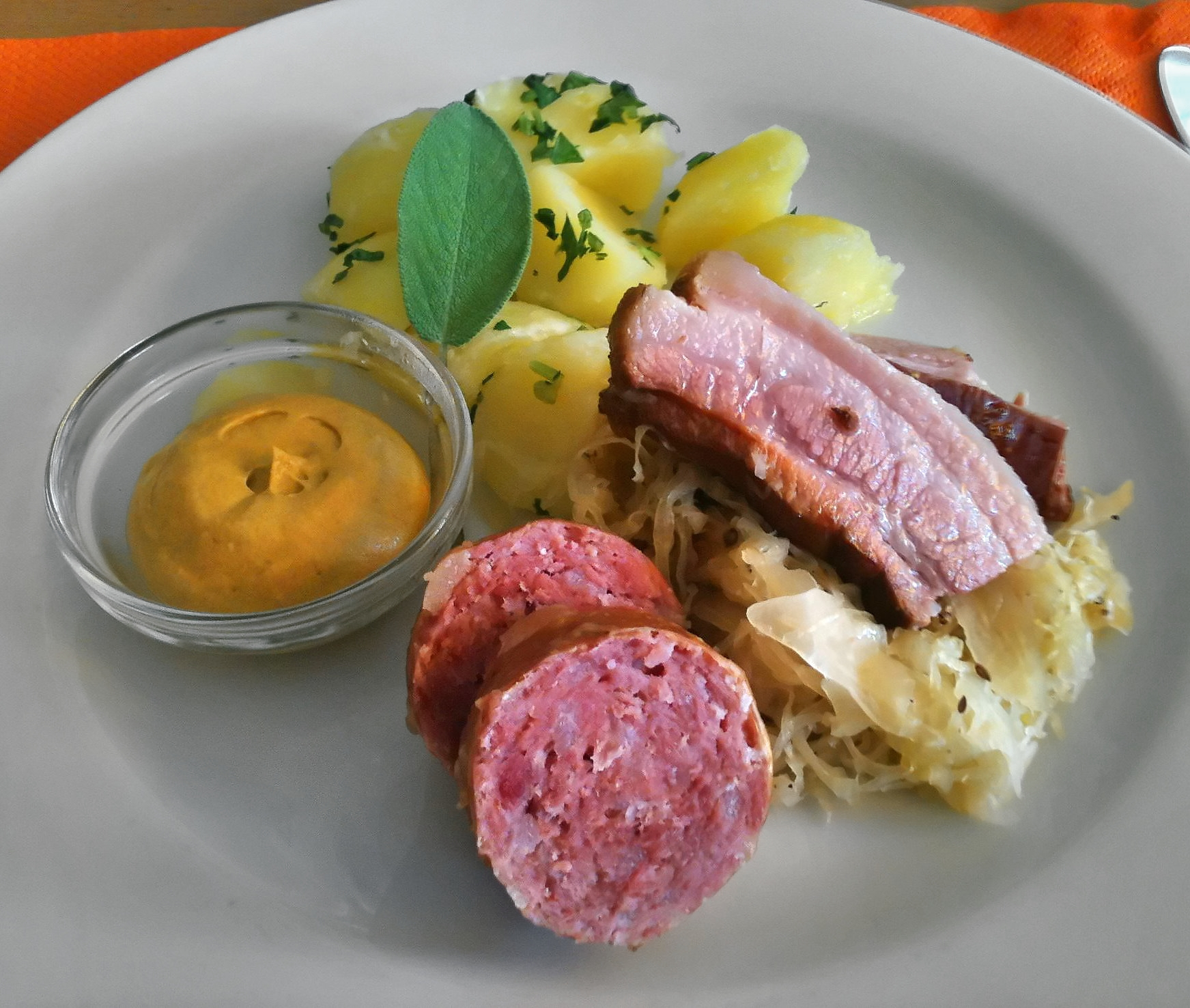
Berner Platte

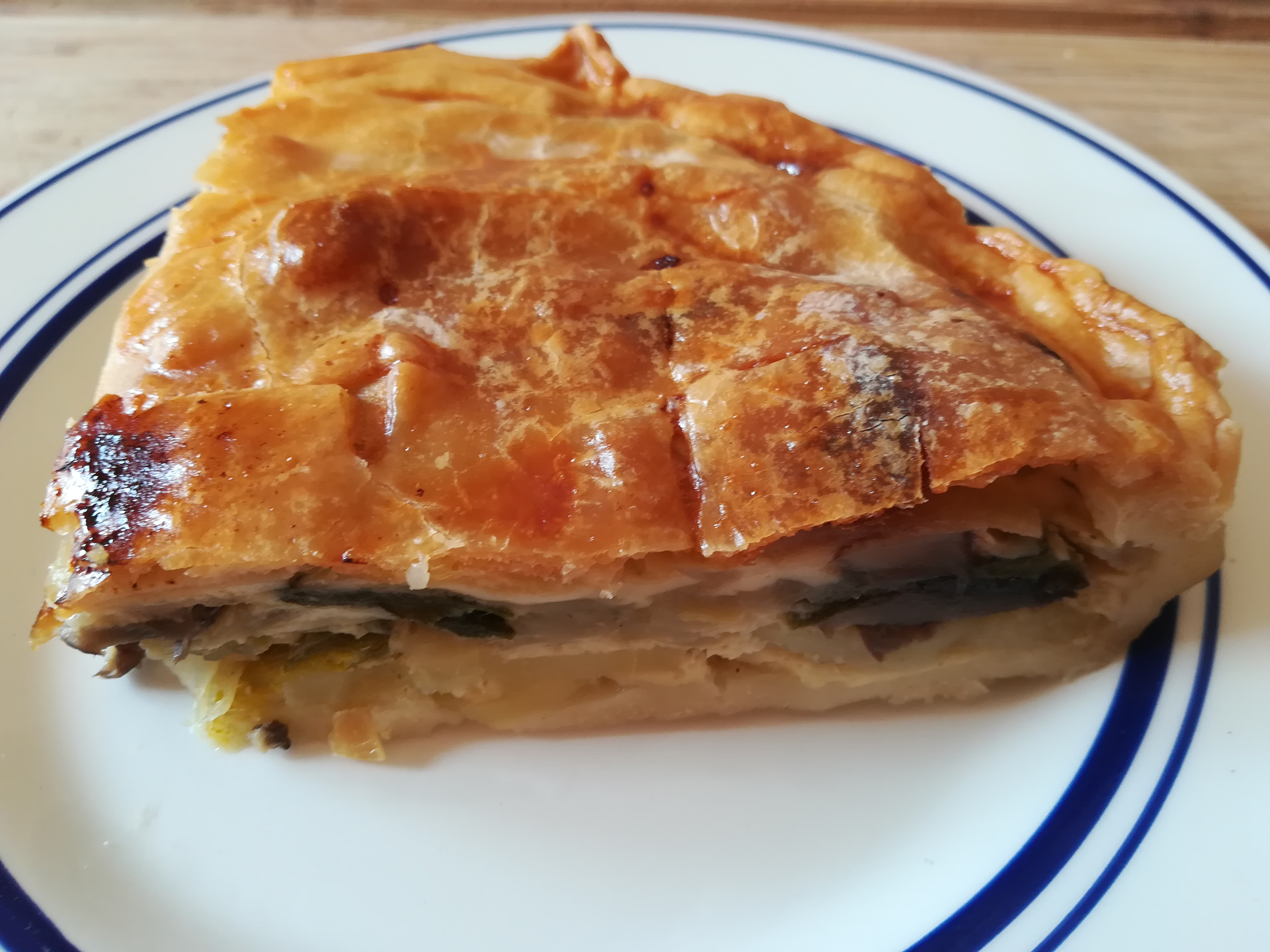
Cholera

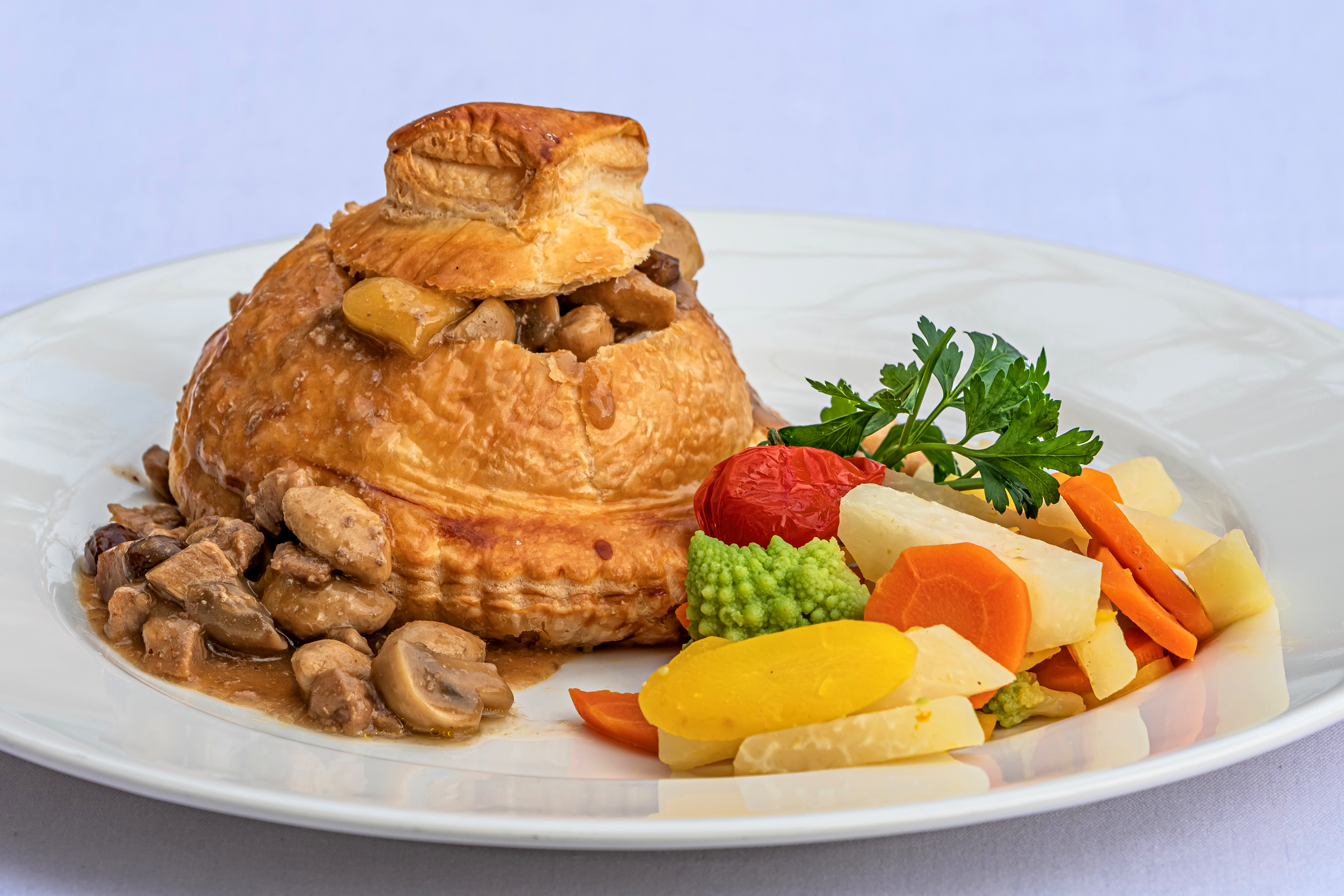
Luzerner Chügelipastete

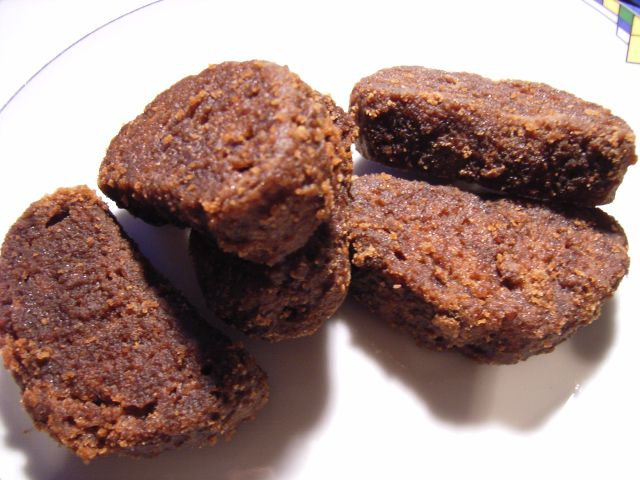
Magenbrot

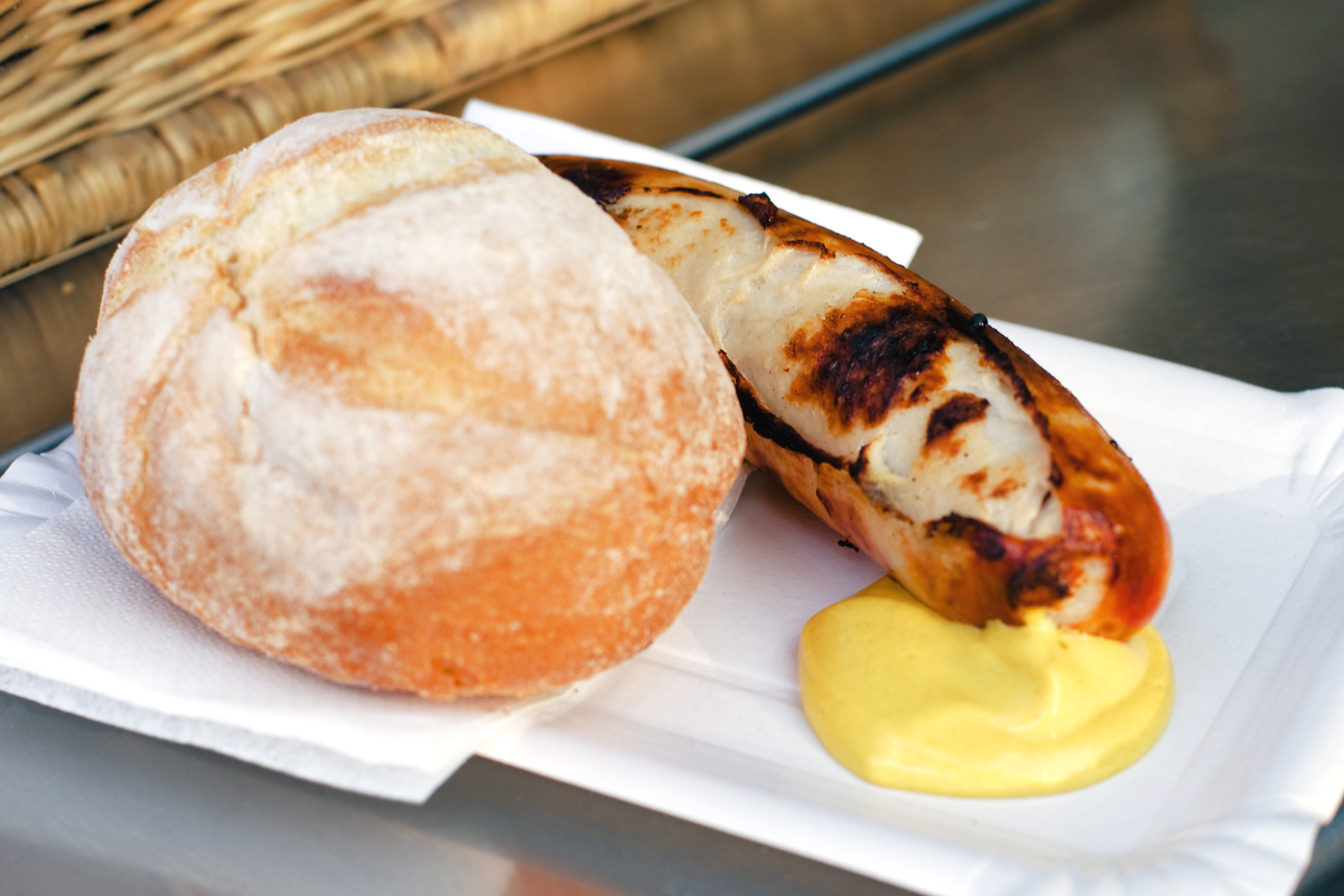
Grilled veal sausage as street food

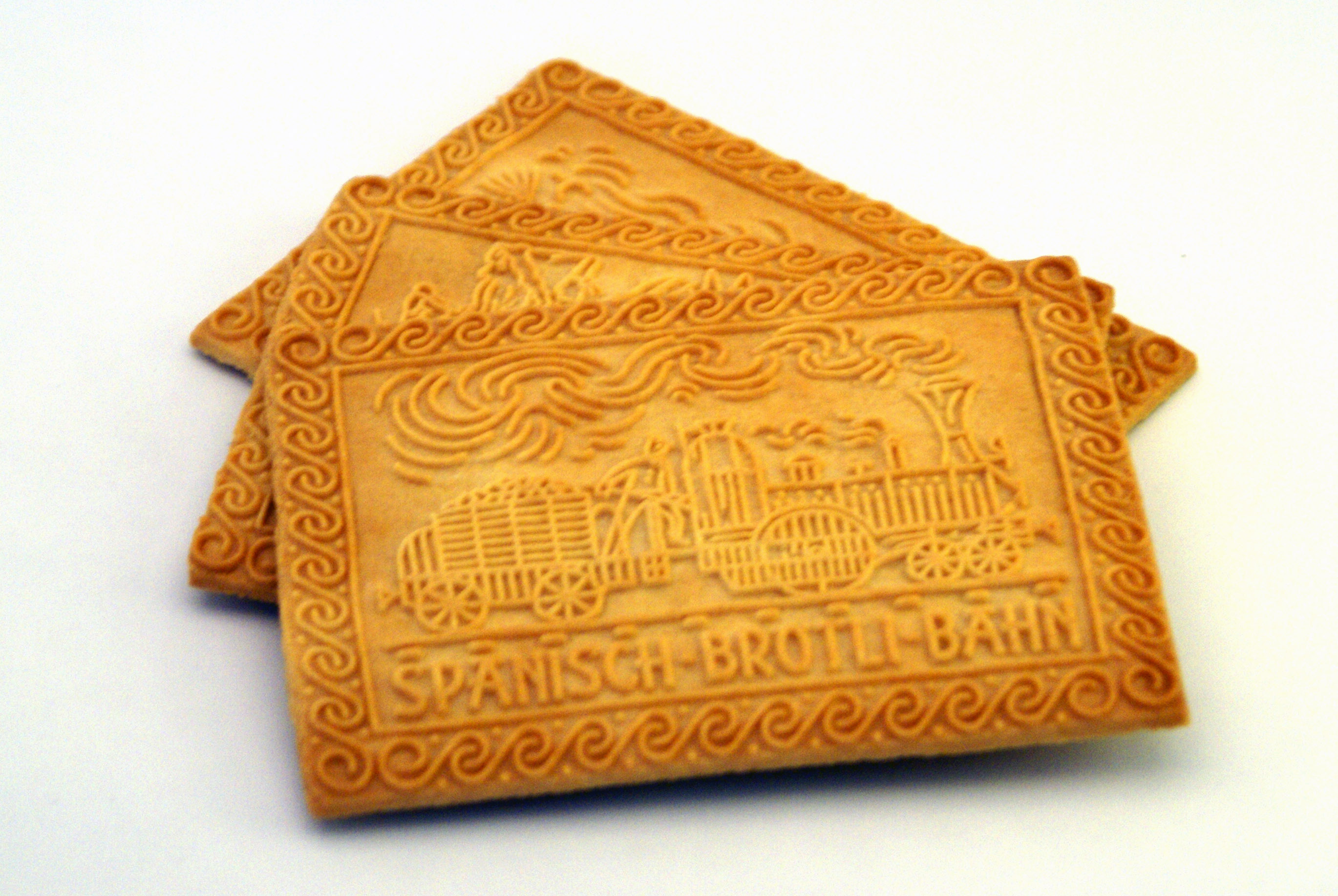
Tirggel

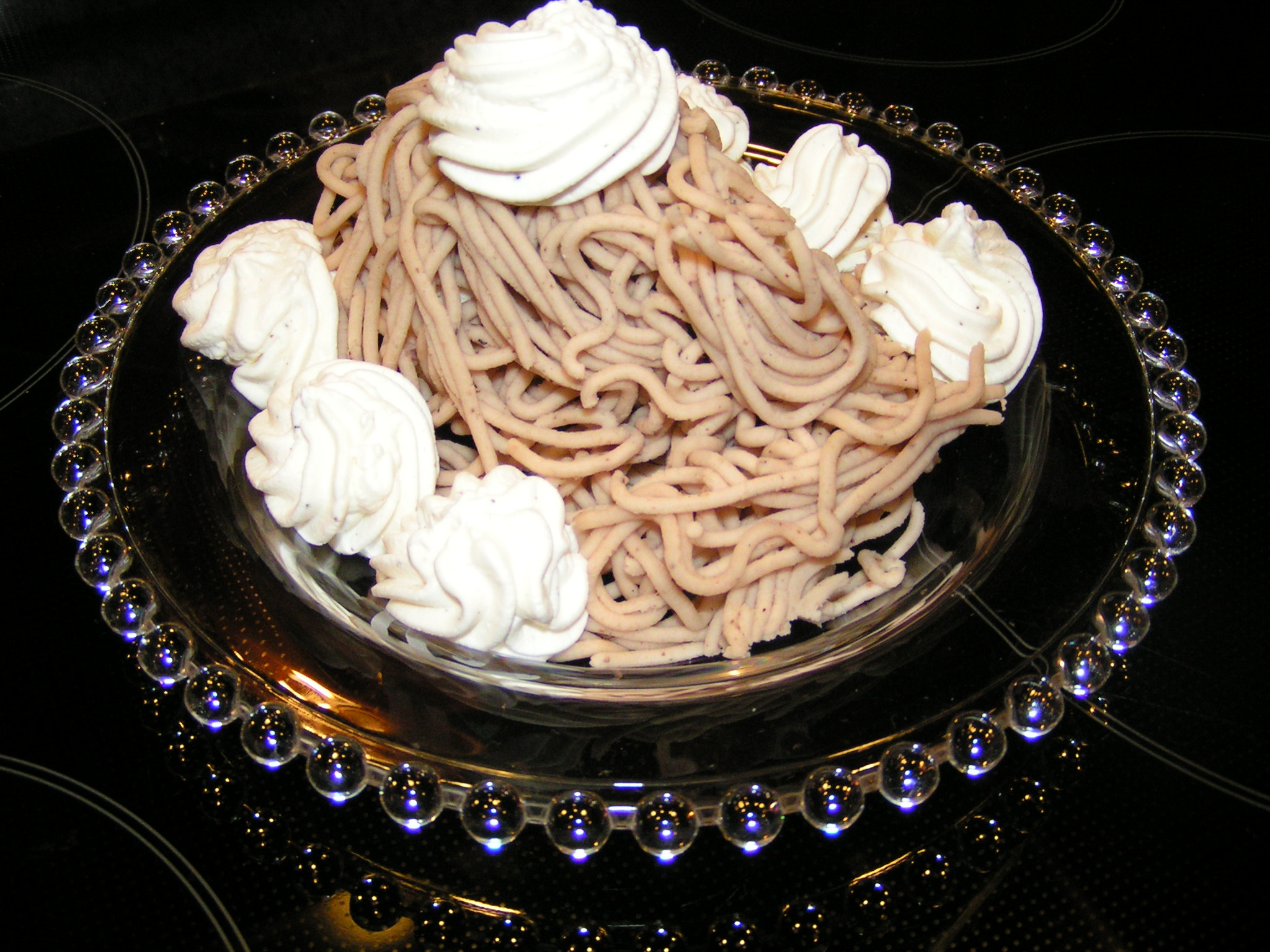
Vermicelles

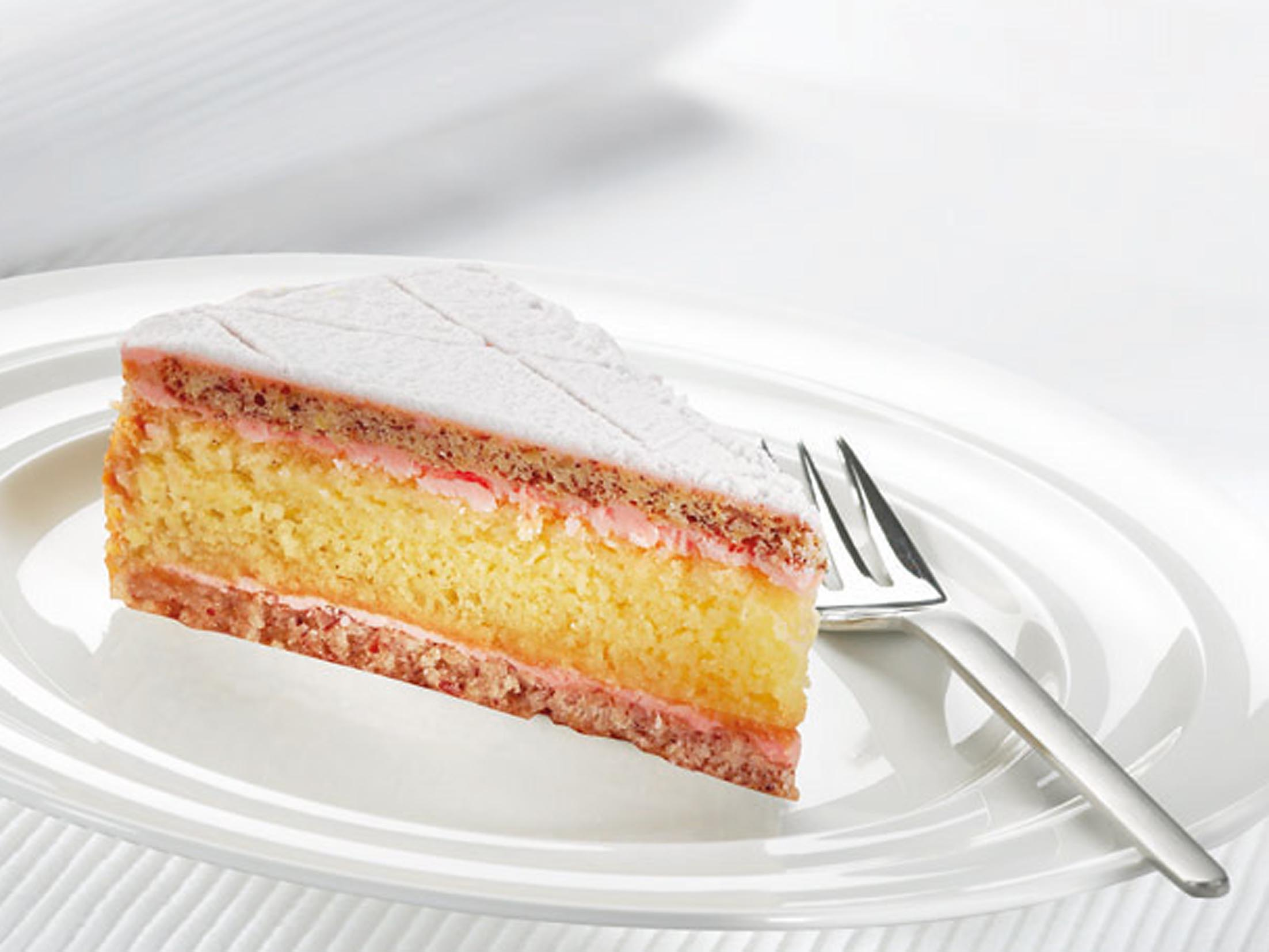
Zuger Kirschtorte

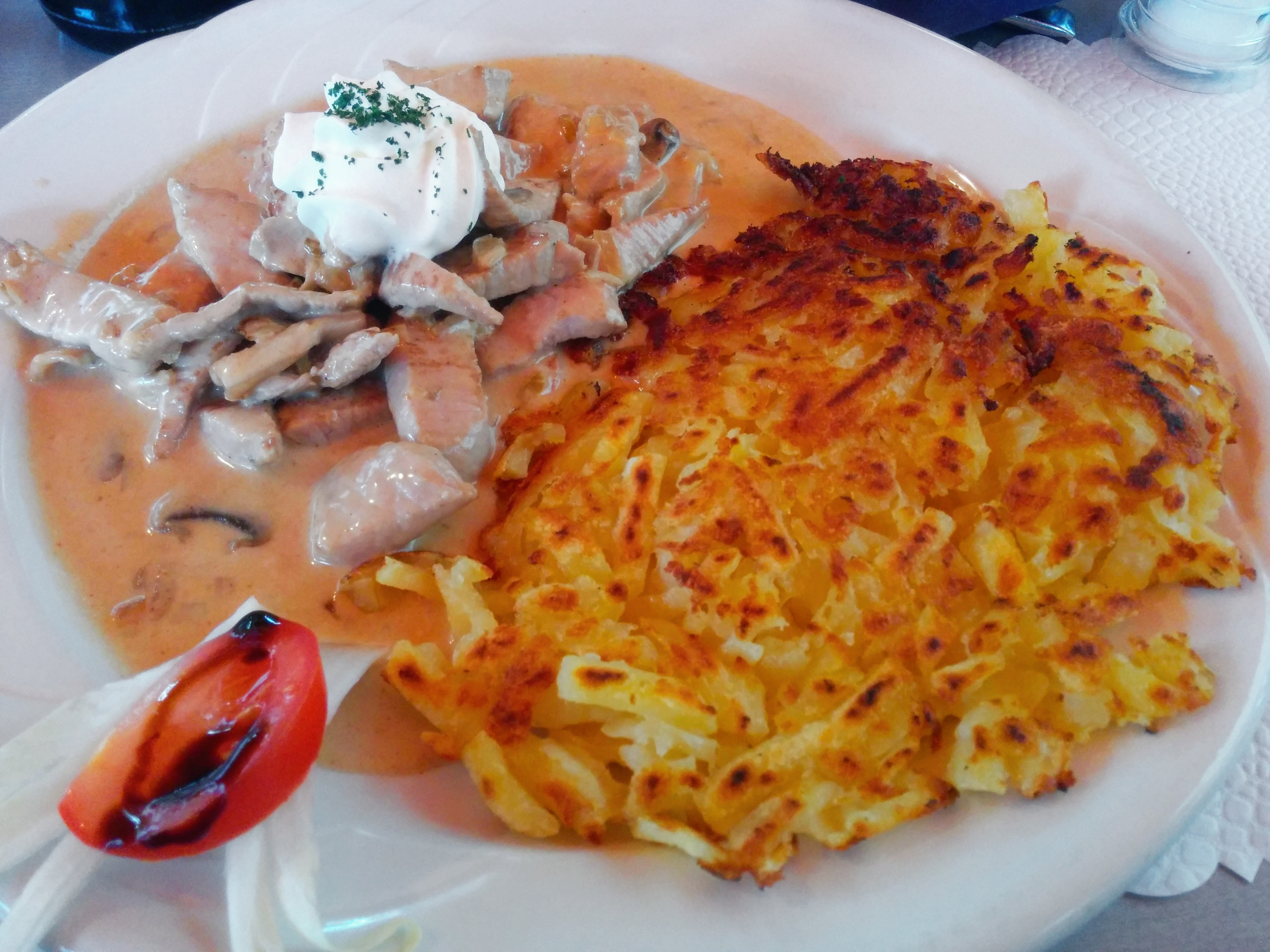
Zürcher Geschnetzeltes with rösti

- Aargauer Rüblitorte mit Zitronenzuckerguss (AG): Carrot cake, a baked sponge cake made of nuts and carrots. Often spread with a glaze made out of powdered sugar and lemon juice, and decorated with small carrots made of marzipan.
- Älplermagronen (Alpine herdsman's macaroni): This dish is a frugal all-in-one dish making use of the ingredients the herdsmen had at hand in their alpine cottages: macaroni, potatoes, onions, small pieces of bacon, and melted cheese. Traditionally Älplermagronen is served with applesauce instead of vegetables or salad.
- Appenzeller Käsefladen: The Appenzeller cheese tart, also called Chäsflade, is made with either a bread dough or a yeast dough. The topping consists of Appenzeller cheese, finely chopped onions, eggs, cream and milk, spices to taste.
- Appenzeller Mostbröckli
- Basler Mehlsuppe (BS): In Basel, flour soup has been eaten early in the morning of carnival since the 19th century. Flour is roasted dark and deglazed with broth. Often served with grated cheese.
- Basler Käsewähe (BS)
- Basler Läckerli
- Bauernbrot
- Berner Platte (BE)
- Berner Rösti (BE)
- Berner Lebkuchen (BE)
- Biber(li) (Appenzell): The Biber is a gingerbread specialty from the Appenzellerland. The large Biber, the actual Biberfladen, contain natural honey and are unfilled. Smaller Biber, called Biberli, are filled with an almond paste.
- Bündner Nusstorte (GR)
- Cholera (VS)
- Cholermus (OW)
- Cordon bleu
- Emmental apple Rösti (German: Emmentaler Apfelrösti: Made from old bread, apple, and sugar, this used to be a very popular sweet dish made from leftovers, since the ingredients were usually at hand and the preparation is very simple. The recipe comes from the Emmental ("Emmen Valley") in the canton of Bern, the home of the famous Emmentaler cheese.
- Fotzelschnitten: A variant of French toast. The exact origin of the name remains unclear (literally, Fotzel means "torn-off scrap of paper").
- Fasnachtschüechli: Deep fried dough disks, often sprinkled with powdered sugar. Traditionally served at the carnival season.
- Fastenwähe (BS)
- Fleischvogel
- Gehacktes mit Hörnli: Minced meat in either tomato- or brown sauce, served over small elbow macaroni, usually with apple mesh on the side.
- Glarner Birnbrot (GL): Pear bread is a traditional pastry from the Swiss Alps and foothills of the Alps with a filling of dried pears. Besides pears, the filling contains raisins, tree nuts and often figs and dried apple slices. It is spiced with candied orange peel, candied lemon peel, coriander, cinnamon, star anise, anise, and cloves, as well as with marc, kirsch, or wine.
- Gnottene/Gottus (VS)
- Innerschweizer Chäs-Chueche (Central Switzerland)
- Innerschweizer Hafechabis, a stew of lamb/pork/beef and cabbage, served with potatoes. (Central Switzerland)
- Innerschweizer Zigerkrapfen (Central Switzerland)
- Kalberwurst (GL): A sausage with a distinctive, creamy flavor that originated in the canton of Glarus, kalberwurst is made with veal, milk, ground crackers, and mild spices. It has a smooth texture and mild taste, and although most sausages are smoked, kalberwurst is not. It is often cooked with onions and gravy.
- Kappeler Milchsuppe: The so-called 'Kappel milk soup' is at the center of an important event in the history of Switzerland. In 1529, Zürich troops marched against the central Swiss cantons. According to the reports, the common foot people of the two armies took advantage of the time when the leaders were negotiating to fraternize and placed a large cooking pot on a fire in Kappel am Albis, exactly on the border between the two cantons. The Zugers are said to have contributed the milk and the Zürichers the bread for a milk soup, which was then eaten together by both armies.
- Landjäger: A semi-dried sausage traditionally made in Switzerland, but also in Southern Germany, Austria, and Alsace. It is popular as a snack food during activities such as hiking. It also has a history as soldier's food because it keeps without refrigeration and comes in single-meal portions. Landjäger tastes similar to dried salami.
- Luzerner Birrenbrot (LU)
- Luzerner Chügelipastete (LU): Lucerne Chügelipastete is a regional pastry dish from Lucerne. The name is derived from the spherical shape (Chügeli = little balls) of most of the ingredients used. Oldest mentions of the dish date back to the 18th century. The basic form consists of a puff pastry filled with a ragout of meat, mushrooms and raisins.
- Luzerner Lebkuchen (LU)
- Magenbrot (BS)
- Meitschibei (BE)
- Meringue (Meiringen)
- Neuenburger Wurst im Schlafrock (NE)
- Nüsslisalat
- Nussstängeli: (nut sticks) a Swiss hazelnut pastry, ideal for dunking in a hot coffee.
- Osterfladen
- Rahmschnitzel
- Riz Casimir is a preparation of rice with curry sauce and minced pork blended with tropical fruits: pineapple, banana and cherries, sometimes with currant grape. It was first served in 1952 by the international chain of hotel and resorts Mövenpick.
- Nidelwähe: Similar to the 'Wähen' (Swiss tarts), these are flat, round cakes with little dough. However, these tarts are filled with a mildly sweet and creamy filling of thick cream, which in Switzerland is called nidle or nidel, depending on the region.
- Nidwaldner Lebkuchen (NW)
- Ribel (Rheintal) (SG)
- Schenkele
- Schinkengipfeli(i): Popular small ham croissants, consisting of a ham mousse filling and puff pastry.
- Schwyzer Krapfen (SZ)
- Spätzli, small dumplings made with flour, eggs and water
- St. Galler (Kalbs)bratwurst (SG), veal sausage
- St. Galler Brot (SG)
- St. Galler Schüblig (SG)
- Suuri Lääberli (BS)
- Tirggel (ZH) are traditional Christmas biscuits from Zürich. Made from flour and honey, they are thin, hard, and sweet.
- Vermicelles
- Wähe/Kuchen/Dünnen/Fladen/Gateau
- Walliser Roggenbrot (VS)
- Schweizer Wurstsalat
- Wurzelbrot
- Zibelechueche (BE)
- Zopf (known as tresse in French and treccia in Italian) is a traditional Swiss bread known for its characteristic braided shape and golden crust. Made from white flour, milk, butter, yeast, and a pinch of sugar and salt, the dough is typically brushed with egg yolk before baking, giving it a shiny, rich finish. Zopf is usually enjoyed on Sunday mornings and holidays, often served with butter, jam, cheese, or honey as part of a leisurely breakfast or brunch. The name "Zopf" means "braid" in German, referring to the plaited form of the loaf. The bread's soft, slightly sweet crumb and decorative appearance have made it a beloved staple of Swiss culinary tradition, symbolizing comfort, family gatherings, and festive occasions.
- Zuger Kirschtorte (ZG)
- Zürcher Geschnetzeltes ("sliced meat Zurich style") is a traditional dish originating from the canton of Zurich. It typically consists of thinly sliced veal cooked in a creamy white wine and demiglace sauce, often enriched with onions and mushrooms. The dish is renowned for its tender texture and rich, savory flavor, reflecting the refined culinary influences of urban Swiss cuisine. Zürcher Geschnetzeltes is most commonly served with rösti, the iconic Swiss potato dish, but it can also accompany pasta or rice. First recorded in printed form in the 1940s, the recipe is believed to have evolved from earlier meat stews, with its current form emphasizing simplicity and high-quality local ingredients. Today, it is considered one of Switzerland's national dishes and is a staple in both home cooking and restaurant menus across the country.

=== From the French-speaking part of Switzerland ===
- Brisolée (VS): roasted chestnuts served in autumn with local cheeses and meats
- Carac: A distinctively green-colored chocolate and shortcrust pastry
- Filets de perche: Perch fillets, often prepared in the "meunière" style, i.e. coated in flour and fried in butter
- Gâteau bullois: A walnut pie (comparable to the Bündner Nusstorte) with chocolate
- Malakoff: Fried cheese balls or sticks from the region of la Côte in the canton of Vaud.
- Meringue: A dessert made of whipped egg whites, traditionally accompanied by double Gruyère cream
- Papet Vaudois: the canton of Vaud is home to this filling dish of leeks and potatoes. It is usually served with saucisse au chou (cabbage sausage).
- Longeole: A sausage from the Canton of Geneva made of pork and filled with fennel seeds.
- Cardon argenté épineux genevois: This cardoon is only grown in the Canton of Geneva. Its origins come from Huguenot refugees from the south of France, and adapted to the colder climate of Geneva. It is part of Christmas festivities in many Geneva households, often eaten in the form of a gratin.
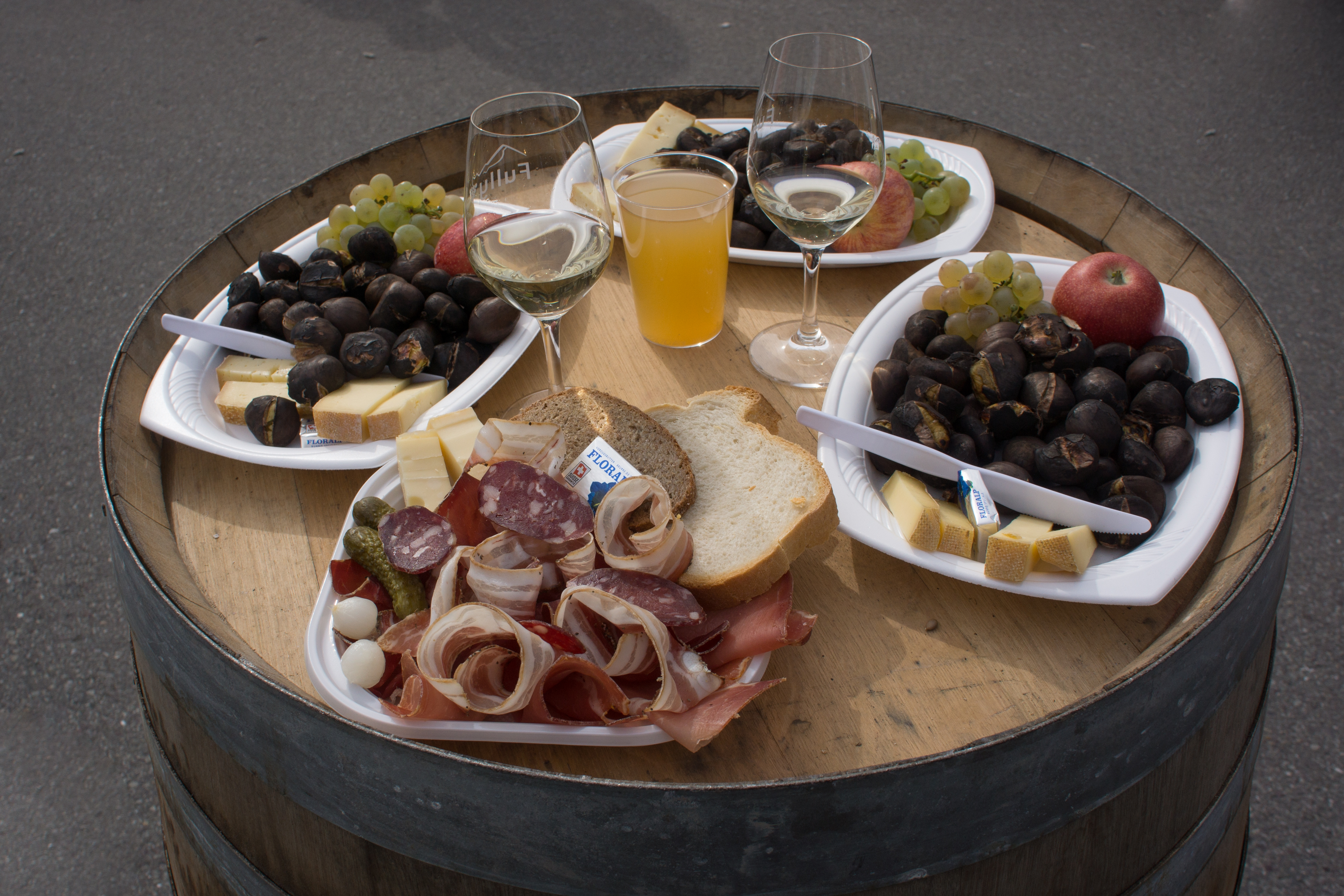
Brisolée

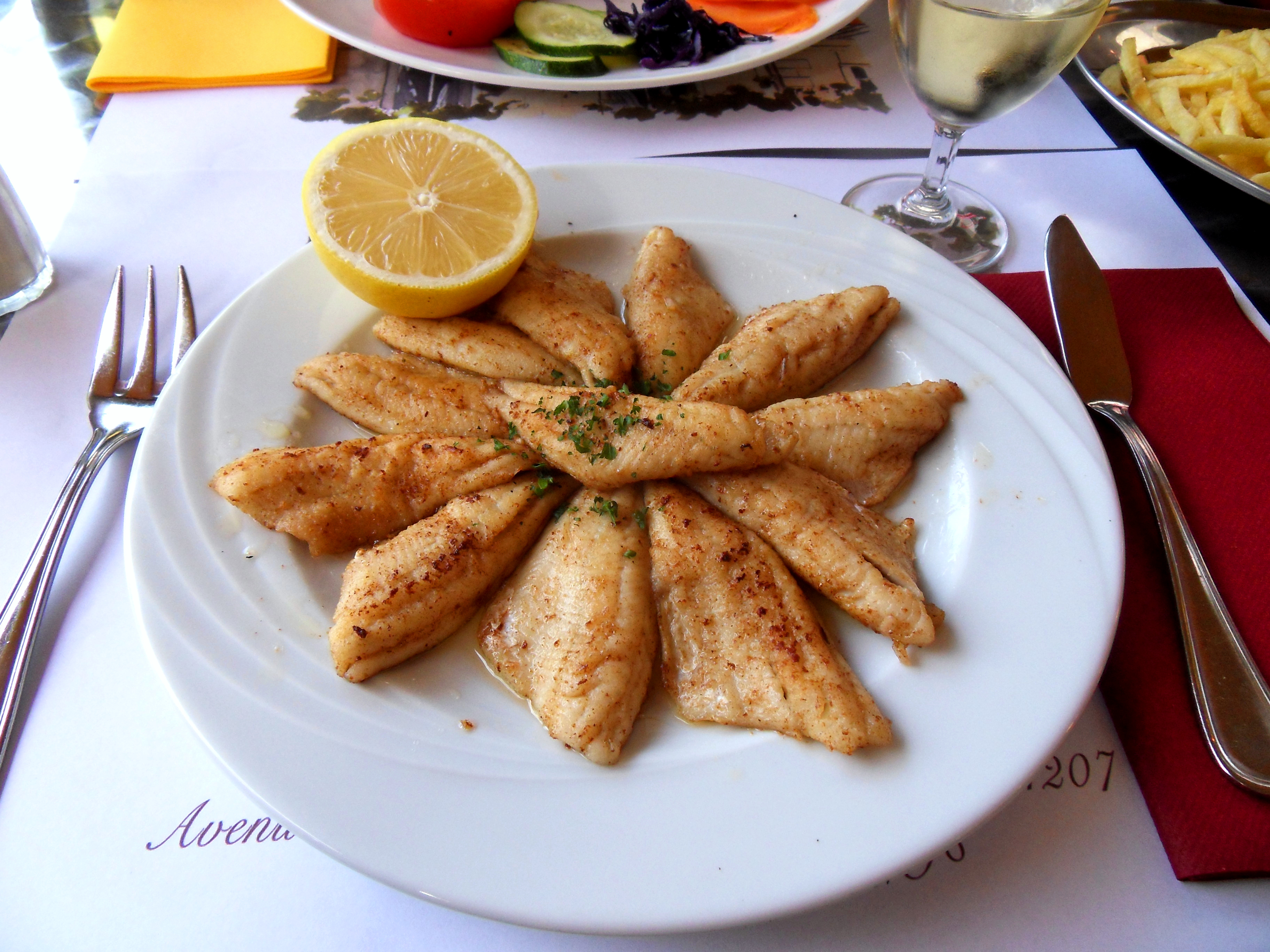
Filets de perche

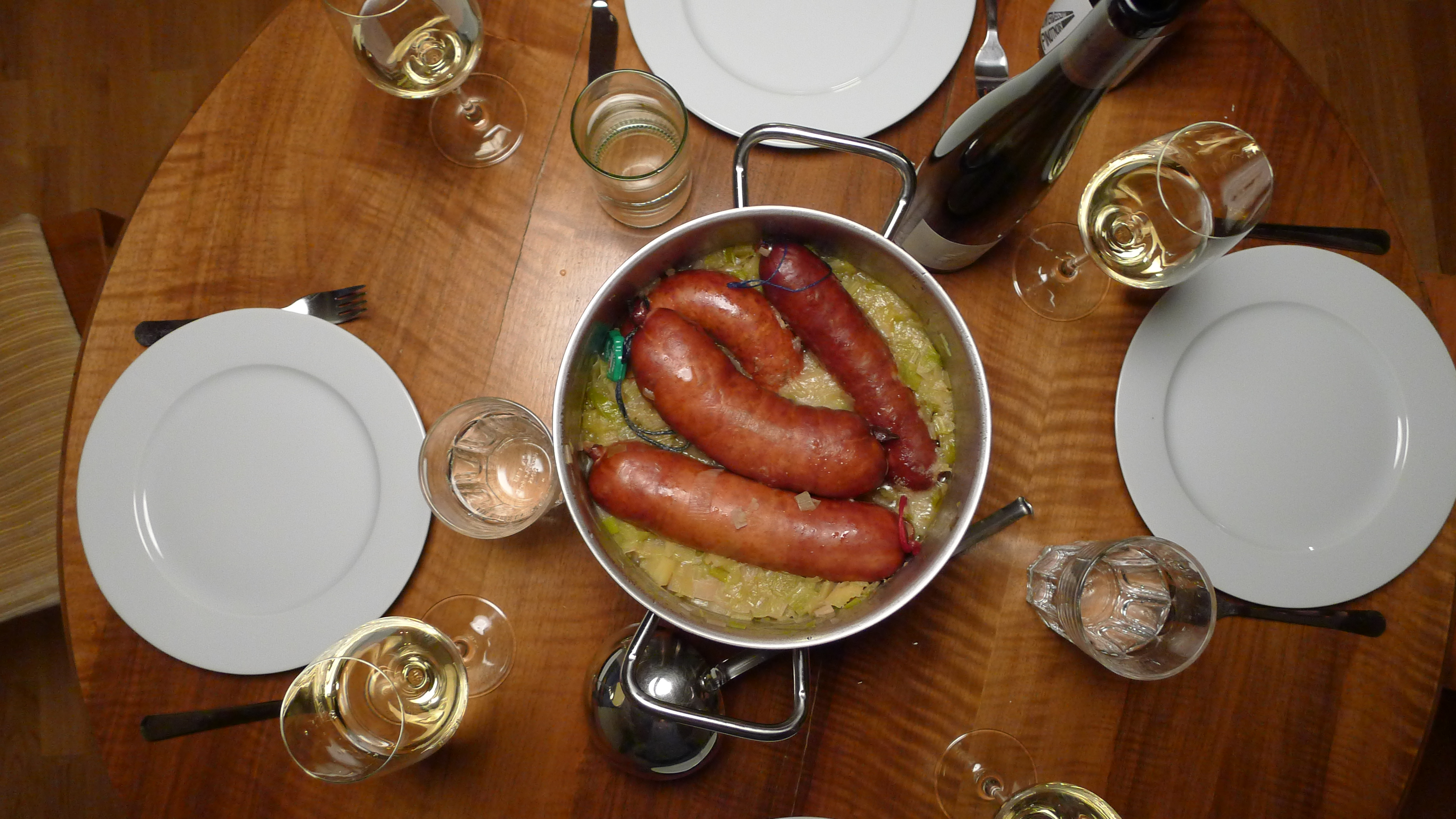
Papet Vaudois

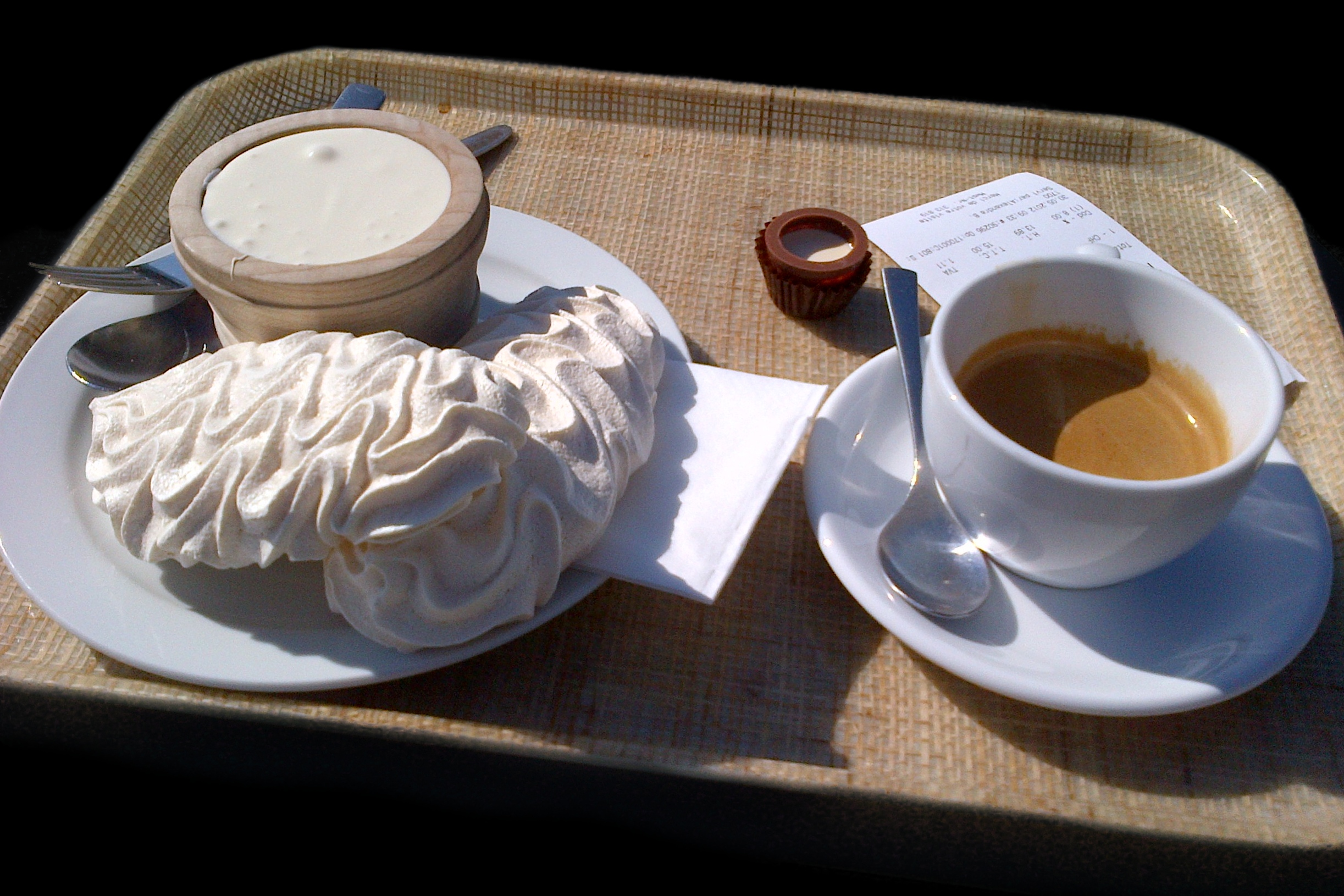
Meringue with double cream

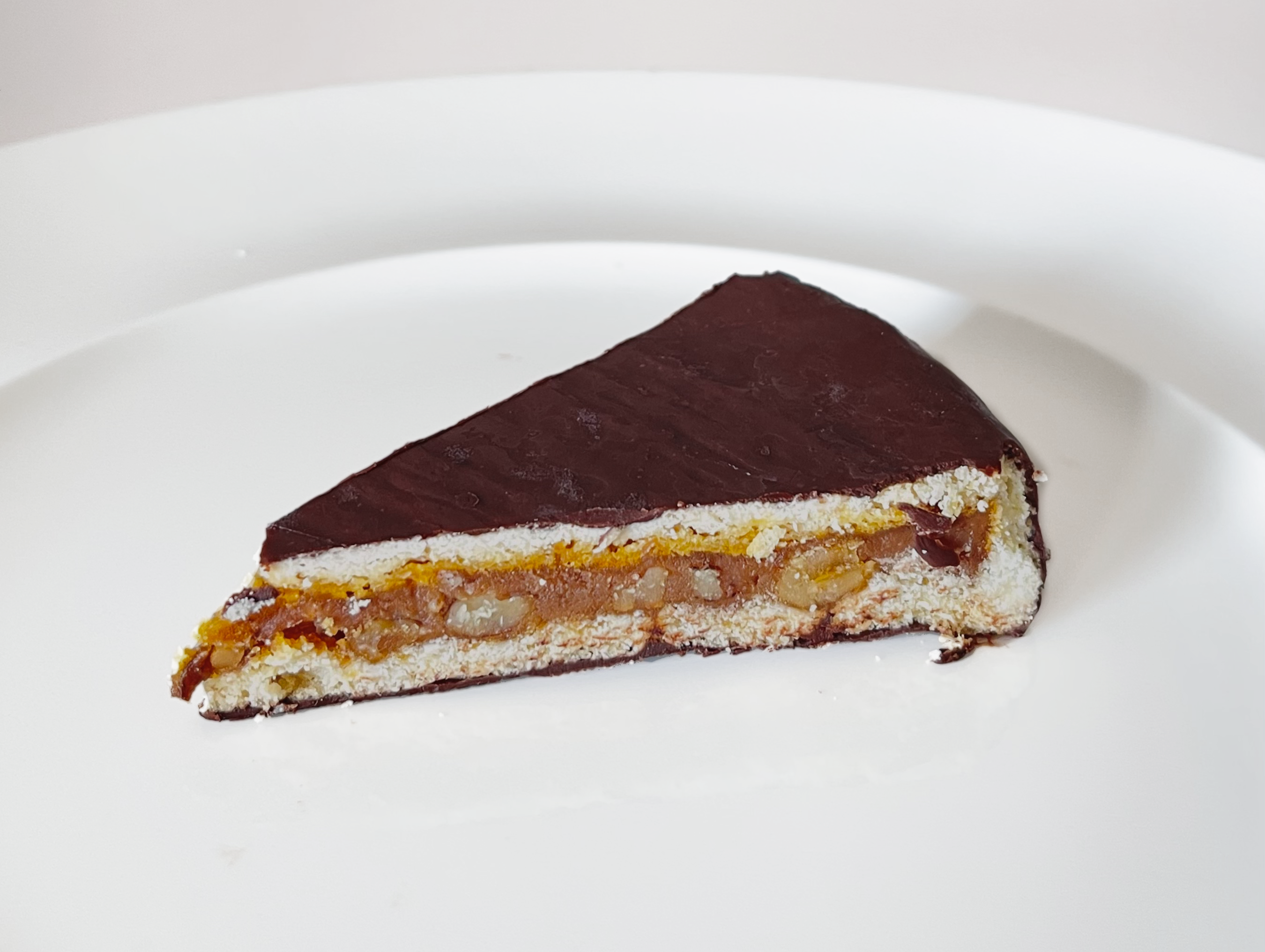
Gâteau bullois

=== From the Italian-speaking part of Switzerland ===
The Italian-speaking part of Switzerland essentially coincides with Ticino, but also with the southern valleys of Graubünden. Popular dishes are polenta and risotto, often accompanied by the Luganighe and Luganighetta, a type of artisan sausages. Typical food from Ticino can be found in a Grotto, the local type of restaurant. Chestnut is also a historical staple food of southern Switzerland. The chestnut tree, introduced there 2,000 years ago, was referred to as the "bread tree". Another specific product of Ticino is olive oil; olive cultivation was revived in the late 20th century.

- Polenta: For centuries polenta was regarded as a meal for the poor. Corn was introduced to the south of what is now Ticino as long ago as the beginning of the 17th century, which led to a change in the monotonous cuisine. But it took another 200 years before polenta – at first made of mixed flour, only later of pure cornmeal – became the staple dish of the area.
- Risotto is another common dish from Ticino. It is made with either mushrooms, saffron or cheese. It is often accompanied with either cooked pork sausages (Luganighe) or other regional cured meats, like salami, coppa and prosciutto.
- Pizzoccheri is a type of short tagliatelle, a flat ribbon pasta, made with a blend of buckwheat flour and wheat flour. It is believed to have originated in Valtellina, a valley in the northern Italian region of Lombardy. They are also popular in Val Poschiavo, a side valley of Valtellina which belongs to the Swiss canton of Grisons.
- Bruscitti are a single-course meal originating in Lombardy and popular in southern Ticino, based on finely chopped beef cooked for a long time. Other ingredients of the dish are butter, lard, garlic, pancetta and fennel seeds. At the end of cooking they are blended with well-structured red wines such as Barbera, Barolo or Gattinara. This dish is served with the polenta, risotto alla milanese or purée.
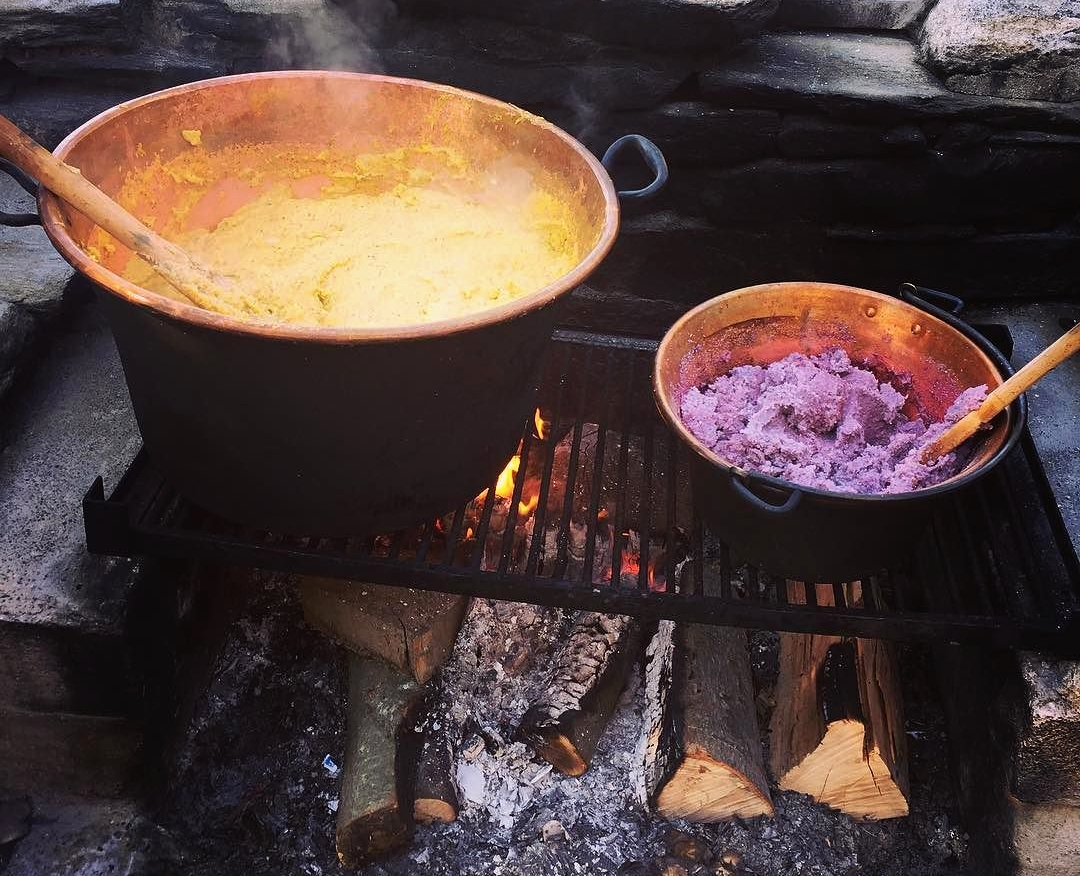
Polenta

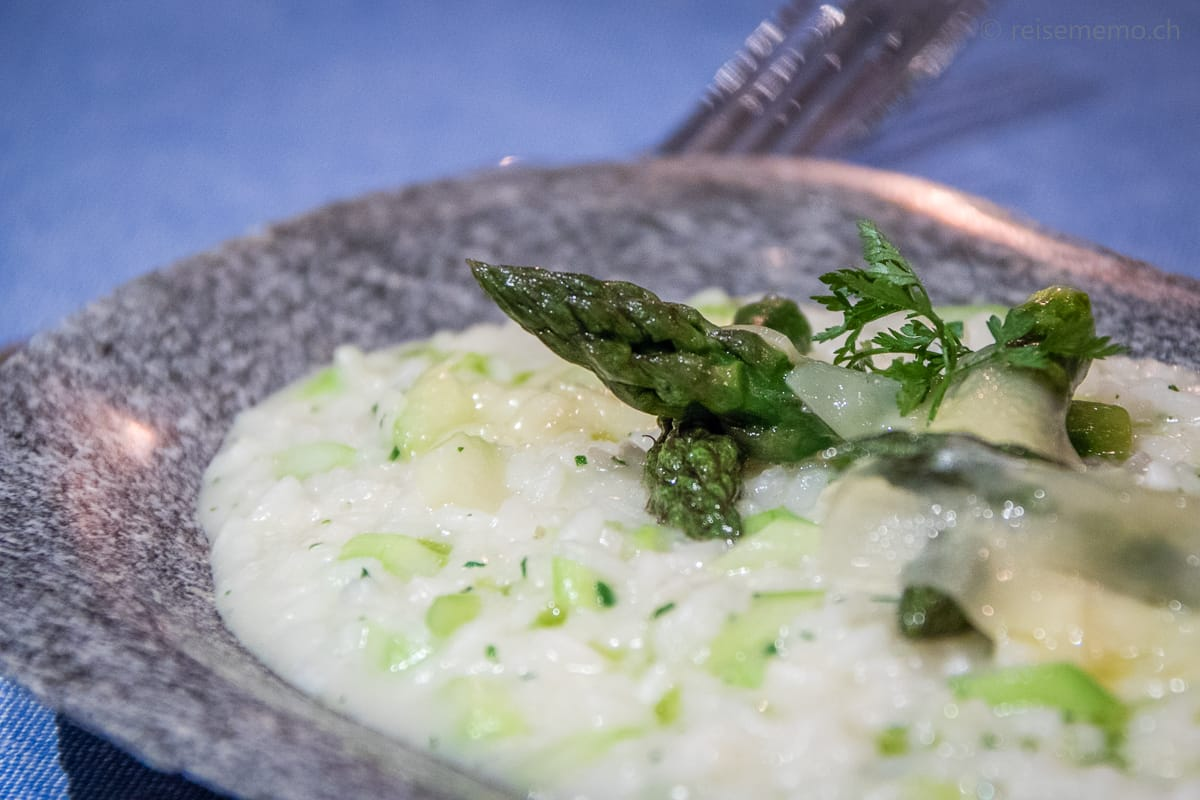
Risotto

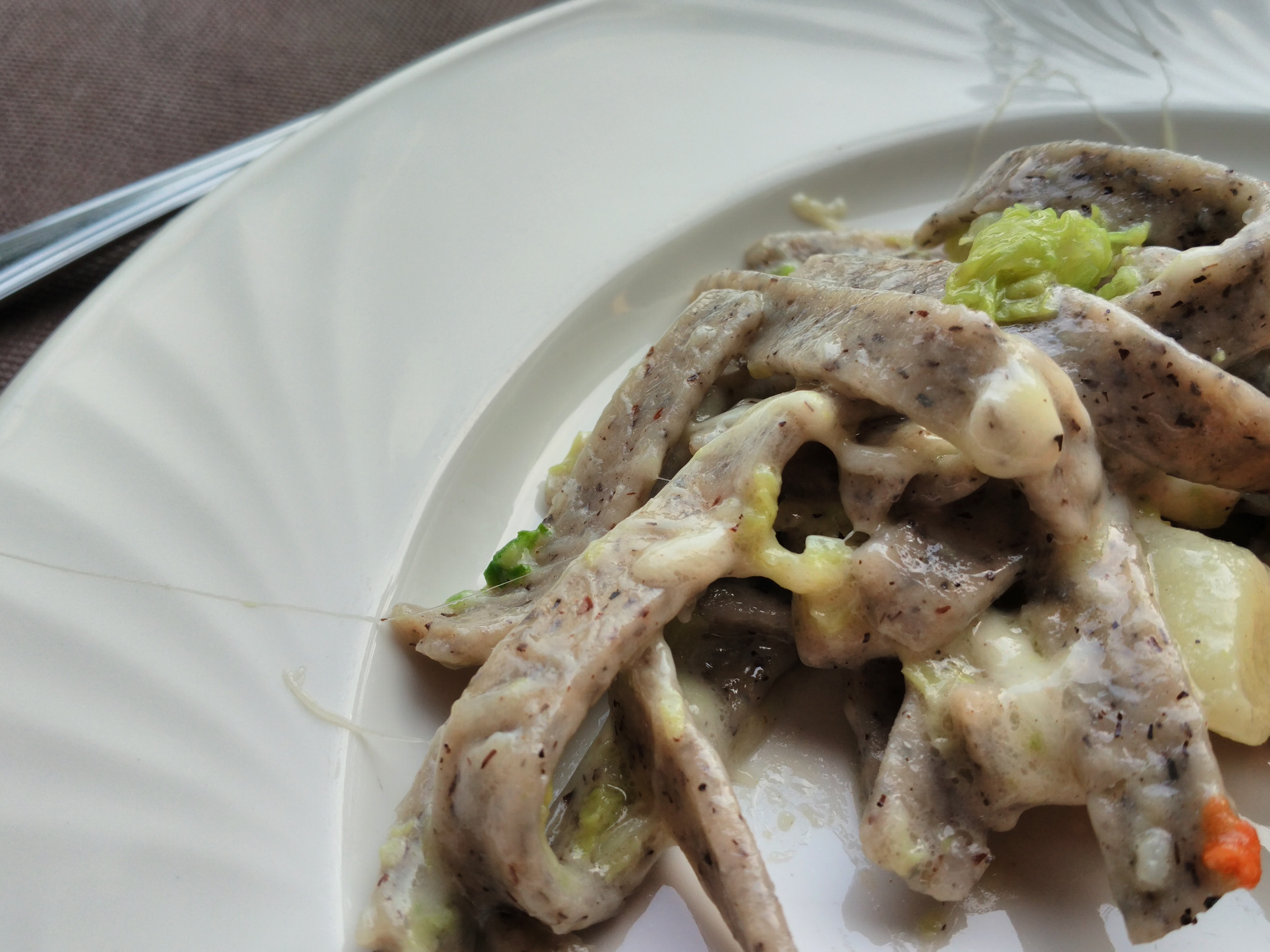
Pizzoccheri

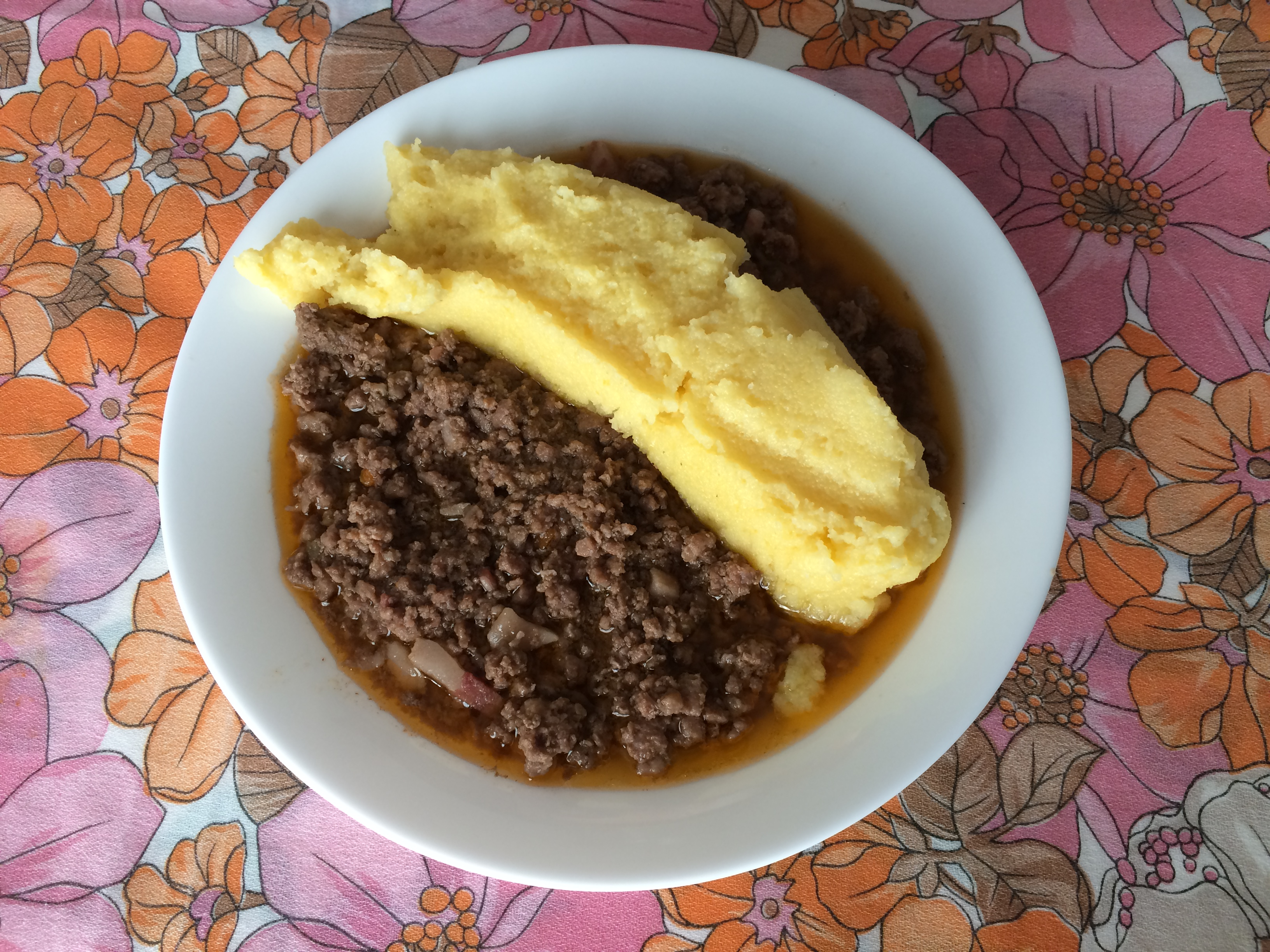
Bruscitti served with polenta

=== From the canton of Graubünden ===
- Bündner Nusstorte: There are several different regional recipes for nut cake, but the most famous is probably the one from the Engadin valley in the canton of Graubünden.
- Bündnerfleisch (GR)
- Chur meat pie
- Bündner barley soup: The most famous soup from Graubünden
- Capuns: Typical speciality of western Graubünden
- Maluns
- Pizokel with cabbage: Pizokel were eaten in a wide variety of ways. In some places when eaten by themselves they are known in Romansh as "bizochels bluts", or "bald pizokel". If someone leaves a small amount of any kind of food on the serving dish for politeness's sake, in the Engadine this is called "far sco quel dal bizoccal", meaning more or less "leaving the last pizokel".
- Plain in Pigna: An oven-baked dish consisting of grated potatoes, ham and salsiz, from the Engadine
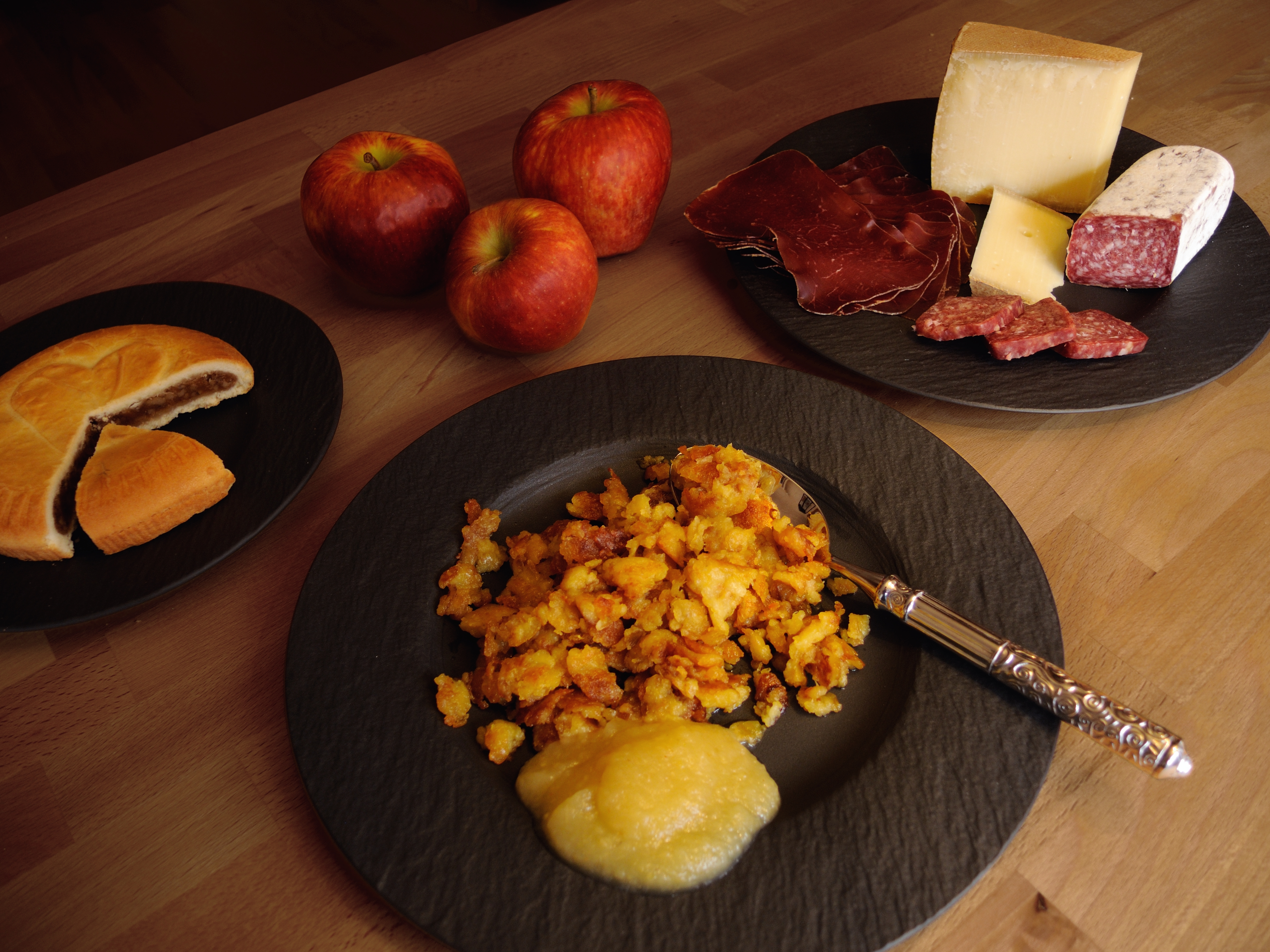
Maluns, accompanied by various specialties of the canton

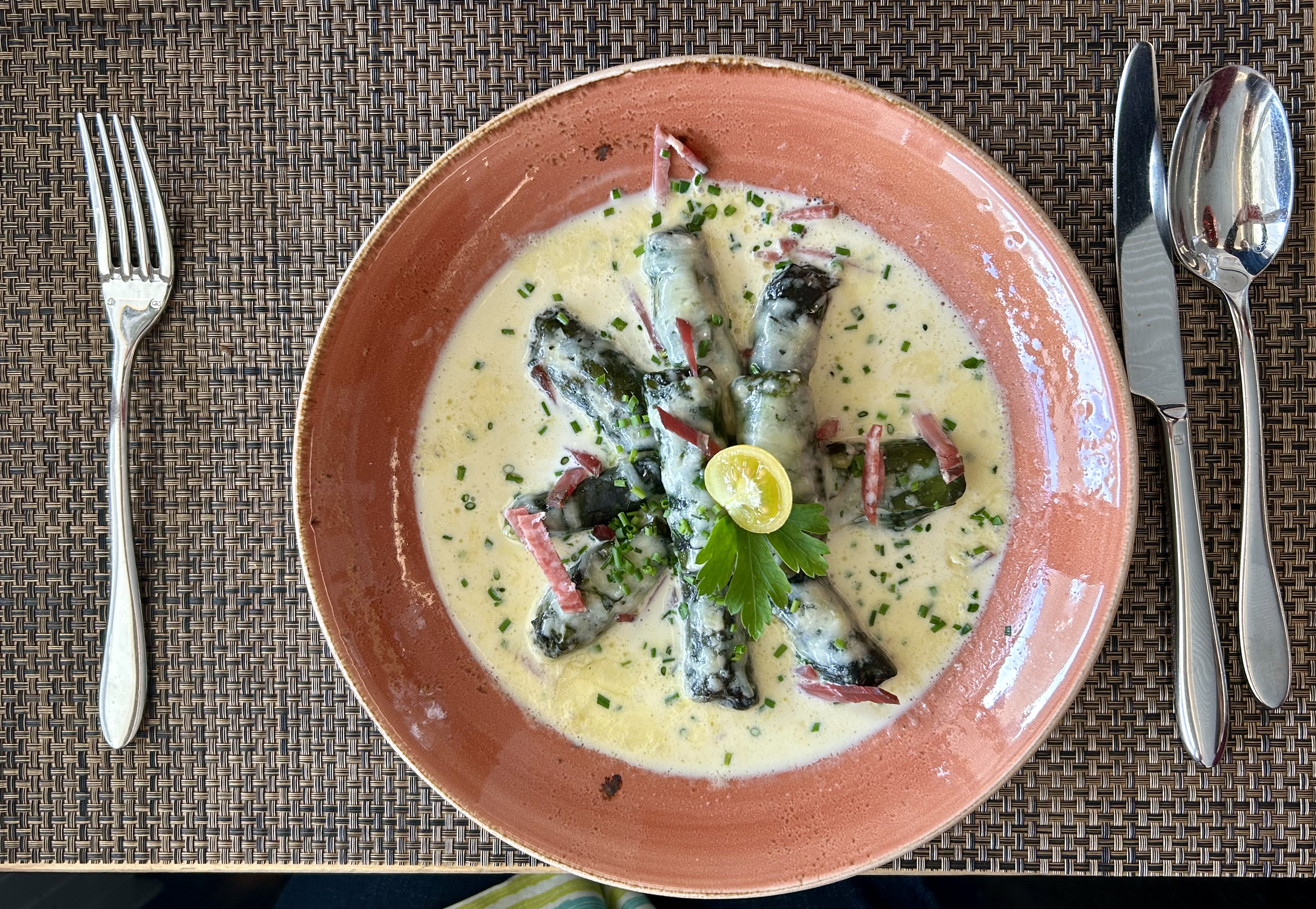
Capuns

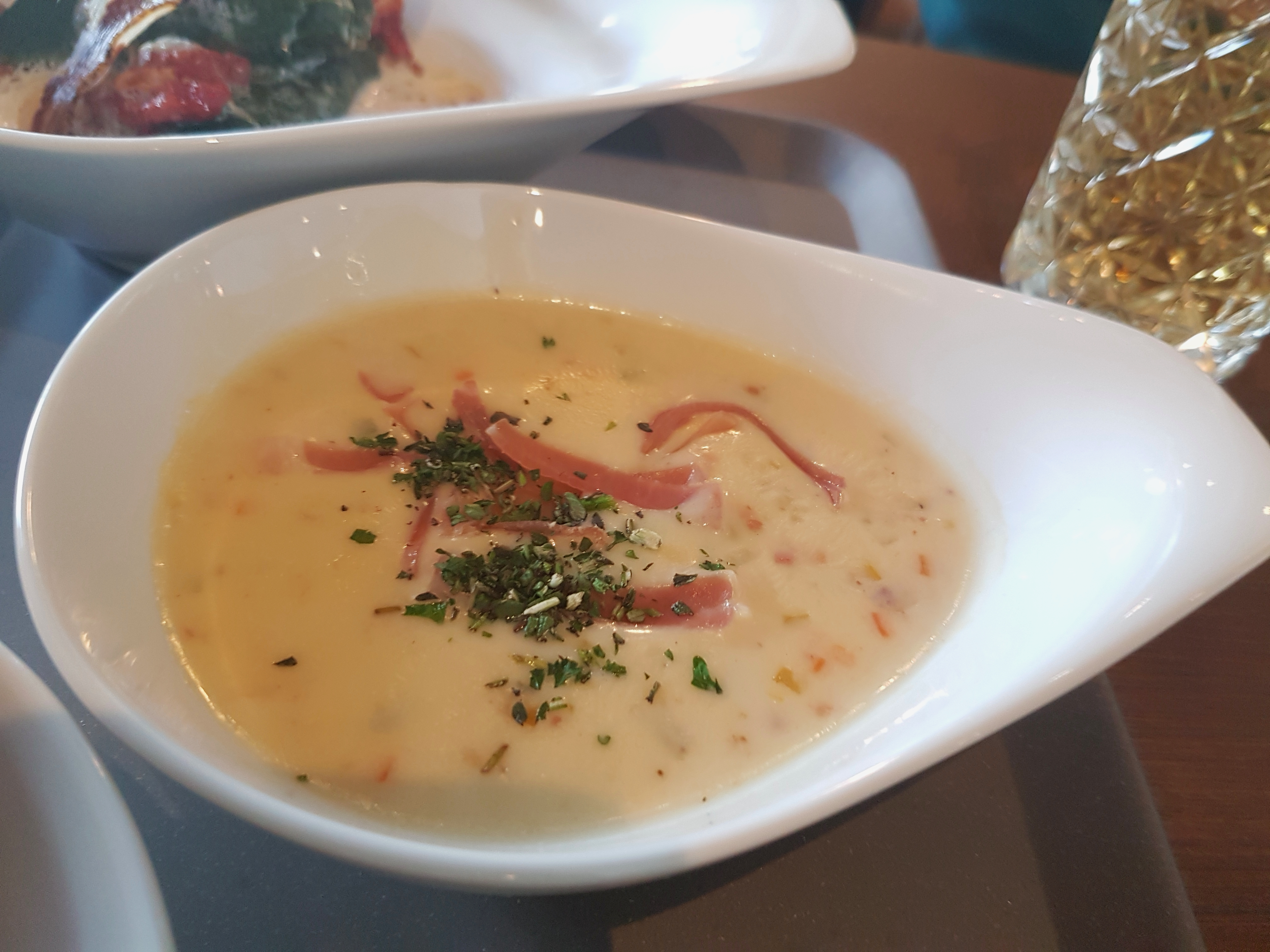
Bündner barley soup

== Restaurants and haute cuisine ==
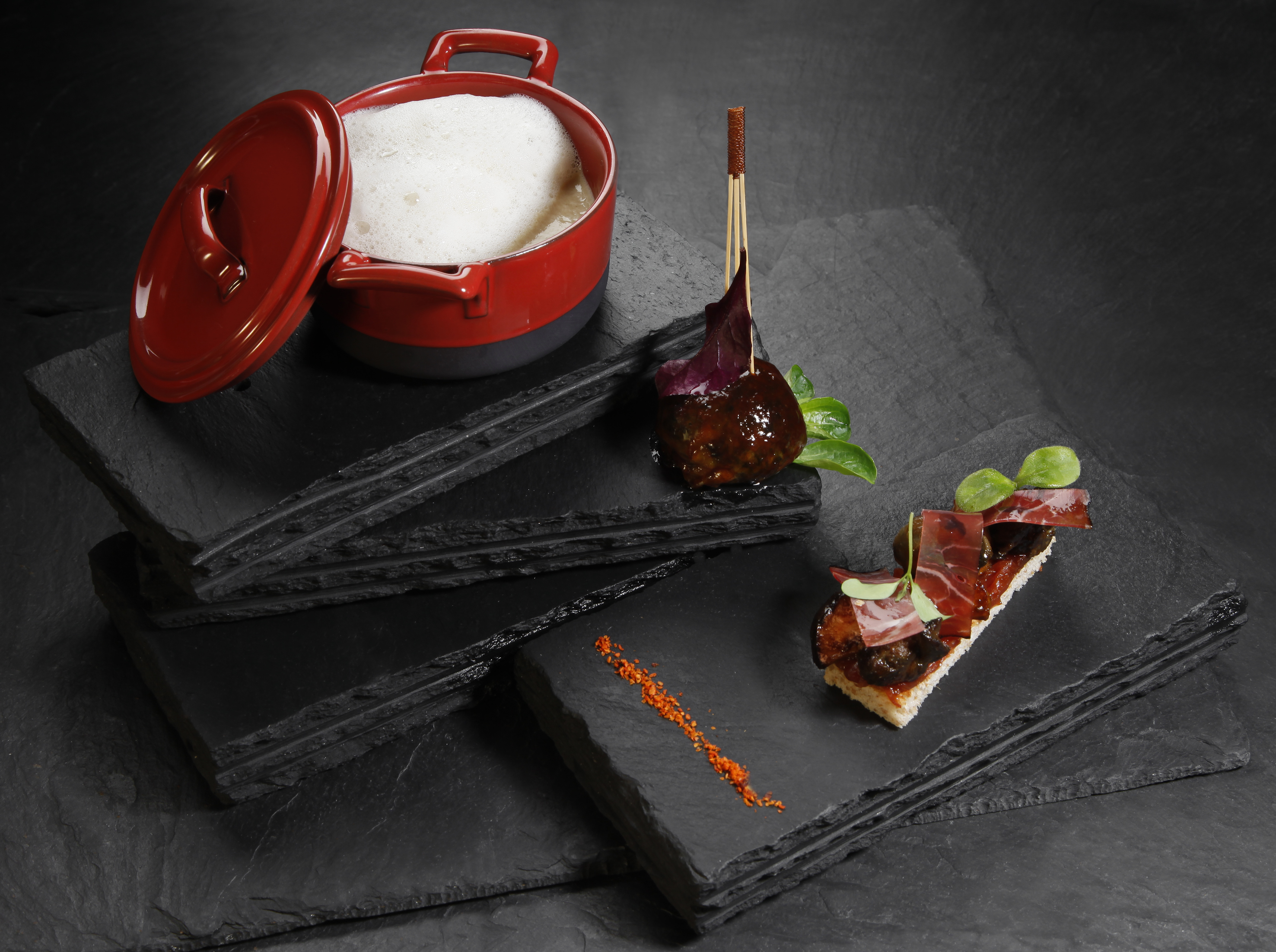
Haute cuisine served in a Geneva restaurant

A large variety of restaurants can be found in Switzerland. The Stube, Stübli or Stiva (German and Romansh), Brasserie (French) and Osteria (Italian) typically serve simple and traditional dishes. This is even more the case in mountain restaurants or mountain huts.

A unique type of restaurant is found in Ticino: the Grotto. Grottoes are rustic eateries, offering traditional food, such as polenta. Authentic grottoes are old wine caves re-functioned into restaurants. Due to their nature they are mostly found in or around forests and built against a rocky background. Typically, the facade is built from granite blocks and the outside tables and benches are made of the same stone as well. Grottoes are popular with locals and tourists alike, especially during the hot summer months.

As a culinary hotspot in the middle of Europe where high-quality ingredients are readily available, Switzerland boasts a high number of luxury restaurants. It also has a long tradition of hospitality, which is reflected in the palace hotels found in numerous localities. In the 2018 Michelin Guide, Switzerland ranked first worldwide in terms of Michelin-starred restaurants per capita. As of 2022, four restaurants were awarded 3 stars: the Restaurant de l'Hôtel de Ville in Crissier, the Schloss Schauenstein in Fürstenau, the Cheval Blanc in Basel and the Memories in Bad Ragaz. Among famous Swiss chefs are Frédy Girardet and Anton Mosimann.

== Beverages ==
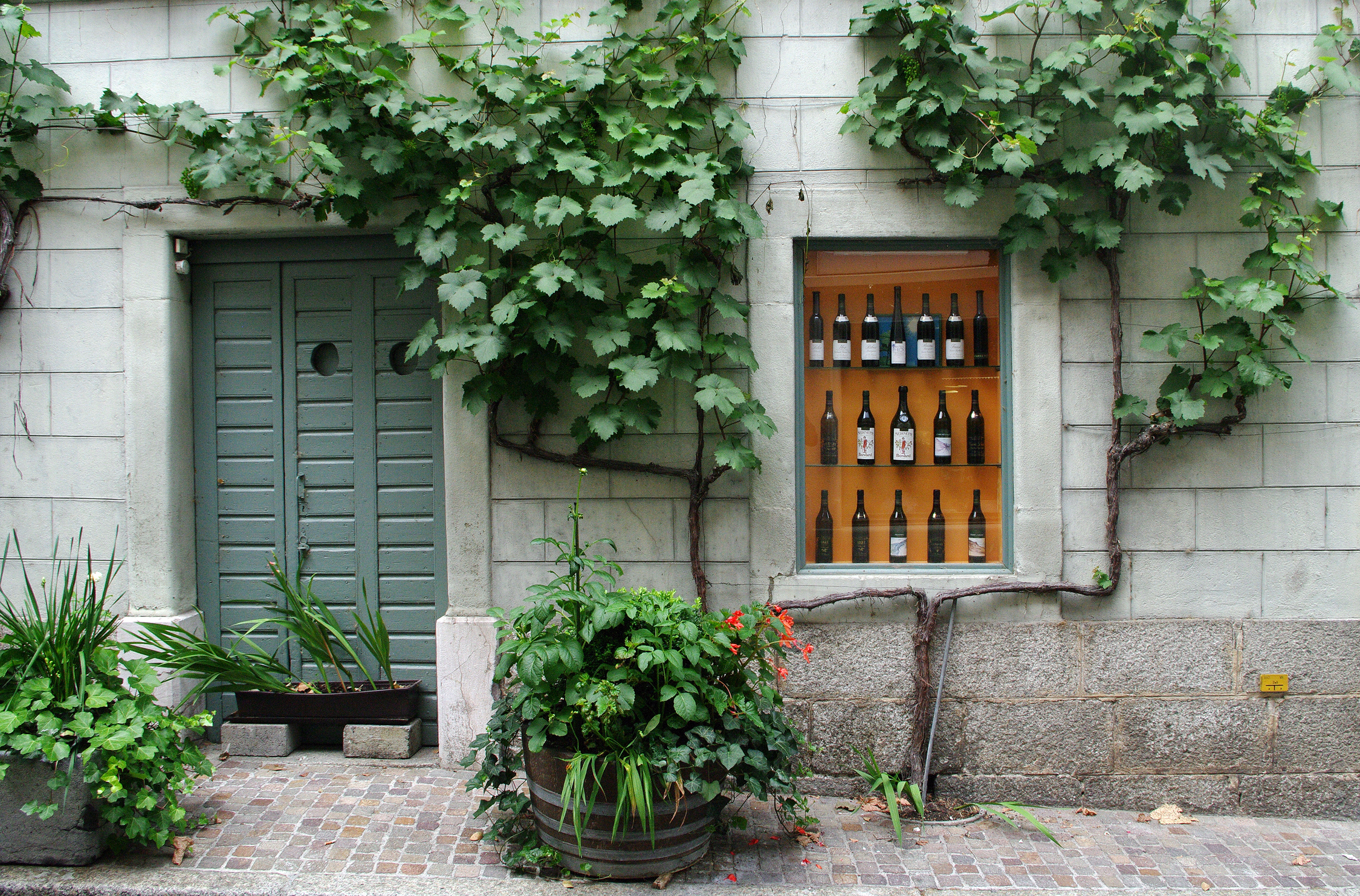
Wine shop in the Lavaux

Wine is produced in many regions of Switzerland, particularly the Valais, the Vaud, the Geneva, the Ticino, the Neuchâtel and the Zürich cantons. Wine economy notably shaped the landscapes of Valais and the Lavaux, which have the most extensive terraced vineyards. Riesling X Sylvaner is a common white wine produced in German-speaking parts of the country, while Chasselas is the most common white wine in the French-speaking parts of the country, where it can also be known as Fendant (in the Valais) and Perlan (in Geneva). Pinot noir is the most popular red grape in both the French-speaking and the German-speaking part, while this position is held by Merlot in the Italian-speaking part.

Beer is second to wine in terms of consumption among Swiss. The country has a long tradition of brewing, with significant domestic beer production and a growing craft brewing sector. Most contemporary large-scale breweries are in German-speaking Switzerland. The Feldschlösschen brewery in Rheinfelden dwarfs all others in the country in terms of output. Calanda brewery in Chur is the largest in Graubünden. Zürich hosts the country's largest beer festival annually, and has a number of microbreweries.

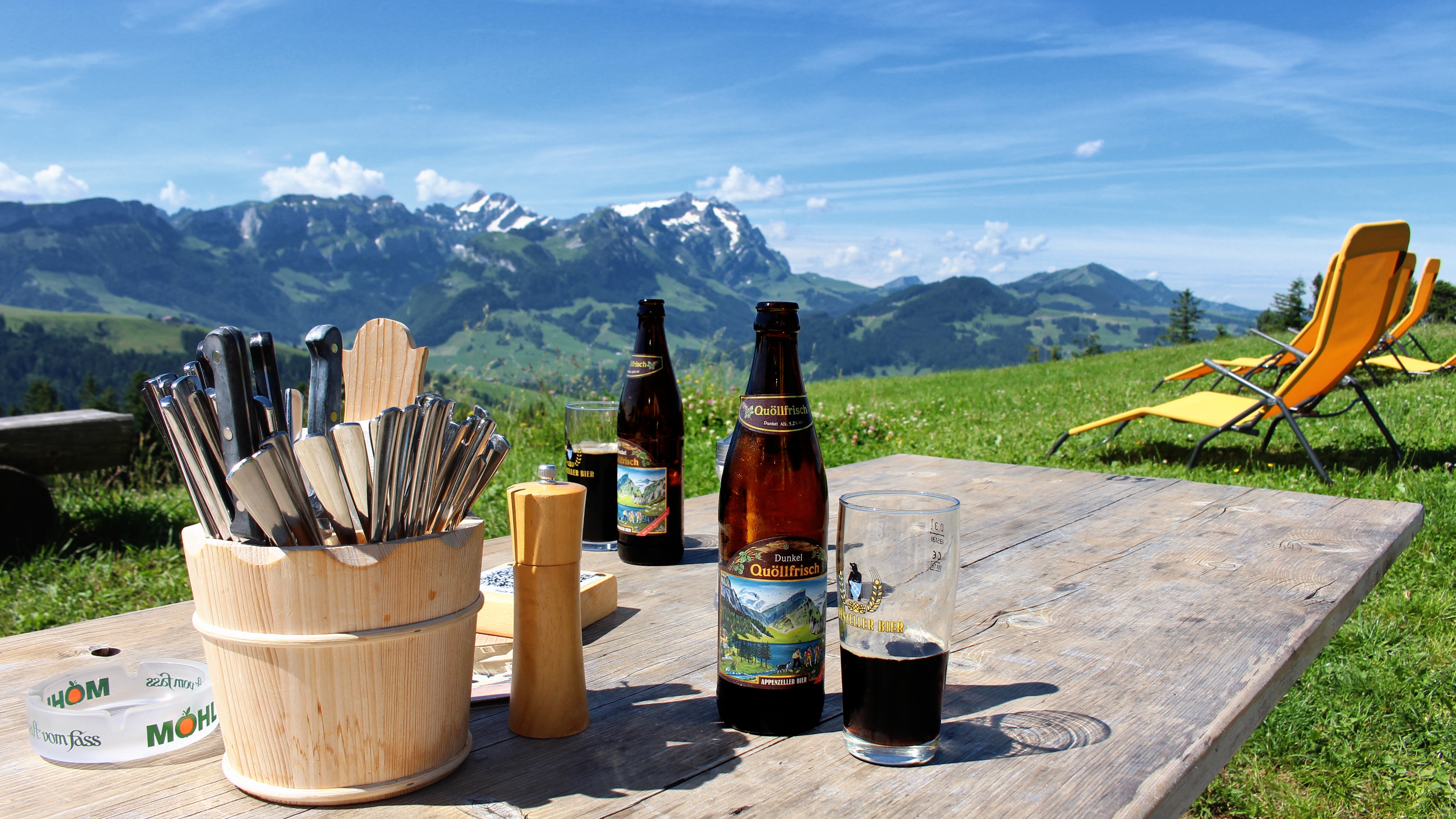
Beer served at a mountain restaurant

Absinthe is perhaps the most famous Swiss spirit. It is legally distilled again in its Val-de-Travers birthplace, in the Jura region of Switzerland. Long banned by a specific anti-Absinthe article in the Swiss Federal Constitution, it was legalized again in 2005, with the adoption of the new constitution. Swiss absinthe is exported to many countries, with Kübler and La Clandestine Absinthe amongst the first new brands to emerge. Wine and beer can legally be purchased by youths aged 16 and up. Spirits and beverages containing distilled alcohol (including wine coolers like Bacardi Breezer) can be bought at age 18.

Damassine is a liqueur produced by distillation of the Damassine prune from the Damassinier tree and is produced in the canton of Jura.

Bon Père William is a famous regional Swiss pear brandy containing 43% ABV. It is usually paired with fondue or raclette dishes or drunk after dinner, and sometimes poured into coffee alongside dessert. Some bottles are available with the full-size pear inside the bottle, grown with the bud placed in the bottle. There are many other types of regional brandies made from local fruit, the most popular being cherries (kirschwasser).

Rivella, a carbonated Swiss drink based on lactose, is one of the most popular drinks in Switzerland. Apple juice, both still and sparkling, is popular in many areas of Switzerland, as is apple cider. The chocolate drink Ovomaltine (also known as "Ovaltine") originates in Switzerland and enjoys ongoing popularity, particularly with young people. Aside from being a beverage, the powder is also eaten sprinkled on top of a slice of buttered bread.

Switzerland has the seventh highest per capita coffee consumption worldwide.

== See also ==
- Culinary Heritage of Switzerland, an online encyclopedia of Swiss food
- Health in Switzerland
- Alpine cuisine
