= Animal production and consumption in Switzerland =

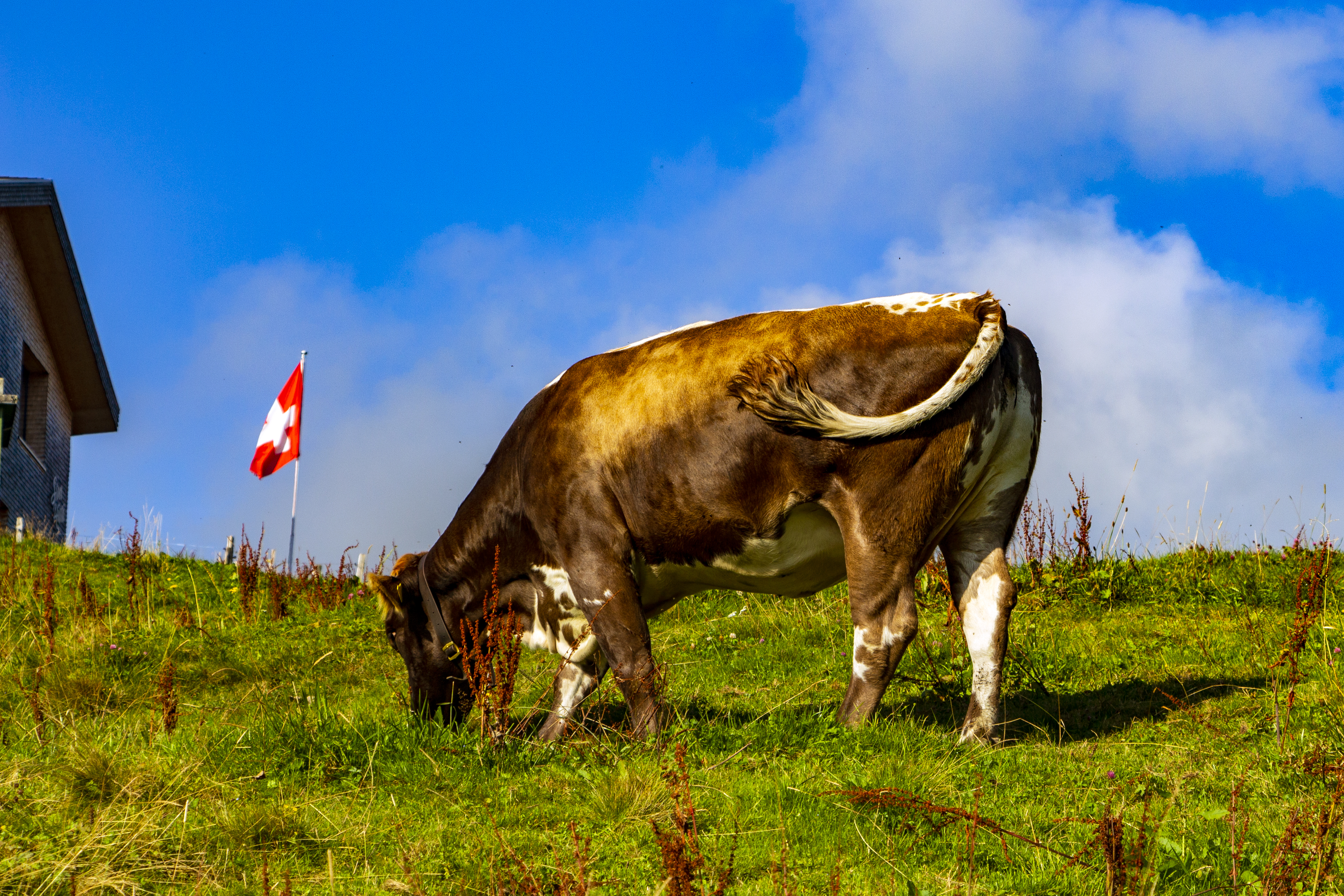
A cow in Switzerland.

This article provides information on animal production and consumption in Switzerland.

Animal production in Switzerland covers livestock numbers (cattle, pigs, poultry, sheep), egg and milk production, and animals slaughtered for meat production.

Animal consumption in Switzerland refers to all animal products, whether locally produced or imported, consumed in Switzerland.

== Livestock ==
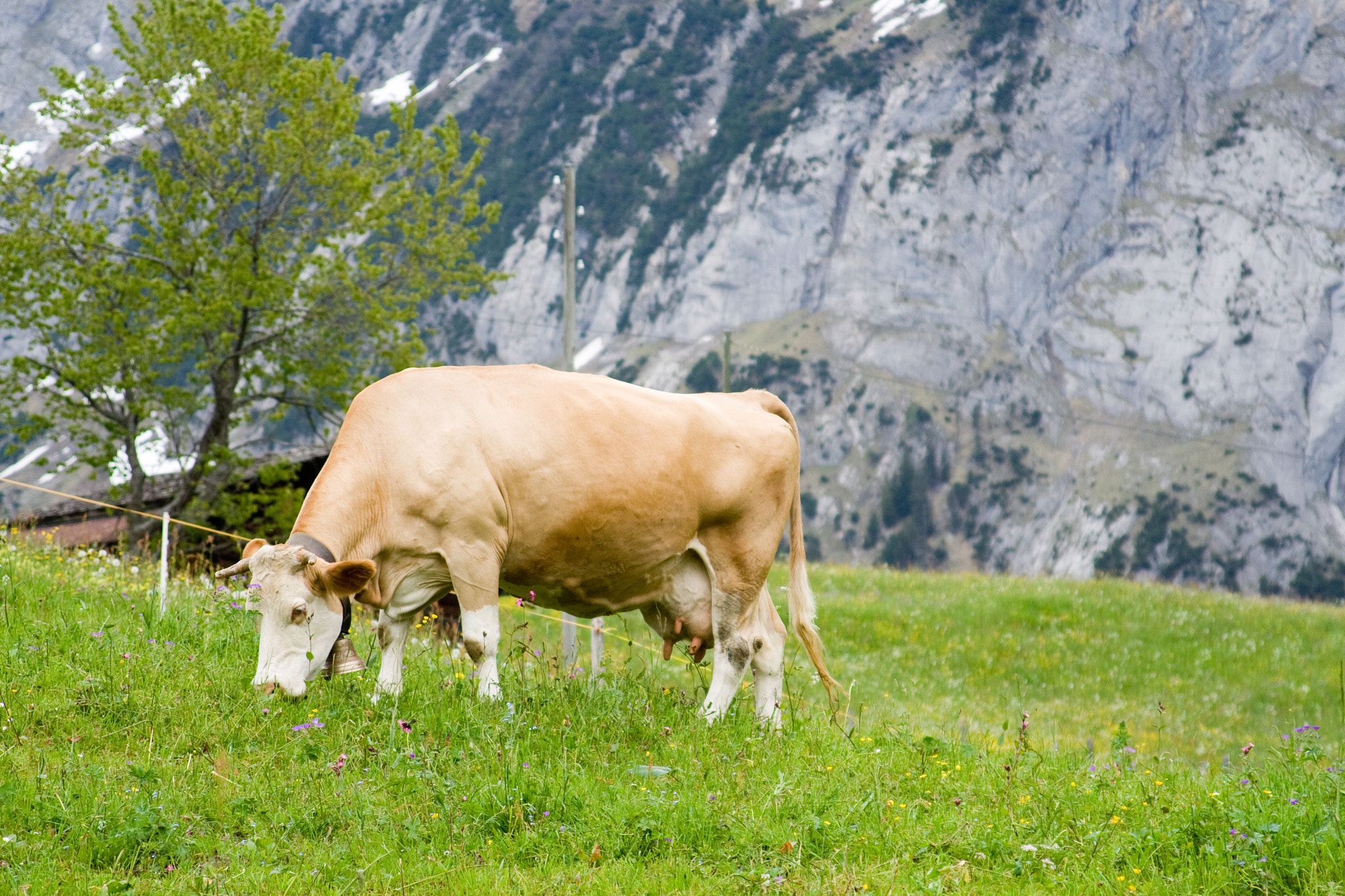
A Simmental cow in Switzerland.

=== Number of animals raised on farms ===
In 2012, the number of livestock in Switzerland was as follows:

- 1,544,017 pigs, including 128,367 breeding sows;
- 1,564,631 cattle, including 705,642 cows (45.1% of all cattle);
- 9,878,279 hens, including 2,520,633 laying and breeding hens (25.5% of all hens) and 76,322 other poultry;
- 417,274 sheep;
- 58,031 horses and 20,140 other equines;
- 88,089 goats.

Livestock density is high in Switzerland. It is more than double the average livestock density in the European Union. There are 1.7 livestock units per ha of usable agricultural area in Switzerland, compared with 0.7 in the EU, 3.6 in the Netherlands, 1.9 in Denmark, 1.1 in Germany, 0.9 in Austria, 0.8 in France and Italy.

==== Livestock meat production ====
In 2012, according to the Swiss meat trade association Proviande coopérative, 61,020,200 livestock were slaughtered in Switzerland, distributed as follows:

- Cattle: 641,400
- Steers: 32,600
- Heifers: 79,200
- Bulls: 105,400
- Cows: 171,600
- Calves: 252,000
- Pigs: 2,782,800
- Sheep: 234,700
- Poultry: 57,596,000

== Wild animals ==
=== Number of wild animals in Switzerland ===
Ungulates
	1970	1980	1990	2000	2010	2012
Red deer	11,880	20,468	21,195	23,402	28,504	30,349
Deer	92,585	102,140	117,203	128,133	112,734	115,289
Chamois	53,360	63,965	94,447	89,535	91,334	91,856
Alpine ibex	7,088 (1973)	10,206	14,451	13,785	15,552	16,645

== Hunting in Switzerland ==
In 2014, Switzerland had 29,864 people authorized to hunt, including 1,337 novice hunters in training. Of these, 14,493 hunters held a hunting license for big game and 10,415 a license for small game. Hunting is controlled by 173 permanent game wardens and 1,507 auxiliaries.

=== Wild game slaughtered in Switzerland ===
Hunting chart

	1970	1980	1990	2000	2010	2014
Red deer	1,611	4,097	6,241	6,997	9,016	10,715
Deer	26,111	43,958	37,239	42,210	39,664	40,575
Chamois	10,821	14,818	17,976	16,511	13,319	12,129
Wild boar	60	534	1,496	3,939	6,878	5,802
Alpine ibex (protected)	0	471 (1981)	1,068	923	1,074	1,054

Carnivore
	1970	1980	1990	2000	2010	2014
Red fox	1,9950	13,869	33,174	39,208	28,224	24,093
Badger	1,563	950	1,812	2,465	2,764	2,483
Weasel	1,495	2,897	3,163	2,645	1,407	1,217
Pine marten	590	371	192	148	127	138

Various
	1970	1980	1990	2000	2010	2014
Brown hare	20,097	14,597	5,618	2,584	2,398	1,740
Variable hare	2,355	1,865	1,526	1,175	1,335	1,181
Wild rabbit	591	663	403	28	6	0
Alpine marmot	9,833	8,456	7,015	7,720	7,884	6,445

== Meat products ==
=== Delicatessen ===
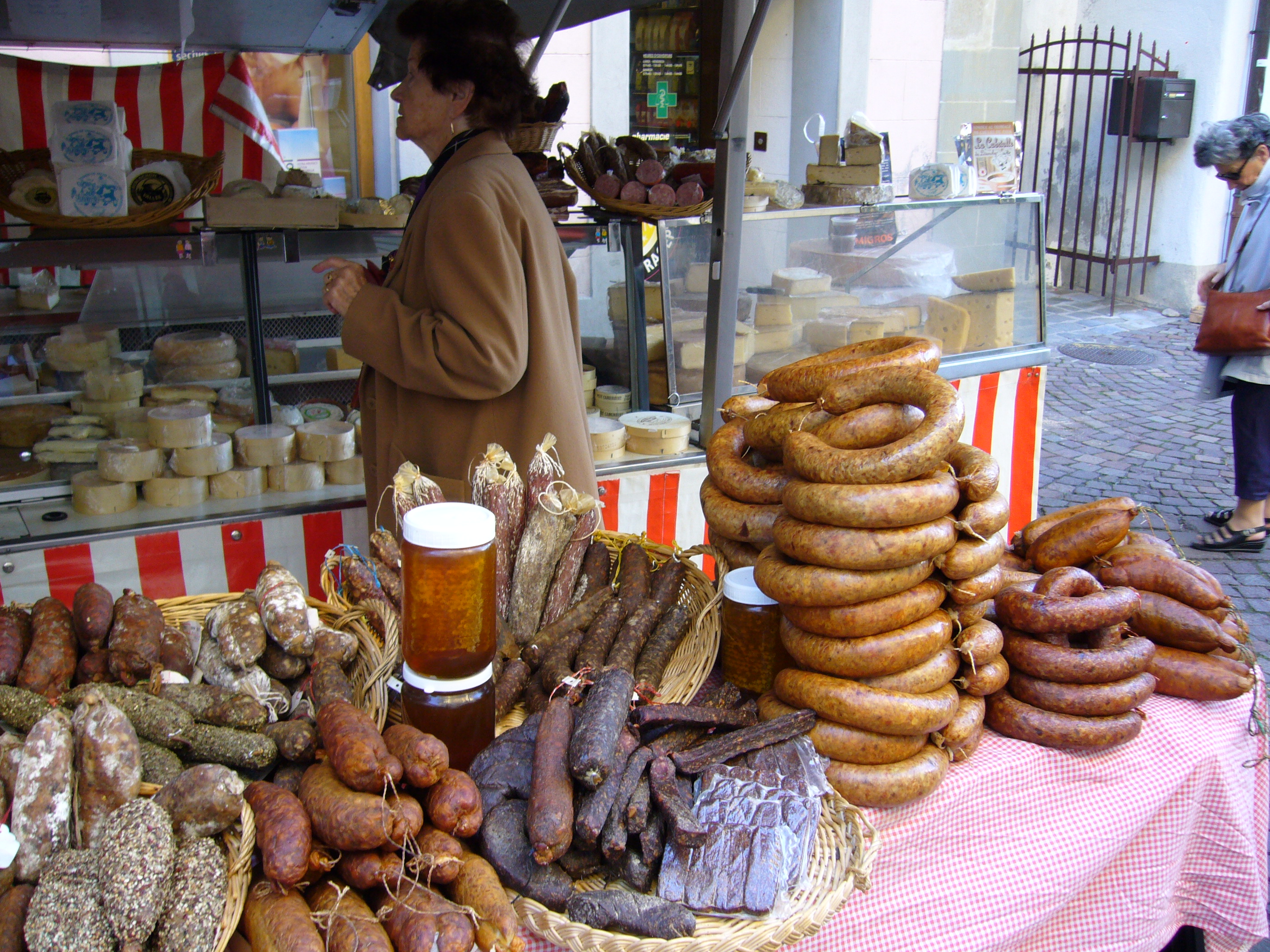
Delicatessen on a shelf at the market in Lutry.

- Mostbröckli from Appenzell, PGI candidate, smoked and cured beef or cow, Appenzell
- Smoked jowl, Ajoie
- Brési, braisi, bresi, brezi, breusi, breuzil, breusil, brézot or brésat, piece of beef salted then briefly smoked for cooking or a piece of beef salted, smoked and air-dried and eaten raw, Swiss Jura, in particular the Canton of Jura and Bernese Jura.
- Bündner Rohschinken / Schambun criv dal Grischun, Grisons cured ham, salted and dried pork leg, Grisons
- Bündnerfleisch, Grisons PGI meat

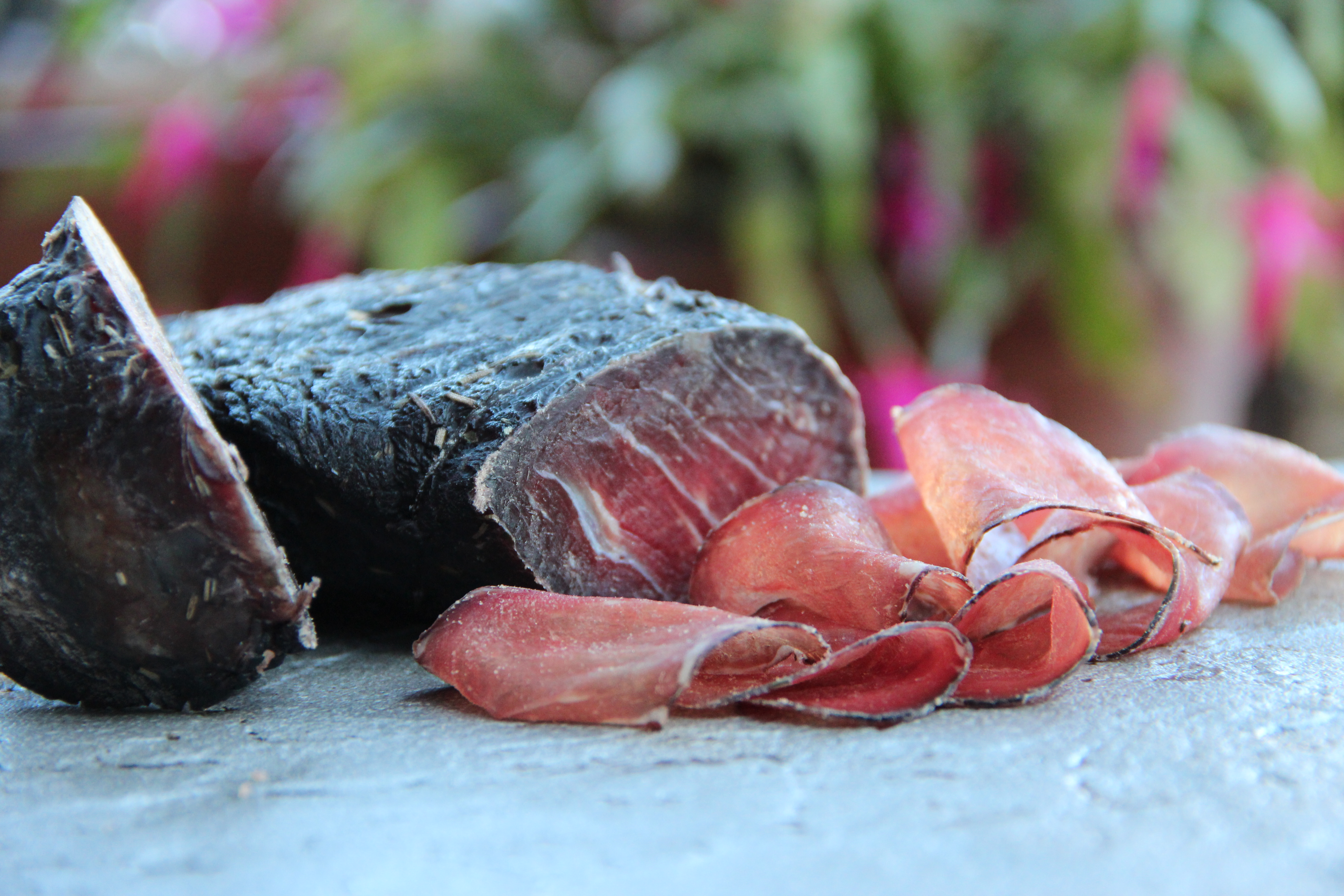
Dried meat from the Swiss Alps

- Coppa, made from the meat of the back of the pig's neck, eaten raw, sliced, Ticino, Italian-speaking Graubünden and northern Italy
- Fleischkäse or Italian cheese in French-speaking Switzerland
- Cured ham, ham on the bone, dry-cured ham, rolled ham
- Bauernschinken (country ham), salted, smoked and cooked pork meat
- IGP Valais cured ham
- Ham cooked in asphalt
- Borne ham, PDO candidate since 2006, (Farmhouse ham, ham on the bone), smoked pork ham. An important part of Fribourg's culinary heritage, especially during the Bénichon feast. It is smoked in the "borne", a large open fireplace with a plank hood, once found on most farms in Fribourg, Canton de Fribourg and Broye vaudoise.
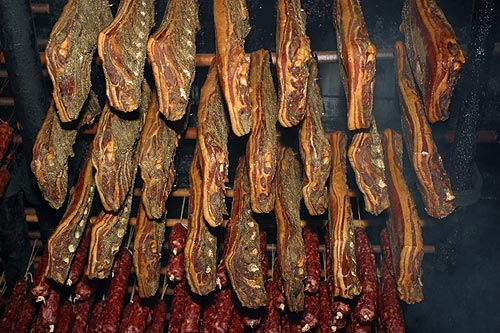
  Bacon and sausage smoking
- Pork shank, Schweinshaxe or Gnagi
- Lammlidji, dried leg of lamb
- Lard / Bauernspeck / Lardo to be eaten raw, smoked lard, lard de campagne, lard sec, lard sec fumé, etc.
  - IGP dry Valais bacon
- Lardo, lard eaten raw, thinly sliced, Ticino and Val Mesolcina
- Oss in bogia, Ticino and Val Mesolcina
- Pate of the Princes-Évêques, pork pie, Jura

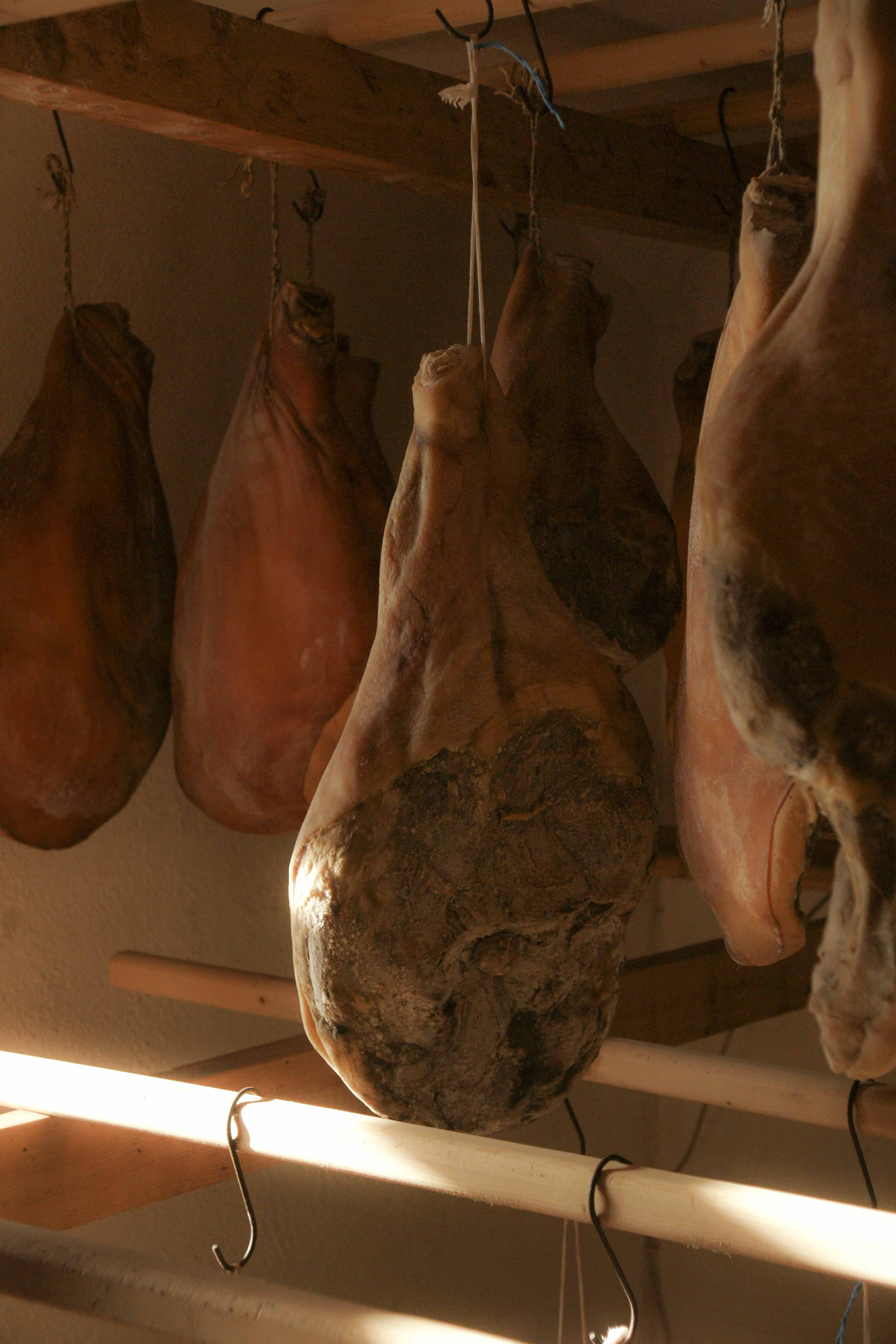
Meat drying in Grisons

- Meat pâté, country pâté, pâté en croûte, rabbit pâté
- Pâté vaudois
- Pancetta piana, bacon (crispy pork belly), Italian-speaking Ticino and Grisons
- Pavé des Moines, Jura
- Prosciutto crudo della Mesolcina, bone-in or boneless pork ham flavored with garlic, dried and smoked, Ticino
- Tête marbrée in French-speaking Switzerland (Schwartenmagen in German-speaking Switzerland), also known as fromage de tête or fromage de porc, or gelée de ménage in the Jura; Produced throughout Switzerland, but the tradition of tête marbrée is particularly strong in the cantons of Jura and Vaud.
- Schwinigi Stückli, smoked pork neck, with fat and bones, Appenzell hinterland (AI, AR, SG)
- Terrines
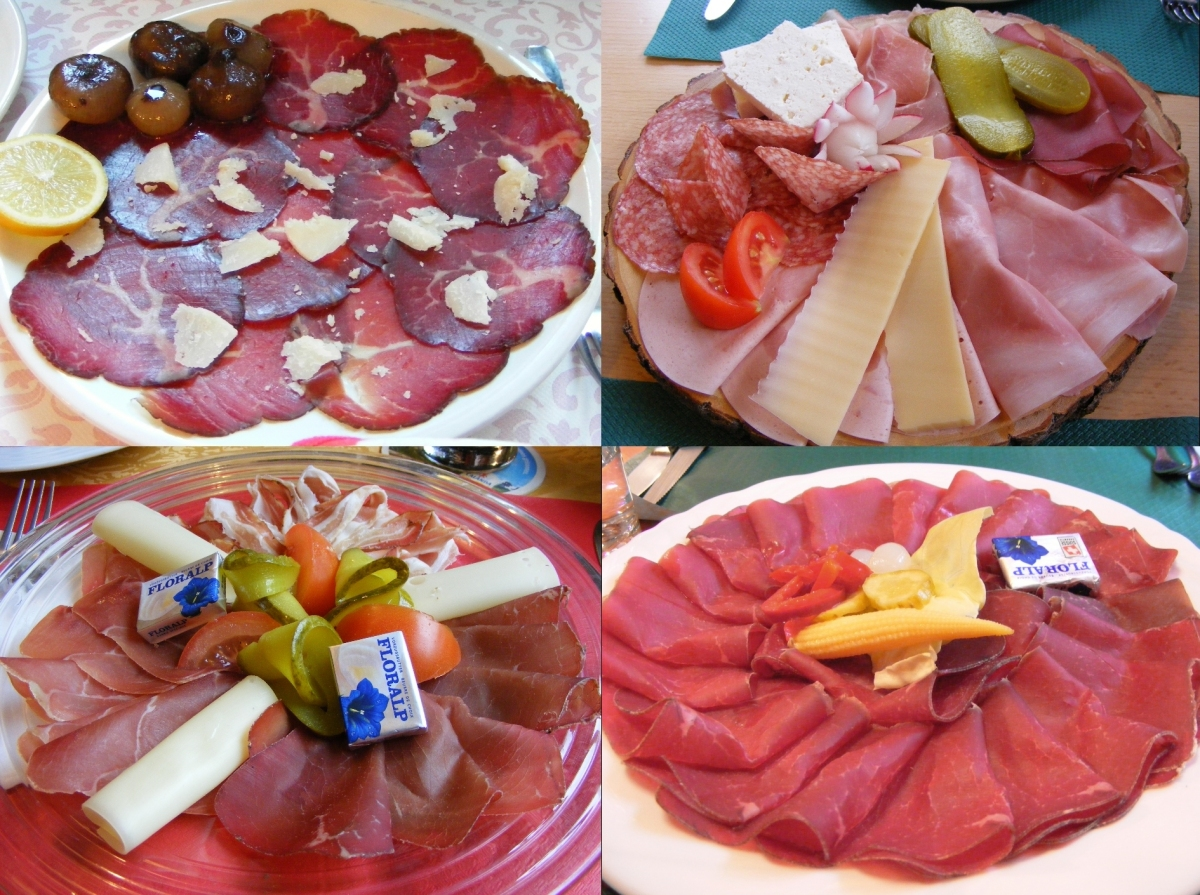
  Various delicatessen plates
- Fribourg smoked meats, beef
- Jura smoked meats, pork
- Dried meats, mostly beef
- Valais IGP dried meat, beef
- Violini di capra e camoscio, salted and dried goat or chamois leg or shoulder, Ticino

=== Sausages ===
- Aargauer Sonntagswurst, sausage made from veal and pork, Aargau
- Appenzeller Pantli (de), PGI candidate, raw garlic sausage, smoked or air-dried, made from beef, pork and bacon, Appenzell
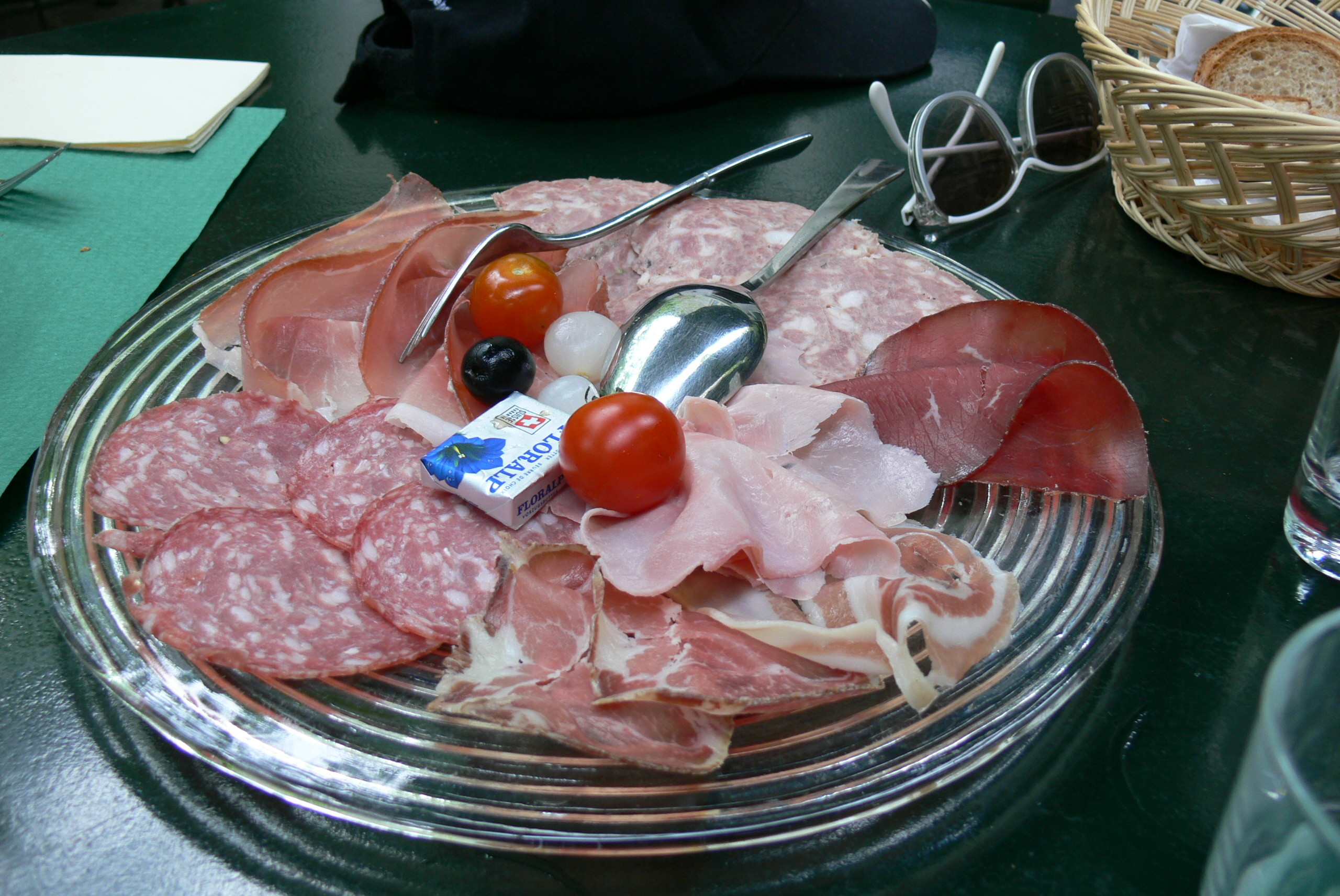
  A plate of cold cuts in Ticino
- Appenzeller Siedwurst (de), PGI candidate, boiled beef and pork sausage, possibly with veal, Appenzell
- Cream pudding
- Black pudding
- Boutefas, PDO, traditional Vaud and Fribourg sausage
- Cervelas, industrially-produced consumer product.
- Chantzet, a typical Pays-d'Enhaut blood sausage made from cabbage and pork.

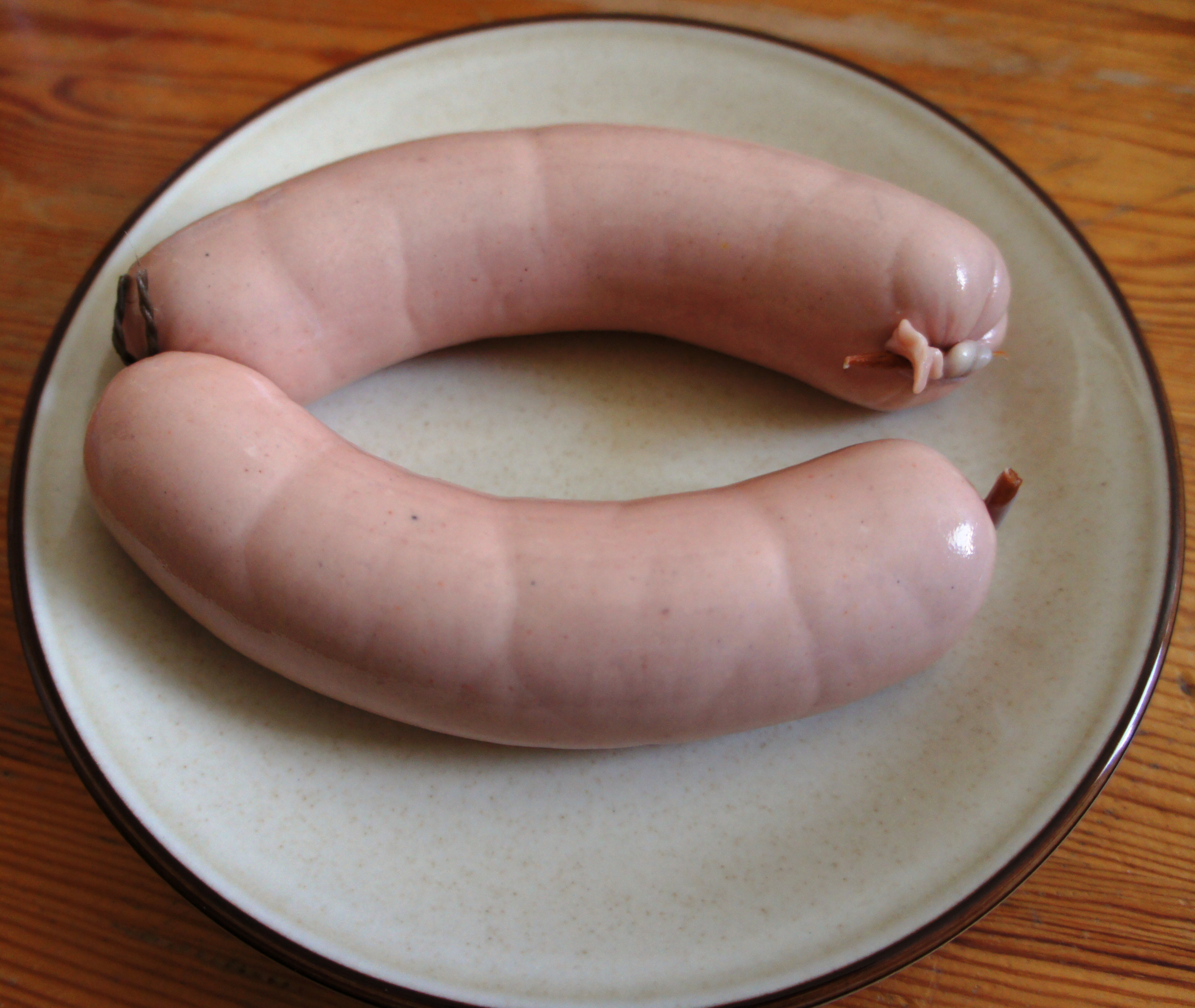
Appenzell sausages

- Churer Beinwurst / Liongia cun ossa, raw pork sausage smoked in a bovine intestine, Grisons
- Cicitt, long, thin goat sausage, Ticino
- Cotechino, large cooked pork sausage, Ticino, Italian-speaking Grisons and northern Italy
- Emmentaler Bauernbratwurst, Emmental farmer's roast sausage, raw sausage made from pork that has been left to mature.
- Emmentalerli, smoked sausage made from beef, pork, bacon, rind and spices. Emmental and surroundings
- Engadiner Hauswurst / Liongia engiadinaisa, Engadin sausage, cooked and smoked beef and pork sausage, Grisons
- Frauenfelder Salzissen, boiled sausage mainly eaten hot, made from beef, pork and veal, neck fat and rind, green or brown for smoking, Frauenfeld region.
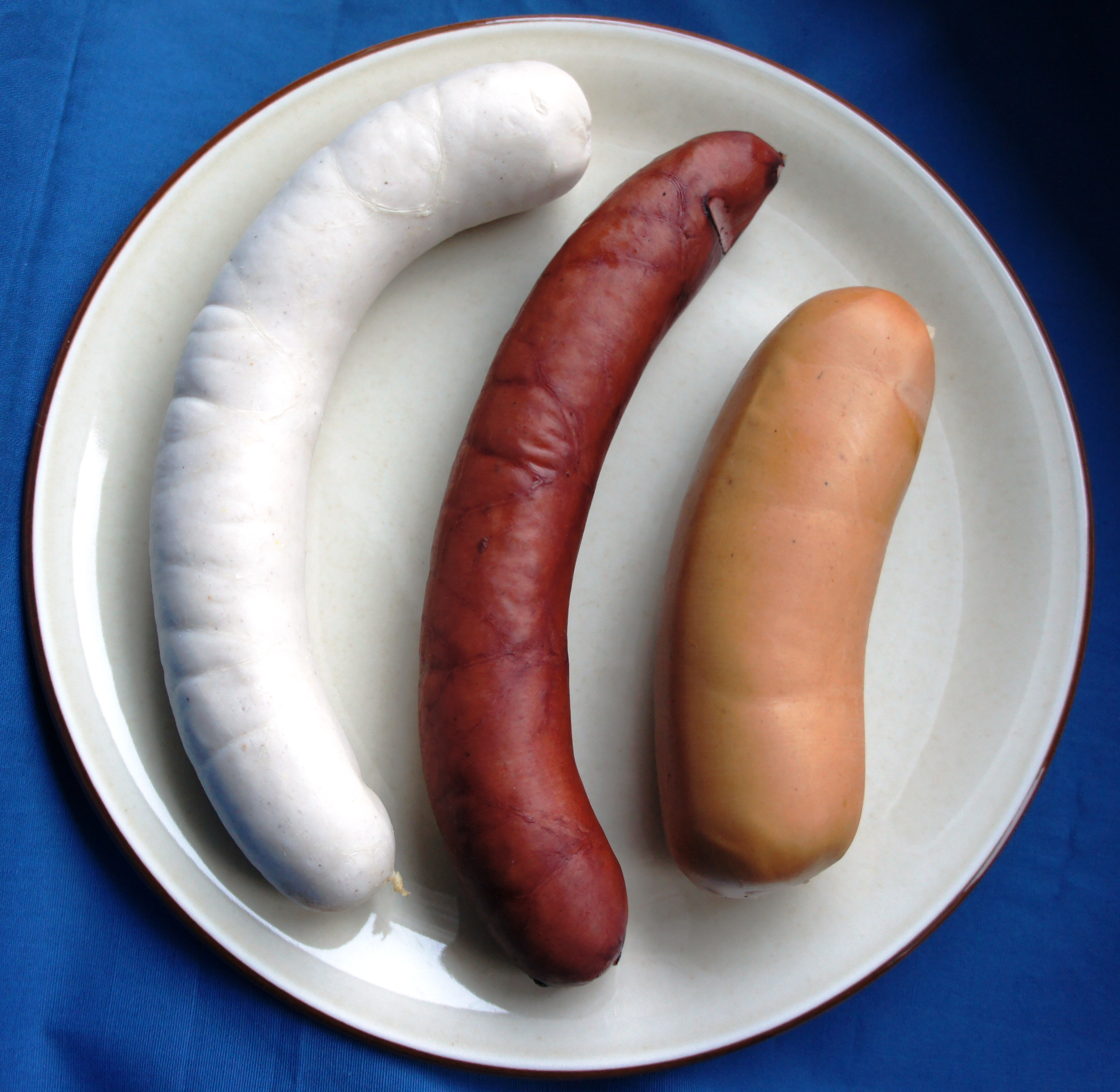
  A St. Gallen bratwurst, a St. Gallen schüblig and a cervelatschüblig de Saint-Gall et un cervelat
- Gendarme (Landjäger)
- Glarner Kalberwurst (de) IGP (Chalberwurscht), boiled white sausage made from veal, bacon (Wurstspeck), milk, egg, white bread and spices, Glarus
- Glarner Netzbraten, sausage in the form of a "roast", cooked tied up in the oven, composed of veal and pork, bacon or rind, calf's head, water or milk and spices, Glarus
- Glarner Schüblig, cooked green sausage made from beef, pork and bacon, Glarus
- Gumpesel, raw sausage with a pronounced smoky taste made from pork and beef.

Hallauer Schinkenwurst, cooked and smoked sausage, mainly eaten in slices. Hallau and Canton Schaffhausen, Zurich conurbation

- Kartoffelwurst / Liongia da tartuffels, potato sausage, two variants: one made from beef and pork, sometimes liver, air-dried for several weeks. It takes on a very dark color due to the blood it contains. The second is a kind of siedwurst made from ground beef, Grisons
- Krakauer Wurst, sausage made from beef and pork, Lucerne
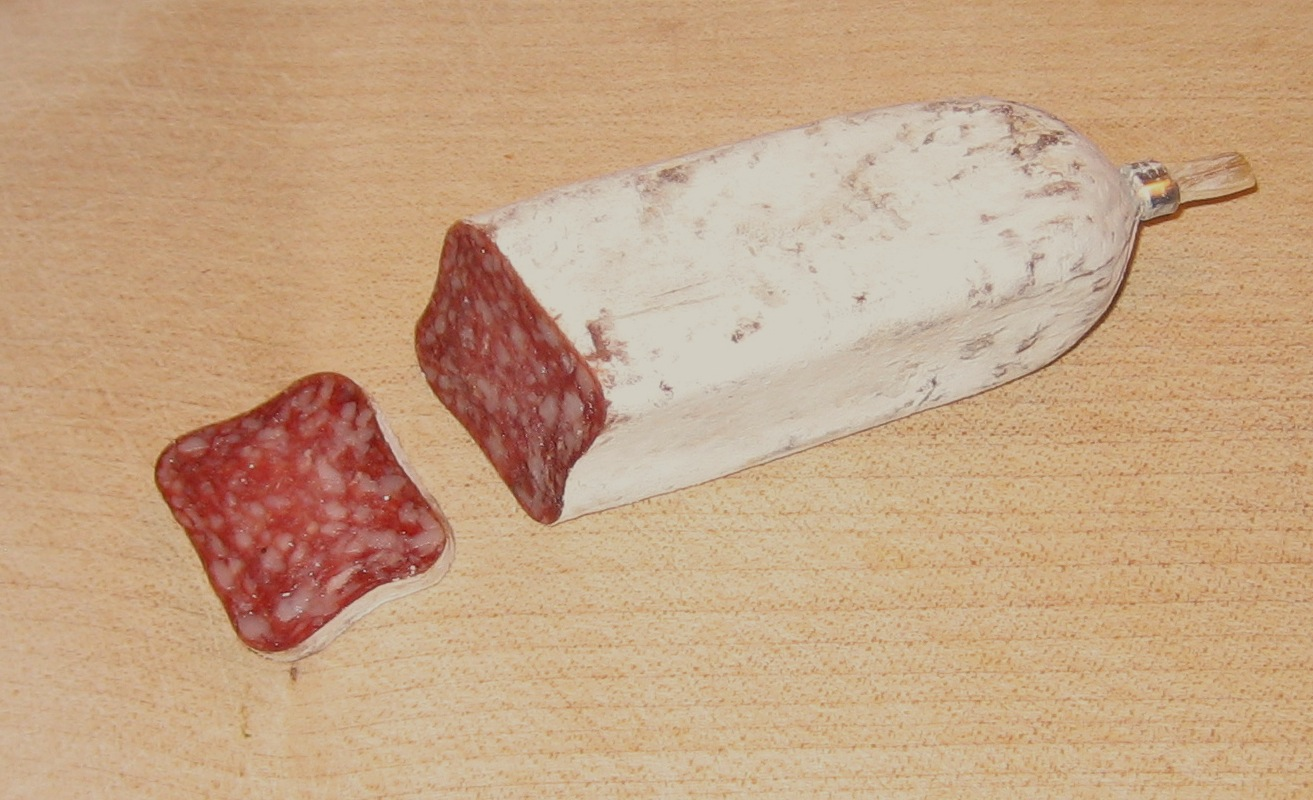
  Salziz (Grisons)
- La Longeole, Geneva sausage, unsmoked, IGP
- Luganighe, cooked pork sausage, Ticino, Grisons, northern Italy
- Luganighetta, pork sausage for roasting, Italian-speaking Ticino and Grisons
- Mortadella di fegato, pork liver mortadella made from pork, two versions: one to be eaten raw, the other cooked.
- Ramswurst, raw smoked pork and beef sausage
- Randenwurst, (red root sausage), dried sausage with red beet, from the Upper Valais.

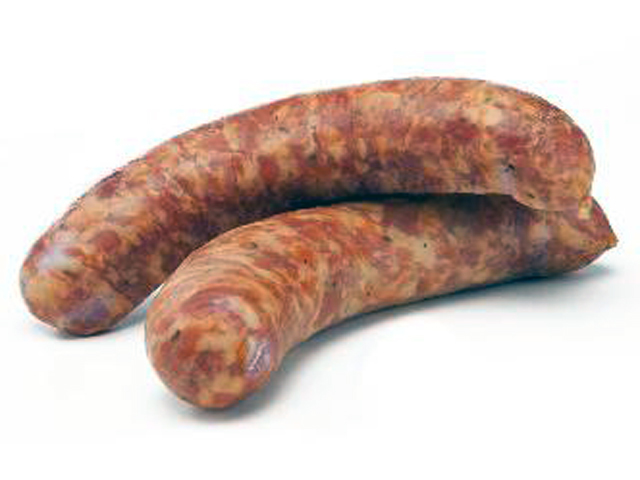
Ajoie sausages

- Salami made from beef, pork, game, etc.
- Salsiz (de), air-dried pork and beef sausage, cut into thin slices and usually eaten raw, Graubünden
- Dry sausages that may contain pork, beef, mutton, lamb, goat, horse or game meat seasoned with garlic, spices, wormwood, hemp, fir buds, blueberries, hazelnuts, walnuts, etc.
- Valais dry sausages, dry or beef sausages or vegetable sausages, usually all three at once.
- Roast sausage, Bratwurst (de) in German-speaking Switzerland, made from pork or sometimes wild boar. Stuffed into thinner casings and shaped into small sausages, it's called chipolata in French-speaking Switzerland.
- Saucisse aux choux (cabbage sausage), IGP Vaudoise sausage
- Ajoie PGI sausage
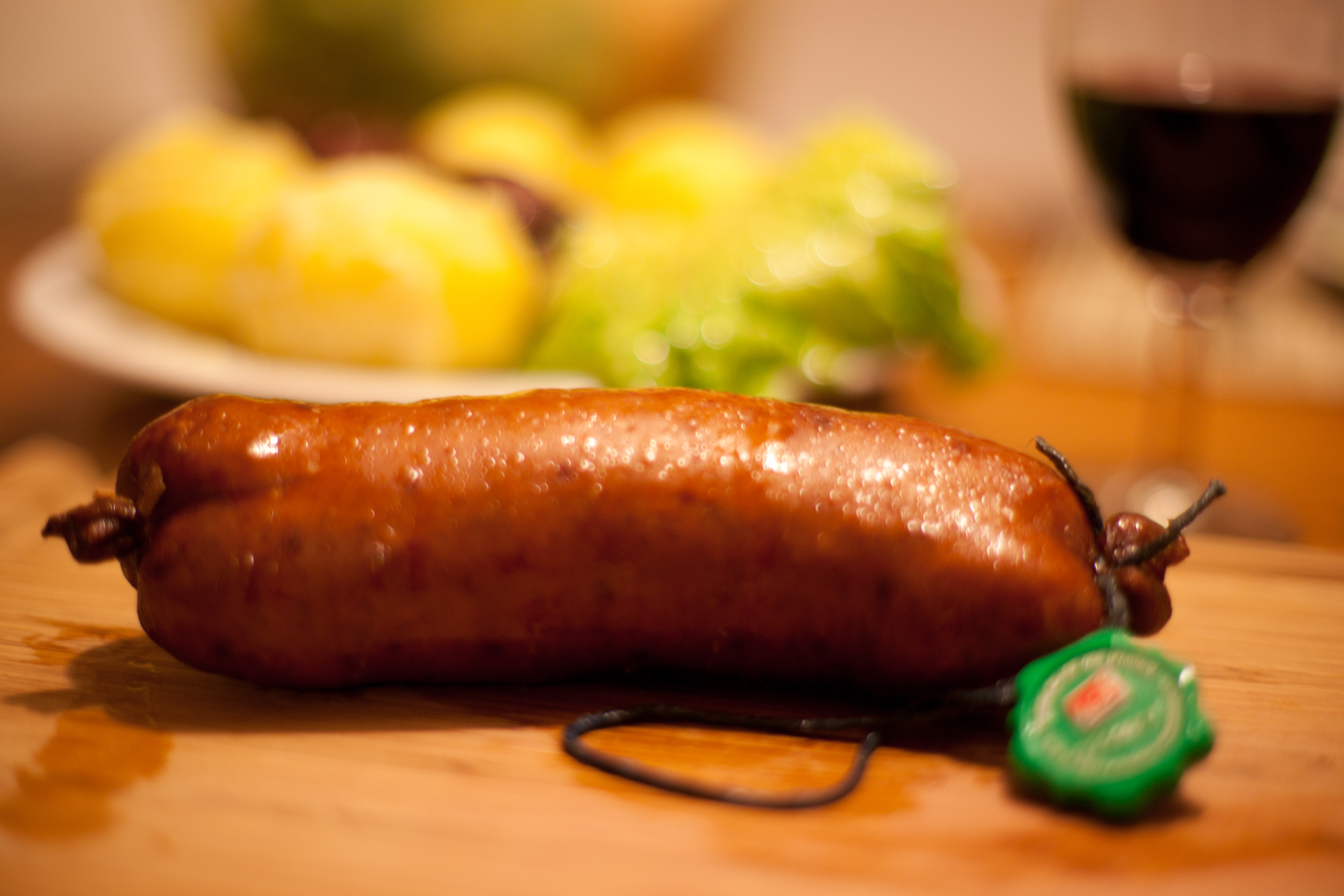
  Waldensian sausage
- Dry sausages
- Sausages,
- Fribourg sausage, often smoked "à la borne
- Neuchâtel sausage and IGP Neuchâtel sausage
- Payerne sausage
- Dry sausages made mostly from pork and/or beef, with garlic, pepper and herbs.
- IGP Vaudois sausage
- Schwartenwurst, raw sausage with interrupted maturation, Berne and Grisons
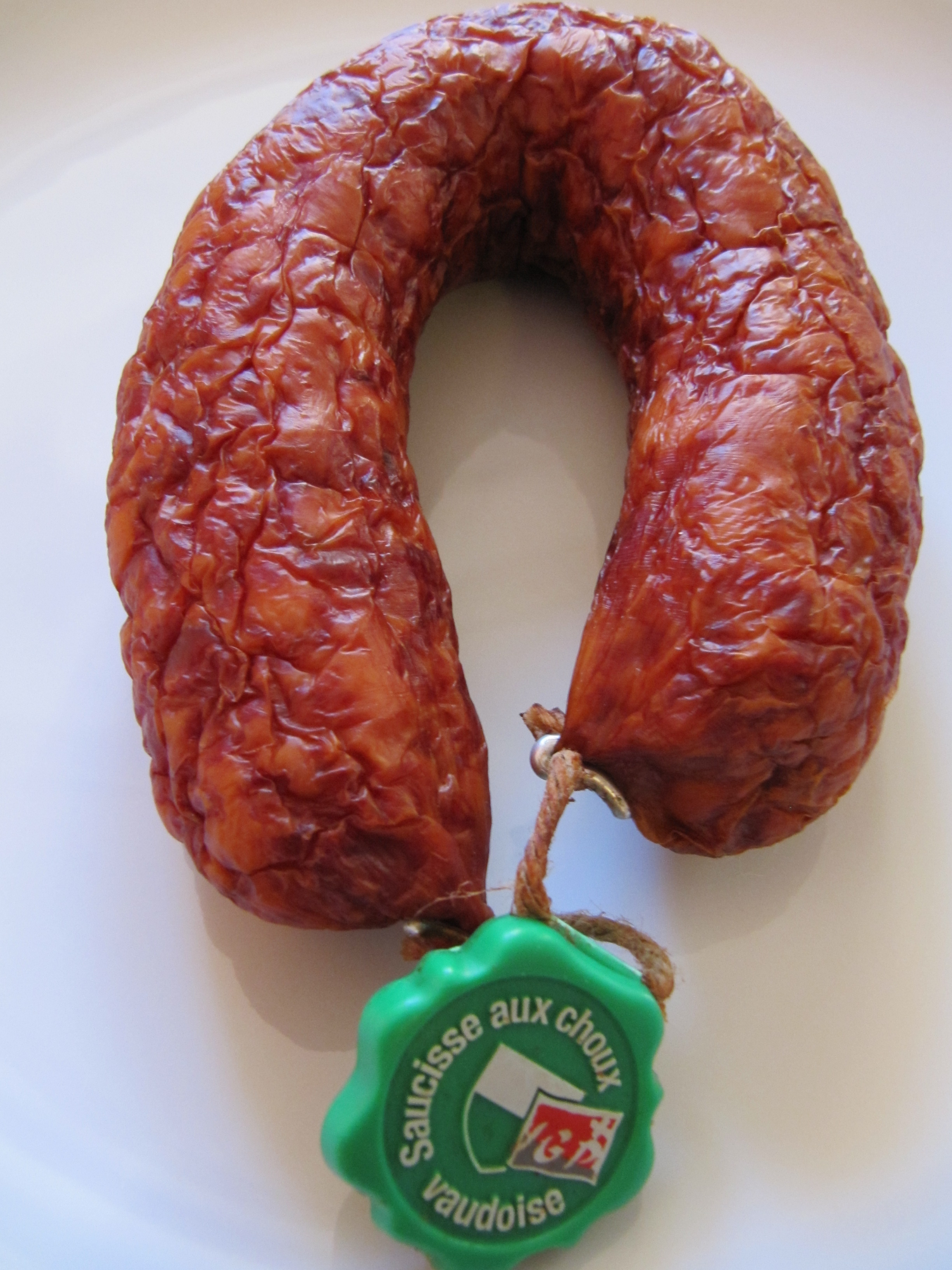
  Waldensian cabbage sausage
- St. Gallen veal sausage, unsmoked scalded white sausage, lean meat content at least 50% veal; St. Gallen and all Switzerland (industry and butchery)
- Schüblig (de) from St. Gallen, smoked boiled sausage made from beef, pork and bacon
- Augustiner Schüblig, cooked red sausage made from beef, pork and bacon, similar to cervelas but larger and with coarser pieces of meat. It is red because of the color of the bath in which the intestine is immersed, Schlieren (Canton of Zurich)
- Bauernschüblig (Schüblig paysan, peasant sausage or a smoked sausage), raw sausages made from beef and pork that resemble gendarmes, German-speaking Switzerland (Eastern Switzerland, regions around Zurich, parts of the cantons of Aargau and Lucerne, the cantons of Basel and Bern)
- Bassersdorfer Schüblig, (Schwartz Wurst), black cooked sausage made from beef, pork and bacon, similar to cervelas but larger and with coarser pieces of meat, Bassersdorf (Canton of Zurich)
- Toggenburger Bauernschüblig, raw peasant sausage made from cow's and pig's meat, usually eaten raw, Toggenburg
- Cervelas (Stumpen) from St. Gallen, very smoky cooked sausage made from cow's and pig's meat. St. Gallen and neighboring regions of eastern Switzerland.
- Salame, salami, pork sausage eaten raw, Ticino
- Urner Hauswurst, Urner home-made sausage, raw sausage to be eaten raw, made from cow, pig and goat meat and/or deer meat, Uri.

== See also ==
- Animal welfare
- Federal Office for Agriculture
- List of mammals of Switzerland
- Hunting in Switzerland
