= Capuns =

Stuffed chard leaves from Swiss cuisine

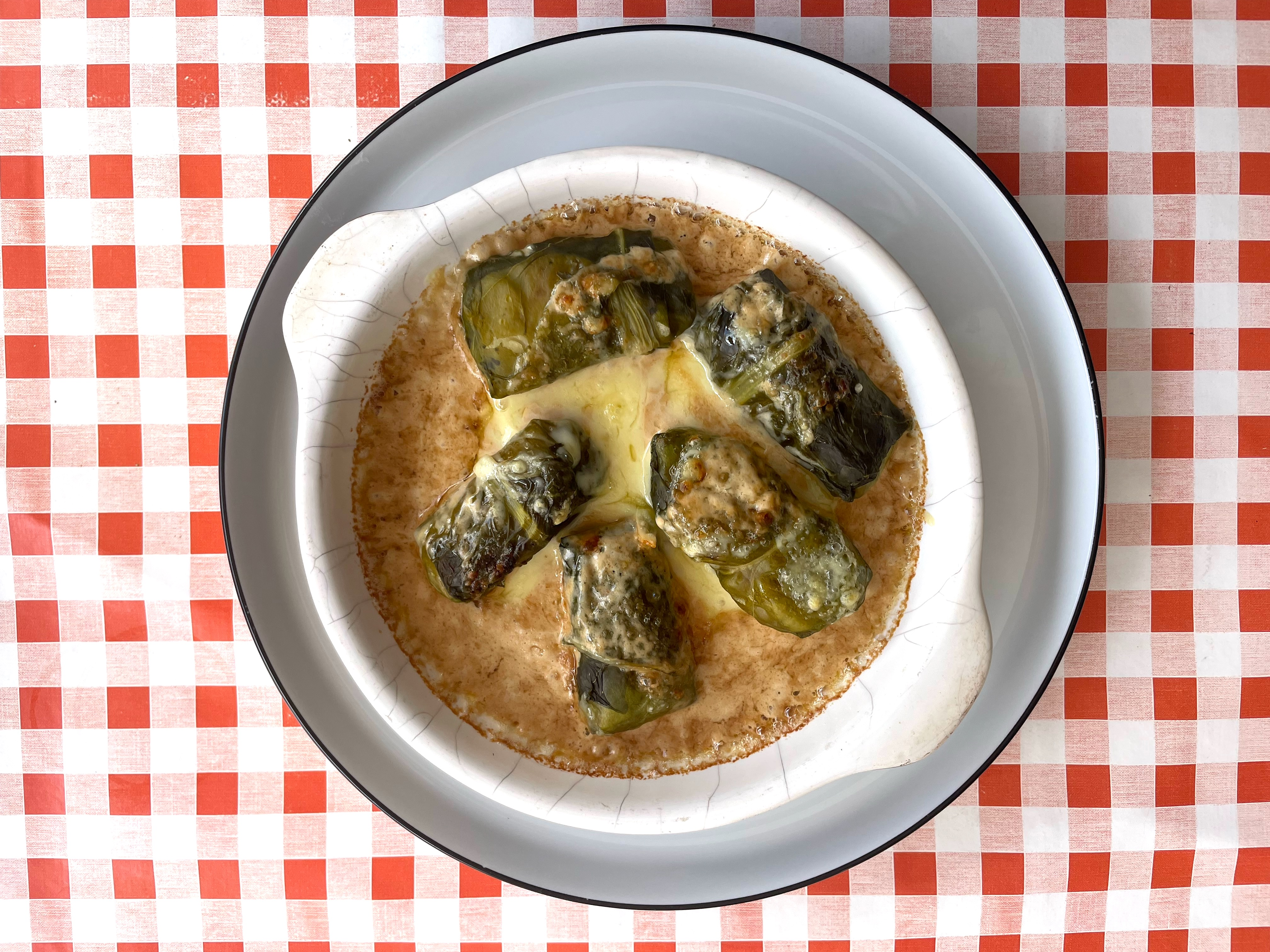
- Type: Dumpling
- Place of origin: Switzerland
- Region or state: Graubünden
- Main ingredients: Spätzle dough, dried meat, chard leaf

Capuns is a traditional food from the canton of Graubünden in Switzerland, predominantly made in the eastern part. They are made from Spätzle dough with pieces of dried meat, such as Bündnerfleisch and/or Salsiz, and rolled in a chard leaf. They are boiled in a gravy of bouillon, milk and water and served covered with grated cheese.

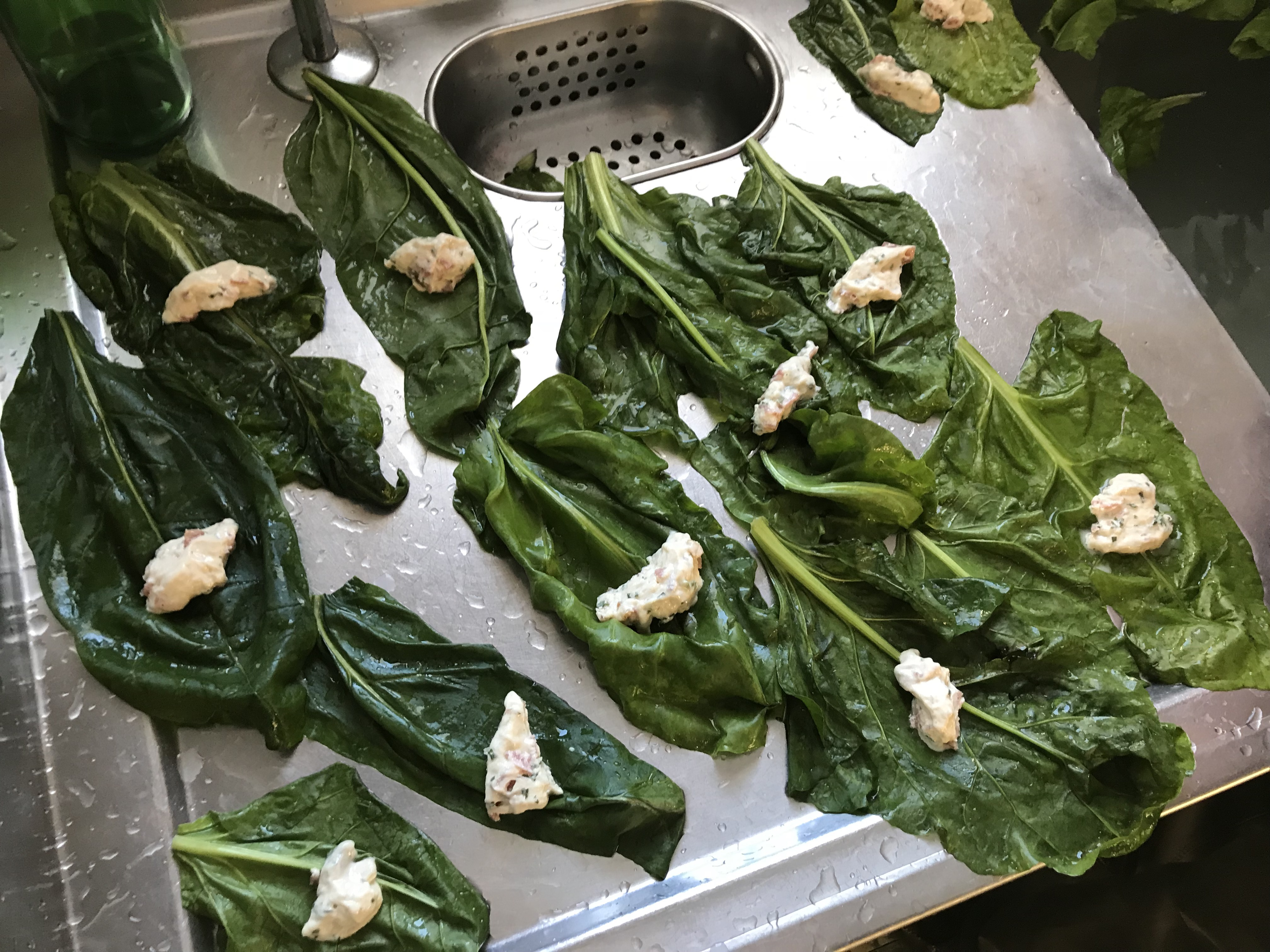
Preparation of Capuns

== See also ==
- Maluns, another typical dish of Graubünden
- Cabbage rolls
