= Maluns =

Swiss potato dish

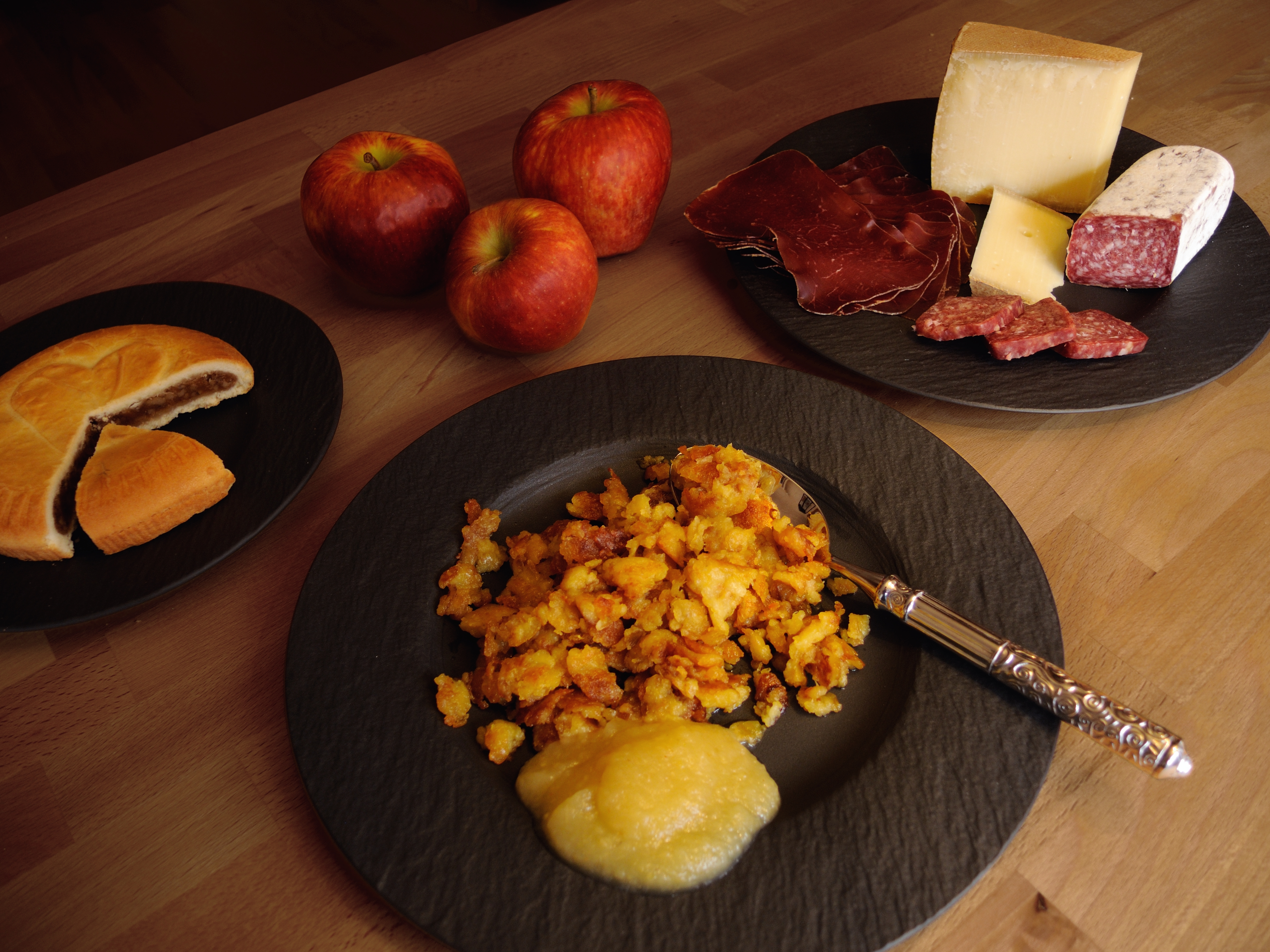
- A plate of Maluns and apple compote, served along with various specialities of the Grisons, notably Alp cheese, dried meat and Salsiz (top right)
- Type: Main dish
- Place of origin: Switzerland
- Region or state: Grisons
- Main ingredients: Potatoes, flour, butter

Maluns are a traditional dish of the Grisons, essentially made of potatoes.

== Recipe ==
Maluns are prepared from boiled potatoes (usually one day before cooking), peeled and grated, then mixed with some flour in proportions varying according to the recipe. The resulting mixture is then slowly fried in butter and stirred constantly until it forms small golden balls or crumbs. Maluns are usually served with apple compote, which can be made with other fruits depending on the season. Other common accompaniments include various regional cheeses and cured meats, such as Salsiz (dry sausage) or Grisons Meat. They are also traditionally eaten along with milk coffee.

Although seemingly easy, the preparation of Maluns requires time, especially the final part which can require more than 40 minutes of constant presence depending on the quality of the potatoes. The writer and journalist Hanns U. Christen recommends, in his book Das Kochbuch aus der Schweiz, to cook Maluns at least twice before offering them to guests. Maluns are usually served as a main dish as they provide a rich meal even without the addition of meat.

== History ==
Potatoes (as well as maize) were introduced in the Grisons by Johann Gubert Rudolf von Salis in the 18th century, at Marschlins Castle, which is located in the vicinity of Landquart.

The first potatoes were planted as ornamentals at Marschlins in 1717. It was not until 1758 that potatoes were served there for the first time at a castle dinner, but with very mixed success. However, a little over a decade later, a famine favored its consumption, so that by the end of the century, the potato was cultivated in all favorable regions of the Grisons. At that time, the habit of cooking maluns spread among the peasants of the canton, to the point that some of them were given the nickname of "Magliamaluns" or "Malauner", which means "eaters of maluns".

The Romansh word "maluns" descends from the Latin micula/miculones: "little crumbs". Maluns are also known as Bündner Kartoffelribel in German.

== See also ==
- Capuns, another traditional dish of the Grisons
- Rösti, a traditional potato dish of Switzerland
