= La Pierreuse =

Coordinates: 46.4441374°N 7.1559909°E

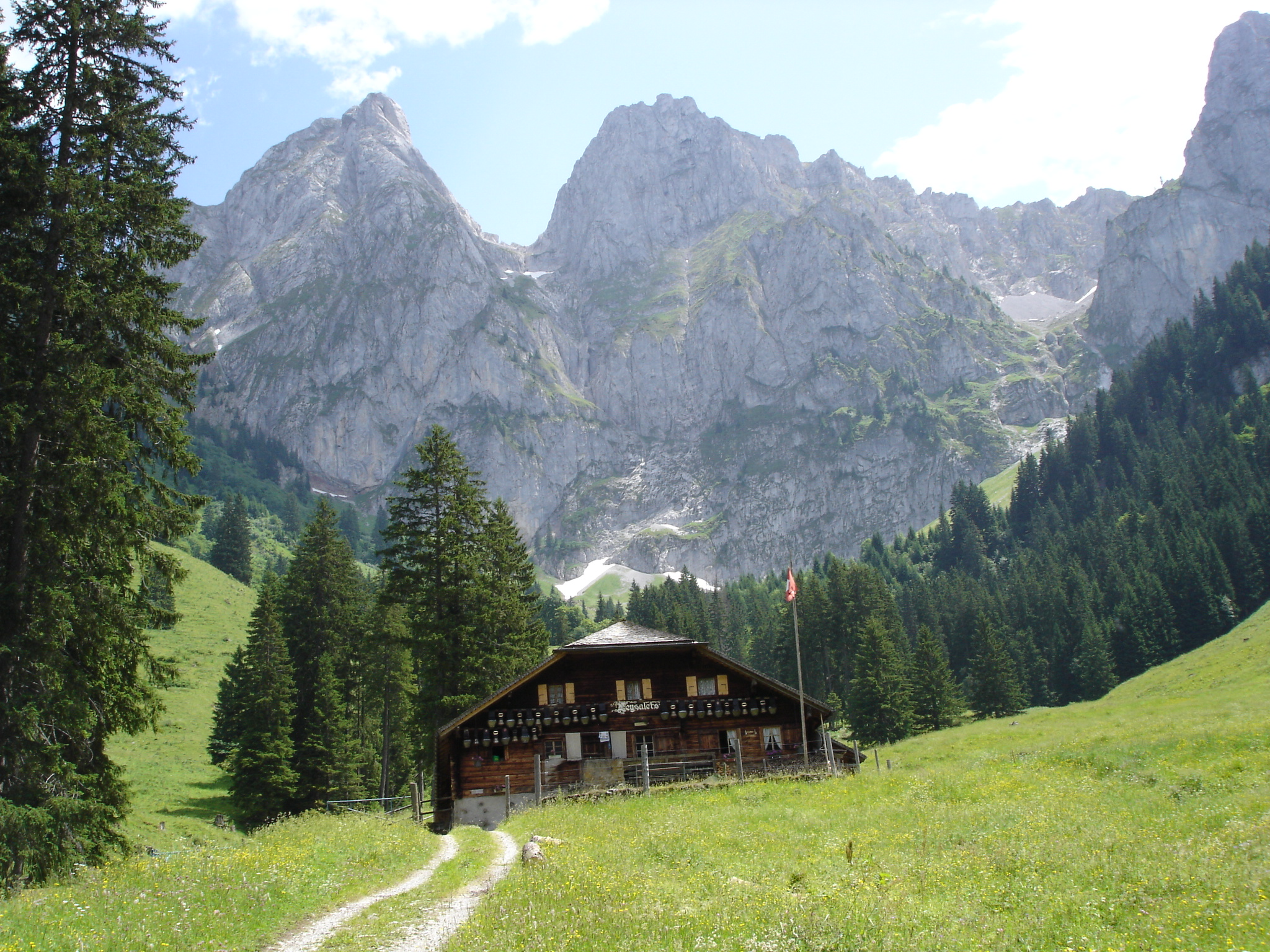
- Entry to la Pierreuse nature reserve
- Interactive map of La Pierreuse
- Type: Nature reserve
- Location: Vaud, Switzerland
- Area: 34 square km
- Created: 1945

La Pierreuse (meaning "stony place") is a large and important nature reserve in the Swiss Alps, in the canton of Vaud. It covers more than 30 square km south of the Saane in the district of Pays-d'Enhaut. It is located at the foot of the Gummfluh.

== See also ==
- Nature parks in Switzerland
