= Le Rubli =

Mountain in Switzerland

- Rüeblihorn
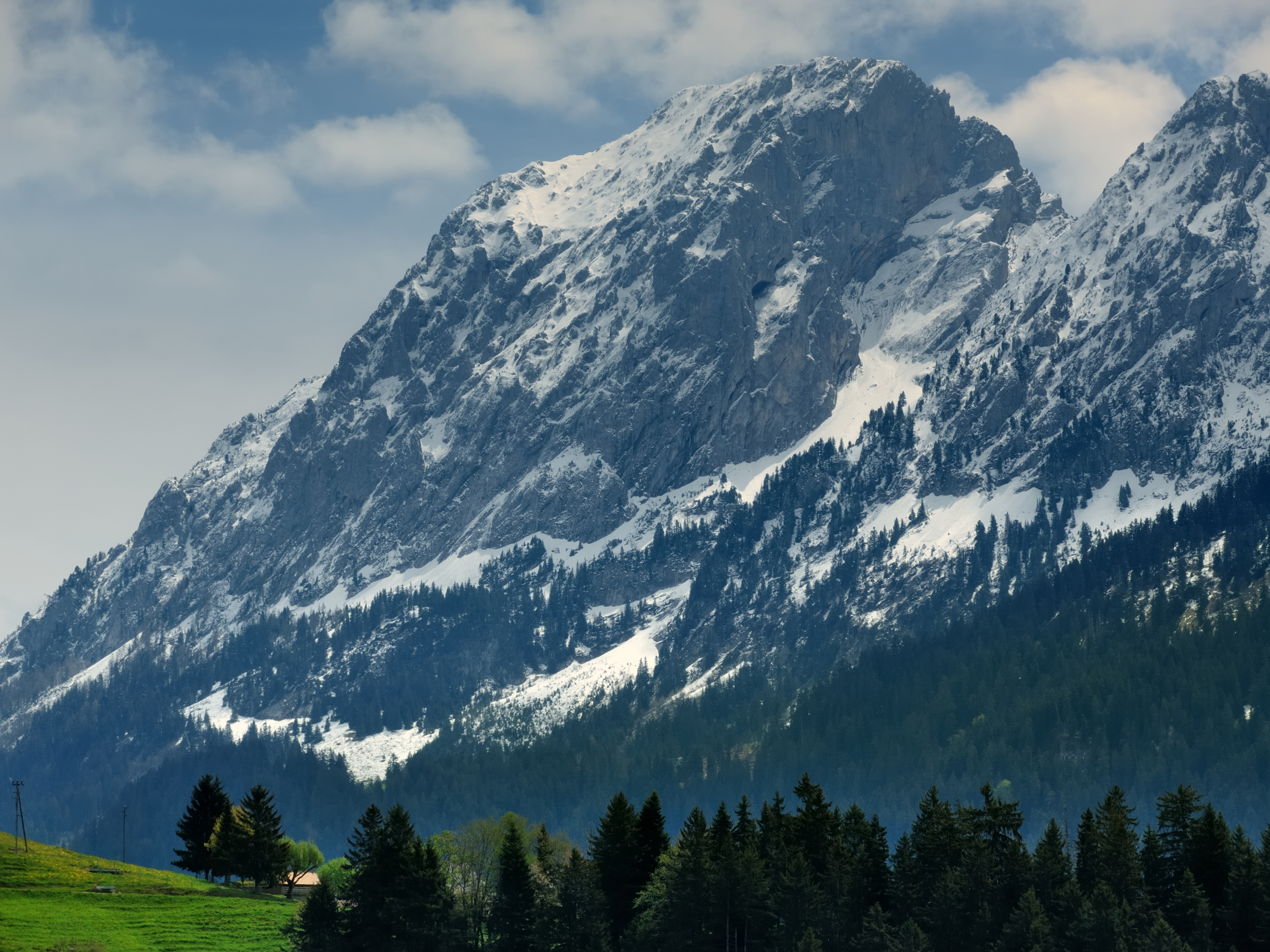
- Le Rubli from Château-d'Œx

Highest point
- Elevation: 2,285 m (7,497 ft)
- Prominence: 251 m (823 ft)
- Parent peak: Gummfluh
- Coordinates: 46°27′47.3″N 7°12′38.6″E

Geography
- Location within Switzerland
- Location: Vaud, Switzerland
- Parent range: Vaud Alps

Le Rubli (or Rüeblihorn) is a 2,285 metre high mountain in the western Bernese Alps, overlooking Rougemont in the canton of Vaud, near the border with the canton of Berne. Le Rubli has steep faces and its summit is relatively difficult to access. A via ferrata starts near the gondola station of the Videmanette (2,160 m).

A cable car travels its western face.
