= Rougemont, Switzerland =

Rougemont
- Municipality
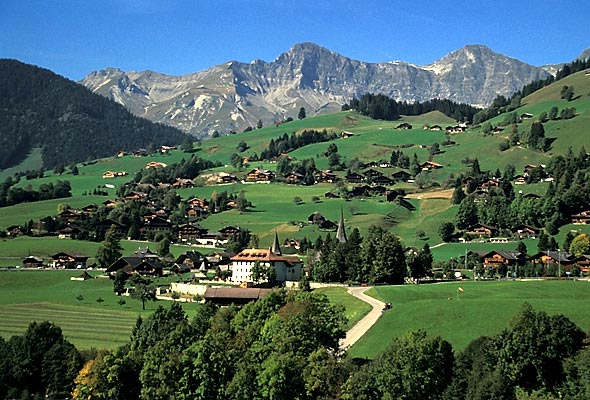

- Flag Coat of arms
- Location of Rougemont
- Location within Switzerland Location within Canton of Vaud
- Coordinates: 46°29′N 7°13′E
- Country: Switzerland
- Canton: Vaud
- District: Pays-d'Enhaut

Government
  - Mayor: Syndic

Area
  - Total: 48.56 km^{2} (18.75 sq mi)
- Elevation: 1,007 m (3,304 ft)

Population (2003)
  - Total: 905
  - Density: 18.6/km^{2} (48.3/sq mi)
- Time zone: UTC+01:00 (CET)
  - Summer (DST): UTC+02:00 (CEST)
- Postal code: 1659
- SFOS number: 5843
- ISO 3166 code: CH-VD
- Surrounded by: Château-d'Œx, Saanen (BE), Val-de-Charmey (FR)
- Website: www.rougemont.ch

Rougemont (French pronunciation: [ʁuʒmɔ̃]) is a municipality in the Pays-d'Enhaut of the canton of Vaud in Switzerland.

== History ==
Rougemont is first mentioned in 1115 as Rubeus Mons and Rogemot. The name of the village also appears in various forms in medieval chronicles: Rubeimontis, Rogemont, Rubeo monte, Rogo mons, and Rojomont. The name stems from the red rock outcroppings north of the village, and was probably first settled by a religious order coming from Cluny in France, which had received the land in 1080 from the Count of Gruyère. In 1569, the priory was replaced by the château of Rougemont, which became the residence of the bailiffs of Bern, who succeeded the Count of Gruyère. The area became part of the canton of Vaud in 1798.

Diana, Princess of Wales lived for some time at the city, in the late 1970s while a student at the Institut Alpin Videmanette.

== Geography ==
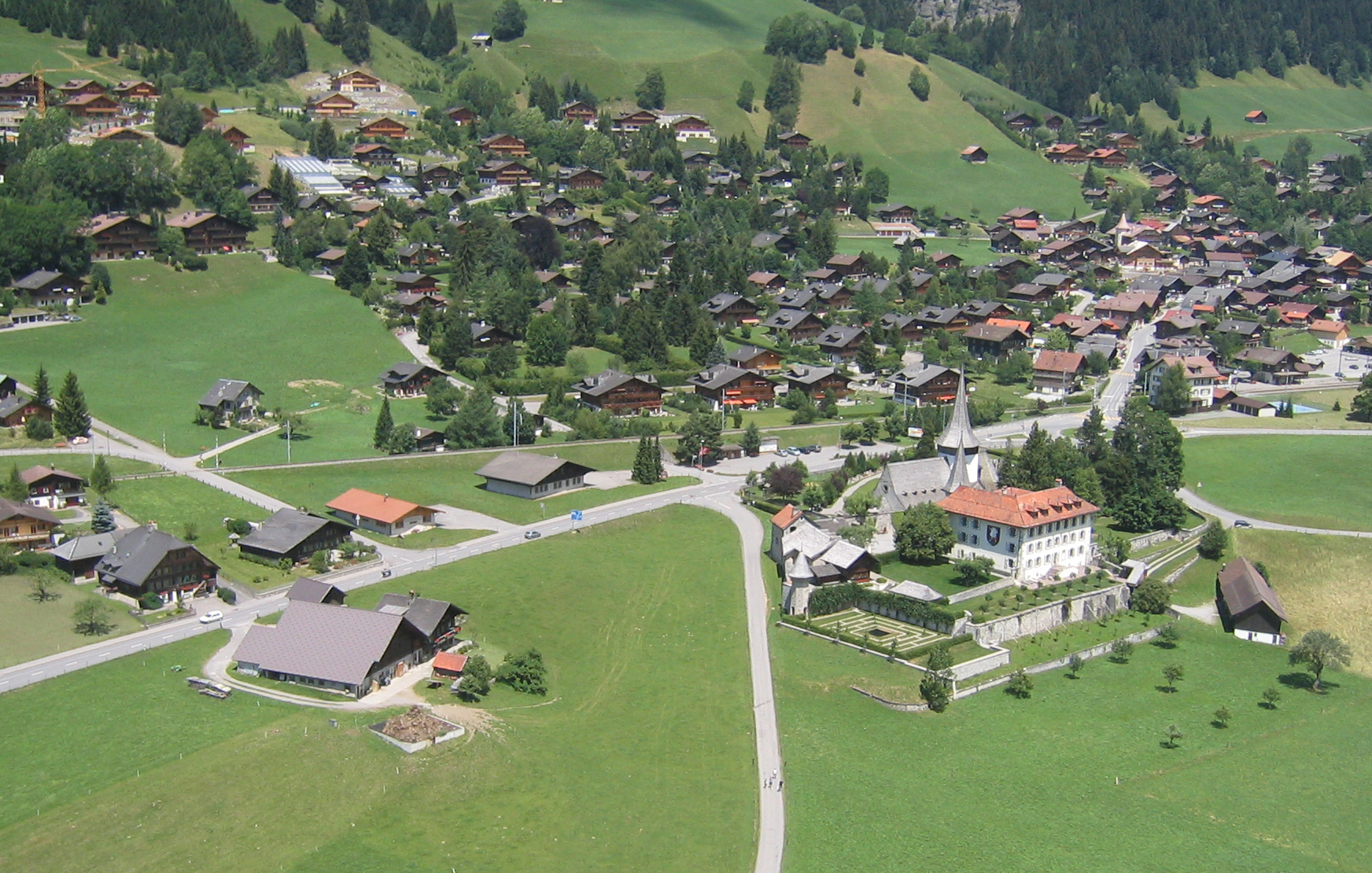
Aerial view of Rougemont

Rougemont has an area, as of 2009, of 48.5 square kilometers (18.7 mi^{2}). Of this area, 23.19 km^{2} (8.95 mi^{2}) or 47.8% is used for agricultural purposes, while 16.54 km^{2} (6.39 mi^{2}) or 34.1% is forested. Of the rest of the land, 1.31 km^{2} (0.51 mi^{2}) or 2.7% is settled (buildings or roads), 0.2 km^{2} (0.077 mi^{2}) or 0.4% is either rivers or lakes and 7.31 km^{2} (2.82 mi^{2}) or 15.1% is unproductive land.

Of the built up area, housing and buildings made up 1.4% and transportation infrastructure made up 1.0%. Out of the forested land, 28.3% of the total land area is heavily forested and 4.2% is covered with orchards or small clusters of trees. Of the agricultural land, 0.0% is used for growing crops and 7.4% is pastures and 40.4% is used for alpine pastures. All the water in the municipality is flowing water. Of the unproductive areas, 9.1% is unproductive vegetation and 5.9% is too rocky for vegetation.

The municipality was part of the Pays-d'Enhaut District until it was dissolved on 31 August 2006, and Rougemont became part of the new district of Riviera-Pays-d'Enhaut.

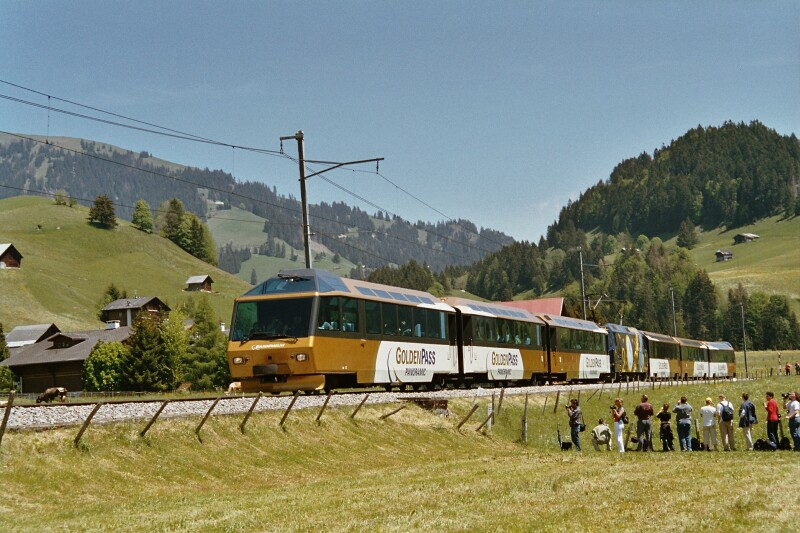
Golden Pass train near Rougemont

Rougemont is located in the Pays d'Enhaut (high country) of the canton of Vaud, high in the Alps. The territory of the municipality is largely forested and mountainous. It is located next to the river going down the valley.

The municipality abuts the cantons of Bern and Fribourg. It is at the crossroads of the Bulle-Montbovon, and Aigle-Thun roads. To reach Aigle and the valley of the Rhone, the road crosses Col des Mosses. To reach Thun and the valley of the Aare, the road crosses Saanenmöser Pass.

Rougemont stretches along the banks of the Sarine. The following valleys are part of the municipality: Les Ciernes-Picats, La Manche, and Les Fenils. It consists of the villages of Rougemont and Flendruz and numerous hamlets including Le Vanel and Ciernes-Picat.

== Demographics ==
Rougemont has a population (as of December 2020) of 864. As of 2008, 25.3% of the population are resident foreign nationals. Over the last 10 years (1999–2009) the population has changed at a rate of -3.3%. It has changed at a rate of -0.2% due to migration and at a rate of -3% due to births and deaths.

Most of the population (as of 2000) speaks French (659 or 73.1%), with German being second most common (150 or 16.6%) and English being third (34 or 3.8%). There are 12 people who speak Italian.

The age distribution, as of 2009, in Rougemont is; 76 children or 8.4% of the population are between 0 and 9 years old and 78 teenagers or 8.6% are between 10 and 19. Of the adult population, 97 people or 10.7% of the population are between 20 and 29 years old. 110 people or 12.1% are between 30 and 39, 139 people or 15.3% are between 40 and 49, and 117 people or 12.9% are between 50 and 59. The senior population distribution is 137 people or 15.1% of the population are between 60 and 69 years old, 86 people or 9.5% are between 70 and 79, there are 59 people or 6.5% who are between 80 and 89, and there are 11 people or 1.2% who are 90 and older.

As of 2000, there were 311 people who were single and never married in the municipality. There were 468 married individuals, 73 widows or widowers and 49 individuals who are divorced.

As of 2000, there were 409 private households in the municipality, and an average of 2.1 persons per household. There were 153 households that consist of only one person and 17 households with five or more people. Out of a total of 424 households that answered this question, 36.1% were households made up of just one person and there was 1 adult who lived with their parents. Of the rest of the households, there are 118 married couples without children, 102 married couples with children. There were 29 single parents with a child or children. There were 6 households that were made up of unrelated people and 15 households that were made up of some sort of institution or another collective housing.

In 2000 there were 281 single family homes (or 52.3% of the total) out of a total of 537 inhabited buildings. There were 159 multi-family buildings (29.6%), along with 69 multi-purpose buildings that were mostly used for housing (12.8%) and 28 other use buildings (commercial or industrial) that also had some housing (5.2%).

In 2000, a total of 393 apartments (39.5% of the total) were permanently occupied, while 547 apartments (55.0%) were seasonally occupied and 55 apartments (5.5%) were empty. As of 2009, the construction rate of new housing units was 5.5 new units per 1000 residents. The vacancy rate for the municipality, in 2010, was 2.14%.

The historical population is given in the following chart:

== Heritage sites of national significance ==
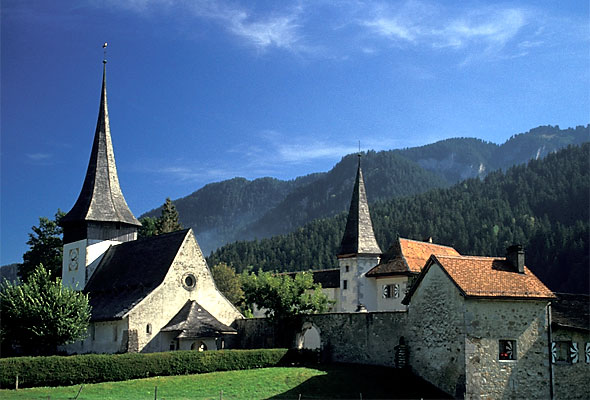
Church of Saint-Nicolas

The Swiss Reformed Church of Saint-Nicolas de Myre is listed as a Swiss heritage site of national significance. Both the village of Rougemont and the hamlet of Flendruz are part of the Inventory of Swiss Heritage Sites.

=== Architecture ===
The village is built essentially on a single east–west axis, with houses on both sides of the street facing south to catch the sun. There is room for flower and vegetable gardens. All the houses are typical chalets, which are very close to one another; sometimes their roofs touch. Some of the homes are over 300 years old.

The former priory chapel of Saint-Nicolas is now a Protestant church. The church is in the form of a cross and has retained some of its romanesque elements. It was remodeled between 1585 and 1587, when the choir was replaced with three semi-circular apses. The roof in the typical style of the Bernese Oberland dates from the 17th century.

Next to the church stands the château of Rougemont, which was built in 1572 and remodeled between 1756 and 1759. It has a tower and an inner court. The church, the château, and the remaining city wall are designated historic buildings.

== Politics ==
In the 2007 federal election the most popular party was the SVP which received 40.46% of the vote. The next three most popular parties were the FDP (22.35%), the SP (13.04%) and the LPS Party (9.65%). In the federal election, a total of 186 votes were cast, and the voter turnout was 31.2%.

== Economy ==
Until the end of the 19th century, the area was essentially agricultural, with the dairy industry predominant. The arrival of hotels was greatly furthered by the first railway, the Montreux–Lenk im Simmental line, which reached Rougemont in 1905.

The situation of the municipality on the Golden Pass railway line between Château-d'Oex and Gstaad, both well-known ski resorts, helped to bring Rougemont out of its isolation and make it a tourist destination in its own right. A cable car connects the town to La Videmanette station (2151 m) on Le Rubli, from which skiers can access a network of pistes which allow them to either ski down to the base station in Rougemont or connect to the Eggli mountain (1557 m), from which they can ski down to either Saanen or Gstaad.

Most of the land of the municipality is in agriculture or forest, some 100 hectares being owned by the municipality.

As of 2010, Rougemont had an unemployment rate of 2.7%. As of 2008, there were 79 people employed in the primary economic sector and about 36 businesses involved in this sector. 70 people were employed in the secondary sector and there were 18 businesses in this sector. 145 people were employed in the tertiary sector, with 44 businesses in this sector. There were 425 residents of the municipality who were employed in some capacity, of which females made up 42.6% of the workforce.

In 2008 the total number of full-time equivalent jobs was 243. The number of jobs in the primary sector was 59, all of which were in agriculture. The number of jobs in the secondary sector was 66 of which 29 or (43.9%) were in manufacturing and 37 (56.1%) were in construction. The number of jobs in the tertiary sector was 118. In the tertiary sector; 40 or 33.9% were in wholesale or retail sales or the repair of motor vehicles, 12 or 10.2% were in the movement and storage of goods, 21 or 17.8% were in a hotel or restaurant, 1 was in the information industry, 1 was the insurance or financial industry, 13 or 11.0% were technical professionals or scientists, 3 or 2.5% were in education and 2 or 1.7% were in health care.

In 2000, there were 78 workers who commuted into the municipality and 174 workers who commuted away. The municipality is a net exporter of workers, with about 2.2 workers leaving the municipality for every one entering. Of the working population, 6.1% used public transportation to get to work, and 58.4% used a private car.

=== Local economy ===
The town is largely self-sufficient with a Proxy (grocery store), a bakery, a tourist information office and multiple other stores including restaurants and two antique stores.

== Religion ==
From the 2000 census, 148 or 16.4% were Roman Catholic, while 527 or 58.5% belonged to the Swiss Reformed Church. Of the rest of the population, there were 8 members of an Orthodox church (or about 0.89% of the population), there was 1 individual who belongs to the Christian Catholic Church, and there were 16 individuals (or about 1.78% of the population) who belonged to another Christian church. There was 1 individual who was Jewish, and 11 (or about 1.22% of the population) who were Islamic. There were 4 individuals who were Buddhist. 132 (or about 14.65% of the population) belonged to no church, are agnostic or atheist, and 61 individuals (or about 6.77% of the population) did not answer the question.

== Education ==
In Rougemont about 312 or (34.6%) of the population have completed non-mandatory upper secondary education, and 106 or (11.8%) have completed additional higher education (either university or a Fachhochschule). Of the 106 who completed tertiary schooling, 46.2% were Swiss men, 17.0% were Swiss women, 22.6% were non-Swiss men and 14.2% were non-Swiss women.

In the 2009/2010 school year there were a total of 72 students in the Rougemont school district. In the Vaud cantonal school system, two years of non-obligatory pre-school are provided by the political districts. During the school year, the political district provided pre-school care for a total of 817 children of which 456 children (55.8%) received subsidized pre-school care. The canton's primary school program requires students to attend for four years. There were 35 students in the municipal primary school program. The obligatory lower secondary school program lasts for six years and there were 32 students in those schools. There were also 5 students who were home schooled or attended another non-traditional school.

Rougemont is home to 1 museum, the Musée des minéraux et fossiles de Rougemont. In 2009 it was visited by 226 visitors (the average in previous years was 581).

As of 2000, there were 19 students in Rougemont who came from another municipality, while 70 residents attended schools outside the municipality.

== Notable people ==
- Edouard Bertholet, Grand Master of the Ordre Martiniste et Synarchique (OM&S)
