= Swiss sausages and cured meats =

Meat products of Switzerland

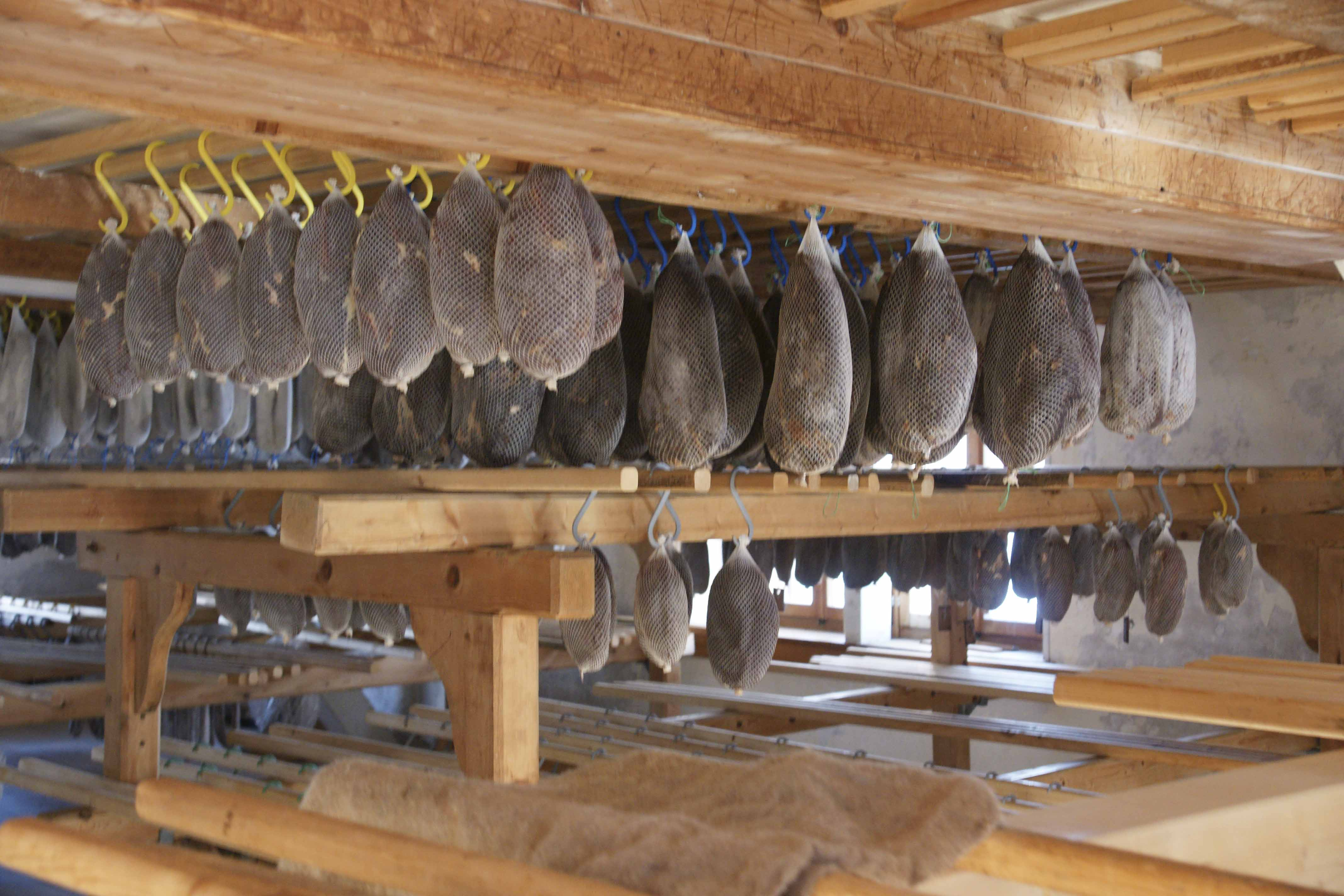
Production of dried meat in the Grisons

Sausages and cured meats are widely consumed in Switzerland. Meat in general is consumed on a daily basis, pork being particularly ubiquitous in Swiss cuisine. Preserving meat by smoking it or by adding salt has been done for millennia in Switzerland.

== History ==
Salt was hardly used as a means of preservation before the 2nd millennium BC, as the archaeological excavations carried out near salt resources seem to indicate. In the Lower Engadine, beef and pork were smoked as early as the 1st millennium BC; this is attested by pierced shoulder blades found on archeological sites. Smoking meat was probably common since the Neolithic, as livestock had to be slaughtered before the long winter season. This has not changed much throughout history: until the 19th century, animals were typically slaughtered in November, then cut up for salting, smoking and making sausages. Since the meat could not be refrigerated easily, its fresh consumption was limited to the time of slaughter.

Current meat-curing techniques and recipes are attested since the Late Middle Ages. In 1438, the statutes of the Butchers' Guild of St. Gallen mention a veal sausage. In Valais, dried meat specialities made from beef are attested in Münster's 1544 Cosmographia. The Walser people, who also occupied other Alpine territories, such as the Grisons and Ticino, are sometimes credited for this speciality. Grisons Meat is described by 18th century travellers, in particular by Johann Gottfried Ebel who notes that "the air is so dry from Sils to St. Moritz between the months of October and March that meat is dried instead of being smoked".

Raw ham was probably also produced since the Late Middle Ages, especially in southern Switzerland. While drying techniques are common in Valais, Ticino and the Grisons, smoking techniques are more common in northern Switzerland. These differences reflect those between northern and southern Europe.

== Meat products ==
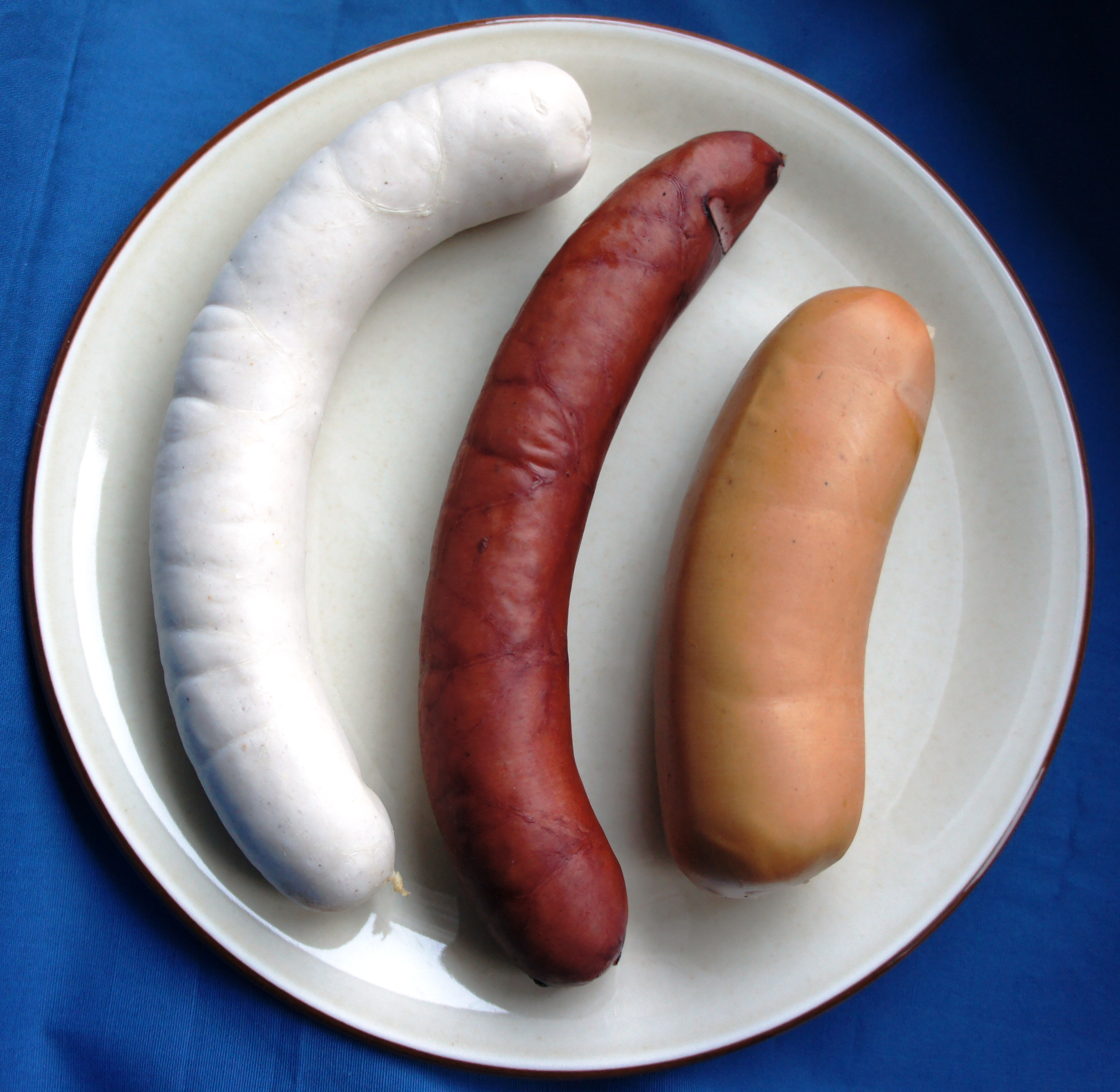
Cooked grilling sausages

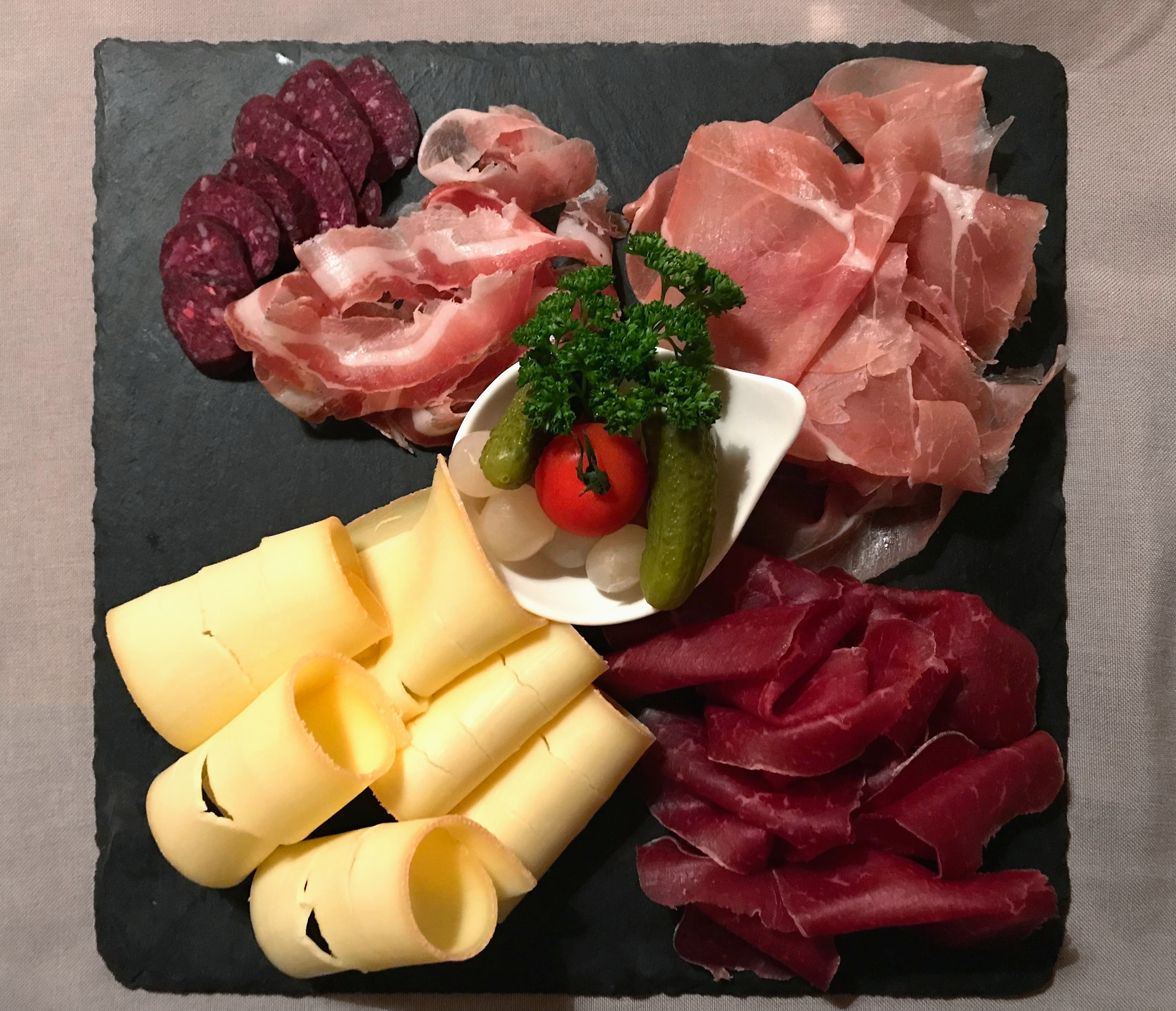
A variety of cured meats from Valais

Switzerland has a large number of regional meat products and specialties that constitute an important gastronomic heritage. The cultural and climatic diversity of the country accounts for a large part. In French-speaking Switzerland, the term charcuterie is employed, whereas in Italian-speaking Switzerland, the term salumi is employed.

The products listed below are inscribed in the Culinary Heritage of Switzerland. They are essentially made of pork, unless specified.

=== Sausages ===
Sausages are primarily made of pork. Three types are made in Switzerland: grilling (blanched) sausages, raw sausages and cooking sausages. Among cooking sausages is also a subcategory of raw sausages with interrupted maturation (*), often called saucissons.

- Grilling sausages: Appenzeller Siedwurst, Berner Zungenwurst, Cervelat, Emmentalerli, Frauenfelder Salzissen, Glarner Kalberwurst, Kümmelwurst, Schüblig, Schützenwurst, St. Galler Bratwurst, St. Galler Stumpen
- Raw sausages: Appenzeller Pantli, Bauernschüblig, Gumpesel, Kartoffelwurst, Landjäger, Salame ticinese, Salsiz, Saucisses sèches valaisannes, Saucisse aux racines rouges, Urner Hauswurst
- Cooking sausages: Blutwurst, Boutefas*, Churer Beinwurst, Cicitt (goat), Emmentaler Bauernbratwurst, Leberwurst, Longeole*, Luganighe, Saucisse aux choux*, Saucisse d'Ajoie*, Saucisson neuchâtelois*, Saucisson vaudois*, Schwartenwurst, Schweinsbratwurst, Schweinswürstli

=== Cured meats ===
- Pork:
  - Ham: Bauernschinken, Bündner Rohschinken, Jambon cru du Valais, Jambon de la Borne, Prosciutto crudo della Mesolcina, Prosciutto crudo Piora
  - Other: Bauernspeck, Coppa, Fleischkäse, Krakauer, Lardo, Lard sec du Valais, Mortadella di fegato, Pancetta piana
- Beef: Appenzeller Mostbröckli, Bündnerfleisch, Brési, Carne secca ticinese, Tigets, Viande séchée du Valais
- Other meats: Lammlidji (lamb), Violini di capra e camoscio (goat or chamois)

== See also ==
- Agriculture in Switzerland
