= Edouard Bertholet =

- Born: 1883
- Died: 1965 (aged 81–82)
- Occupation: Doctor
- Known for: The Grand Master of the Ordre Martiniste et Synarchique (OM&S)

Edouard Bertholet (1883–1965), known as Sar Alkmaion, was the Grand Master of the Ordre Martiniste et Synarchique (OM&S) from 1953 to 1965. He was preceded by Victor Blanchard, founder of the Order, who was the Grand Master from 1921 till his death in 1965.

== Biography ==
Edouard was born in Switzerland at Rougemont, in the district of Vaud, on June 8, 1883, He worked as a medical doctor, writer, musician, and esotericist.

When he left the University of Lausanne, holding his medical titles, he seemed to be the son of an era that Tame and Renan oriented towards: a skeptical positiveness, and he saw the sciences as the only concrete answer to human problems. This view was quickly confirmed by the problems around him. Confronted with the drama of alcoholism, he started an anti-alcoholic campaign that he pursued to the end of his life. He promised never again to taste wine.

A few years later, Auguste Forel taught him about hypnotism. He soon substituted it with magnetism a softer technique, better tolerated by the sick. The method was not original. A century earlier, Mesmer tried to codify a medical magnetism which started a school, and, a convention on magnetism was held in Paris in 1889, four years before Hector Durville formed his school of magnetism. But it still had to be officialised and regulated and that is to what Edouard Bertholet dedicated himself.

Using photographic plates, he engaged first in the detection of the luminescent rays emitted by one’s hands. He then experimented with its effects on plants, seeds of nuts, watercress and especially marrow (squash), two pots of which he isolated and watered in the same manner.

Every day, morning and evening, he magnetised one of these marrows, always the same one. At the end of two months, this one was taller, thicker and more vital than its counterpart. The doctor then reversed the magnetism. Leaving the treated plant, he started control on the other pot, which, two weeks later had already surpassed the first one, and which, having finished flowering at the end of a month, saw its flowers surpass its competitor’s by 6 centimetres.

These results prompted Berholet to try magnetism on humans. Bertholet decided to combine magnetism with fasting, the benefits of which he had long been advocating: “Disease is the consequence of a series of mistakes made against morality and hygiene and especially food hygiene”, he explained. “It constitutes a natural effort of the organism to get rid, by successive cleansing crises, the toxins and cellular poisons”. He himself experimented with it many times and he knew its benefits and its risks. He believed that some temperaments cannot stand such a treatment but that the revitalising magnetism would be the palliative preventing the headaches and the nauseous state which sometimes accompany fasting.

Bertholet practiced medicine at home in his house “Violettes” near the lake, facing the mountains above Lake Geneva. Every morning, he brought purges to his patients. He weighed them and prepared their potions. They then met in the garden where they played bowls and talked before going to the nearby beach. They often watched the doctor eating with his family, but they themselves were not hungry; within a few weeks they would see their general malaise, heart failure, nephritis and tuberculosis adenitis disappear. “Those who came to the Violettes on a stretcher” as Pierre-Genillard, the doctor’s nephew, remembers, “left on their feet”. They were replaced by new ones coming from all over the world, attracted by the ‘miraculous cures’ but also by Bertholet personally.

Bertholet was also a musician, and his patients sometimes heard late at night the echo of his violoncello carried by the myths of Tristan or Parsifal. He wrote “Les Guerisons Mystiques et le Magnetisme” (The Mystic Healings and Magnetism), “Le Retour a la Sante par le jeune” (The Return to Health by Fasting), one of almost 25 titles he wrote based on medicine or esotericism.

He invited the swamis Jathsvarananda and Sidheswaranda to the "Société Vaudoise d'Etudes Psychiques", which he founded in 1927. The society attracted a number of people, among them Alexandra David-Neel, who received treatment at the "Violettes" upon returning from Tibet. A specialist in Hinduism, Vedantism, and Taoism, Bertholet gave lectures on Ramakrishna, Randa, and Paramananda, while maintaining an interest in Western esoteric traditions associated with figures such as Paracelse, Louis-Claude de Saint-Martin, Stanislas de Guaita, Péladan, and Master Philippe de Lyon.

Dr Bertholet never met the latter though. But he wrote a “Reincarnation d’aprés le Maitre Phillipe de Lyon.” And judging the Sar Péladan, intellectual pole of the Master of Arbresle, to have been misunderstood during his time, he mentioned him in “La pensée et les secrets du Sar Joséphin Péladan” — four volumes which confer a new scope to the Rosicrucian ideas which impregnated the thought of the Sar. The doctor shared them so well that he revived in 1933 the “Ordre Ancien et Mystique de la Rose+Croix” (the Ancient and Mystic Order of the Rose+Cross).

It was at “Violettes” that he installed in his own house a small chapel where the Christ and the Virgin are next to the Buddha. The writer Jean Palaiseul says he saw Bertholet there “aureoled by his white beard of a prophet and by his ascetic life, standing in front of a big crucifix and wooden polychrome statues depicting the verses of the Koran, arranged around a candelabra with seven branches”.

Retired at Vevey during his last years, he composed his last work “Mystere et Ministere des Anges”.

It was from Bertholet (Sar Alkmaion) that Louis Bentin (Sar Gulion) received his authority as Sovereign Delegate General and Grand Master of Great Britain and the Commonwealth. Sar Gulion has been succeeded by Sar Patientious, who is still in charge today. He has already named his successor. A charter was issued which gave birth to the Hermetic Order of Martinists (H.O.M.). a separate order to the OMS but its constitution clearly states that it is subordinate to the O.M.S. The H.O.M. charter was only for the UK but they broke the Constitution issued to them by issuing charters to other countries, which caused many problems internally and many left and created new orders. It is not known whether H.O.M. is still functioning or not. In the old days H.O.M. and O.M.S. worked closely together. The O.M.S. is active but discreet and works silently as True Unknown Superiors. They have Heptads and Lodges in some countries outside the UK but while many countries use its name they have no affiliation with the authentic order.

Edouard Bertholet died on March 13, 1965, at nine o’clock in the morning.
