= Landjäger =

Type of semi-dried sausage

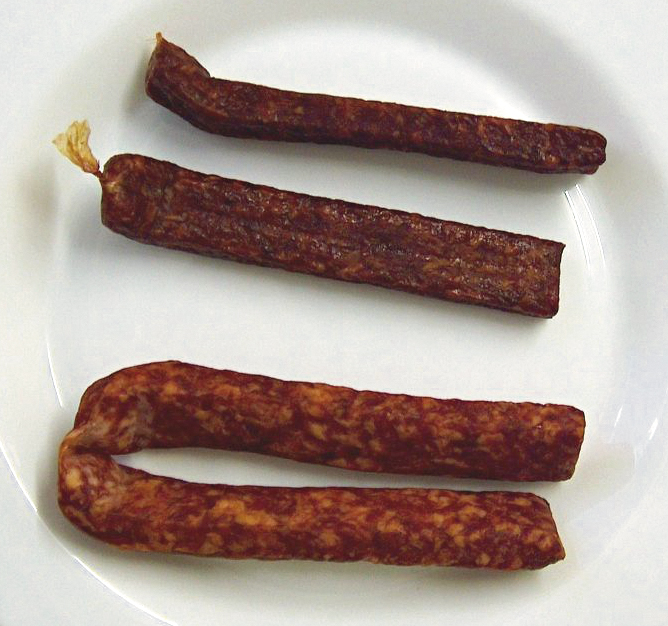
Different types of Landjäger

Landjäger is a semidried sausage traditionally made in Southern Germany, Austria, South Tyrol, Switzerland, and Alsace. It is popular as a snack food during activities such as hiking. It also has a history as soldier's food because it keeps without refrigeration and comes in single-meal portions. As a meal, landjäger sausage can be boiled and served with potatoes and fresh greens.

== Name ==
According to the Swiss German Dictionary, the name Landjäger was possibly derived from the dialect expression lang tige(n) 'smoked for a long time, air-cured for a long time.' The humorous reinterpretation in the sense of 'mounted police' may be inspired by comparing the stiffness of sausages with the perceived military rigidity of a police officer. The Alsatian and French names for smoked air-cured sausage, Gendarm and gendarme, are apparently translations of the folk-etymologized German name. "Jäger" should be remembered as a direct, simplified translation from German, meaning "hunter." This could explain the sausage's renewed popularity in the more northern and German-settled parts of the United States. Dedicated hunters consider landjägers as food for hunters taking game to carry on the traditions associated with a lifestyle from previous generations of hunters. A very similar semi-dried sausage known as salamino cacciatore (translation: "hunter's sausage") is traditionally produced in Central and Northern Italy.

== Ingredients ==
Landjäger sausages are made of roughly equal portions of beef and pork with lard, sugar, red wine, and spices, such as caraway, black pepper, coriander seed, and garlic. They are each 15–20 cm (6–8 in) in length, made into links of two. Before smoking and drying, they are pressed into a mold, which gives them their characteristic rectangular cross-section of about 2 1/2 cm × 1 cm (1 in × 1/2 in). Typically, a pair of Landjäger weighs about 100 g and contains about 516 kcal. In Austria, Landjäger is sometimes made using horse meat.

== See also ==
- Culinary Heritage of Switzerland
- Animal production and consumption in Switzerland
- Swiss sausages and cured meats
- List of sausages
- Salame ticinese and Salsiz, other dried sausages from Switzerland
