= Salame ticinese =

Swiss sausage

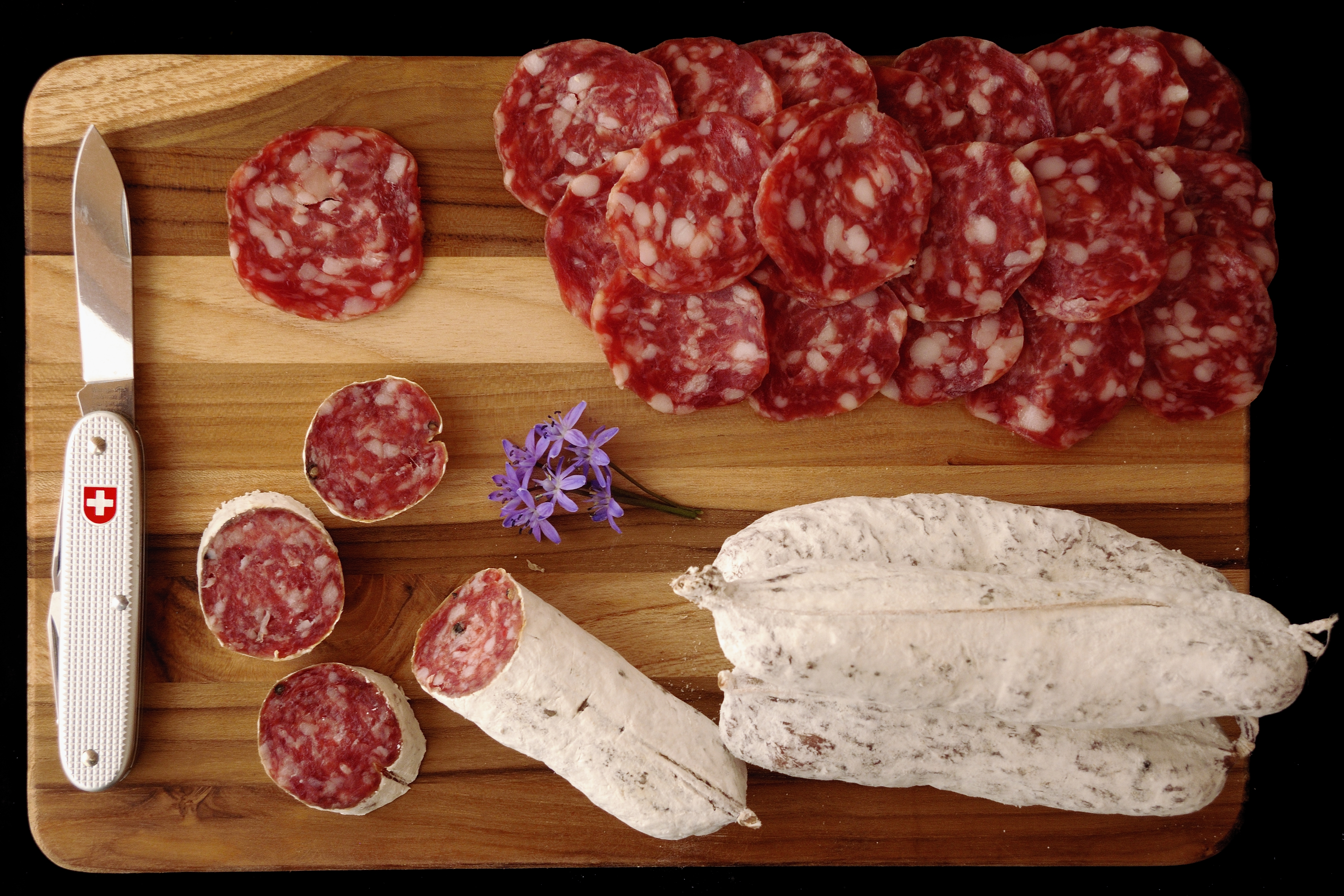
Salame (top) and salametti (bottom)

Salame ticinese (also called salame nostrano) is a variety of salami (air-dried cured pork meat) originating in Ticino, the southernmost region of Switzerland. It is characterized by coarsely ground meat, and is often made into small sausages, called salametti. In Italian, cured meats like salami, prosciutto crudo and coppa are collectively referred to as salumi.

For the production of salami, first choice meats are used. They are selected from the shoulder, nut, thigh, and bacon trimmings. The lard is extracted from the fatty tissue of the back and cut into cubes. The meat is coarsely minced and seasoned with salt, saltpeter, pepper, spices and sometimes garlic and wine. The maturation of the salami can last, depending on the size, from a month up to a year or more. For the salametti instead, it takes only 8–10 days.

Centuries ago, when peasants ate meat only a few times per year, salami was a luxurious product. It was not made for consumption but for sale, and it was a source of income. In the 18th century, wealthy families would hang cured meats from the bedroom ceiling, and among these, salami. In a text written in 1767, Descrizione del baliaggio di Locarno ('Description of the bailiwick of Locarno'), salami is described among other luxury foods: salsiccia affettata e cruda, detta salammi ('sliced and raw sausage, called salami').

Salami was homemade until the 1970s, especially in rural areas. The traditional slaughtering of pigs in Ticino is called mazza. Today, salami is a very popular consumer product in both Ticino and Switzerland, and it is made in large meat factories. Rapelli is the largest manufacturer in the country. In addition to pork salami, horse, donkey, deer, and wild boar salami are also produced. Local specialties include salami matured in the medieval Castles of Bellinzona.

== See also ==
- Swiss sausages and cured meats
- Landjäger and salsiz – other dried sausages from Switzerland
