= Salsiz =

Swiss raw, air-dried sausage from the Grisons

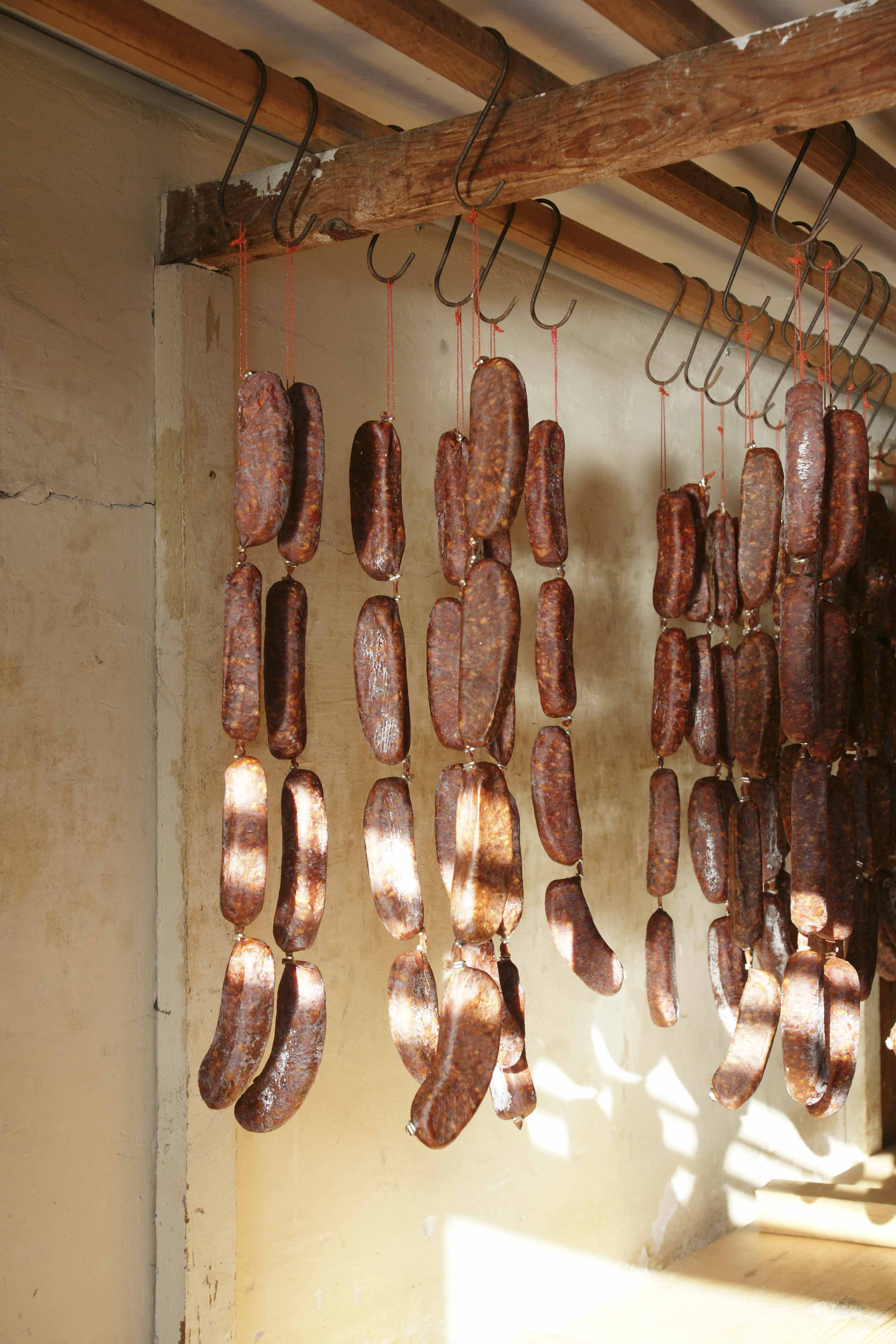
Salsiz sausages being dried

Salsiz is a raw sausage originating in the Grisons, Switzerland. It is an air-dried or smoked sausage, produced in a number of variants. It distinguishes itself from most other sausages by its rectangular profile.

Pork is used as the basic ingredient. Salsiz are also made with game meat such as deer, chamois or wild boar or with meat from other farm animals, such as beef, horse, or sheep/lamb. Salsiz is pressed and usually dried without being smoked.

The salsiz is eaten in one piece or sliced together with bread. It is also an ingredient in dishes, notably Capuns and Plain in Pigna, or used as an accompaniment, notably for Maluns. A regional red wine goes well with salsiz, for example, from the Bündner Herrschaft.

== See also ==
- Swiss sausages and cured meats
- Bündnerfleisch, another dried meat product from the region
- Landjäger and Salame ticinese, other dried sausages from Switzerland
