= Pays-d'Enhaut District =

Coordinates: 46°28′N 7°8′E

Pays-d'Enhaut District (English: Highlands) is a district in the canton of Vaud in Switzerland. The seat of the district is the town of Château-d'Œx.

Three municipalities are located within the district: Château-d'Œx, Rossinière, and Rougemont. A bird appears in the coat of arms and flag of each municipality.

== Mergers and name changes ==
On 1 September 2006 the municipalities of Château-d'Oex, Rossinière and Rougemont came from the District du Pays-d'Enhaut to join the Riviera-Pays-d'Enhaut District.

== Highlights ==
Pays-d'Enhaut is an area of Switzerland located between Lausanne and Interlaken. It borders the Swiss-German Saanenland and the famous resort of Gstaad. The region is T-shaped, comprising two valleys. The main valley runs from the village of La Tine in the direction of Gruyères and Bulle to Rougemont, continuing in the direction of Saanen and Gstaad. The secondary valley runs south from Château-d'Œx to the villages of Etivaz and La Lécherette in the direction of Les Mosses (Col des Mosses) and Aigle, continuing to the canton of Valais.

The district benefits from idyllic summers with several hiking and walking routes. Winter skiing is possible in several locations, especially near Rougemont and Château-d'Œx. The Rougemont ski location is linked by a piste that runs into the Gstaad network of ski runs.

Pays-d'Enhaut is the historical center of the Enhaut dialect group of the Franco-Provençal language. French is spoken in the district, as well.

== Images ==
View from a trail to Point-de-Cray from Château-d'Œx (visible in the foreground). The main mountain peaks are Le Rubli, Gummfluh, and Rocher-du-Midi.

View from path up to Point-de-Cray of Rossinière and lake.

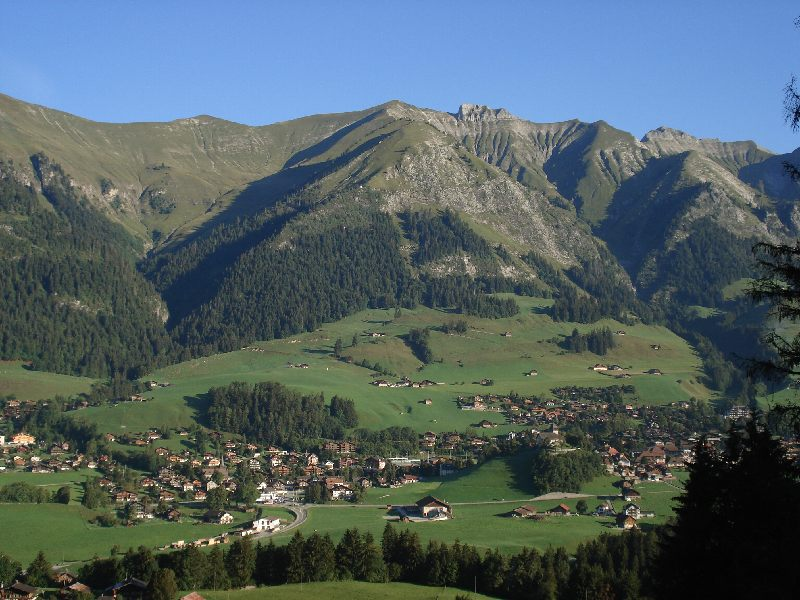
View of Château-d'Œx from a mountain path and across to Vanil mountain.

== See also ==
- Nature parks in Switzerland
