= Gummfluh =

Mountain in Switzerland

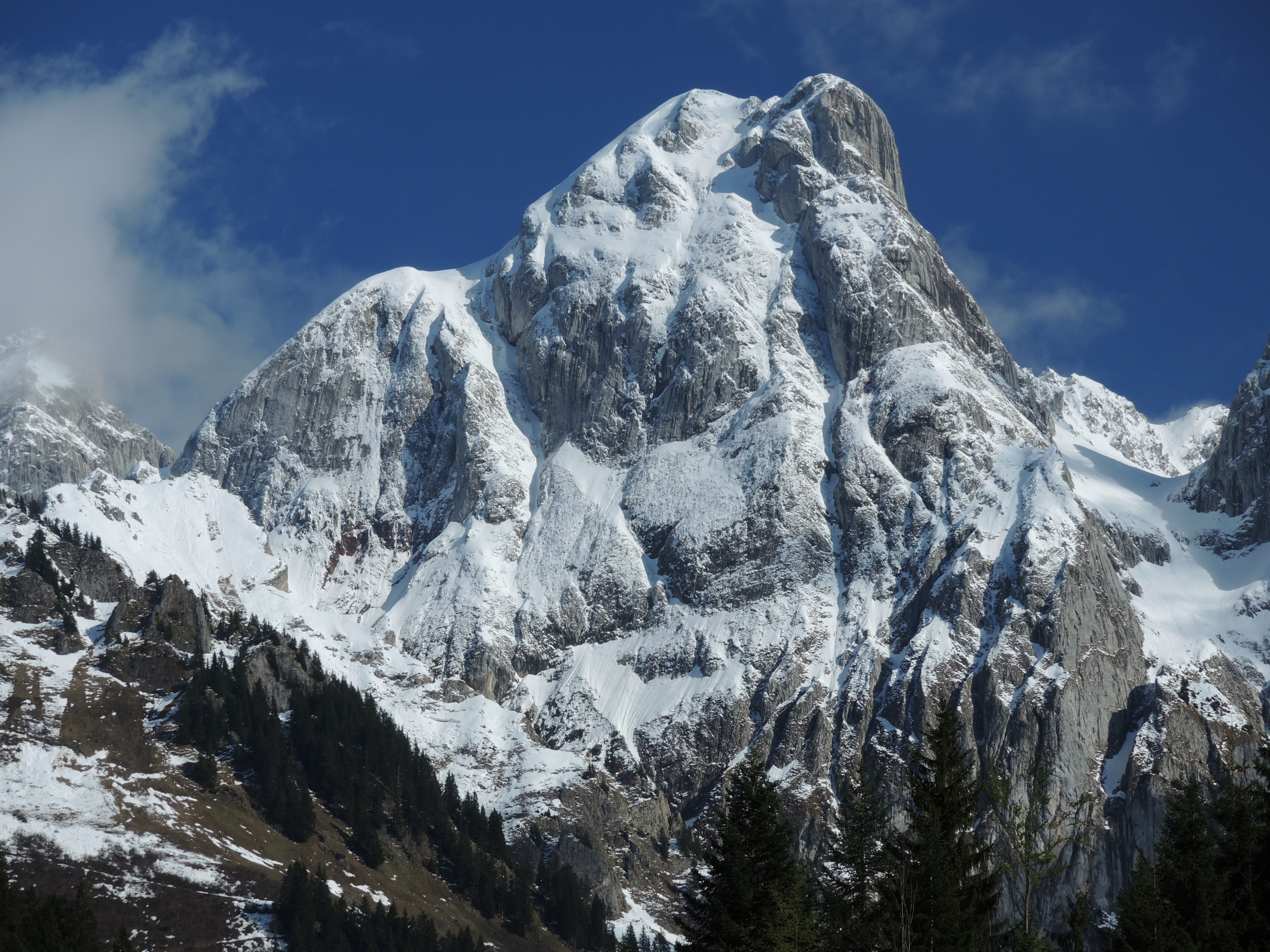
- The Gummfluh from the entry to La Pierreuse nature reserve (north side)

Highest point
- Elevation: 2,458 m (8,064 ft)
- Prominence: 575 m (1,886 ft)
- Parent peak: Le Tarent
- Isolation: 7 km (4.3 mi)
- Coordinates: 46°26′26″N 7°11′42″E

Geography
- Location within Switzerland
- Location: Vaud/Berne, Switzerland
- Parent range: Vaud Alps

The Gummfluh is a mountain in the western Bernese Alps, located on the border between the Swiss cantons of Vaud and Berne. It is the highest peak in the chain of mountains on the south side of the Pays d'Enhaut and it lies approximately halfway between Château d'Oex and Gstaad. The northern slopes form part of the large nature reserve of La Pierreuse.
