= Brési =

Dried beef

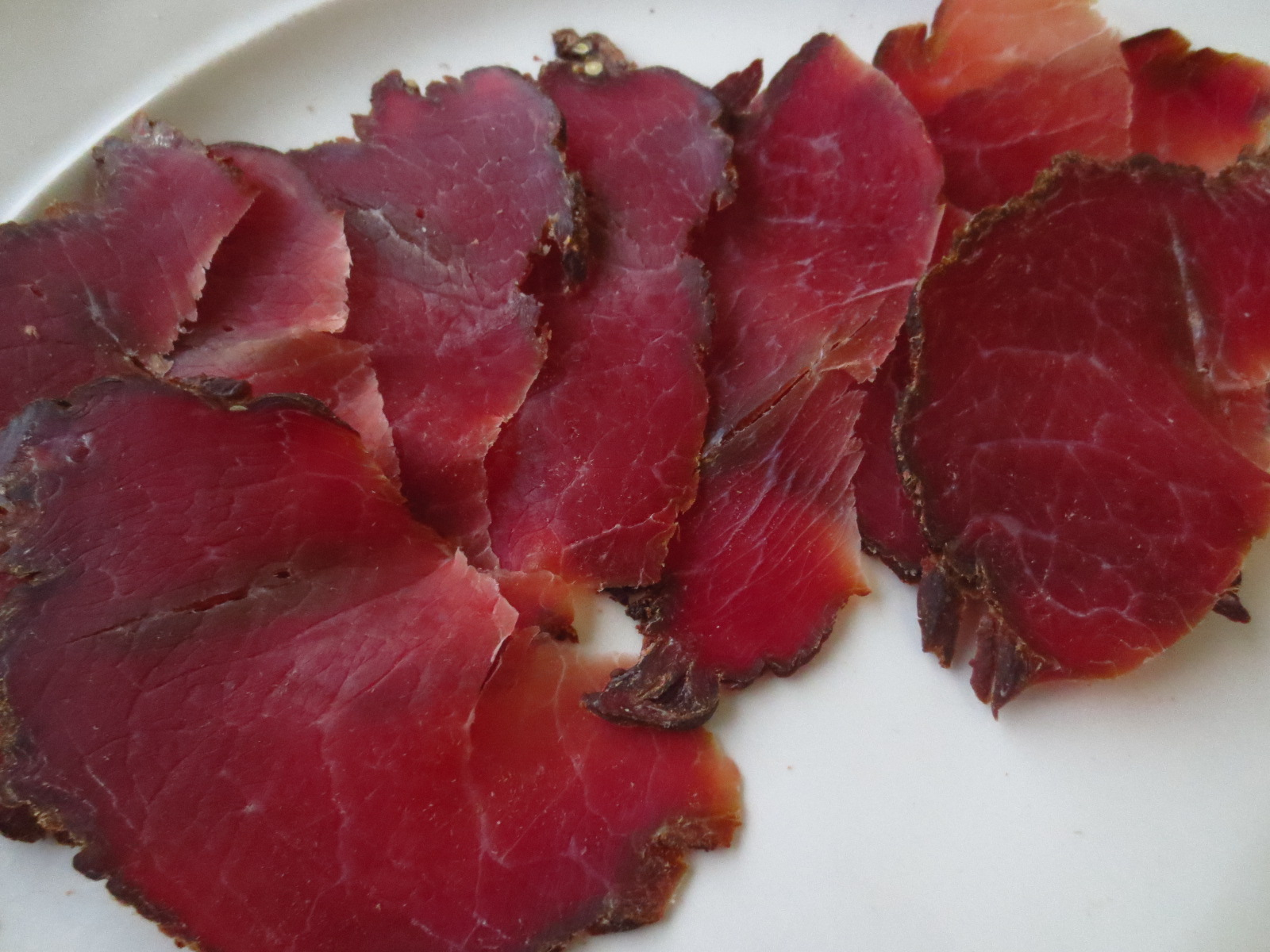
- Brési
- Place of origin: France; Switzerland
- Region or state: Doubs; canton of Jura
- Main ingredients: Dried meat (beef)

Brési or braisi is beef which has been salted, dried and smoked, which is made in the canton of Jura and in Jura bernois in Switzerland and in the department of Doubs in France. It resembles Grisons Buendnerfleisch. Brési is most commonly served thinly sliced at the start of main meals, or else as a side dish with fondues.

Brési first appears in works on gastronomy from about the 15th century. Its name derives from its rich red colour reminiscent of brazilwood, the (at that time highly prized) Asian timber, which at about the same time gave its name also to Brazil.

== See also ==
- Swiss sausages and cured meats
- List of dried foods
- List of smoked foods
