= Bündnerfleisch =

Swiss air-dried meat

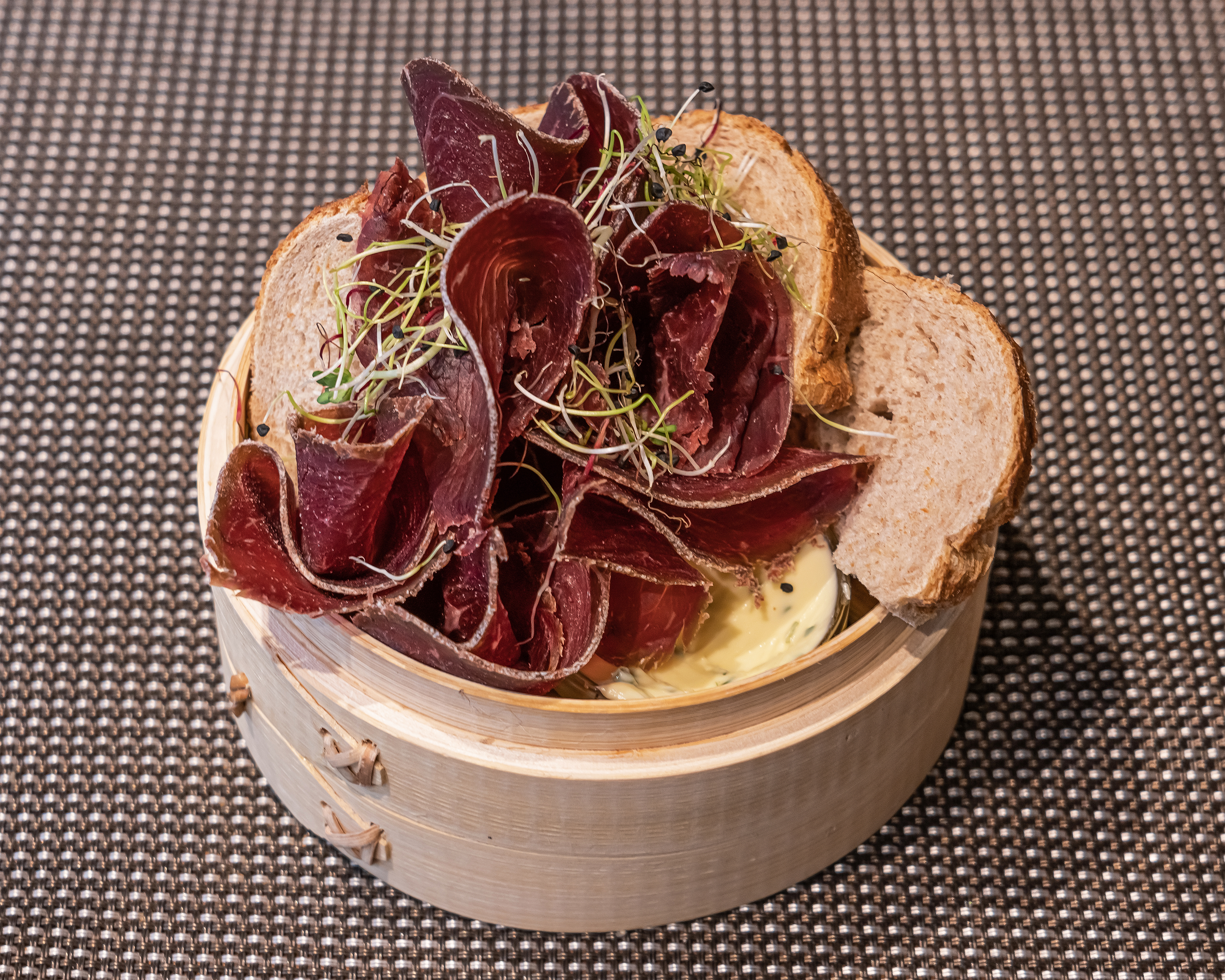
- Alternative names: Bindenfleisch, Grisons Meat, Viande des Grisons
- Place of origin: Switzerland
- Region or state: Graubünden
- Main ingredients: Dried meat (beef)
- Ingredients generally used: onion, herbs, white wine

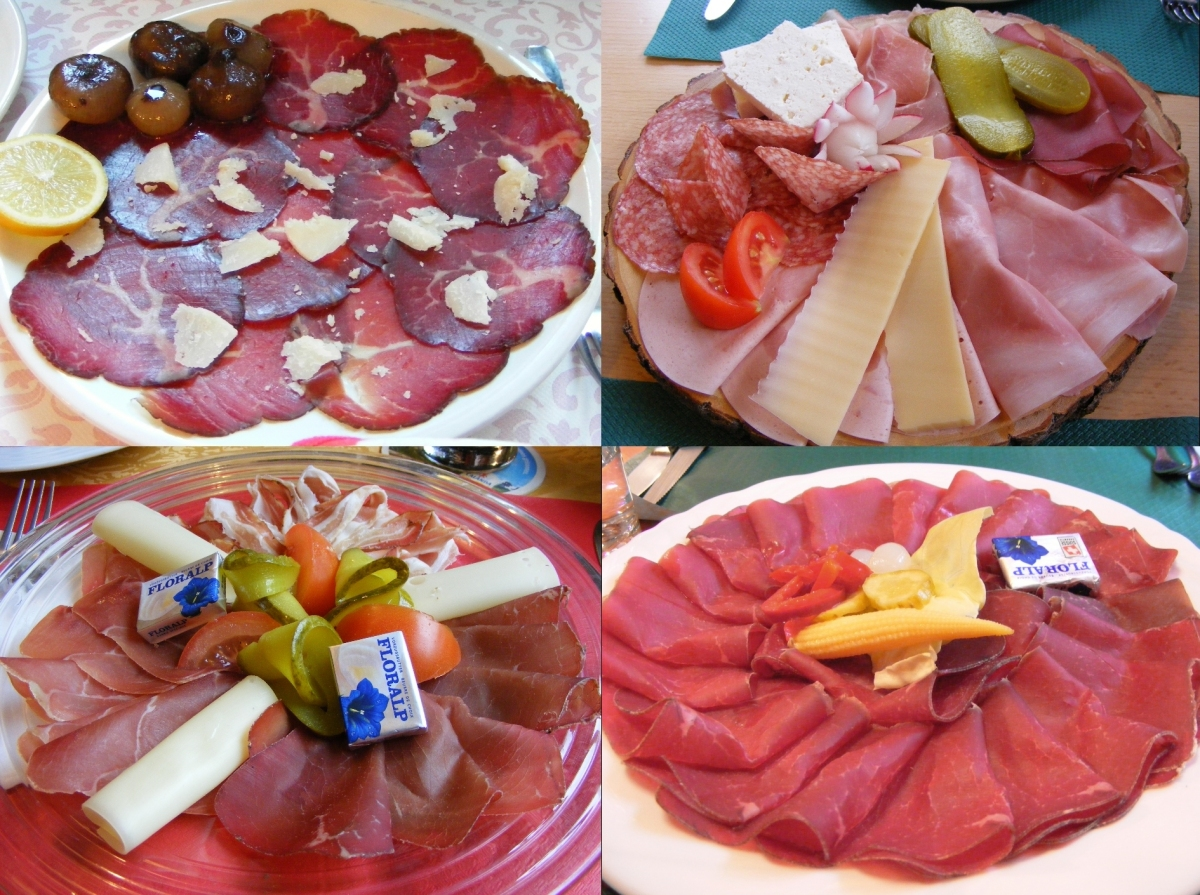

Bündnerfleisch (German pronunciation: [ˈbʏntnɐˌflaɪʃ]), also known as Bindenfleisch, Grisons Meat or Viande des Grisons (French pronunciation: [vjɑ̃d de ɡʁizɔ̃]), is an air-dried meat that is produced in the canton of Graubünden, Switzerland.

== Production ==
The main ingredient is beef, taken from the animal’s upper thigh or shoulder, the fat and the sinews being removed. Before drying, the meat is treated with salt, sugar and assorted spices. The initial curing process, lasting 3–5 weeks, takes place in sealed containers stored at a temperature close to freezing point. The meat is regularly rearranged during this stage, in order to ensure that the salt and seasonings will be evenly distributed and absorbed. During a second drying phase, the meat is then hung in free-flowing air at a temperature of between 9 and 14 °C. It is also periodically pressed in order to separate out residual moisture: from this pressing Bündnerfleisch acquires its characteristic rectangular shape. Traditionally Bündnerfleisch was not a smoked meat.

The extent of water loss during the salting and drying processes, whereby the product loses approximately half of its initial weight, is sufficient to confer excellent keeping qualities and a high nutritional value, without the need for any additional preservatives.

== Consumption ==
Bündnerfleisch is sliced very thinly and served with bread. It is often part of the traditional dish raclette, served to accompany the cheese of the same name alongside ham and vegetables. It can also be cut into strips or little cubes and served in soup.

== Commercialisation ==
Most Bündnerfleisch is consumed inside Switzerland, but some is exported within Europe, to Canada, the United States and Japan.

== Variants ==
Bündnerfleisch appears to be related to the dried meat product from the Besançon region of France known as 'brési'. It is also very similar to bresaola, which is produced in the neighbouring Italian province of Valtellina; unlike Bündnerfleisch, bresaola is not pressed, though.

== See also ==
- Swiss sausages and cured meats
- Salsiz, another dried meat product from the canton
- Brési, another dried meat product from Switzerland
- Bresaola, another Alpine dried meat product
- Dried meat
- List of dried foods
