= Chestnut production in Switzerland =

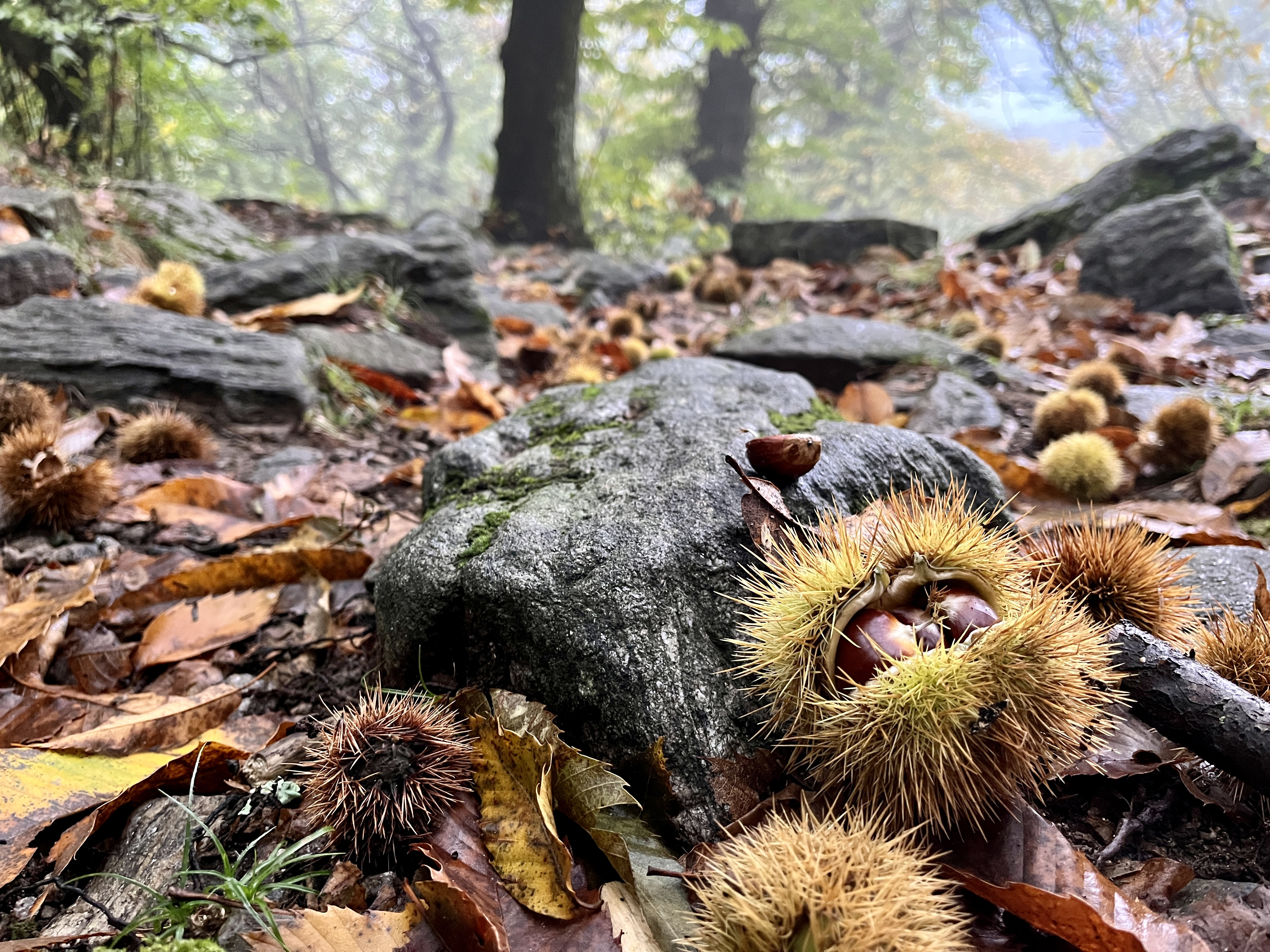
Chestnut grove in Ticino

There is a long history of chestnut cultivation and consumption in Switzerland, particularly in the southern regions. During the 20th century, chestnut has evolved from a staple food to a popular confectionery ingredient.

The chestnut was introduced in Ticino during the Roman era. Chestnut grove and coppice management replaced slash-and-burn agriculture. The climate of southern Switzerland particularly suited the chestnut, to the point it became known as the "bread tree". The chestnut was also introduced in the southern valleys of the Grisons and Valais.

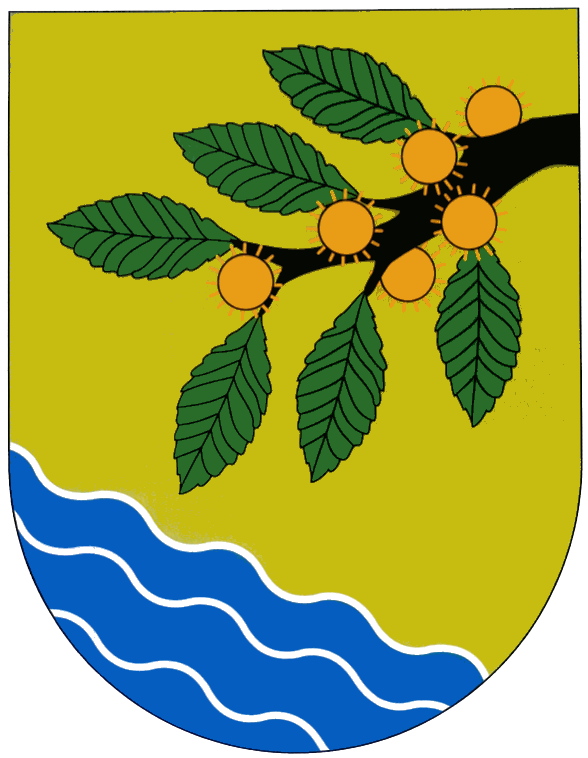
Castasegna, Castaneda and Breggia coats of arms, featuring chestnut trees

Chestnut cultivation declined in the 18th century, when potatoes and maize were introduced in Switzerland. It remained however an important staple food for the poors until the early 20th century; the Siegfried Map introduced a specific symbol for chestnut groves in 1914. The maintenance of chestnut groves ceased during the 20th century due to diseases and declined after the massive exploitation of wood for tannin factories.

Since the 1990s, chestnut groves and chestnuts have been of interest to tourists and local communities started their revalorization. Today, 98% of Swiss chestnut trees are found on the south side of the Alps (Ticino and the Grisons), for instance in the Malcantone and Val Bregaglia. Chestnut groves are also found in Valais, particularly in Fully and Saint-Gingolph, and various other locations around Lake Lucerne and the Walensee.

The consumption of chestnuts today is essentially festive. Ticino restaurants and pastry chefs all over Switzerland also make vermicelli, an autumnal dessert consisting of a sweet chestnut purée and whipped cream.

== See also ==
- Olive production in Switzerland
- Agriculture in Switzerland
