= Olive production in Switzerland =

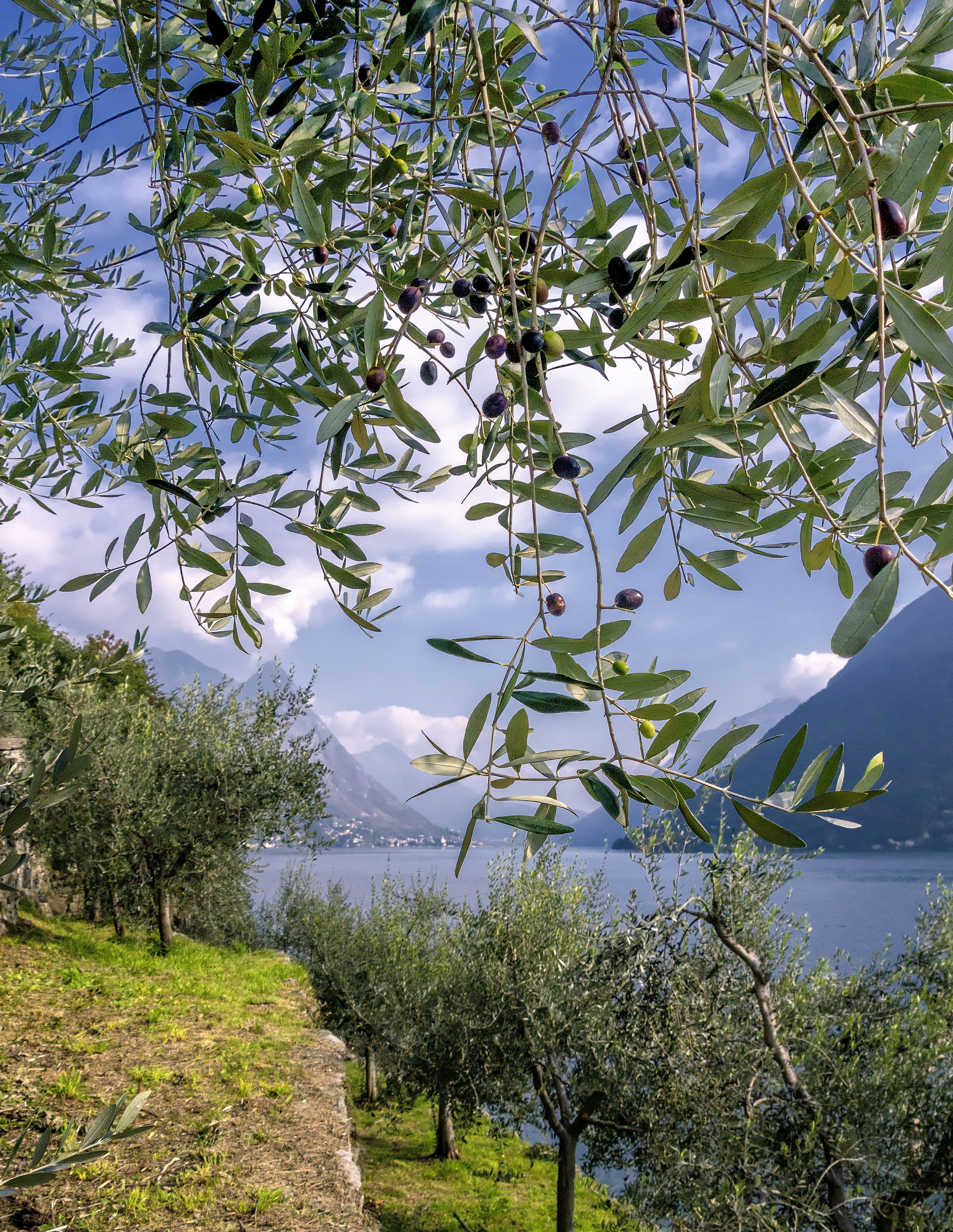
Olive grove in Gandria

There is a long history of olive cultivation and olive oil production in southern Switzerland. Ticino is the main production region, with the Grisons being the only other production area in the country. However, olive production is economically marginal, as Switzerland lies at the northern limit of the cultivation area.

== History ==
It is not known when the olive tree was introduced in Switzerland. Retired legionaries from Julius Caesar's campaign in Gaul are said to have planted olive trees on the shores of Lake Como, which lies a few kilometres east of the current Swiss border. It is possible that they moved further towards Lake Lugano. It is also possible that the olive tree was domesticated in Ticino starting from indigenous wild-olive trees.

Olive oil production on Swiss territory is attested by the monk Ekkehard IV from St. Gallen around the year 1000. He notably wrote: "Hunc olee fructum faciat lux, pax benedictum" ("This fruit of the olive tree gives light and blesses peace"). This sentence testifies to the main use of olive oil, as fuel for oil lamps. The olive tree was important enough to be mentioned in numerous documents, mostly sales registers, which confirm its presence over the centuries. In the cantonal archive of Ticino there is among other things a document from 1488 according to which two brothers from Bissone sold a property with "Holivetum" at Rovio. Another document from 1512 records the farm "of arable land and vineyard with olive trees located in the territory of Bissone". Historical olive production is also suggested by local toponomy, with denominations such as Monte Oliveto ("mount of olives") found in various locations.

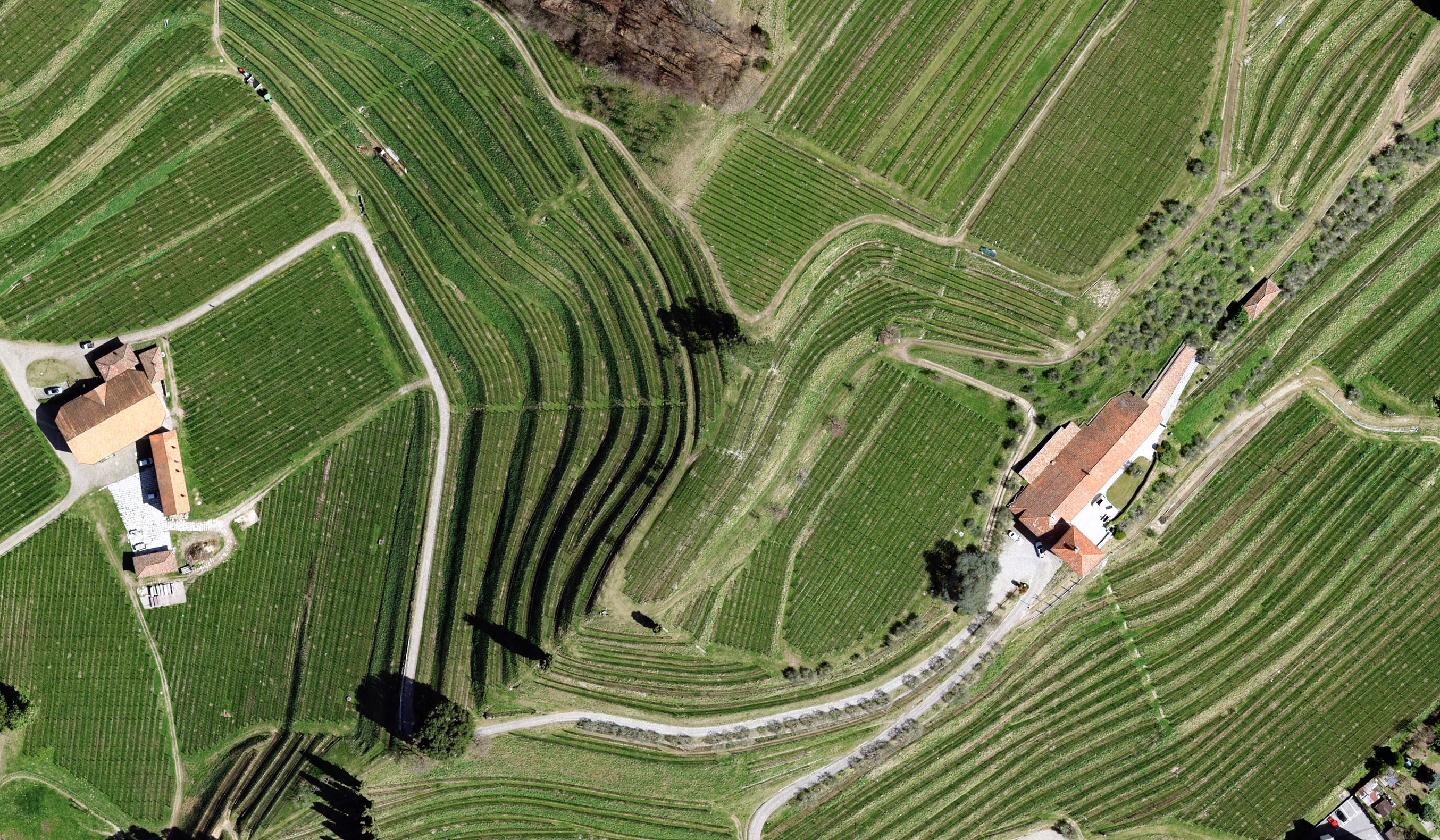
Vineyards and olives at the Colle degli Ulivi

In 1494, 1600 and 1709, frost destroyed almost all the olive groves, perhaps a consequence of the Little Ice Age, which affected Switzerland and Europe at that time. Subsequently, the olive tree lost its importance and was partly replaced by the mulberry tree in the Lugano and Mendrisiotto regions. The breeding of silkworms became a more important source of income in Ticino. Nevertheless, olive cultivation, along with mulberry, lemon and orange, is reported and described by travellers from northern Switzerland in the late 18th and early 19th century. It can therefore be deduced that the southern slopes of Monte Brè, San Salvatore, Arbostora and various other locations, were still populated by vast olive groves at that time. In the 20th century, olive cultivation nearly disappeared. Olive oil was only produced in Gandria, in minute quantities.

Towards the end of the 20th century, local cuisine and products began to attract growing interest throughout Switzerland. At the end of the 1980s, olive cultivation was revived at the Colle degli Ulivi in Coldrerio. Other olive groves were created in Sonvico and Sementina. In Gandria, the olive footpath was established.

In 2016, a farm in Brusio (Grisons) began to cultivate olive trees on restored terraces that probably date back to the 16th century. In 2019, a small olive farm was established in Satigny (Geneva), probably the first in the country on the north side of the Alps. In 2024, a winemaker established another farm in Ayent (Valais).

== Production and consumption ==
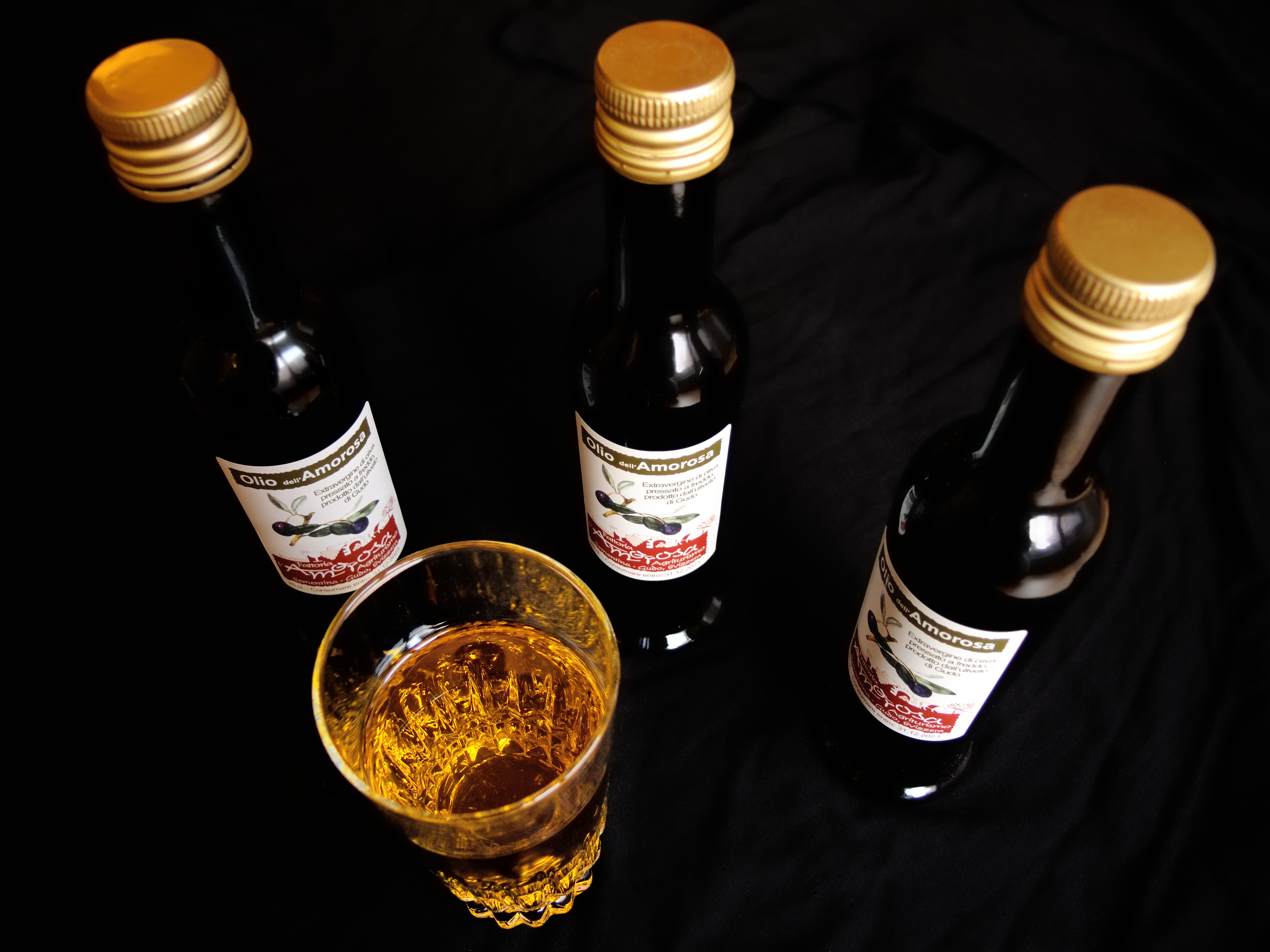
Extra virgin olive oil from Ticino

Southern Switzerland constitutes the northern limit (or historical limit in the context of global warming) of the cultivation zone where the climatic conditions are favourable to the growth of the olive, a plant sensitive to cold. The Flora Helvetica, the reference work for identifying flowering plants in Switzerland, describes the olive habitat: "Rocky slopes, bushes, cultivated and rarely wild in southern Ticino". The highest olive grove is found above Faido, at 907 metres above sea level. The most common cultivars are Leccino, Frantoio and Pendolino. In Sonvico, Melide, Lopagno and Verdabbio (Grisons), olive orchards with cultivars from Ticino have been established by ProSpecieRara.

Olive oil production in Switzerland is very small. In 2020, 18,271 kilograms of olives were processed in the mills of Losone and Sonvico and 1,990 litres of olive oil were produced. This constitutes the bulk of the production in the country. Nonetheless, Ticino olive oil was inscribed in the Culinary Heritage of Switzerland in 2021.

Olive oil is popular in Switzerland and it is essentially imported from more southerly countries. Olive oil is used in a few traditional dishes of southern Switzerland, notably Risotto alla ticinese. It is also used as a condiment and accompanies regional products, such as fresh cheeses.

== See also ==
- Swiss wine
- Chestnut production in Switzerland
- Agriculture in Switzerland
