= Agriculture in Switzerland =

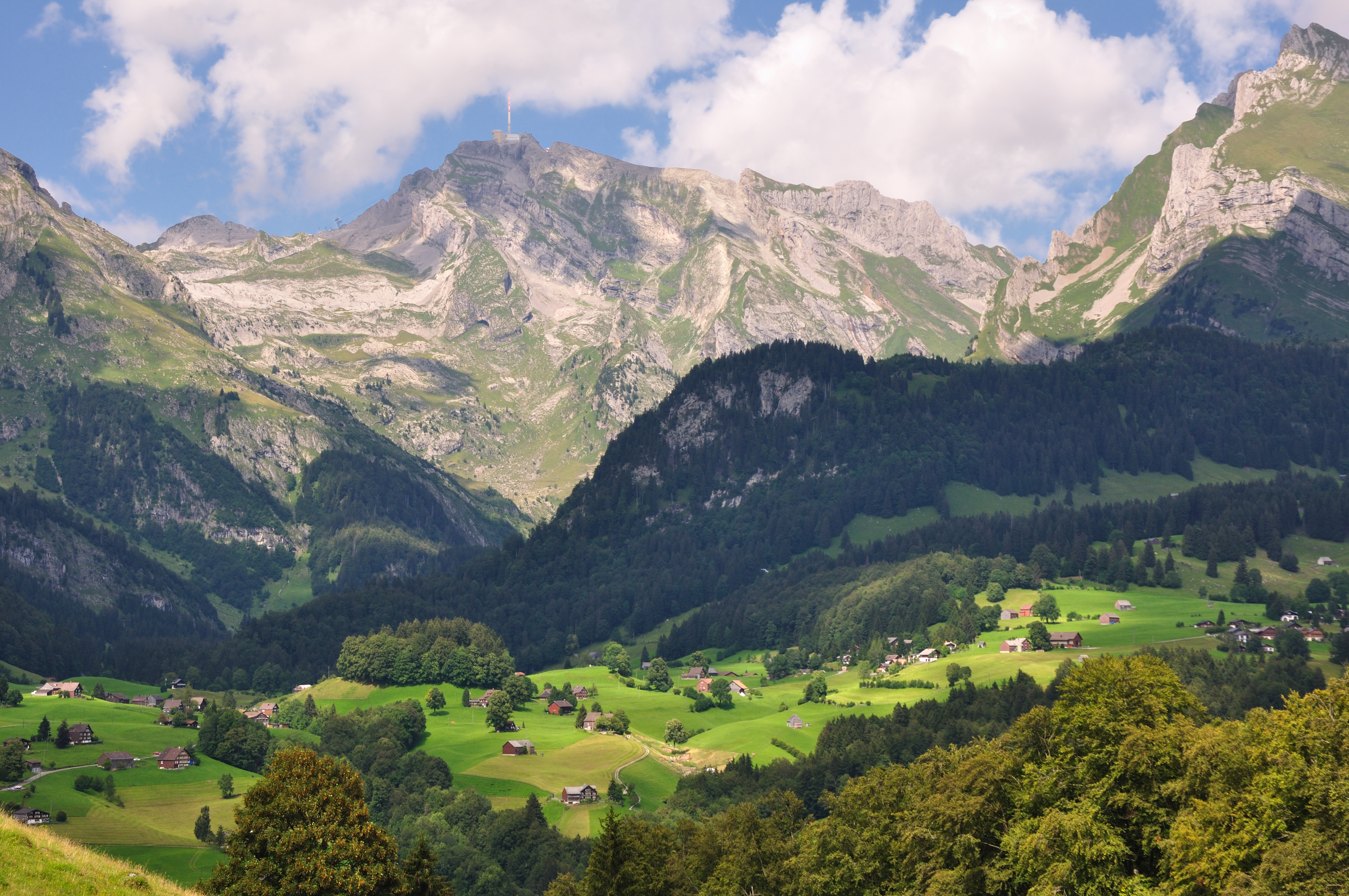
Mountain agriculture in the Toggenburg

Agriculture in Switzerland, one of the economic sectors of the country, has developed since the 6th millennium BC and was the principal activity and first source of income until the 19th century. Framework of rural society, agriculture has as main factors the natural conditions (climate), the demographic evolution and agrarian structures (institutional and legal norms). In Switzerland, it has become much diversified, despite the small size of the territory, owing to the geographical diversity of the country.

The impacts of agriculture in Switzerland are not only economic. The agricultural sector uses around half of the surface area of the country and contributes in the shaping the Swiss landscape. Swiss farmers also produce more than half of the food consumed in Switzerland, thereby helping to safeguard national food security and culinary traditions.

== History ==
=== Prehistory ===
In Switzerland, the processes of establishment of the Neolithic economy, of which agriculture is only one of the components, although essential, seem to begin around 5500 BC. The disparities in the archaeological documentation do not allow a model that traces the transition of societies from the last hunters (stage of predation) to those of the first Neolithic farmers (stage of agro-pastoral production); only the coexistence of the two groups seems assured within a primary deciduous forest, still little modified by anthropic action. In the regions of Basel and Zürich, clearing, food crops of emmer, einkorn and peas, textile crops of flax, poppy are attested from the early Neolithic; in Valais and Ticino, an advanced Neolithic economy seems to have been put in place rapidly. The practices of agriculture in the narrow sense of the term (open land) and animal husbandry, the manufacture of polished stone tools, ceramics and millstones are directly associated in the Early Neolithic sites.

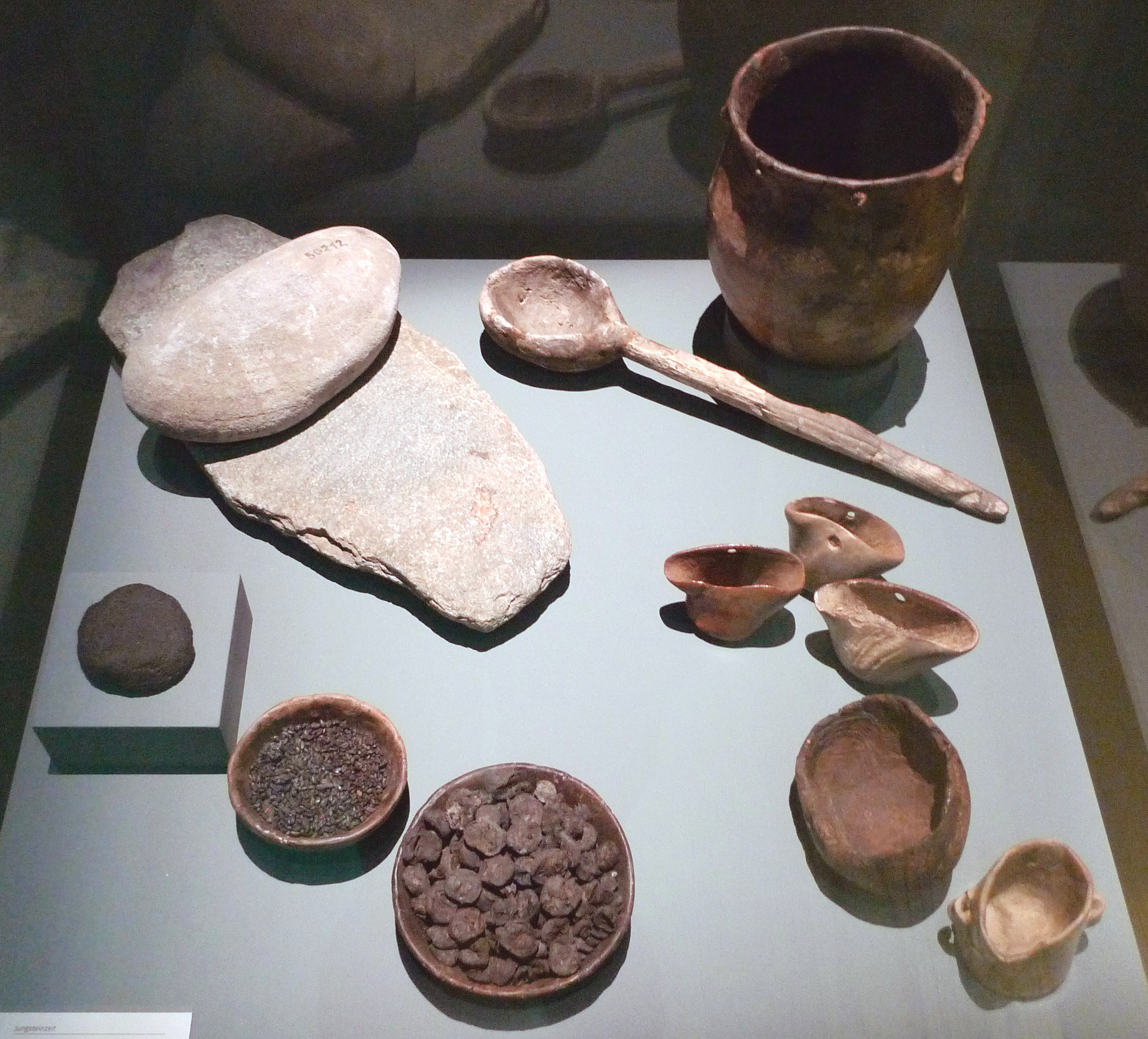
Neolithic utensils and foodstuffs (bread, grains and apples) from archaeological sites in Switzerland

From the Middle Neolithic (4900 to 3200 BC approximately), with the installation of coastal settlements, the occupation and exploitation of the land intensified as the population grew. The fields are probably cultivated for a few years in a row with a succession of different plants (wheat is predominant on the Plateau) cultivated alternately with a long fallow period. From the fallow land, a secondary forest of hazelnut or birch trees quickly re-establishes itself; it easily provides man with lumber or firewood, as well as the products of the gathering (hazelnuts and apples). This agrarian system, well adapted to the still predominant forest domain (beech forest - fir forest), allows good soil regeneration. The areas cleared as and when required, probably by fire, are still modest. In the recent and final Neolithic (3200 to 2200 approximately), their proportion increases. The fallow period is reduced and larger areas are exploited around the villages. The intensification of agricultural practices is contemporaneous with the population growth admitted for this period.

The Bronze Age (2200 to 750-700 BC approximately) saw the completion of the shaping of the landscape by the farmer. In the Late Bronze Age, on the Plateau, towards Lake Constance for example, it is already similar to that of the Middle Ages, where cultivated fields and meadows rub shoulders with plots of managed forest. In the Jura, the first traces of clearing date back to the Middle and Late Bronze Age. Barley becomes the predominant cereal, followed by spelt. Millets make their appearance, the share of legumes (beans, lentils, peas) becomes more important. Flax and poppy are still cultivated, while camelina are introduced. The very large number of meadow and pasture plants speaks in favor of the increase of these biotopes at least from the Late Bronze Age. In the Alpine valleys, the human impact near the edge of the forest is accentuated in the Bronze Age, but nothing is known about the practices of cattle summering before the Middle Ages. For the whole of the Bronze Age, the farming system of the land was of the agro-pastoral type with crop rotation and intercalation of short and probably grazed fallows. The soil is worked using plows pulled by oxen as shown in the rock carvings of Val Camonica (Italian Alps). Summer crops (millet and legumes) and winter crops (spelt) are now well documented. The seconds have an early ripening and higher yield.

The transition from the Bronze Age to the Iron Age is around 800-750 BC approximately and coincides with a phase of climatic deterioration spread over a hundred years (civilization of Hallstatt, civilization of La Tène). During the Iron Age (until around 50 BC), the intensity of clearing increased. The deployment of oak and beech is probably the reflection of their exploitation for the harvest of acorns and beechnuts. Hornbeam, a newcomer, provides the wood needed for metallurgy. The spectrum of plants cultivated in the Iron Age is not very different from that of the Bronze Age, except for the appearance of oats. The greatest innovations are to be found at the level of agricultural techniques: iron craftsmanship allows a greater diversification of tools. The plows are improving. Crop rotation with intercalations of short fallows is still attested. The use of manure also seems proven. Grassland management is changing from extensive management of wooded pastures to the mowing of meadows, which are also used as pastures. The hay harvest can be linked to the appearance of stabling in stable houses. It is known that the Helvetii exported not only cheese and cattle, but also cereals, which shows that their agriculture was no longer purely subsistence.

=== Roman era ===
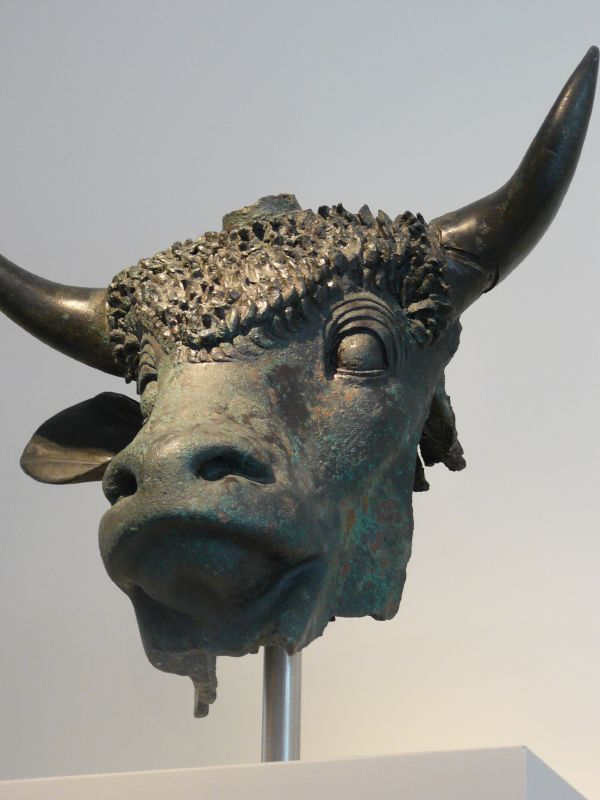
Head of a sacred bull from Octodurus

In Roman times (50 BC to 400 AD), the main innovations were the simultaneous appearance of walnut and chestnut plantations, the introduction of crops of hemp and rye (still rare) and probably vines (viticulture). Aside from the extension of cultivated fields, meadows and wooded pastures, there is no real break in the development of vegetation between the Iron Age and Roman times, which probably reflects a permanent agro-pastoral practices. On the Plateau, the dominant cereal is spelt. The crops of textile and oilseed plants are diversified: flax, hemp, poppy and camelina. Vegetables, spices, medicinal plants and fruit trees, including the newly arrived peach tree, are maintained in gardens, fields or orchards close to the habitat (villa). A major change in the evolution of the plant cover is not detected before the year 1000, which pleads in favor of continuity between the Roman period and the High Middle Ages.

=== Middle Ages ===
For the High Middle Ages, many questions still remain open, given the almost complete silence of written sources related to landed seignory and the scarcity of archaeological research devoted to rural areas. Several peasant settlements are attested on the site of ancient Roman villas (Munzach, Dietikon, Vicques). As the legal sources use a detailed vocabulary for cattle and pigs, the majority of historians admit that breeding had a greater weight than it will have in the following centuries, but there was no specialization yet, as the breeders also practiced plowing around their farms, extensively and individually. The domanial regime was found above all in ecclesiastical seignories (Abbey of St. Gallen), as some period documents suggest.

From the 9th to the 12th century, the growth of the population led to the growth of cultivated areas. How did animal husbandry evolve? This question, made difficult by the extreme scarcity of sources, is controversial. Clearing culminated in the 12th-13th centuries. To feed a growing population, cereal growing was intensified on the Plateau, on the one hand by converting meadows into fields and by reducing the herd (especially small cattle, goats and sheep), on the other hand by improving yields by the transition to compulsory municipal rotation (village) and by technical progress such as the introduction of the plough. This development did not affect the high altitude areas, which were not very favorable to cereals; In the Alps and especially in the Pre-Alps, there was a specialization in animal husbandry from the 14th century onwards, under the influence (at least in central Switzerland) of ruling families who increasingly oriented themselves towards the urban markets of Northern Italy (cattle trade). Specialization made the peasants of the late Middle Ages dependent on the agricultural market not only for the sale of their products, but also for their supply. It favored regionalization on a large or small scale, for example in eastern Switzerland: vineyards in the Rhine valley, livestock in Appenzell, cereals on the Plateau. This leads to a division of labor between various agrarian zones.

The cities had a great influence on the evolution of agriculture from the 13th century at least. Disengaging from the pure subsistence economy, peasants belonging to the elite, began to sell their surpluses on the urban markets. As for the bourgeois, they invested in the lands close to their city to produce easy-to-sell goods there: wine, meat, vegetables, fruit, flax, hemp and tinctorial plants. Agriculture also suffered the shock of the processes described under the name of the crisis of the late Middle Ages: for example, ownership structures modified by demographic evolution, vagaries of agricultural prices, rationalization and reorientation of social relations and dependencies.

The end of the Middle Ages and the beginning of the Modern era is characterized by a significant climate cooling, the Little Ice Age. Switzerland and a large part of Europe experienced at that time a greater frequency of cold and dry winters and springs with a tendency to wind, which is confirmed by historical research on the effects of climate: cereal crops, viticulture and dairy production all suffered from the spring cold (especially in April), generally followed by whole weeks of precipitation during the summer. In the phases of progression of the glaciers, more particularly between 1570 and 1630, the bad harvests due to the climate caused frequent high prices.

=== Modern era ===
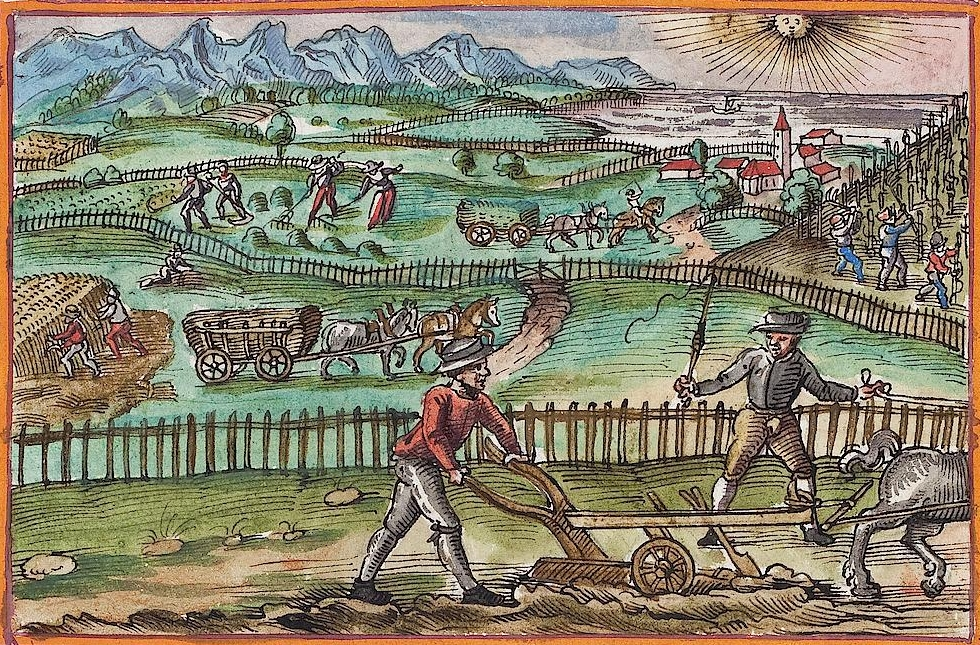
A 16th century depiction of agriculture on the Plateau

Despite the proto-industrialization that began in the late 16th century, the agricultural sector remained by far the most important branch of the Swiss economy throughout the early modern period. Although there is a lack of statistical data of sufficient quality, this seems to apply to all relevant variables: the capital stock, investments, quantity and value of production and finally also the number of people employed in agriculture. The vast majority of the population lived in and from agriculture, which until the 19th century was largely based on the regionally available resources.

The agricultural sector therefore made a significant contribution to financing the public budget. On the wheat lands of the Plateau, it was subject to the constraints of crop rotation, feudal dues and the authority of the towns of which the peasants were the subjects. Communal regulations, very different from one area to another, determined the daily life of producers. In particular, they contained provisions on collective rights of use and on access to commons, they set local rules in terms of land transfers, access to the bourgeoisie, public assistance and the procedure to be followed in the event of social conflict. But all of this was taking place in a legally, politically and socially unequal society.

With the exception of heavily exporting livestock areas, Swiss peasants worked mainly for their own consumption, a little for regional markets and rarely beyond. Moreover, only a wealthy minority produced surpluses for the market. It was especially the large farms who profited from periods of boom, for example by exporting to southern Germany during the Thirty Years' War. The majority of the rural population derived only ancillary income from the regional agricultural market and depended for their survival on the wealthy minority. If the upper strata aimed to create surpluses to be delivered to the market, in the middle and lower strata, men and women had to supplement the exploitation of their land with all kinds of salaried activities in petty commerce, crafts, industry or agriculture.

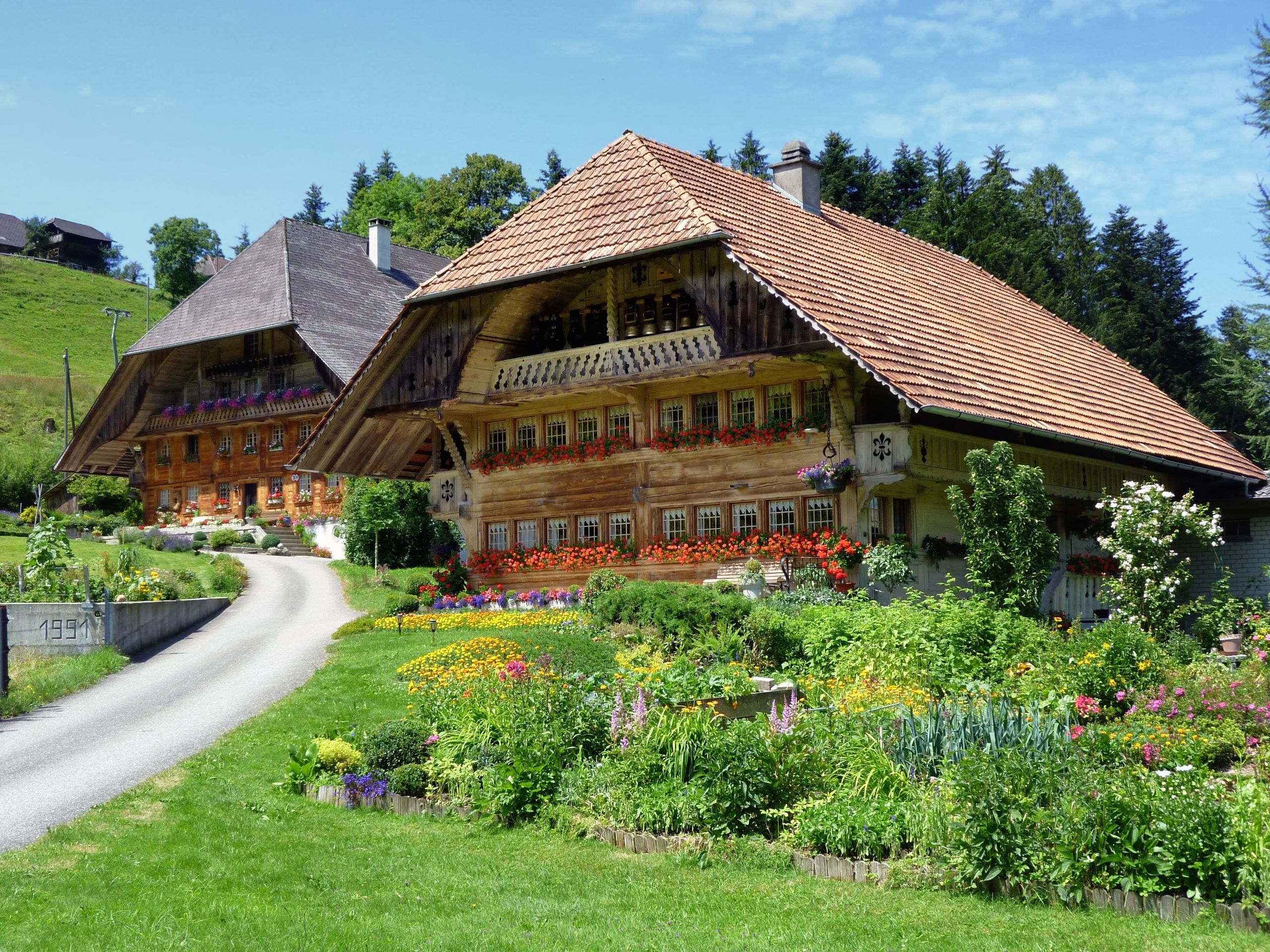
Late 18th century farmhouses in the Emmental

Population growth, higher than the European average (doubling in 1700 and almost tripling in 1800 from 1500), was a challenge for agriculture. In early modern times, many new lands were opened up and more intensive methods were adopted. At the end of the 16th century already, on the southern edge of the Plateau, the rotation was supplemented or even replaced by an intensive grassland/cereal crop rotation, which caused new conflicts related to usage rights. In many areas of open land the production of grain increased in proportion to the population, as is shown, for example, by the tripling of the yield of tithes at Lucerne between 1500 and 1700. But where animal husbandry and protoindustry dominated, grain had to be imported from southern Germany or northern Italy. The population boom did not go without leading to fragmentation of property, multiplication of peasants lacking land, repeated famines, misery, increased cost of land and agricultural debt. One result was the Swiss peasant war of 1653.

While large farms progressed in Europe, Swiss agriculture remained the work of family businesses. In the 18th century, the extension of work at home procured accessory earnings and new means of existence for poor families, who launched themselves with all their might into industry while cultivating a cramped estate.

The second half of the 18th century marks the beginning of profound changes in the open land areas (while the livestock areas had undergone their great transformation in the Middle Ages): new enclosures, introduction of the potato, sharing of the commons, sowing of fallow land and permanent stabling came to modify, more or less strongly according to the regions, the agrarian structures. The modernization of agriculture which took place between 1750 and 1850 constituted an agricultural revolution, even if it took place in fits and starts. The Old World slowly gave way to the new, and old and new methods of exploitation began to coexist. Around 1800, the irreversible movement had only just begun.

=== 19th and 20th century ===
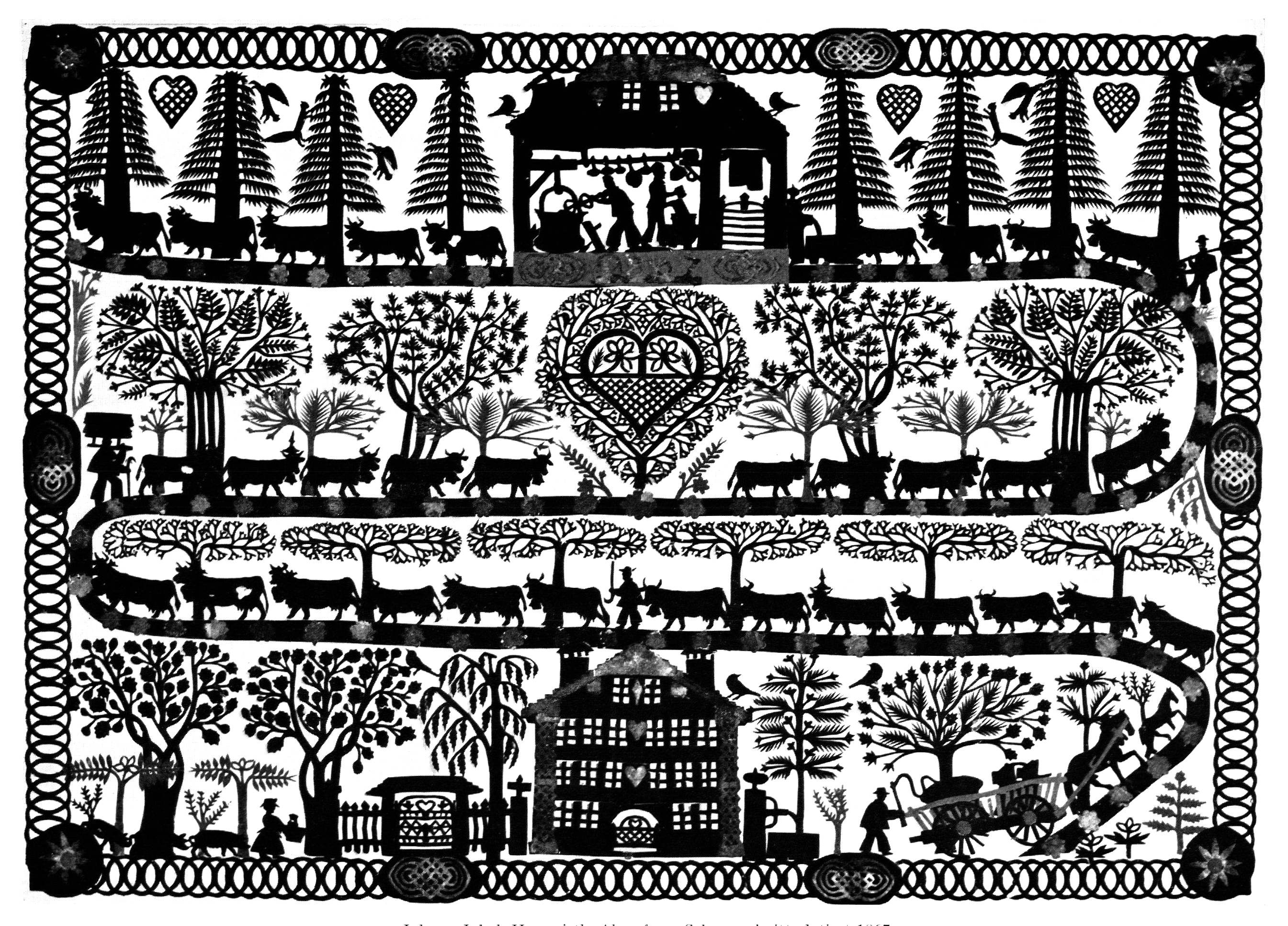
Cheese-making traditions on cut paper (1867)

The 19th century brought great changes to Swiss agriculture. The first agricultural revolution was completed around 1850, even if compulsory rotation did not completely disappear until the second half of the 19th century. Productivity increased thanks to improvements in continuous rotation and fertilizers, thanks to the elimination of fallowing and thanks to the beginning of mechanization. Livestock and the dairy industry spread to the Alpine foothills, cheese dairies appeared on the plains, first in French-speaking Switzerland. In the industrial society, agriculture increasingly became a distinct sector, though well integrated into the national economy through the market and through upstream and downstream activities.

Faced with industrial growth, the agricultural sector shrinks, despite or because of its increased productivity: it employed around 500 000 people around 1860-1880, 250 000 around 1960, 125 000 around 1980, i.e. 60% of the active population in 1800 and 50% in 1850 (estimates), 31% in 1900, 19.5% in 1950 and about 4% in 2000, including, from 1950, part-time workers. But the huge increase in yields, especially since the 1950s, has allowed production to keep pace with population growth; the country's share of self-sufficiency has even increased. The annual added value of the primary sector amounted to 0.5 billion francs around 1880 (30% of the national total) and more than 10 billion around 1990 (about 3%). However, these figures do not really reflect the weight of agriculture, because they do not include the industrial activities located upstream and downstream, which became increasingly important in the 20th century.

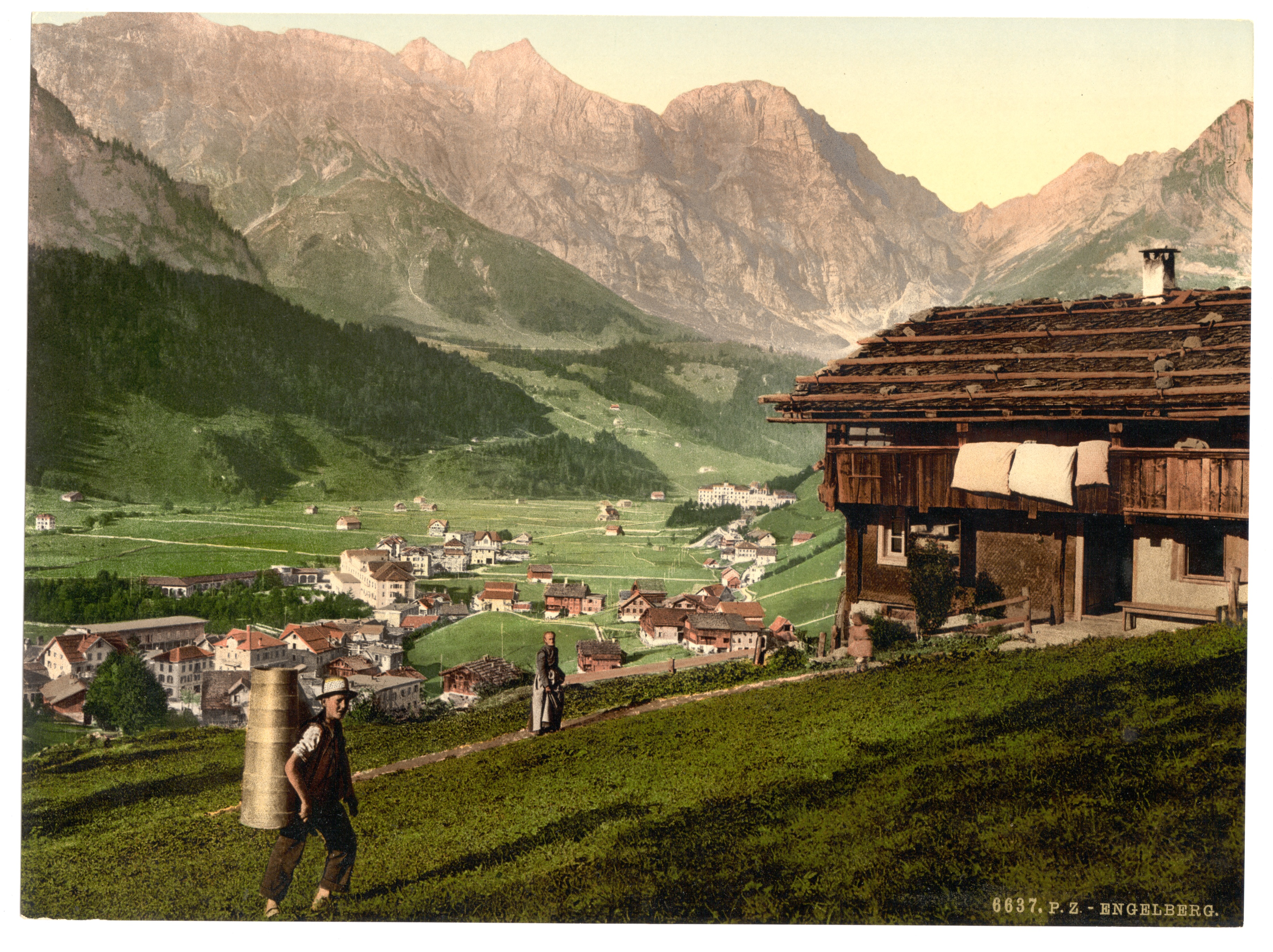
Peasants in Engelberg (1900)

Advances in transportation brought about a global agricultural market, which placed the grain farmers of the Plateau in front of competition from cheaper foreign wheat, which in the 1860s brought about a second revolution: milk replaced cereals as a staple product. Natural conditions were favorable and sales assured, given growing demand everywhere, with foreign countries absorbing more than a quarter of production since the 1880s. New cheese dairies and processing plants (condensed milk, chocolate) were opened. Plowed fields decreased from 500 000 ha in the middle of the 19th century, i.e. approximately half of the useful agricultural area, to 200 000 ha before the First World War. Naturally, most peasants still grew cereals, but almost only for their own use or as fodder. The vine also declined, especially in eastern Switzerland. On the other hand, fruits and vegetables found takers in town and in the cannery, which flourished after 1900. Thus was set up an agriculture strongly integrated into local and world markets, through its purchases (fertilizers, agricultural machinery), as well as through its sales to industries of transformation. The dairy industry began to dominate; animal husbandry and agriculture were essentially their suppliers, slaughter cattle and pigs its by-products. However, wine economy was maintained in French-speaking Switzerland and cereal growing was also maintained in some regions of northern Switzerland.

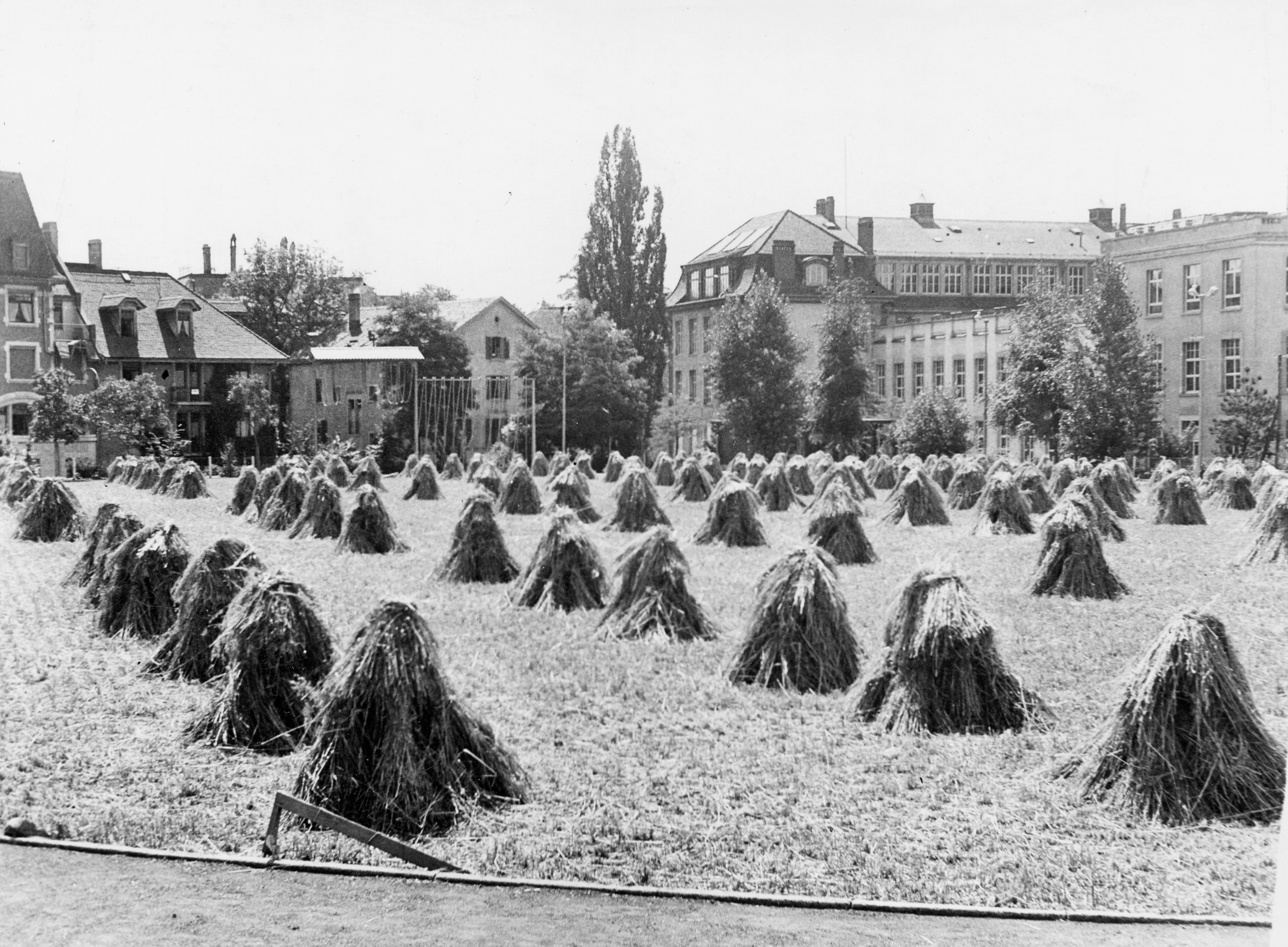
A sports ground used for agriculture during WWII

After the First World War, the supply difficulties encountered during the conflict and the cost of dairy monoculture, as soon as cheese exports began to decline, led the authorities to favor cereals at the expense of milk, but without big success. Things changed during the Second World War, with the Wahlen Plan, which increased the plowed areas to nearly 350 000 ha. After the war, this figure fell rapidly to 250 000 ha; the milk quota introduced in 1977 brought it back up to 300 000 ha in the 1980s. Henceforth, 75% of income came from animal production, with meat gradually taking precedence over milk. Cattle (993 000 head in 1866, 1 587 000 in 1926) and pig herds (304 000 head in 1866, 876 000 in 1926) temporarily exceeded the two million head mark.

The post-war period is characterized by the rapid change of structures, an enormous growth in yields and an increase in productivity superior to that of industry. This is a third agricultural revolution, based on the success of livestock farming, motorization (in 1992 the number of tractors equaled that of full-time farmers) and the ever greater use of chemical fertilizers and phytosanitary products. In the 1990s, deregulation and better respect for the environment brought new challenges for Swiss agriculture.

== Production ==
The climate of Switzerland, which ranges from subtropical to arctic, allows a wide diversity of agricultural products. Of the actual productive soil about two-thirds are devoted to arable or pasturage purposes. However, Swiss agriculture is largely dominated by meadows and pastures, which make up three-quarters of farmland, with cereals and vegetables being confined to the lowlands.

On the Plateau, agriculture is focused on grain (barley, oats, rye and wheat), potato, maize, sugar beet and, increasingly, rapeseed cultivation. The most important fruit-growing areas are in Western and Eastern Switzerland. Thanks to the Correction of the Rhône, Valais became a major producer of fruits, notably apricots. Thurgau is also a major producer of fruits, notably apples. In the cantons of Valais, Vaud, Neuchâtel and Geneva, in the Three Lakes Region and in the cantons of Aargau, Zürich, Schaffhausen, Grisons and in Ticino viticulture is practiced. Other fruits commonly cultivated in Switzerland are pears, cherries, plums and strawberries. Ticino, the warmest area in the country, is historically a major producer of chestnuts. It also produces olives.

Meadows and pastures make up three-quarters of farmland. Therefore, Switzerland is much more a pastoral than an agricultural country. It should also be noted that the proportion of the land devoted to pastoral pursuits increases, like the rainfall, from the west to the east, so that it is highest in Appenzell and St. Gallen and lowest in Geneva and Vaud. The number of cattle is about 700 000. In summer they are supported on the ubiquitous pastures, including mountain pastures and alps (the highest in elevation), while in winter they are fed on the hay mown on the lower meadows or purchased from outside. Swiss cheeses and dairy products are internationally well-known.

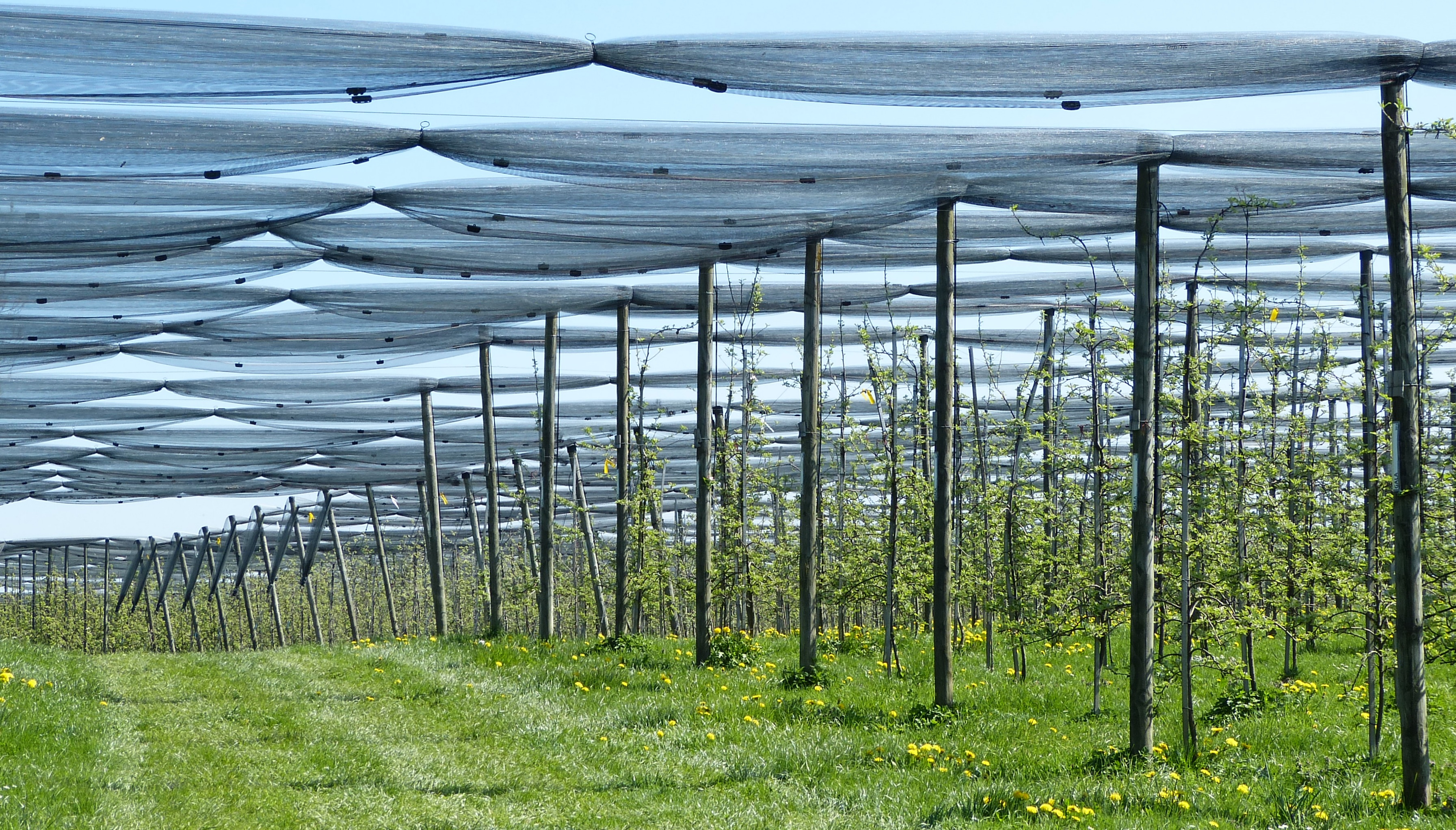
Apples (Thurgau)

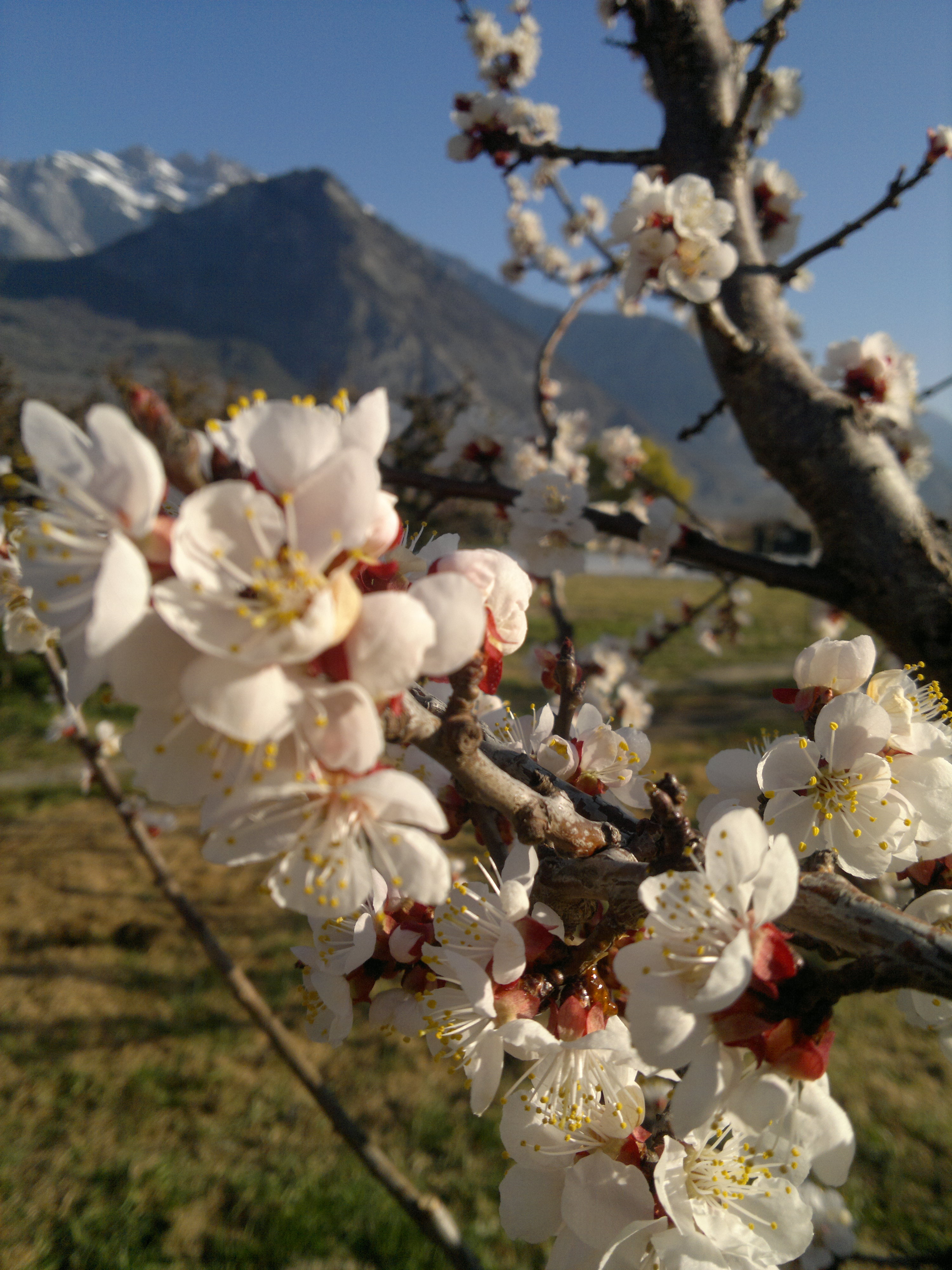
Apricots (Valais)

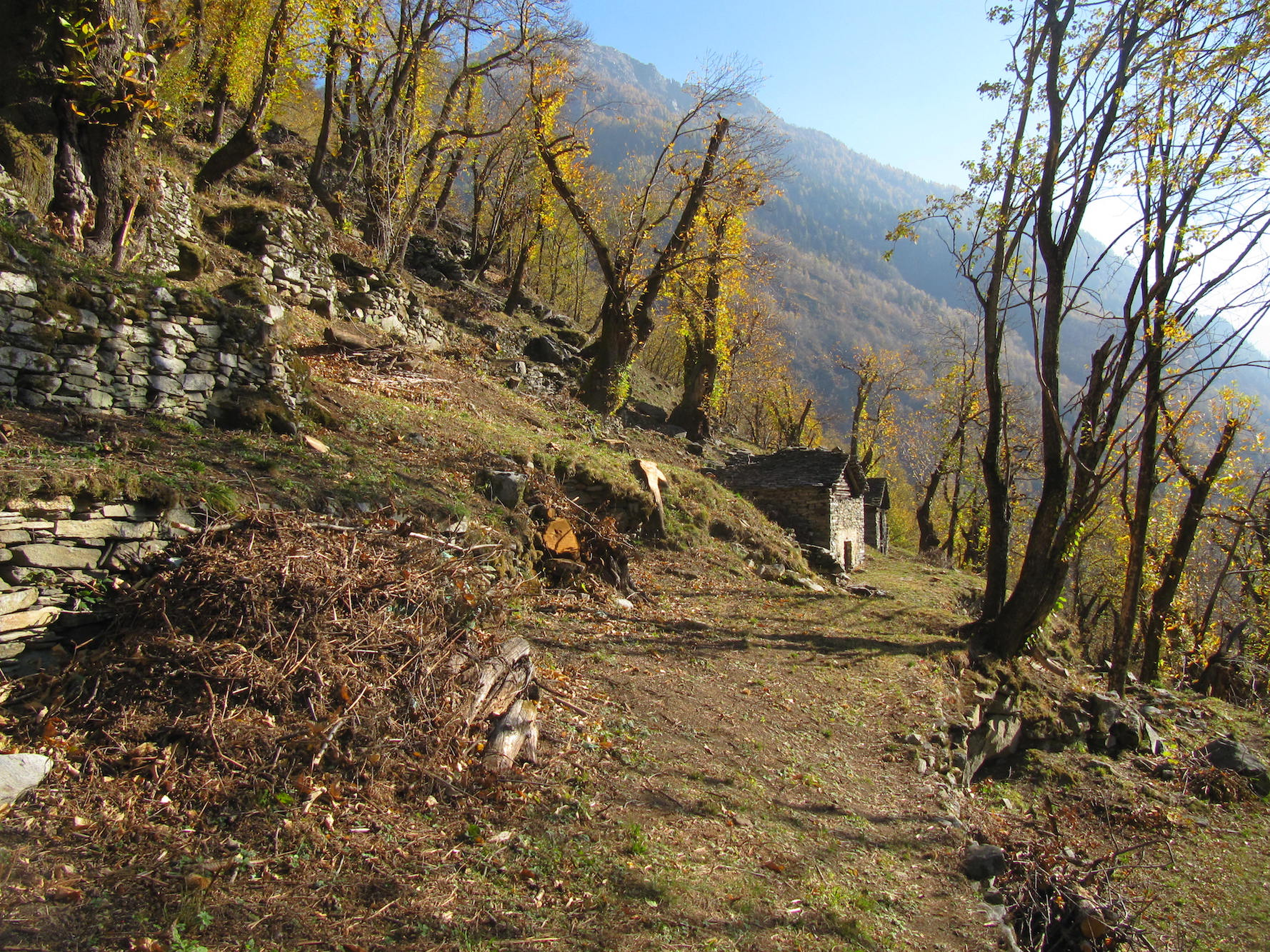
Chestnuts (Ticino)

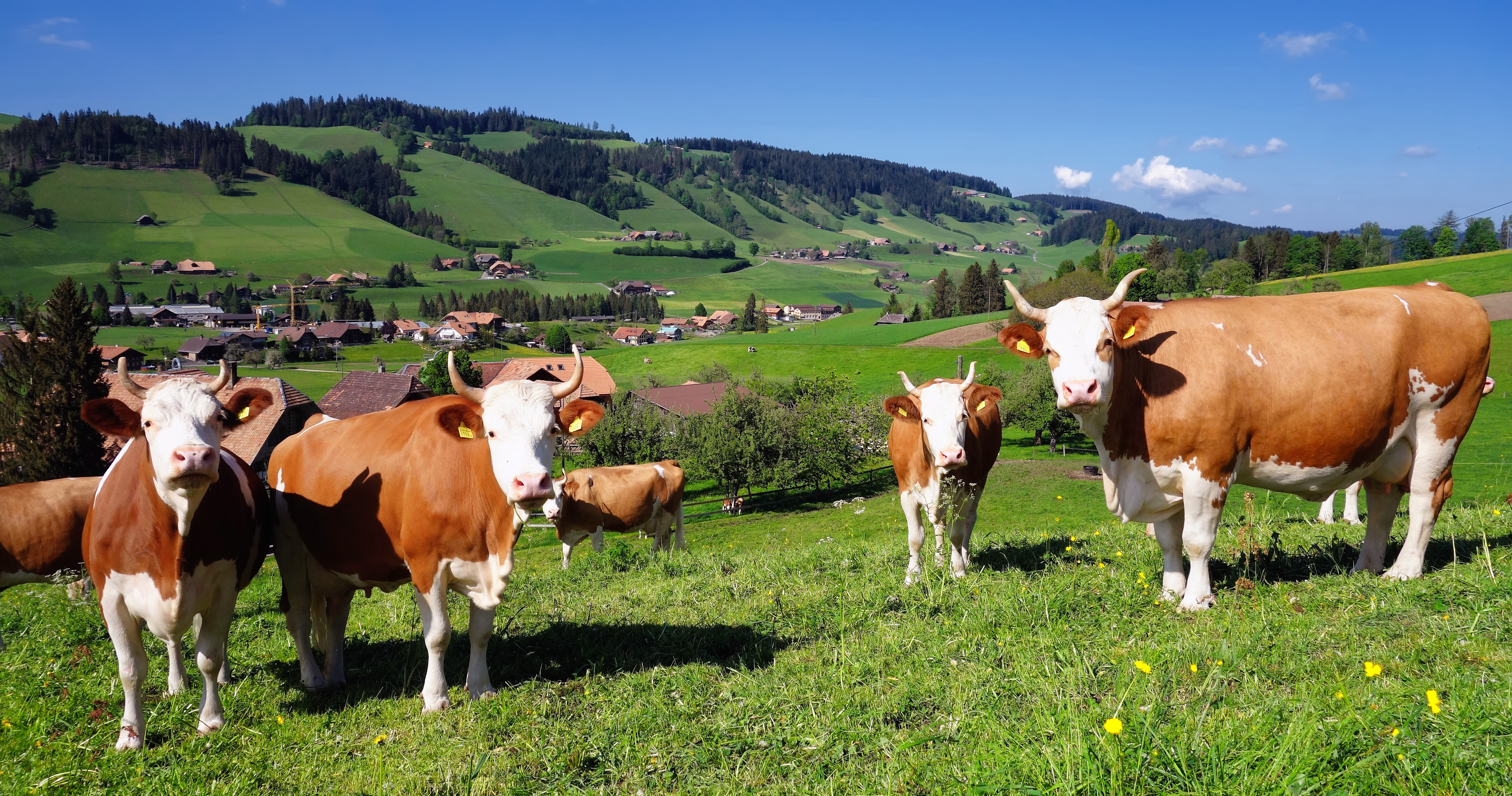
Dairy (Bern)

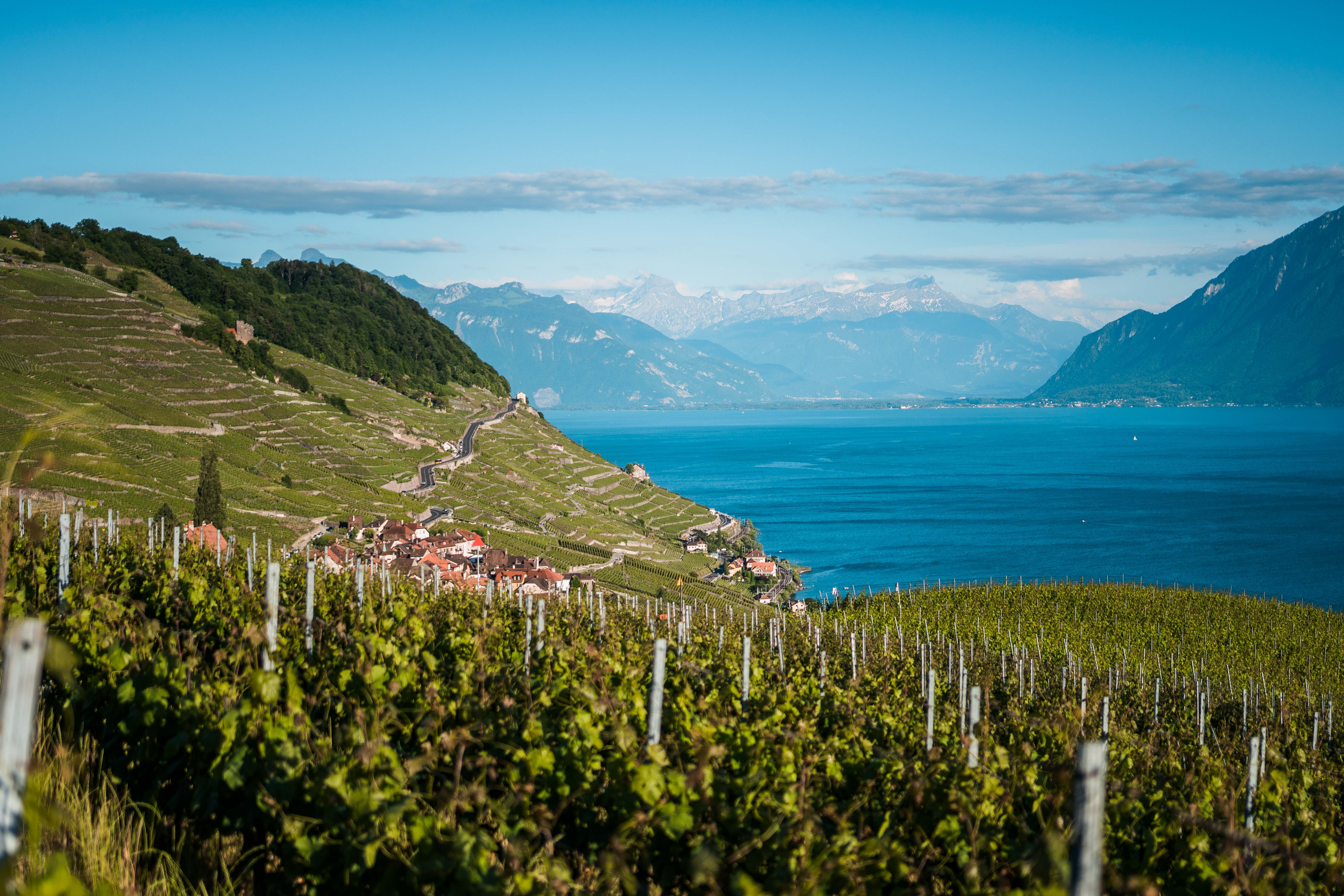
Grapes (Vaud)

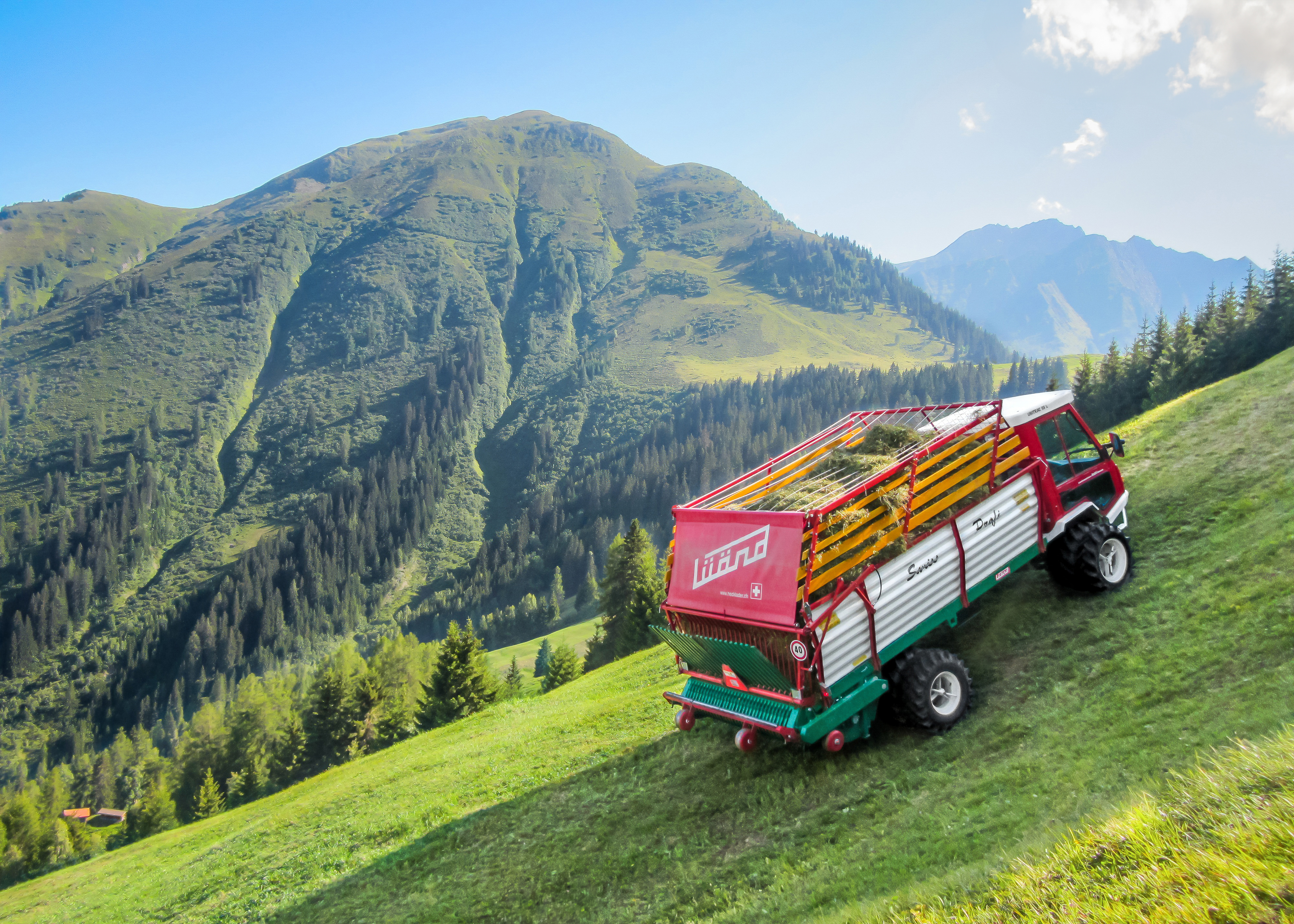
Hay (Grisons)

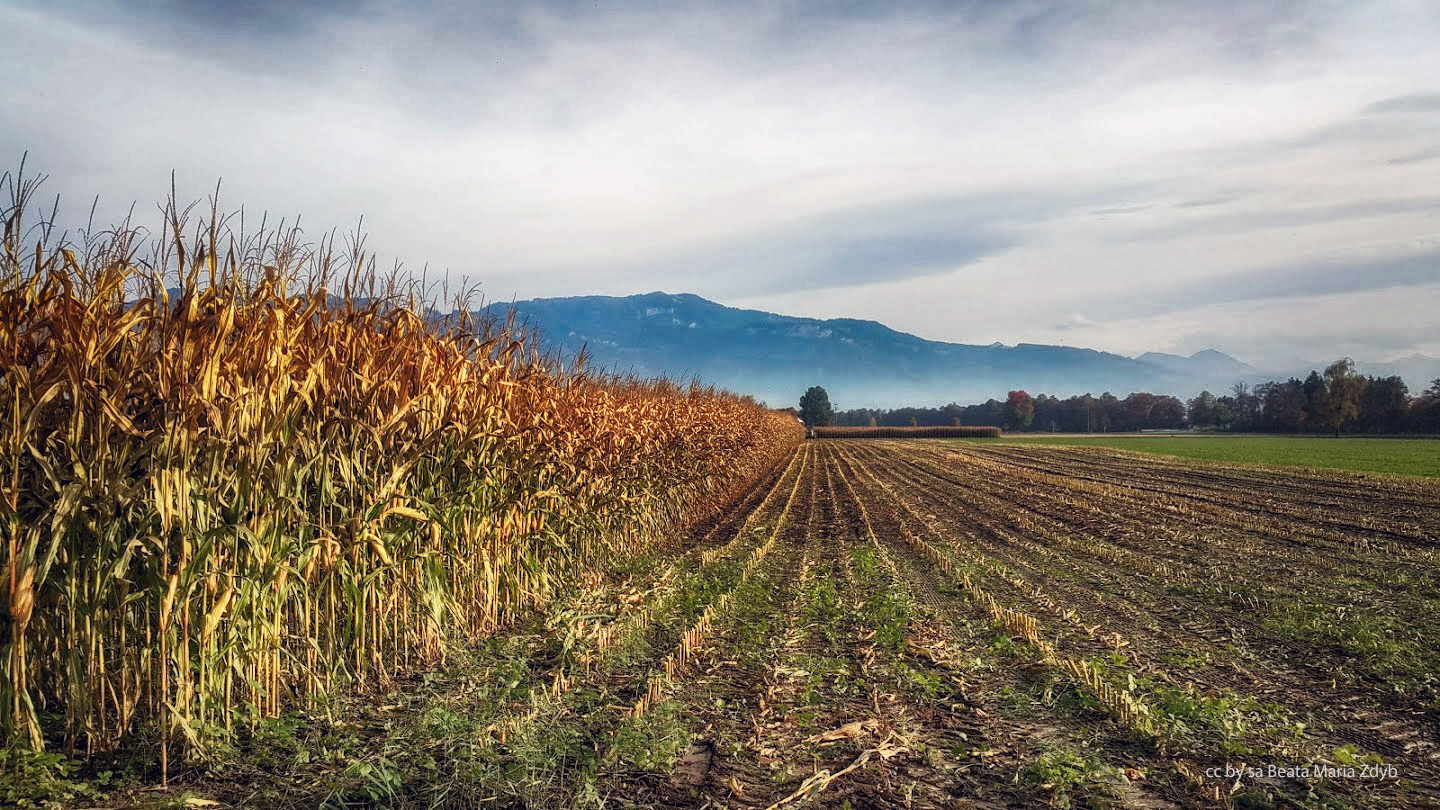
Maize (St. Gallen)

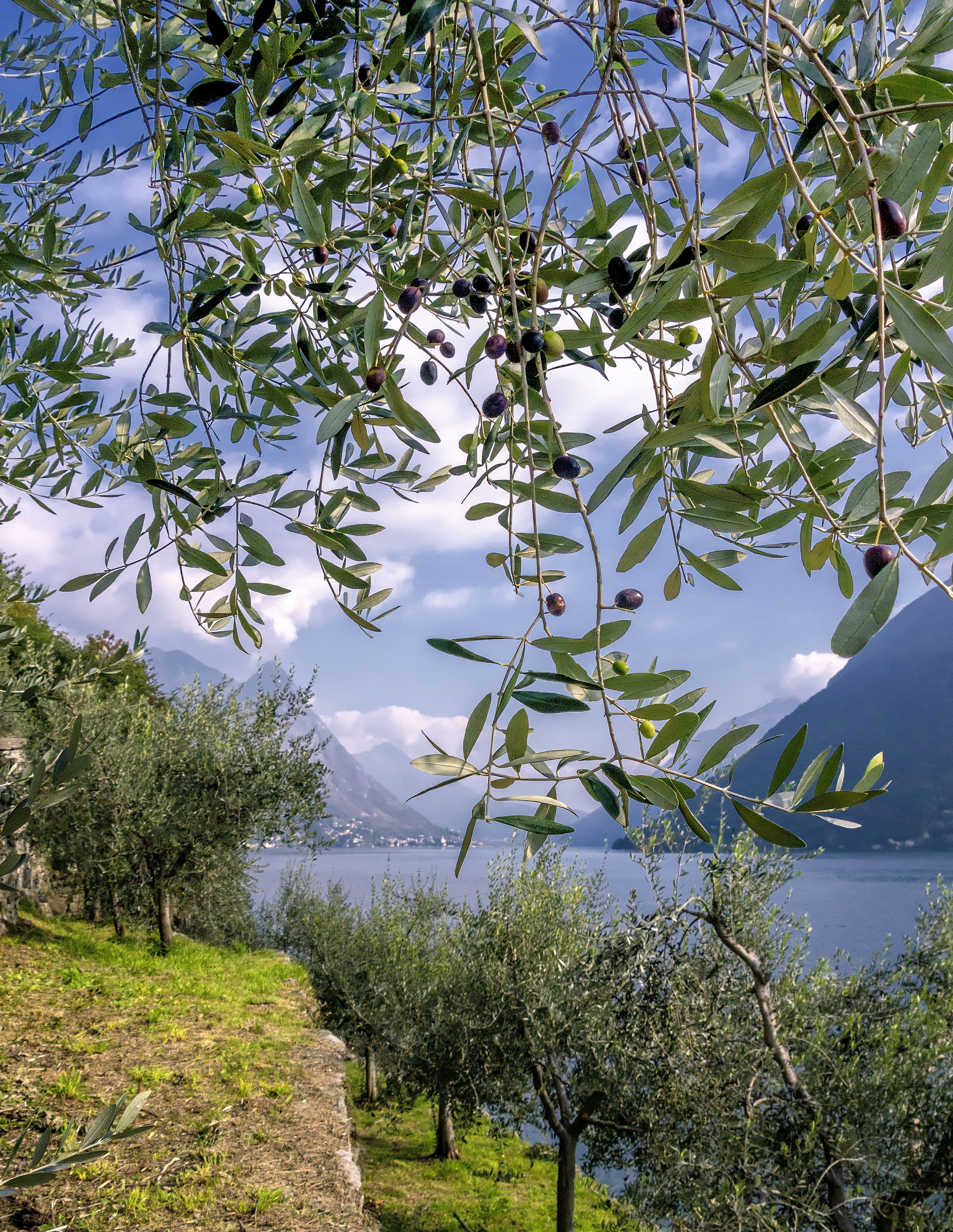
Olives (Ticino)

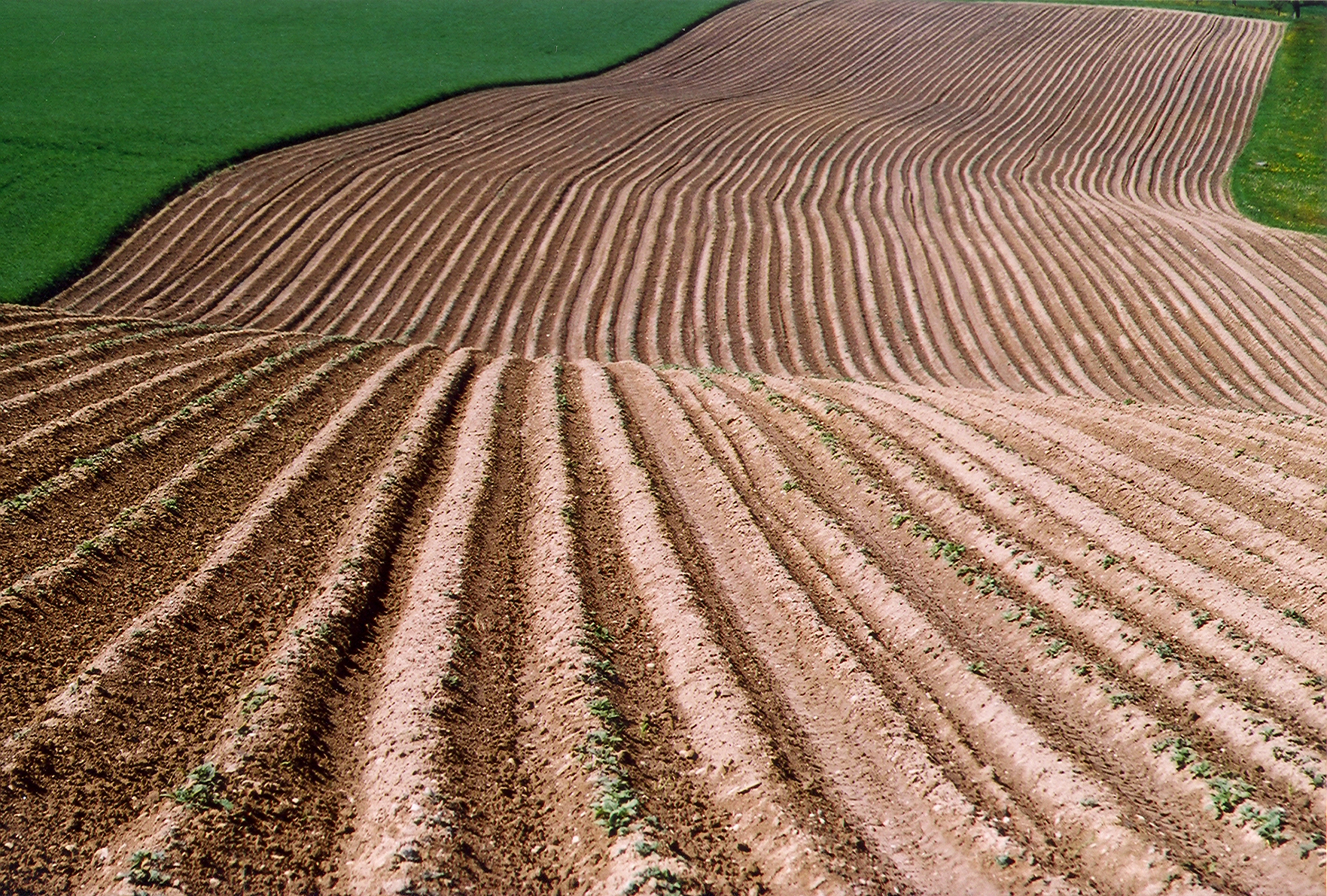
Potatoes (Bern)

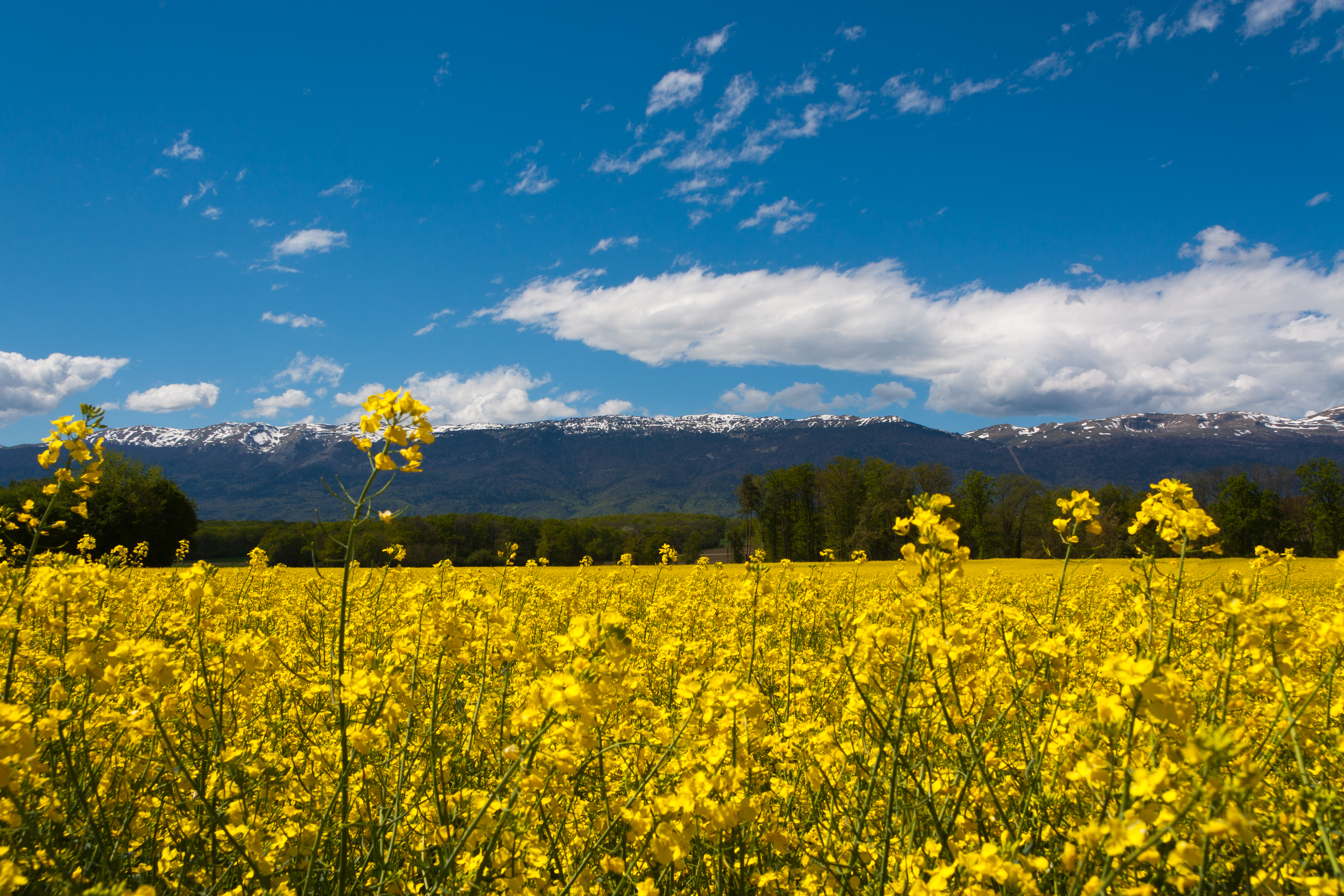
Rapeseed (Geneva)

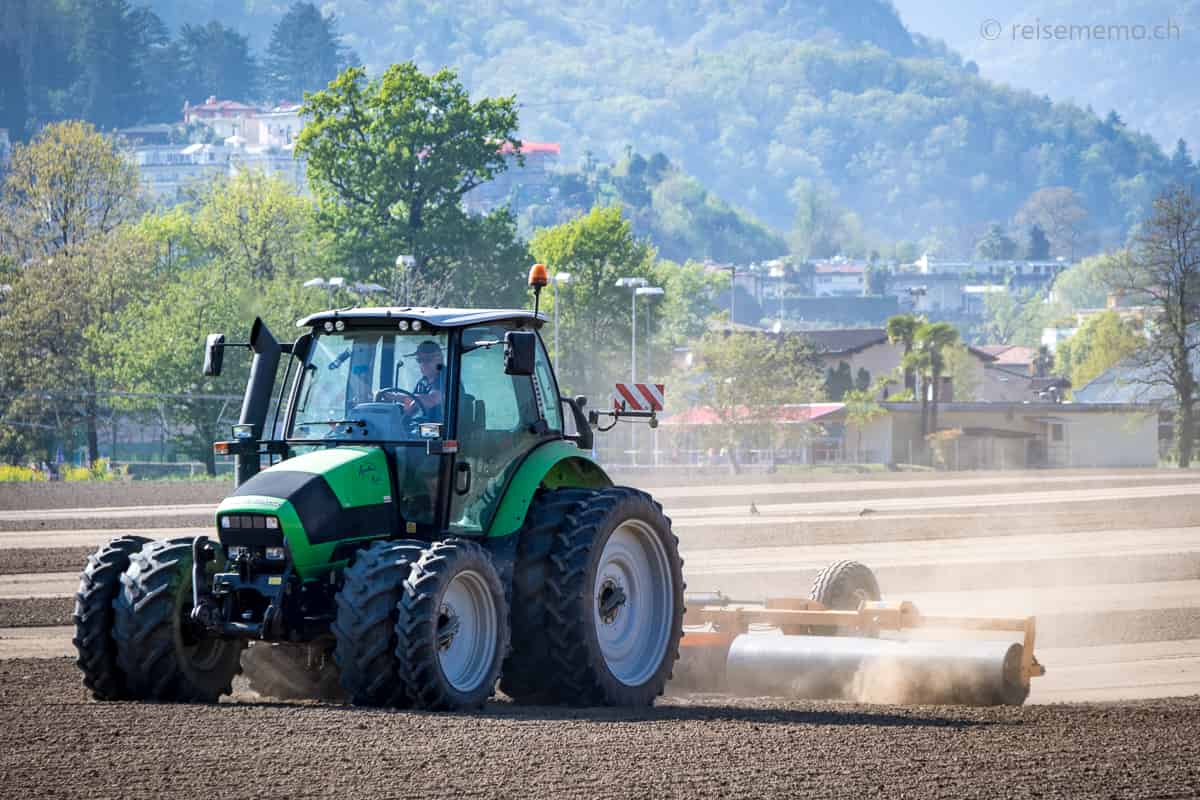
Rice (Ticino)

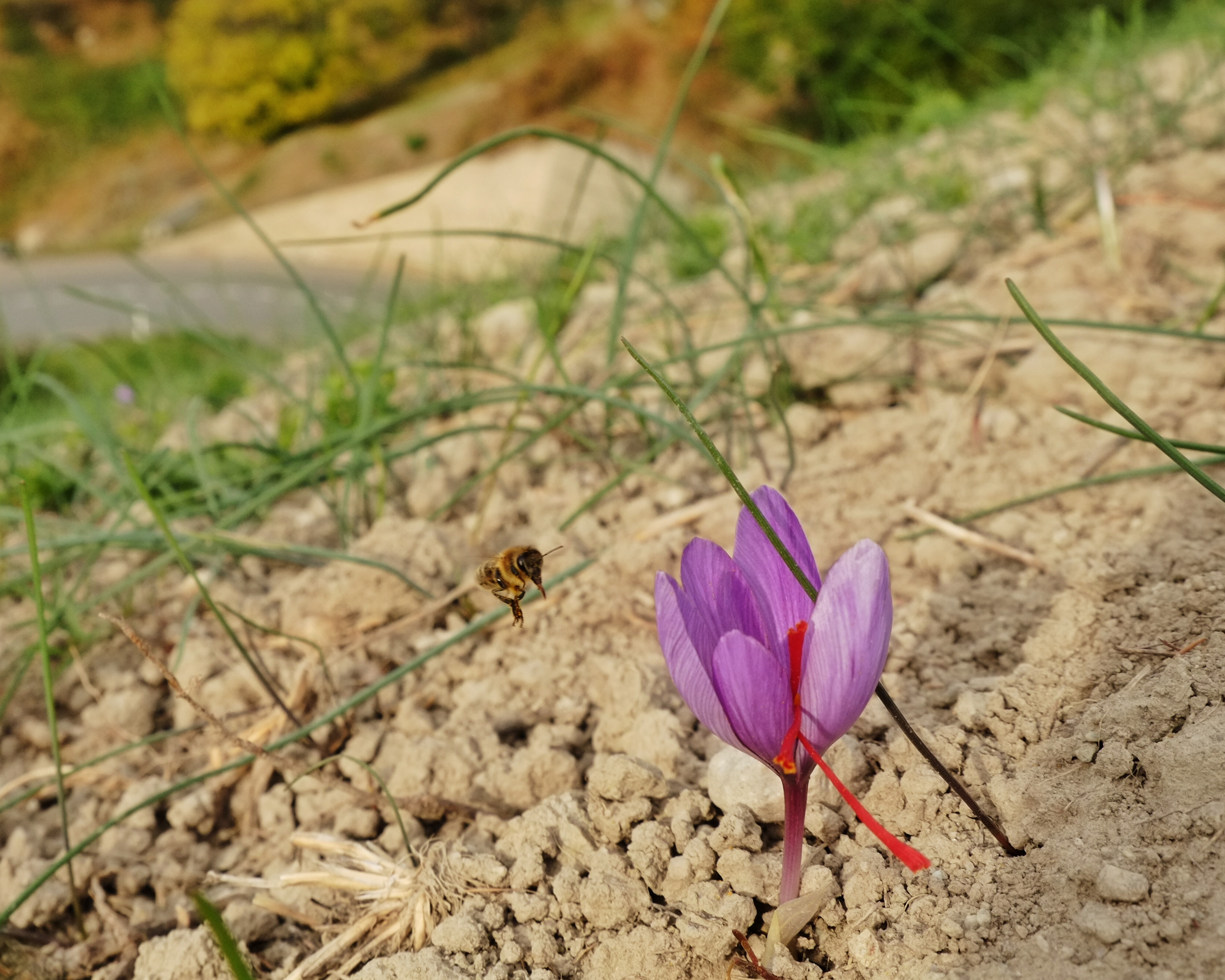
Saffron (Valais)

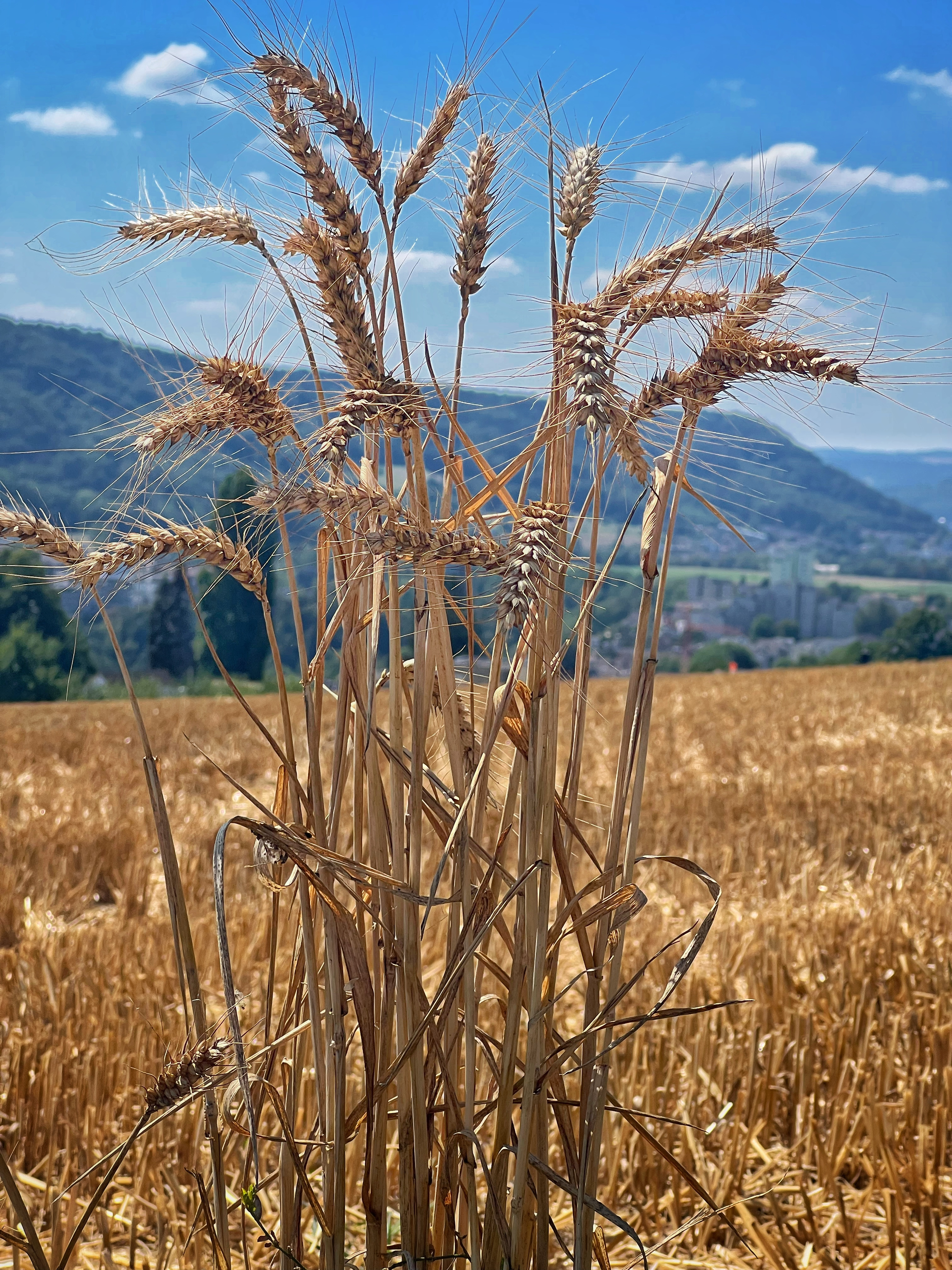
Wheat (Aargau)

== Irrigation ==
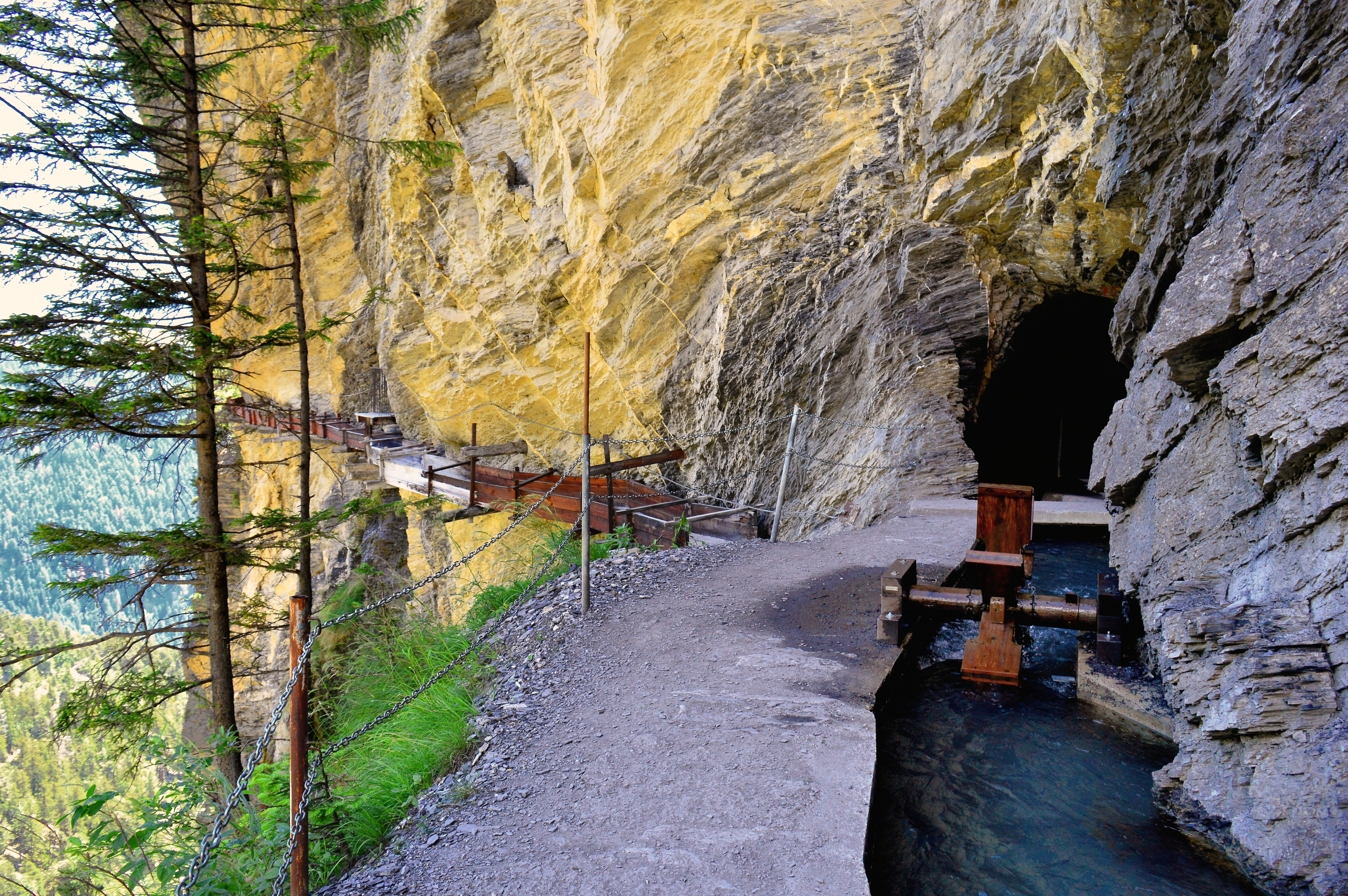
Bisse d'Ayent in Valais

Irrigation in Switzerland is focused in the Alpine valleys with low rainfall (the inner valleys). The best-known system of channels is that of the bisses in Valais (Suonen in Upper Valais). These are attested since the 11th century and they were numerous by the late Middle Ages. For centuries, this system of irrigation saw only a few technical evolutions. In 1900, there were 206 bisses totaling a length of about 1750 km. Sometimes capturing water from glaciers, they were mainly used to irrigate meadows and vineyards. A similar irrigation was also practiced in the Grisons, where mentions of Val Müstair (1211), Heinzenberg and Trin are known in the late Middle Ages. In Ticino, irrigation facilities are attested in 1296 in Giornico. Many other testimonies confirm the use of irrigation techniques in almost all the Alpine valleys.

In the 19th and 20th centuries, the modernization of agriculture, and in particular the use of synthetic fertilizers on a large scale from 1950, reduced the importance of irrigation. If the installations continue to be used in the Alpine valleys and in particular in Valais, the irrigated meadows have strongly regressed on the Plateau. During the second half of the 20th century, irrigation regained importance, but in the more technical form of watering parks, sports grounds and for horticulture.

== Economy ==
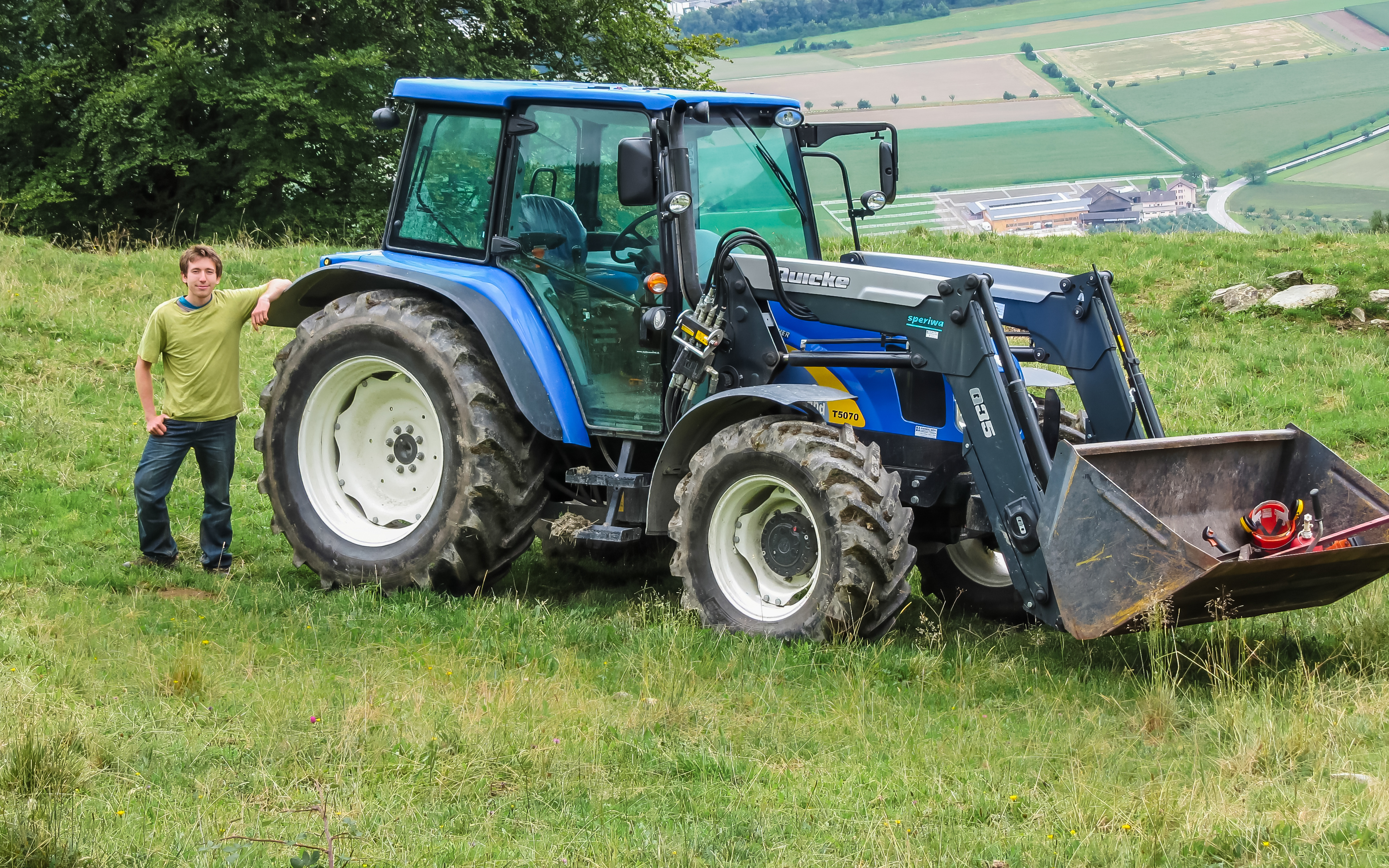
Swiss farmer with a New Holland tractor on a hayfield in Malans

The primary sector occupies a minimal place in the Swiss economy because the costs do not allow sales abroad without state aid amounting to billions of francs. These aids, which allow a good number of landscape farmers to live in reasonable conditions, are defined by a constitutional article. Historically, this integration of agricultural policy into the Swiss institutional framework is explained by the need to ensure the country's food independence within a conflicting European geopolitical space. However, since the end of the Second World War, and even more so since the constitutional reforms of the end of the 1990s, a reorientation of aid towards the protection of soils and landscapes (independently of the production levels) have been implemented. Despite this trend, in 2018, half of federal agricultural subsidies were poured into the processing and distribution chains, while the other half was dedicated directly to the peasantry.

== Statistics ==
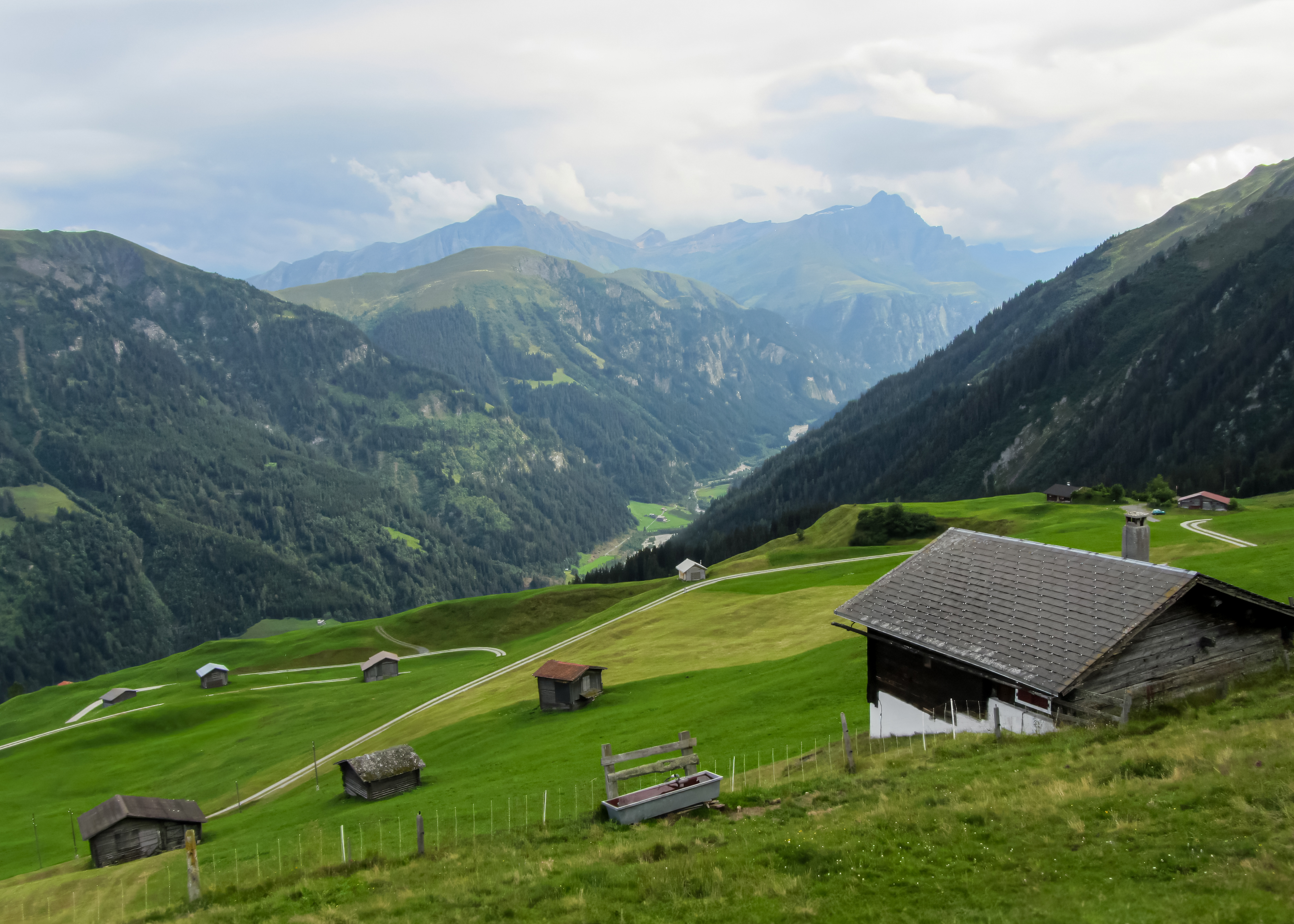
Farms in Tenna

According to the 2010 agricultural report of the Federal Office for Agriculture (FOAG), Switzerland has 60 034 agricultural farms, and 166 722 people were engaged in agriculture, mostly family labour. Since the beginning of 2000, agriculture has seen the disappearance of 10 000 farms and 37 000 workers. The potential for reduction of small structures is now largely exhausted, notes the FOAG. The average agricultural income was around 60 000 Swiss francs in 2009. On the other hand, the agricultural sector is heavily indebted with a debt factor — i.e. the theoretical number of years to repay a loan — which has increased by more than a year and a half since 2000.

Fertile arable land is constantly shrinking in Switzerland. The area statistics for 2005 show that between 1985 and 1997, agricultural and alpine areas decreased by 482 km^{2} (186 sq mi). Most (64%) of this area has been allocated to housing (urbanization), the rest has turned into forest, mainly on steep highlands.

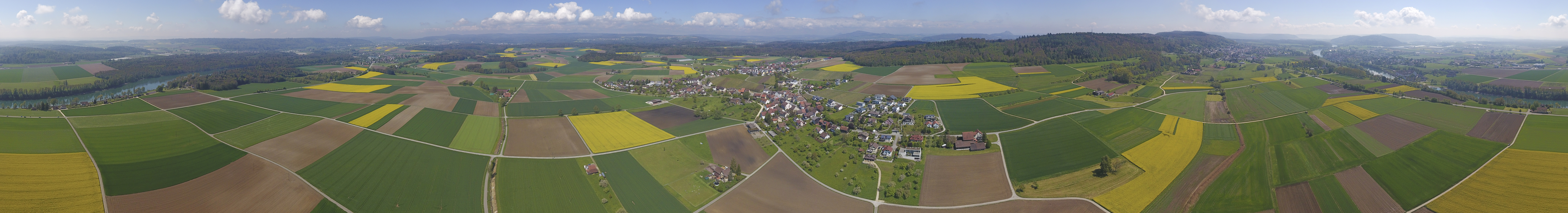
Agriculture in the canton of Schaffhausen

== Organic farming and GMOs ==
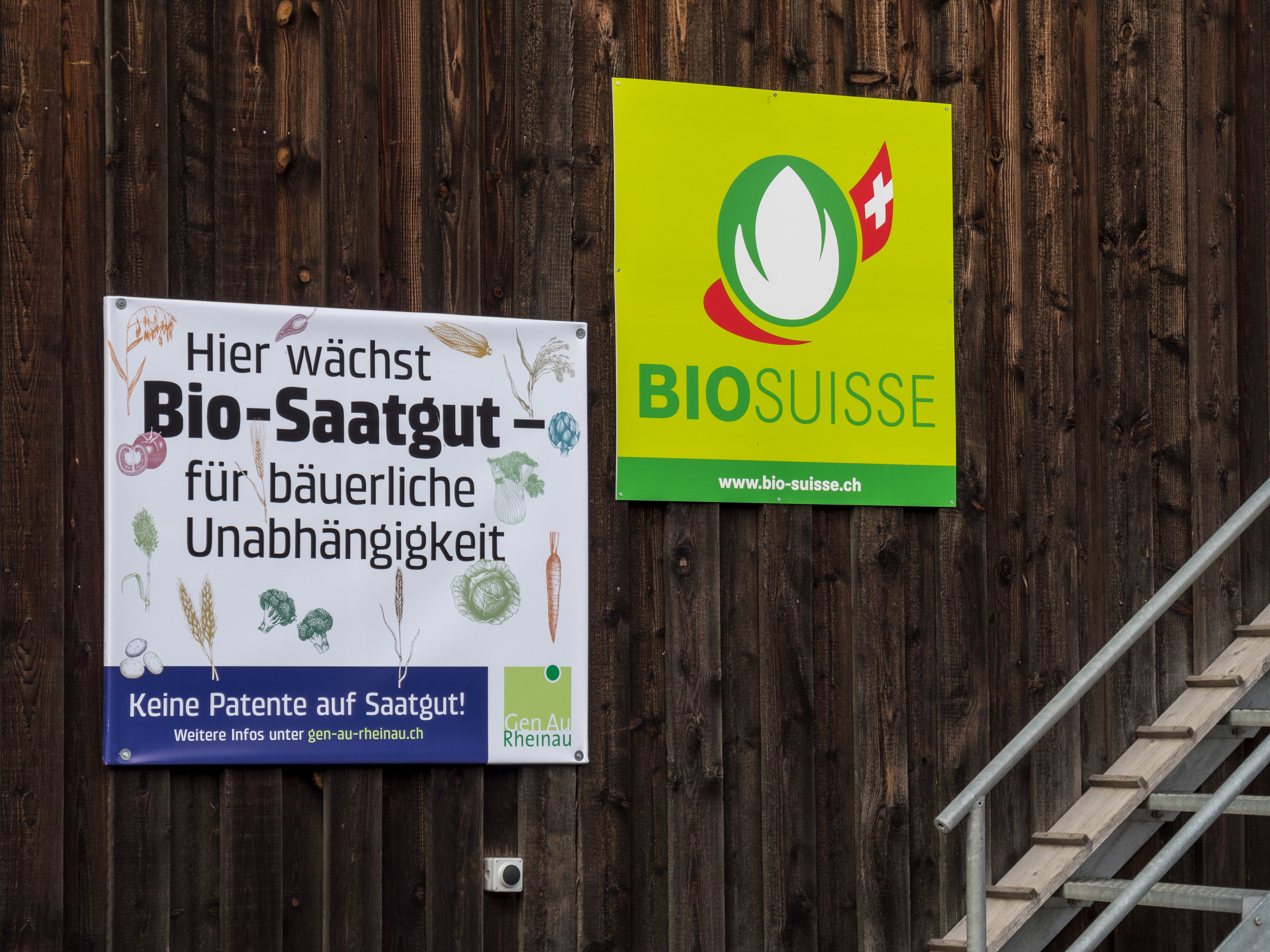
Organic farm

Consumption of Organic Products and restrictions on the use of fertilizers and pesticides are beginning to gain in importance. The controls are very strict and are one of the main factors benefiting the image of Swiss agriculture, which relies on the quality of its products rather than their price. At least 7% of the cultivable area of each farm on the Plateau is reserved for uncultivated meadows (extensive farming) for which it receives from the Confederation up to 1,500 francs per hectare in compensation. In principle, a meadow should not be mowed before June 15. In addition, since 2004, they are required to take measures to limit the impact of their activities on fauna and flora such as mowing in strips or starting inside to finish outwards and not grinding immediately after cutting.

Genetically modified organisms are particularly controversial in Switzerland. A fourth moratorium was adopted on 2 December 2021 almost unanimously by the Council of States: the use of these organisms in agriculture remains prohibited until the end of 2025. Previously, during a popular initiative submitted to the people on 27 November 2005, the Swiss voted (55.7%) for a five-year moratorium on the use of GMOs, thus opposing the will of their government at the time and validating an application of the precautionary principle endorsed at the 1992 Rio Summit.

== See also ==
- Agroscope
- Appellation d'origine protégée (Switzerland)
- Fishing industry in Switzerland
- List of Swiss cattle breeds
- List of Swiss goat breeds
- ProSpecieRara
- Architecture in Switzerland#Vernacular architecture - rural architecture
