= Chestnut orchard =

Open stand of grafted chestnut trees for fruit production

A chestnut orchard is an open stand of grafted chestnut (selva castanile) trees for fruit production. In this agroforestry system, trees are usually intercropped with cereals, hay or pasture. These orchards are traditional systems in Canton of Ticino (Switzerland) and Northern Italy, where they are called “selva castanile”. Similar systems can also be found in the Mediterranean region, for example, in France, Greece, Portugal or Spain.

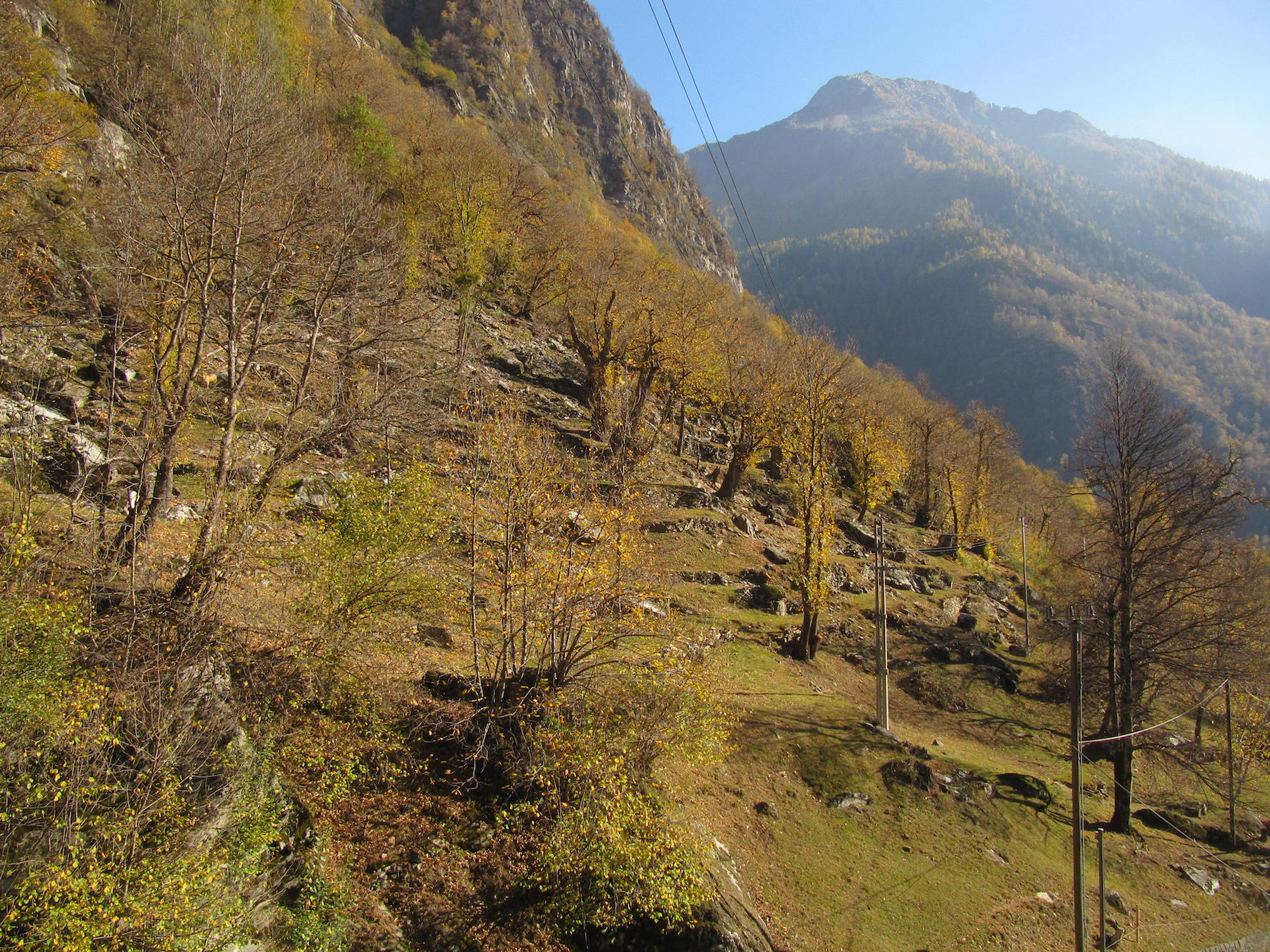
Traditional chestnut orchard (or "selva castanile") in Valle di Peccia, Canton of Ticino, Switzerland

== History ==
The chestnut tree was once known as the "bread tree". This name has its origins in the fact that chestnuts were widespread in Southern Europe and the use of its fruit abundant, thanks also to its healthy nutritional values. In addition to the fruits, the chestnut tree offered people wood, leaves, flowers and permitted honey production, thus becoming in certain historical periods of vital importance for the rural population (hence the term "Chestnut Civilization", in the sense of material and cultural organization of the mountain people based on the cultivation of this tree).

Already in the Middle Ages, the importance of this fruit in the diet of rural farmers was known, especially in times of isolation caused by the temporary disintegration of socio-economic structures or the trade network, which meant that the mountain population had to provide more autonomously for their supply.

After the Middle Ages, in various mountainous regions of Italy and in Ticino, where the development of livelihoods such as fishing, trade or rich pastoralism was prevented, the local population specialized in the cultivation of chestnut orchards. In fact, the tree can also grow on marginal land, thus leaving the best land to cereal crops.

At the beginning of the 20th century, chestnuts were still the main staple food of the mountain people for most of the year. An advantage of the chestnut tree was that its fruits could be dried and preserved until the next harvest, thus constituting a lifeline in the event of famine. Around 1919, the author Merz estimated the annual consumption at about 100 kg per capita. Therefore, each mountain dweller depended directly on the production of two or more chestnut trees.

The importance of chestnuts was also evident in various traditions and customs, such as the offering of chestnuts as a wedding gift or for funeral ceremonies, for paying taxes or as a life annuity for widows.

=== Decline of the chestnut orchards ===
The neglect of chestnut production was accentuated in the 19th century due to various causes:

- replacement of chestnuts as a staple food with maize and potatoes;
- improvement of agricultural techniques;
- modernisation of communication routes (particularly the railway network) which permitted a better food trade with people living far from the main centers;
- emigration of rural people to industrial areas;
- possibility of selling wood and bark from old chestnut trees for the production of tannin, used in the tanning industry.

Afterwards, the decline worsened due to the two main diseases of the chestnut tree: the Ink disease and the Chestnut blight. The chestnut orchards were gradually abandoned because of the difficulties in maintaining them and their diminished yield. More and more orchards were invaded by other tree species, thus decreasing not only the area planted with chestnuts but also the vitality of the trees, which are unable to withstand the competition of wild individuals.

In addition, even the chestnut as food has suffered a fall in popularity, remaining important only as a base for cakes, as a side dish, for festive occasions or as roasted chestnuts. Today, per capita consumption is around 1 kg per person per year.

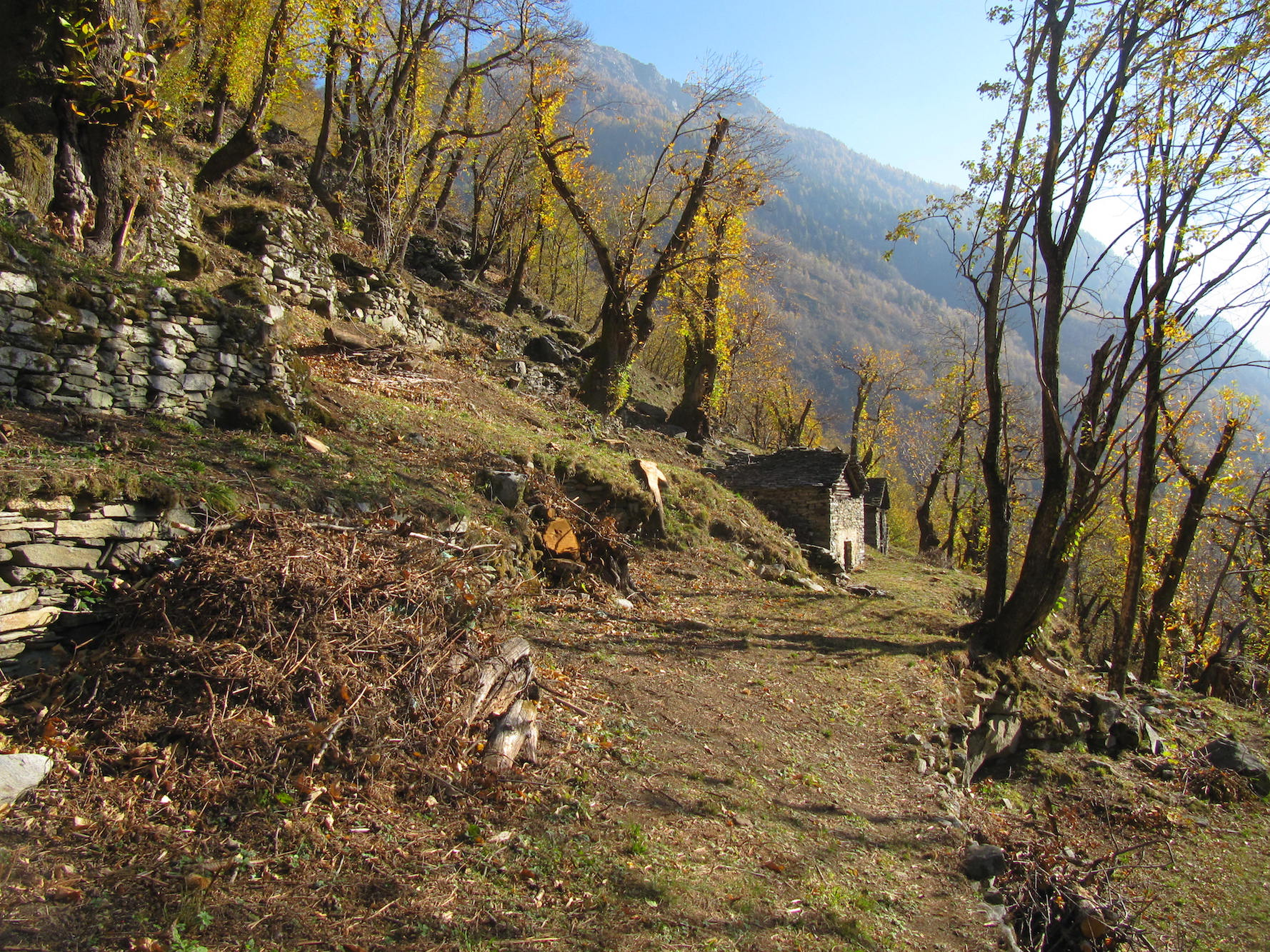
Restored chestnut orchard in Valle di Peccia, Canton of Ticino, Switzerland

=== The situation today ===
Since the nineties there has been a renewed interest in the chestnut orchards. More and more local authorities and populations have begun to restore abandoned chestnut orchards. The reasons for this were mainly the idea of a return to the traditions and cultural values of past civilizations, the need to enhance the rural landscape, or the willingness to create economic and tourist initiatives for rural areas. In addition, there was also the desire to rediscover the chestnut as a healthy and natural food, versatile and easy to use, that can be valorised in the context of the general return to organic products and to the genuine cuisine. Since then, many chestnut orchards have been recovered in Ticino and in the Italian Grisons and the foundations have been set for their multifunctional and sustainable management.

== Agroforestry ==
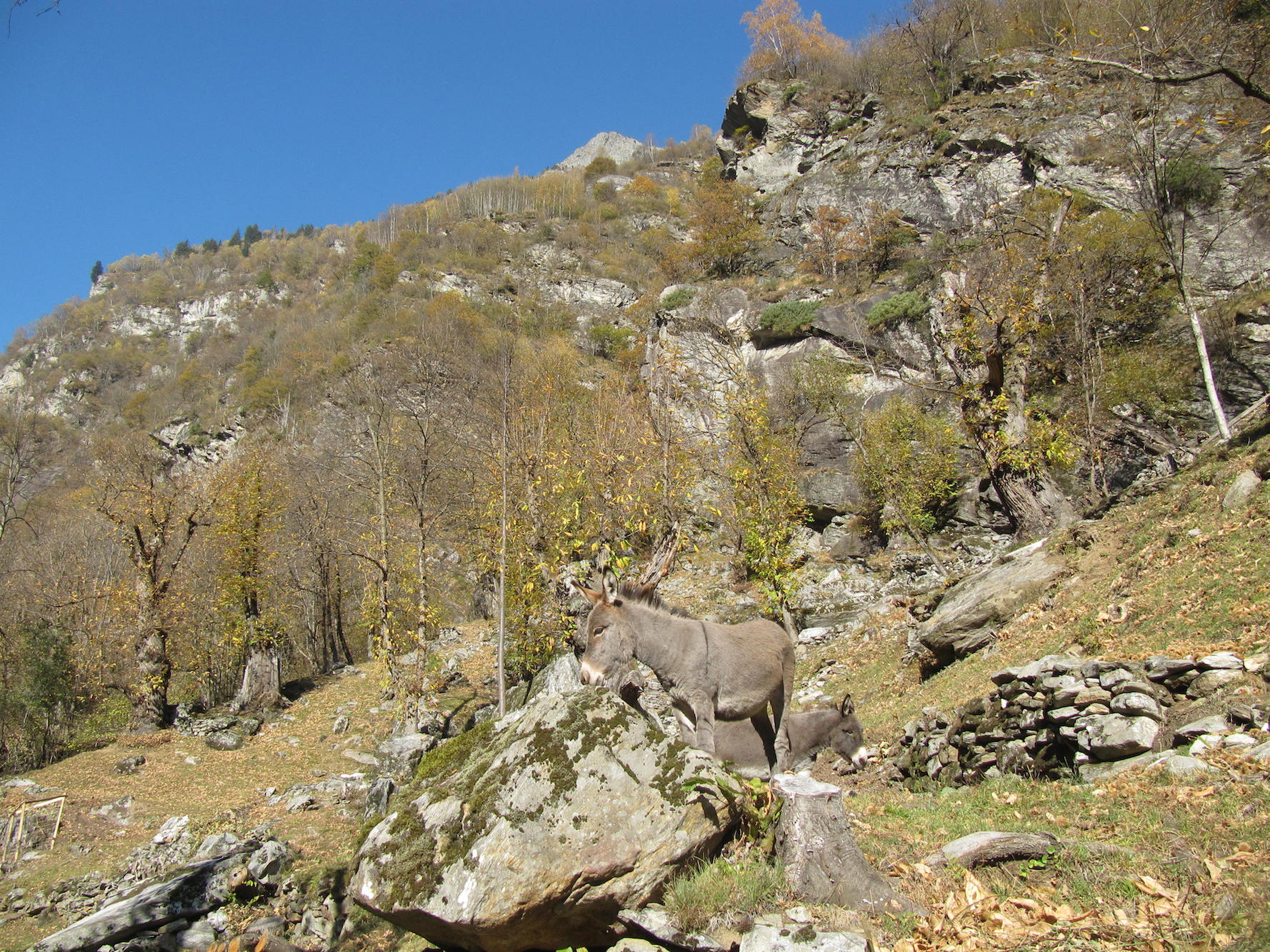
Chestnut orchard with donkeys grazing, Canton of Ticino, Switzerland

Agroforestry can be seen as a particular form of intercropping, where trees are integrated in the agricultural system. In the case of chestnut orchards, the production of the trees is central. Thus, this system can be considered as high value tree agroforestry. A chestnut orchard can be divided in three different production levels. The trees are the first level, producing edible fruits, forage and wood. At the second level comes the companion crop, which can be either a cereal, mushroom or hay. And lastly, at the third level comes the animals, which can pasture under the trees; in such a case, the agroforestry system is more specifically called a silvopastoral system.

=== Silvopastoral System ===
The silvopastoral system is one form of agroforestry, where one level of the three-level system is a pasture used for grazing domesticated animals. In the north west of Spain for example, chestnut-silvopastoral systems are often linked to pork production.

== Products ==
The traditional chestnut orchards are multifunctional systems. They offer a high variety of products, ranging from chestnuts and animal products to ecosystem services such as protection against erosion.

The trees produce chestnuts, which are very interesting fruits with a high nutritional value, leaves that can be used as fodder and litter and flowers that allow honey production. The timber is much appreciated for many purposes due to its aesthetic qualities and its resistance to meteorological alteration.

Chestnut orchards can be used for mushroom picking or to grow berry bushes. In Ticino, sheep and goats are traditionally grazing in the chestnut orchards, whereas in Spain, pigs are grazing and feeding on the left fruits during the fattening period. Such systems also provide the animals with protection against weather hazards.

As a silvopastoral system, chestnut orchards also provide many ecological, economical and social services.

== Economic potential ==
Thanks to their numerous high quality products, the chestnut orchards have an interesting economic potential. The market opportunities for chestnut forest products have recently begun to expand, after a long lasting decline due to sanitary problems and to reduced demand. These new market opportunities have been created by the growing demand for natural products and technical innovation in the processing of these products.

The demand for traditional products, once only consumed by the low-income classes, is now perceived as more natural and environmentally friendly, and is widely growing in all highly industrialised countries. However, the use of new technologies is essential to solve the issues related to the variability of production and the difficult preservation of the products of the chestnut orchards, so that they can take advantage of the opportunity offered by these new market niches.

Technological improvement, in particular new developments in harvesting and processing technologies, have opened up new market opportunities for traditional chestnuts products, which can now be valorised and preserved at their best. Another interesting economical characteristic of the chestnut orchards is to provide both market (food, wood products, and fodder) and nonmarket goods and services (soil conservation, water and air quality improvement, biodiversity and scenic beauty), thus contributing to a diversified rural economy and effective environmental protection. For this reason, rural development policies are also creating favourable conditions to propagate chestnut initiatives. One of these initiatives is Agenda 2000, which promote the chestnuts orchards to diversificate the rural activities and obtain new sources of non-agricultural income in European Union member countries.

== Ecological aspects ==
This system has beneficial effects on soil. The deep roots of chestnut trees and planted shrubs can maintain a better soil structure. Therefore, water retention is improved and soil erosion reduced. Deep rooting can also lead to a reduction of nutrient leaching because deep roots are able to absorb the nutrients which leached below the rooting zone of the grasses.

The system is reducing greenhouse gas emissions due to two different aspects. First the carbon loss of the growing plants and the soil is lower because of the properties of the system. Methane production of the feeding animals in silvopastoral systems is also reduced. Additionally, silvopastoral system can produce more meat per area because to highly efficient food production of the system. This may lead to a higher mitigation of greenhouse gases.

The potential of carbon sequestration of chestnut orchards is high compared to pastures only or cropping fields. This three-level system could play an important role in the mitigation of the climate change.

Lastly, the chestnut orchard is able to increase the biodiversity on several trophic levels. First, the number of plants increased due to planted shrubs and chestnut trees. Secondly these plants provide niches for invertebrate and vertebrate species. For example, it is described that the number of birds increased in three-level systems compared to pasture and woodland systems. Moreover, it is shown that the number of earthworms and other soil invertebrates also rise with beneficial effects on soil properties.

== Social value ==
Recently, in many European countries, projects are being implemented to subsidise the restoring of chestnut growing areas, also for the role of chestnuts orchards in preserving landscape and country's traditional heritage. The chestnut orchards and their products, despite having been abandoned for a long time, are still perceived by a large part of the European population as local and traditional products and are therefore well-accepted. Moreover, the chestnut orchards have recently been restored also for their aesthetic values, and in many countries there is a positive trade off between chestnut production and tourism.

== Challenges ==
=== Diseases ===
Historically, chestnut production decline was accompanied by the diffusion of two important diseases:

- Ink disease caused by Phytophthora cambivora,
- Chestnut blight due to Cryphonectria parasitica.

This latter one, which is a fungal pathogen, is now under control thanks to the spontaneous diffusion of a hypovirulent form of the disease. In regard to the Ink disease, today this pathogen is less common but from time to time it is possible to assist to improvise death of entire orchards at a local scale.

Nowadays, the recent problem of the chestnut gall wasp (Dryocosmus kuriphilus Yasumatsu) should be overcome thanks to the introduction of its natural antagonist, Torymus sinensis Kamijo, provenient from China as well.

Another pathogen is Mycosphaerella maculiformis, a fungus which attacks the leaves which wilt and fall prematurely from the tree. The trees do not die, but they are weakened and will produce less fruits.

=== Climate change ===
Nowadays, the biggest issue is climate change, and the more frequent very warm and dry or very cold and wet summers. In these climatic conditions, primary and secondary pathogen pressure is higher and therefore abundant harvests are put under risk. In 2003, the excessive heat during the summer caused tree leaves to wilt in July and August already, resulting in a poor chestnut production.

=== Trade-offs ===
The intercropping of chestnuts with other crops could lead to light competition due to the big canopy of chestnut trees. As the system is more complex, the workload might be increased. Therefore, such systems have to be assessed carefully before being implemented.

== See also ==
- Chestnut production in Switzerland
