= List of Swiss breads =

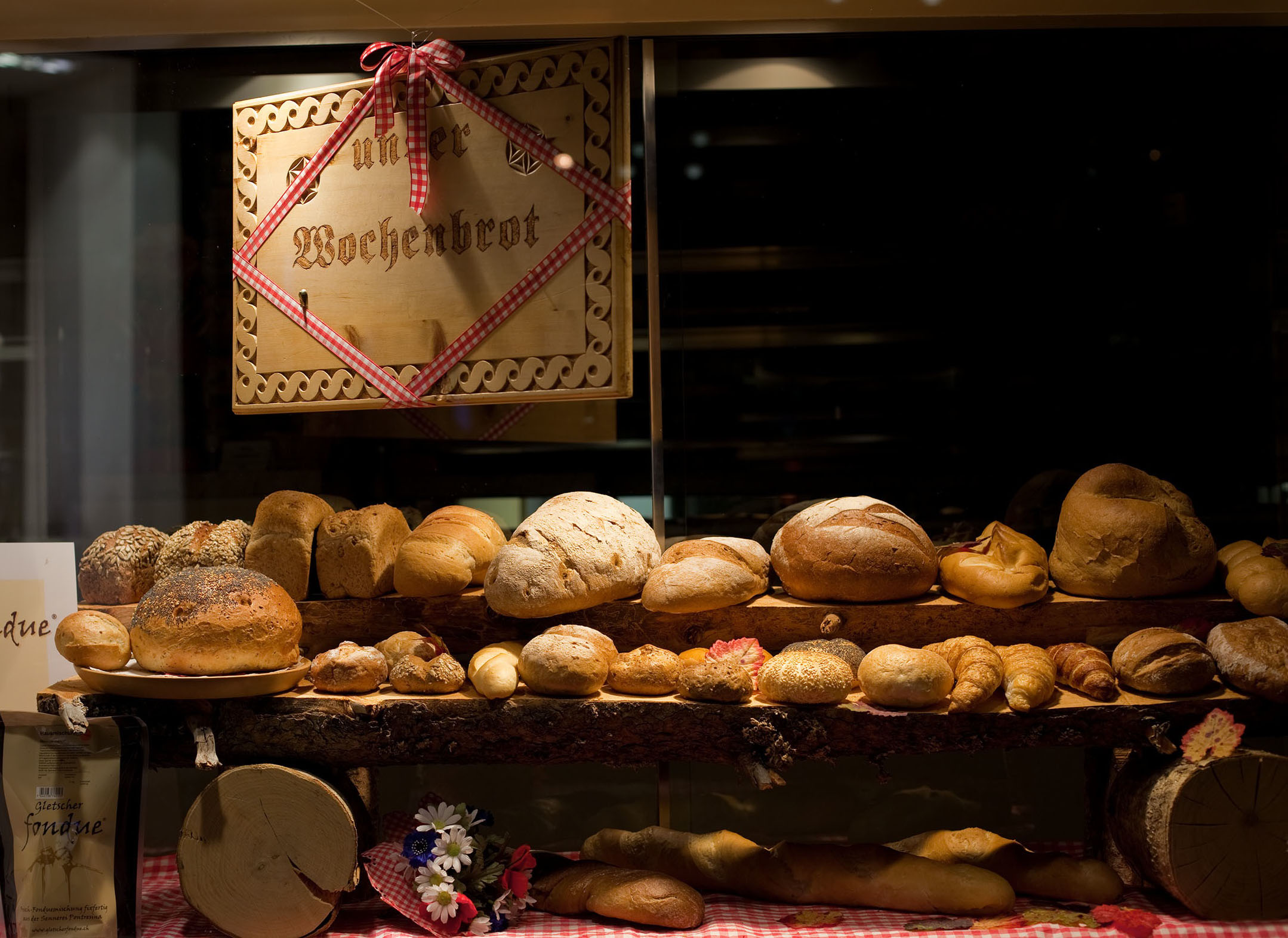
A variety of breads sold in a St. Moritz bakery

Bread has been a staple food in Switzerland for millennia, probably since the dawn of agriculture. The Swiss Plateau is the main cereal region of the country.

Nowadays, bread is consumed by almost all Swiss and accompanies practically every meal, making it an integral part of Swiss cuisine. There are several hundred different types of Swiss bread, owing to the diversity of culture and traditions found in the country.

This list includes national, regional and sweet breads.

== Swiss breads ==
=== National breads ===
- Burebrot
- Bürli (Ballon)
- Schlumbergerli
- Weggli (Petits pains, panini)
- Zopf
- Zürcher Murren
- Zürcher Brot (Langbrot)

=== Regional breads ===
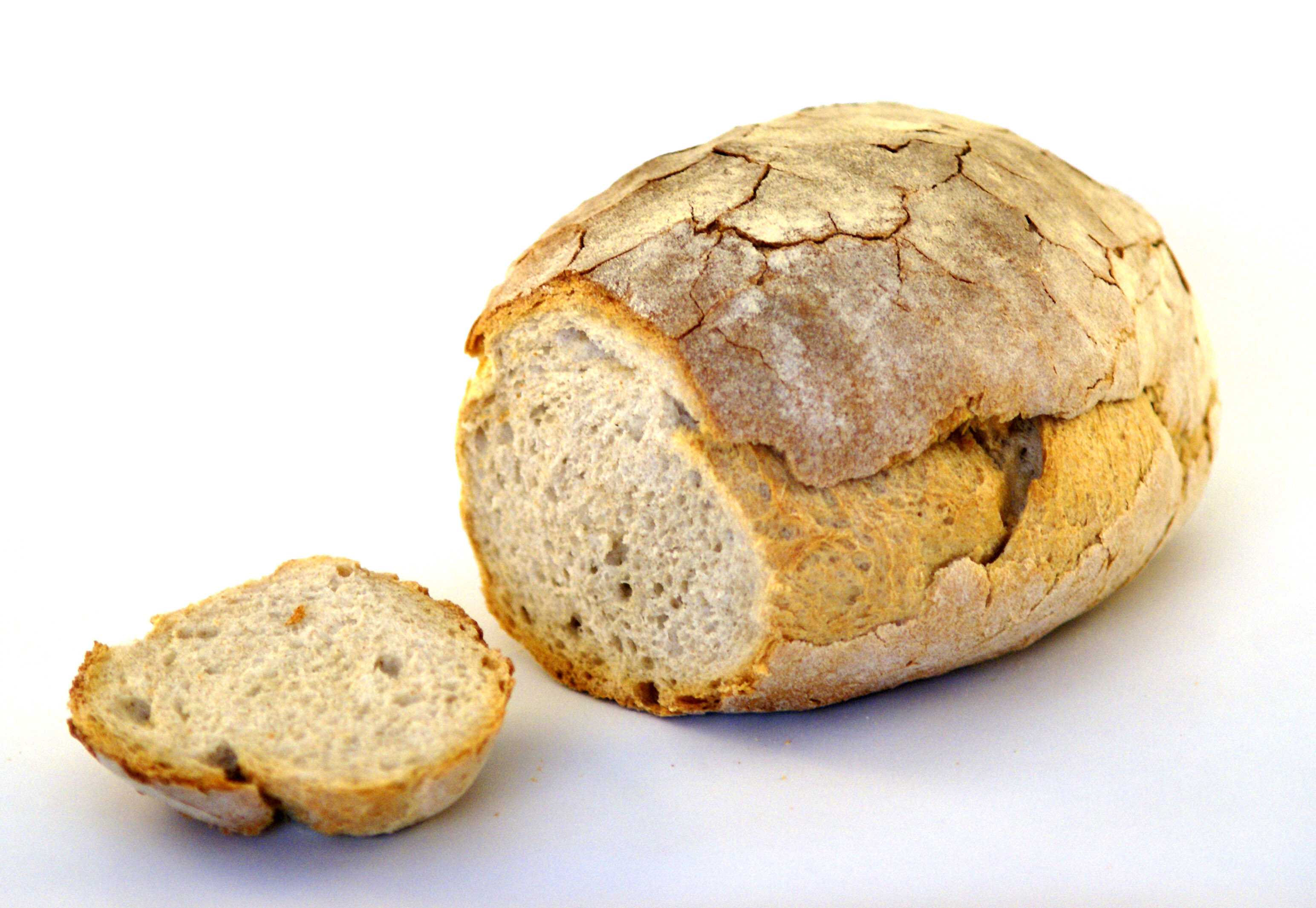
Basler Brot

- Basler Brot (BS/BL)
- Brascidèla (GR)
- Pane ticinese (TI)
- Paun jauer (Münstertaler Brot) (GR)
- Pain de seigle (VS)
- Rua-Brot (FR)
- Spanischbrötli (AG/ZH)
- St. Galler Brot (SG)
- Türggenbrot (SG) Urner Brot (UR)

=== Sweet breads ===
- Bröötis (AI)
- Cuchaule (FR)
- Grittibänz (Bonhomme de Saint Nicolas)

=== Breads with religious significance ===
- Agathabrot (FR)
- Motschellen (AI)
