= Murren =

Murren may refer to:

- Mürren, village in Switzerland
- Zürcher Murren, Swiss bread roll
- James Murren, president of MGM Mirage, Las Vegas
- Heather Murren, member of U.S. Financial Crisis Inquiry Commission
- Murren Karlsson, Swedish footballer
