= Weckmann =

Weckmann is a type of pastry in German-speaking countries.

== People with the surname Weckmann ==
Weckmann is also a German surname that may refer to:

- Matthias Weckmann (c. 1616–1674), German musician and composer
- Niklaus Weckmann (active c. 1481–1526), German sculptor
- Luis Weckmann (1923-1995), Mexican historian and academic.

== See also ==
- Weckman
