= Culture of Switzerland =

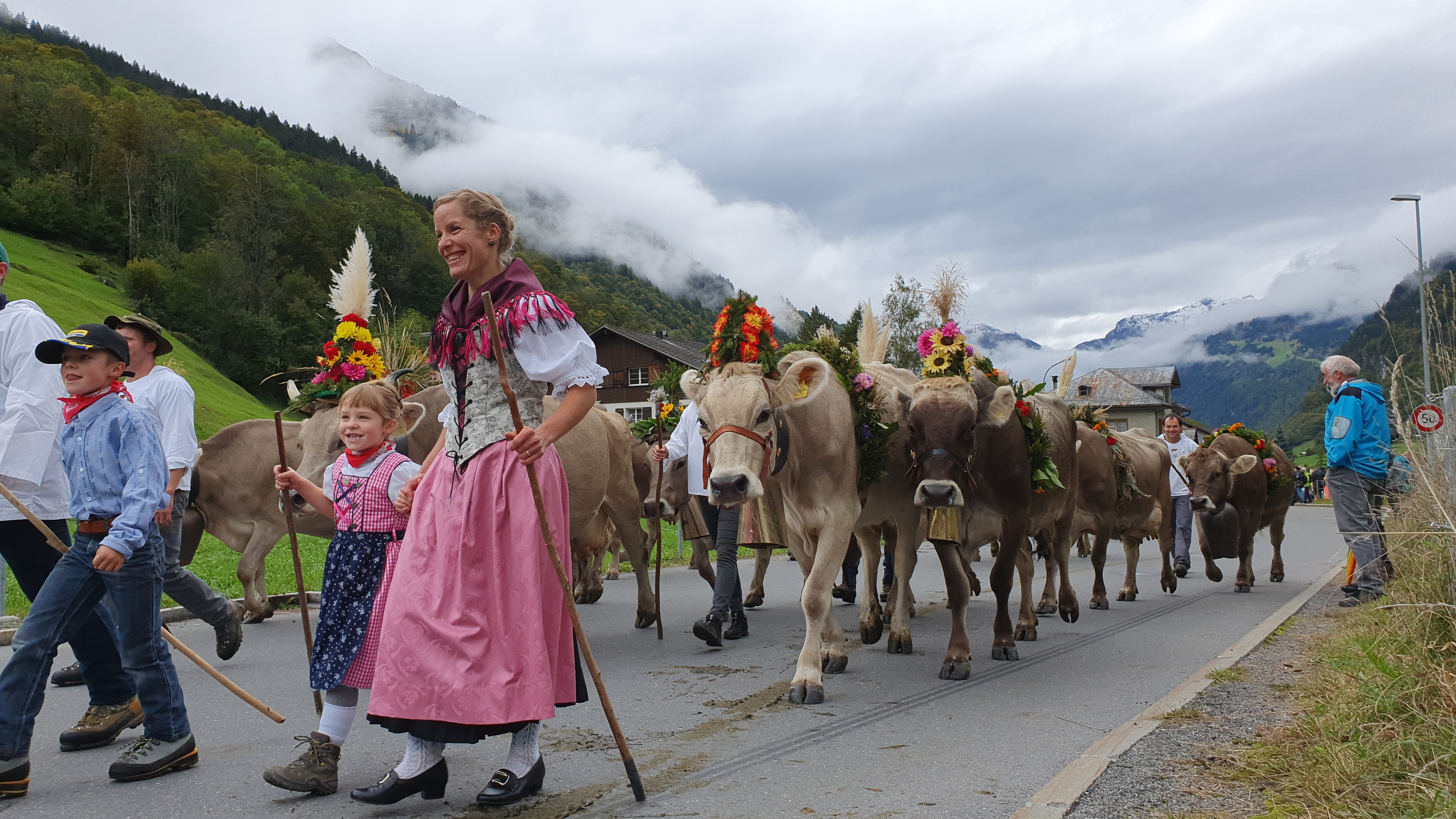
Farmer families, dressed in traditional clothing, guiding cattle down from the Swiss Alps

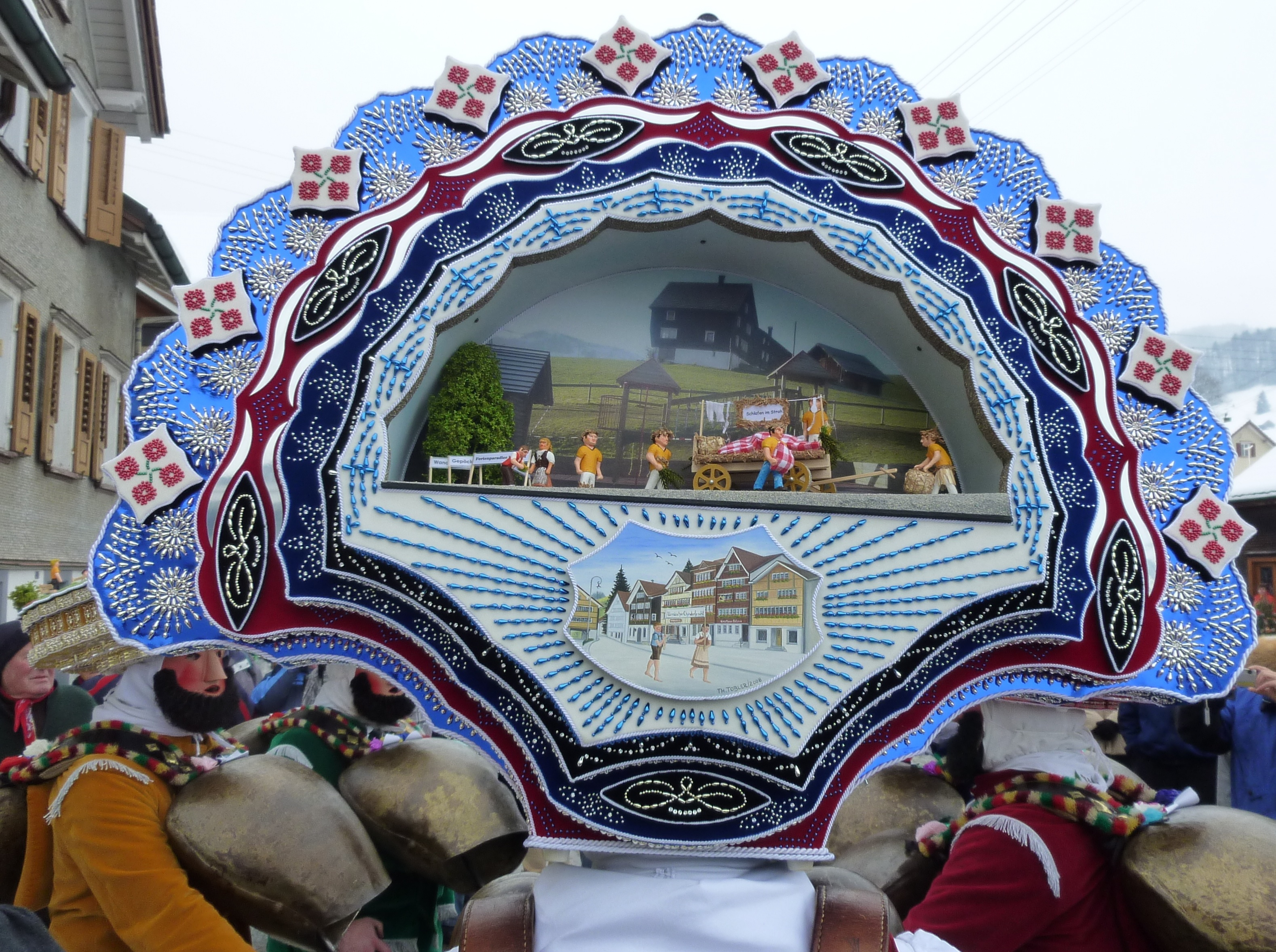
Silvesterklaus in Urnäsch

Switzerland lies at the crossroads of several major European cultures. Three of the continent's major languages, German, French and Italian, are national languages of Switzerland, along with Romansh, spoken by a small minority. Therefore, Swiss culture is characterized by diversity, which is reflected in a wide range of traditional customs. The 26 cantons also account for the large cultural diversity.

Notwithstanding the regional disparities, the Alps have played an essential role in shaping the history and culture of Switzerland. Some scholars, such as Claude Reichler, Kathleen Kete and Joseph Jung, have identified the mid to late 18th century as a period when the Alps changed from being seen by the Swiss themselves as an aesthetically unappealing hazardous barrier to be crossed, to being recognized as a cultural symbol of their nation's beauty. The region of the Gotthard Pass became the nucleus of the Swiss Confederacy in the early 14th century. Nowadays, all mountain areas of Switzerland have a strong skiing and mountaineering culture and are associated with folk arts such as the alphorn and yodeling. Other Swiss cultural icons include Swiss chocolate, Swiss cheese, watches, cowbells, banking, and the Swiss Army knives.

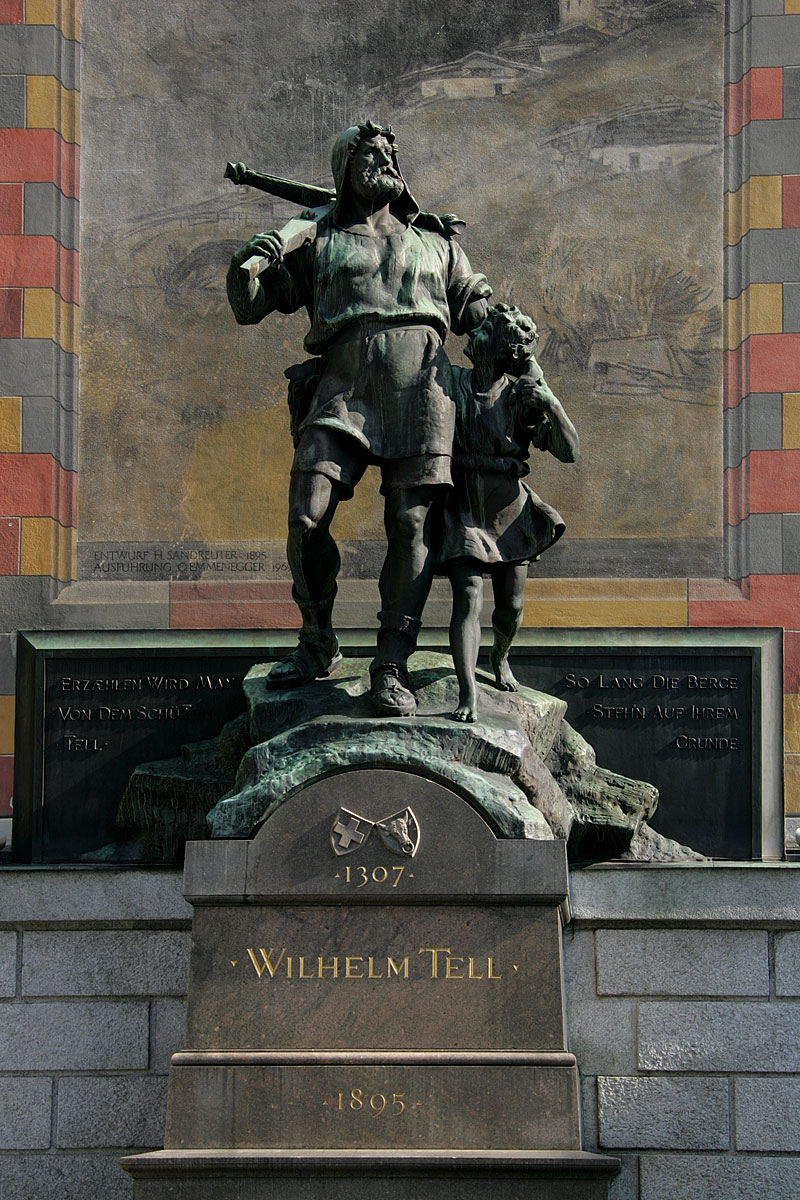
Although there is reasonable doubt whether William Tell ever lived at all, the legend itself had a great impact on the history and culture of Switzerland (statue in Altdorf).

== Folk arts ==
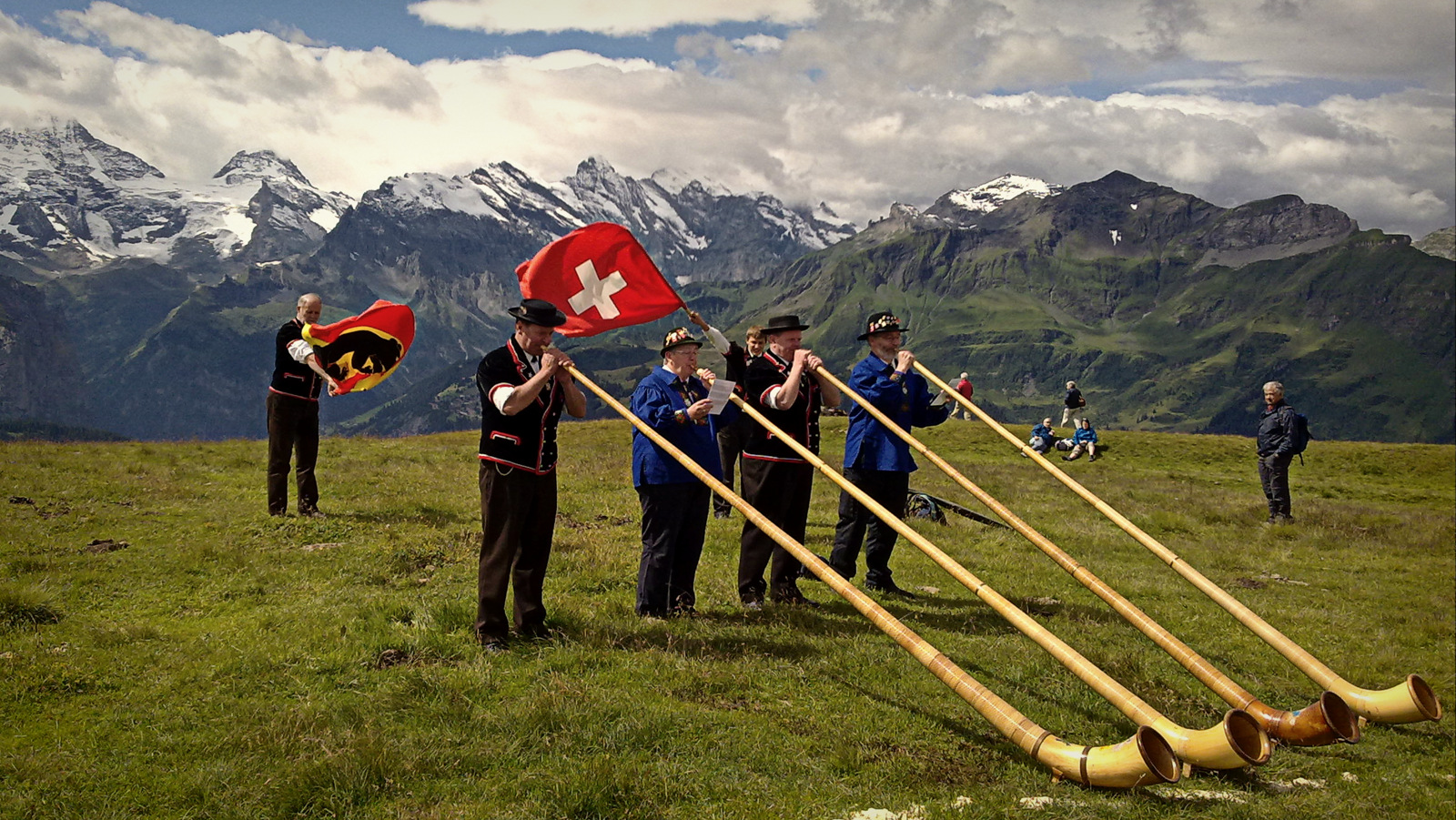
Some of the traditional symbols of Switzerland: the Swiss flag, the alphorn and the snow-capped Alps

Folk art is kept alive in organizations all over the country. In Switzerland, it is mostly expressed in music, dance, poetry, wood carving and embroidery. There are also many regional and local rites demarcating times of the year. Yodeling, despite being stereotypical for Switzerland, is not widespread and is limited to only some mountain areas. The same is true for the accordion, which is sometimes called by the name Schwiizerörgeli, implying that it was a Swiss musical instrument, rather than the German Handorgel.

The alphorn, or the alpenhorn, is a trumpet-like musical instrument made of wood. The use of the alphorn is seen mainly in mountainous regions, can be very popular in some areas, and like yodeling or the accordion, it has become an emblem of traditional Swiss music.

The melodies of folk music vary between regions. Generally those in pastoral areas are floating and wide-ranging. In the inner and southern Alps, however, the melodies are more songlike, and of more limited range. Common and popular themes are about love and the homeland, but patriotic and pastoral themes, as well as hunting themes, are also commonplace.

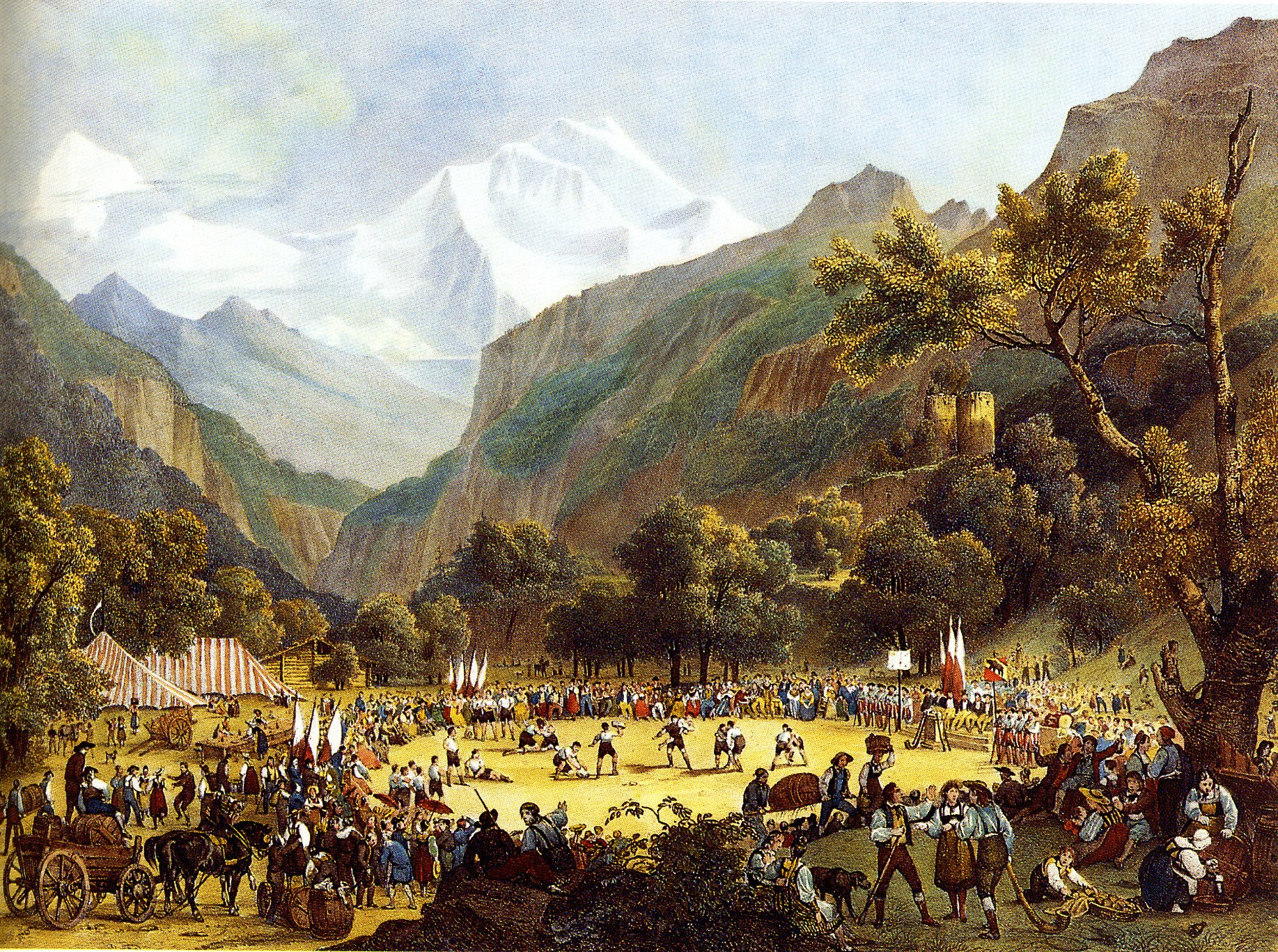
Unspunnenfest in 1808

The Alpine folk culture is characterized by very expressive dances. Small musical ensembles can be found in the more mountainous areas, particularly in the French-speaking part of Switzerland.

The most common form of woodcarving is chip carving. Such carving is normally for the decoration of everyday objects, such as milk stools, neckbands for bells, wooden spoons, or walking sticks. Figure carving is also common, particularly of Nativity figures. In some areas, the façades of houses are richly decorated using woodcarving. This is widespread in the Bernese Oberland region where Protestant Christianity predominates. In Roman Catholic regions, this is far less common.

Embroidery is common on traditional clothing, particularly women's clothing. Embroidery is often limited to prominent points, such as cuffs, hats and scarves. Embroidery is also used for the decoration of fabric. In the past, embroidery was a home industry in the northeast and the east of Switzerland. Nowadays, embroidery is confined to tourism, as traditional clothes are no longer in use.

On certain autumn nights, children's processions with lanterns are common in Alemannic Switzerland. Lanterns (called Rääbeliechtli "turnip light") are hand-carved from root vegetables, generally turnips, by removing the interior and putting a candle inside. The Räbeliechtli is carved with designs such as the traditional sun, moon and stars. The lantern is then suspended by three chains. The children walk through the streets of their town with the lanterns and sing traditional songs. The custom originates with thanksgiving traditions at the end of harvest in November. This tradition is very similar to the tradition of carving turnip lanterns for halloween in Ireland, Scotland, the Isle of Man, and parts of England and Wales. There the celebration is on 31 October to celebrate the eve of the Celtic New Year.

== Architecture ==
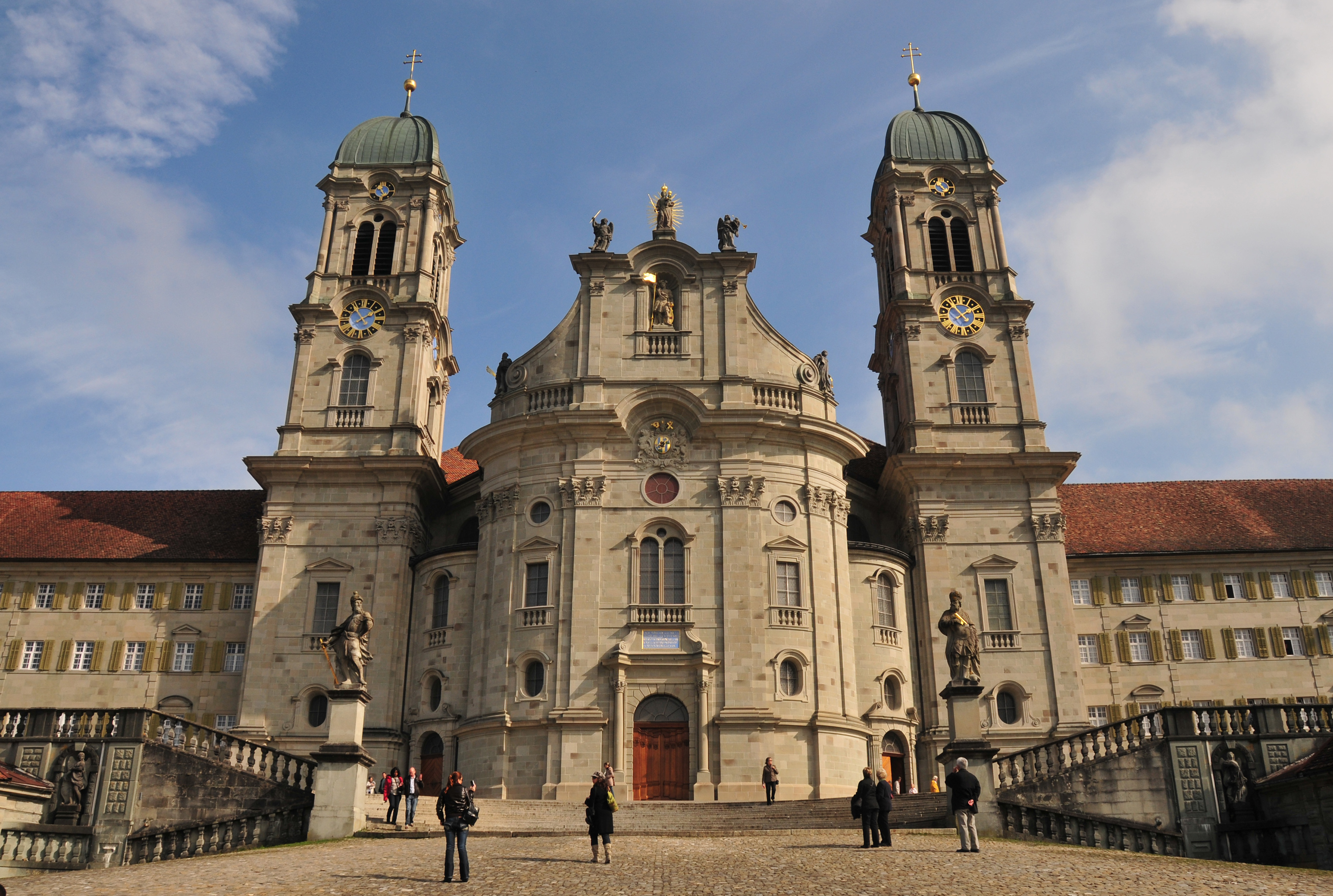
Einsiedeln abbey

There is a strong architectural tradition in Switzerland. The Romanesque style of the 12th century can be found in the cathedrals of Basel, Sion, Chur, Geneva, Zürich and Schaffhausen. This style, which is rich in expression, can also be found on many castles and fortresses around the country, many of which preserved in a good condition. The cathedrals of Lausanne and Bern are in the Gothic style, and the churches of Einsiedeln and St. Gallen are in the Baroque style.

During the Renaissance, a large number of architectural masters gave their talents to Italy. Most of these came from the southern canton of Ticino. The Prisons near the Doge's Palace in Venice and the Rialto Bridge in Venice were built by Antonio da Ponte. The Bridge of Sighs in Venice was built by Antonio Contino, and Domenico Fontana (1543–1607) designed the entire Lateran Palace in Naples as well as the façade of the St. John Lateran Church and the Royal Palace in the same city. Fontana's nephew Carlo Maderno was an architect to Pope Paul V. San Carlo alle Quattro Fontane, the gallery of the Palazzo Spada and the Filippini monastery were built by Francesco Borromini, and Carlo Fontana was responsible for the façade of San Marcello al Corso and the Montecitorio Palace; Baldassare Longhena, from Maroggia, built the church of Santa Maria della Salute, the Rezzonico and the Widmann palaces; all in Venice.

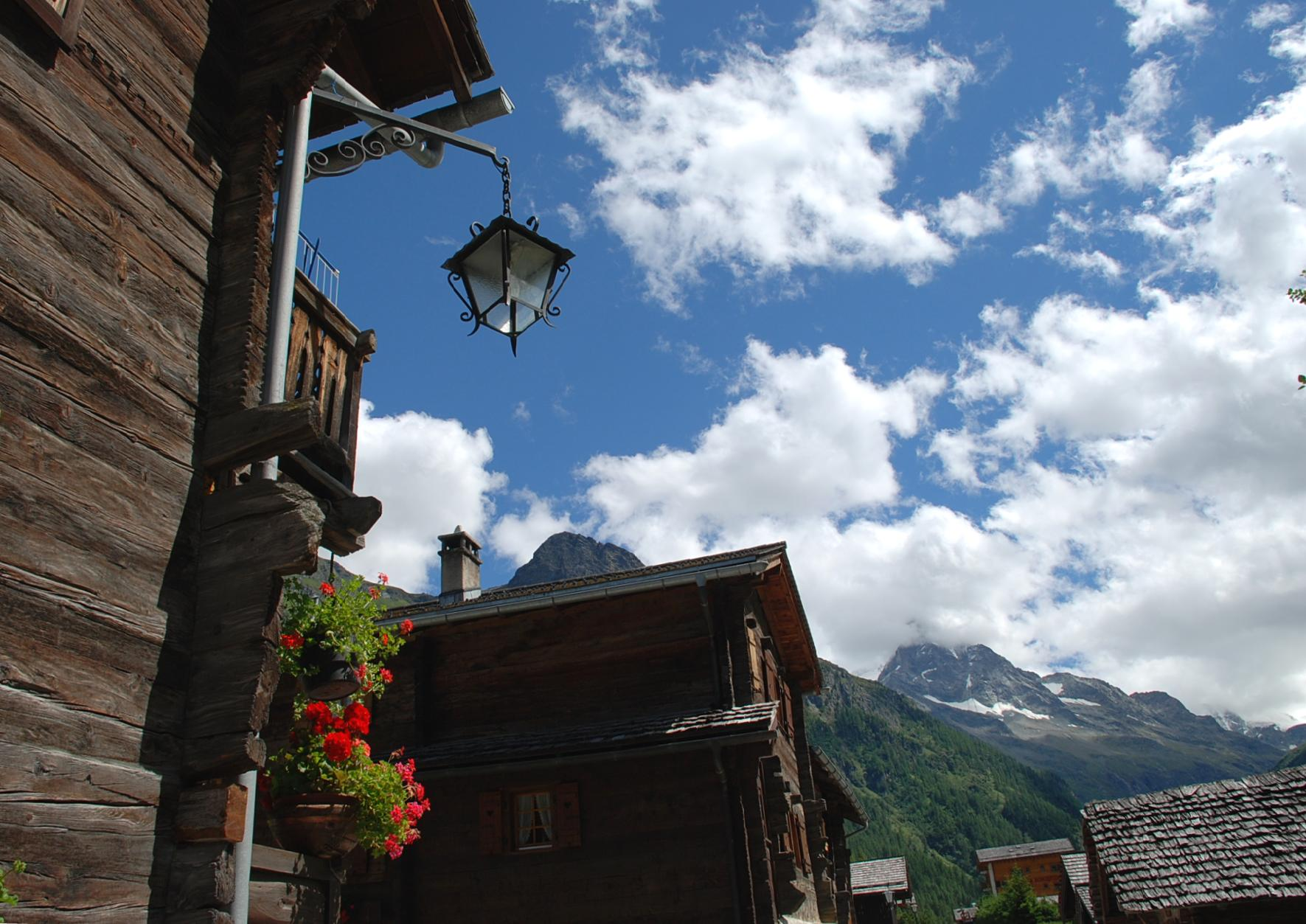
Old wooden houses in Zinal

Gilardi and Oldelli families from Ticino set up architecture practices in Russia. Giovanni Giliardi built The Orphanage in Moscow, and his son Domenico Giliardi was in charge of the rebuilding Moscow public buildings, including the University, after the Great Fire of 1812. Domenico Trezzini built many places in St. Petersburg by the orders of Peter the Great; Pietro Trezzini (not related to Domenico) continued the tradition in the 1740s.

Early in the 20th century, a new movement, called the Style Sapin, was created by the architect and painter Charles l'Eplattenier in the city of La Chaux-de-Fonds. It was a variation of Art Nouveau, and it became popularly known as the Style Sapin, or pine tree style, since l'Eplatennier insisted that the best model for art and architecture in the region was the pine tree, along with the other native plants and trees of the Jura mountains. Le Corbusier (Charles-Edouard Jeanneret), was a student of l'Eplattenier, and at the age of eighteen built his first house, a chalet with a pine tree decorative design, in La Chaux-de-Fonds. He became a major force in western modern architecture in the 20th century.

Distinctive architecture of high quality can be found around Switzerland. It is often considered as particularly innovative modern architecture. Mario Botta is a famous architect who influenced modern architecture. The architects Jacques Herzog and Pierre de Meuron from Basel received the Pritzker Architecture Prize in 2001, in 2009 the prize was awarded to Swiss architect Peter Zumthor, and in 2021, Anne Lacaton a Professor at ETH Zurich, won the prize with her partner Jean-Philippe Vassal.

== Visual arts ==
In the 16th century Protestantism had a strong influence on visual arts in Switzerland. Samuel Hieronymus Grimm was a well-known 18th-century watercolourist and ink wash artist, although he created much of his notable work while in England. There was almost no influence from Italian or French Renaissance. Chiefly in modern times did Swiss artists begin to emerge internationally. Alberto Giacometti is said to have derived much of his inspiration from the Etruscans, but became internationally known. Jean Tinguely fascinated people from all over the world with complex moving sculptures constructed entirely from scrap materials. Paul Klee is sometimes regarded as Switzerland's most original and impressive painter.

The Dada movement originated in the Cabaret Voltaire in Zürich in 1916.

Despite the relatively small number of internationally famous artists such as Alberto Giacometti and HR Giger, there are considerable art collections in renowned museums around Switzerland. These are not only found in the cities of Zürich, Basel and Geneva but also in smaller towns such as Schaffhausen, Martigny and Winterthur. The museums in the smaller towns pride themselves for their contribution to the arts, which exceed what is commonly found in provincial areas.

Graphic arts flourish in Switzerland, as does creative photography. Examples of this can be found on calendars, magazines and outdoor billboard advertisements.

== Literature ==
In the field of literature Switzerland produced a number of very well known writers. Jean-Jacques Rousseau was from Geneva. The critic and historian Jacob Burckhardt was from Basel. The house of Germaine de Staël in Coppet was a centre of European literary life during the 18th century. Other writers include Gottfried Keller, Conrad Ferdinand Meyer, Jeremias Gotthelf and Charles Ferdinand Ramuz. Hermann Hesse and Carl Spitteler both won a Nobel Prize for their works.

In the 20th century the plays of Friedrich Dürrenmatt and Max Frisch impressed readers beyond the borders of Switzerland. There are a great number of regional dialects, especially in the German language. Even though standard German is commonly used for writing, there is a living dialect literature in many areas.

For children's culture there is the cartoon character Globi.

== Music ==
Switzerland is not commonly considered a leading musical nation. However, in the 20th century it produced a number of notable composers, such as Arthur Honegger, Othmar Schoeck and Frank Martin, who have all gained international renown. Lucerne and Verbier both feature prestigious international classical music festivals in the summer: the Lucerne Festival and the Verbier Festival. Other places have similar festivals, ranging from country and western to pop and jazz. The Montreux Jazz Festival is particularly well known.

Swiss composer and musician Andreas Vollenweider gained worldwide recognition with his harp music and has received a Grammy Award, followed by two Grammy nominations, one as recent as 2007. His 17 instrumental albums have sold over 15 million copies.

== Media ==
Newspapers are renowned for their thorough coverage of international issues, such as the Neue Zürcher Zeitung of Zürich and Le Temps of Geneva. As elsewhere, television plays a great role in modern cultural life in Switzerland. The national public broadcaster, SRG SSR idée suisse, offers three networks, one each for the German, French and Italian-speaking parts of Switzerland. In the German-speaking part, television from Germany is popular, as is television from France in the French-speaking part and television from Italy in the Italian-speaking part. American movies and television series are influential in all areas.

In film, American productions constitute most of the programme, although several Swiss movies have enjoyed commercial successes in recent years. Maybe due to the multilingual culture, almost all movie theatres play movies in their original language with subtitles, and films on television are often broadcast in original and synchronized versions.

== Banking ==
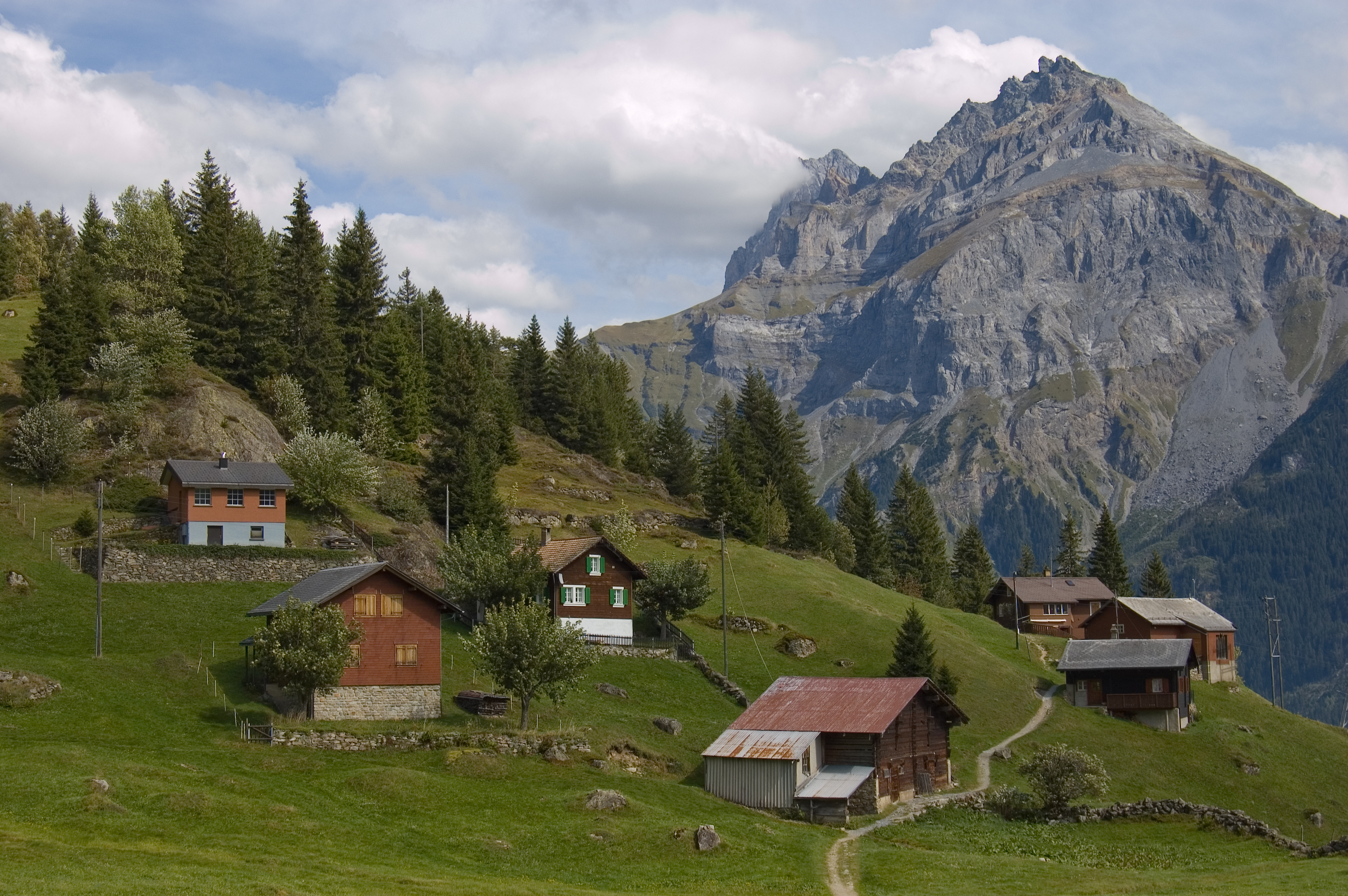
Switzerland's mountainous terrain helps to store gold in underground bunkers.

Switzerland has been associated with banking and other related banking services. Since the early 18th century, Switzerland has a long, kindred history of banking secrecy and client confidentiality. Started as a way to protect wealthy European banking interests, Swiss banking secrecy was codified with the 1934 Federal Act on Banks and Savings Banks. Considered the "grandfather of bank secrecy", has been one of the largest offshore financial centers and tax havens in the world since the mid-20th century. Following an international push to roll back banking secrecy laws, Switzerland has seen fluctuating levels of banking regulation.

Releasing client information has been considered a serious social and criminal offence since the early 1900s. Employees working in Switzerland and abroad at Swiss banks "have long adhered to an unwritten code similar to that observed by doctors or priests". Banking in Switzerland has historically played, and still continues to play, a dominant role in the Swiss economy and society. According to the Organisation for Economic Co-operation and Development (OECD), in 2015, total banking assets amount to 467% of total gross domestic product. Banking in Switzerland has been portrayed, to varying degrees of accuracy, in overall popular culture, books, movies, and television shows.

== Science ==
There has been a long tradition of Swiss scientists ever since Paracelsus (real name Theophrastus Bombastus von Hohenheim) in the 16th century. Paracelsus introduced the field of chemistry into medicine in the 16th century. The Bernoulli family from Basel is known for their significant contributions to mathematics over a time span of three generations. Leonhard Euler is another innovative mathematician. Horace-Bénédict de Saussure was a naturalist and pioneer in Alpine studies. The Federal Institute of Technology in Zürich has produced a great number of Nobel Prize winners, while the European Organization for Nuclear Research, known as CERN, operates the largest particle physics laboratory in the world. Ferdinand de Saussure was an important contributor to the field of linguistics. Physicist Albert Einstein, born in Germany, moved to Switzerland in 1895 at the age of 16 and became a Swiss citizen in 1901. It was during his time in Switzerland that he wrote the famous “Annus Mirabilis” papers in 1905, which transformed physics forever.

== Leisure ==
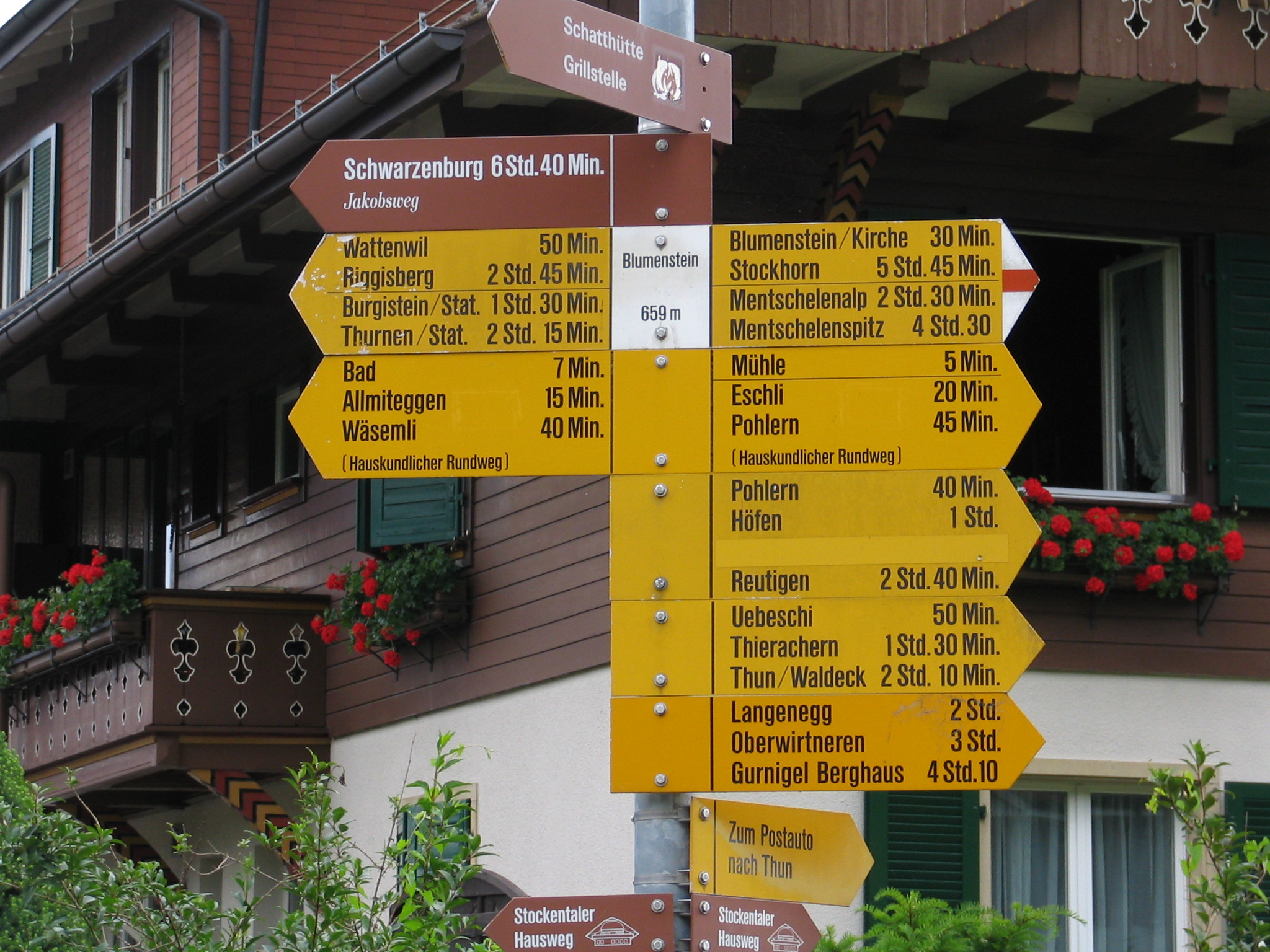
Common hiking signs

The close proximity to the mountains in all areas in Switzerland has greatly influenced the leisure of Swiss people. The growth of ski and mountaineering resorts in the Swiss mountains have caused the Swiss to become very sports conscious. Apart from skiing and mountaineering, Swiss-style wrestling (Schwingen) is still popular in rural areas. Sunday-morning shooting sessions and Hornussen (a kind of Alpine baseball) are two other traditional Swiss sports. Shooting, tennis, golf, ice hockey, football (soccer), basketball, handball, gliding, paragliding, sailing, swimming, volleyball, floorball, mountain biking, and hiking in the forests and mountains are all popular pastimes. Fishing is commonplace in the many lakes and rivers, but often a licence is necessary. Many mountain lakes freeze over during winter and are used for curling, horse and dog racing, particularly around St. Moritz.

Lausanne is headquarters for many international sport organisations, notably the International Olympic Committee, the Court of Arbitration for Sport and some 55 international sport associations. FIFA is headquartered in Zürich.

== Cultural World Heritage Sites ==
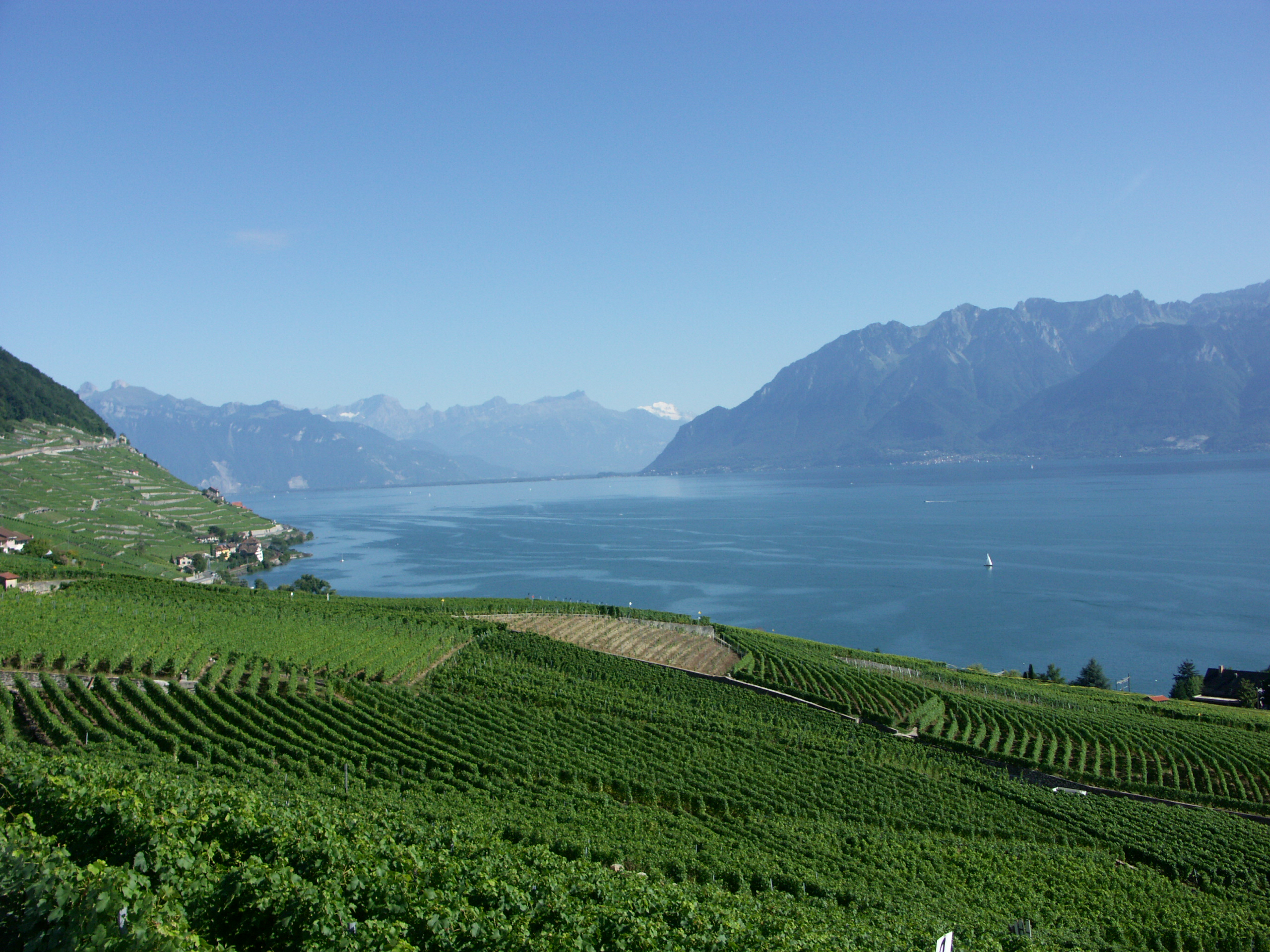
Lavaux vineyards

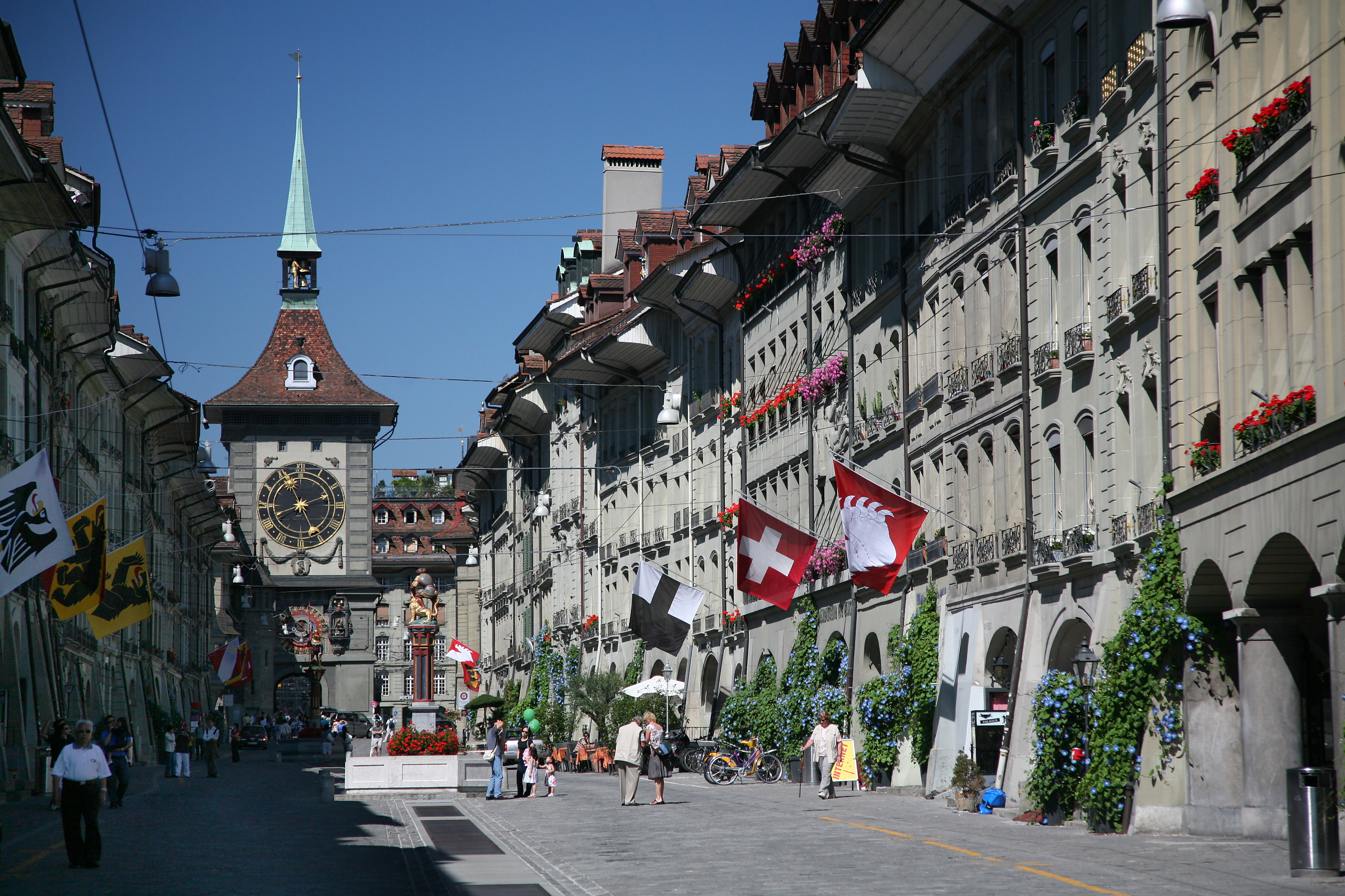
Old City of Bern

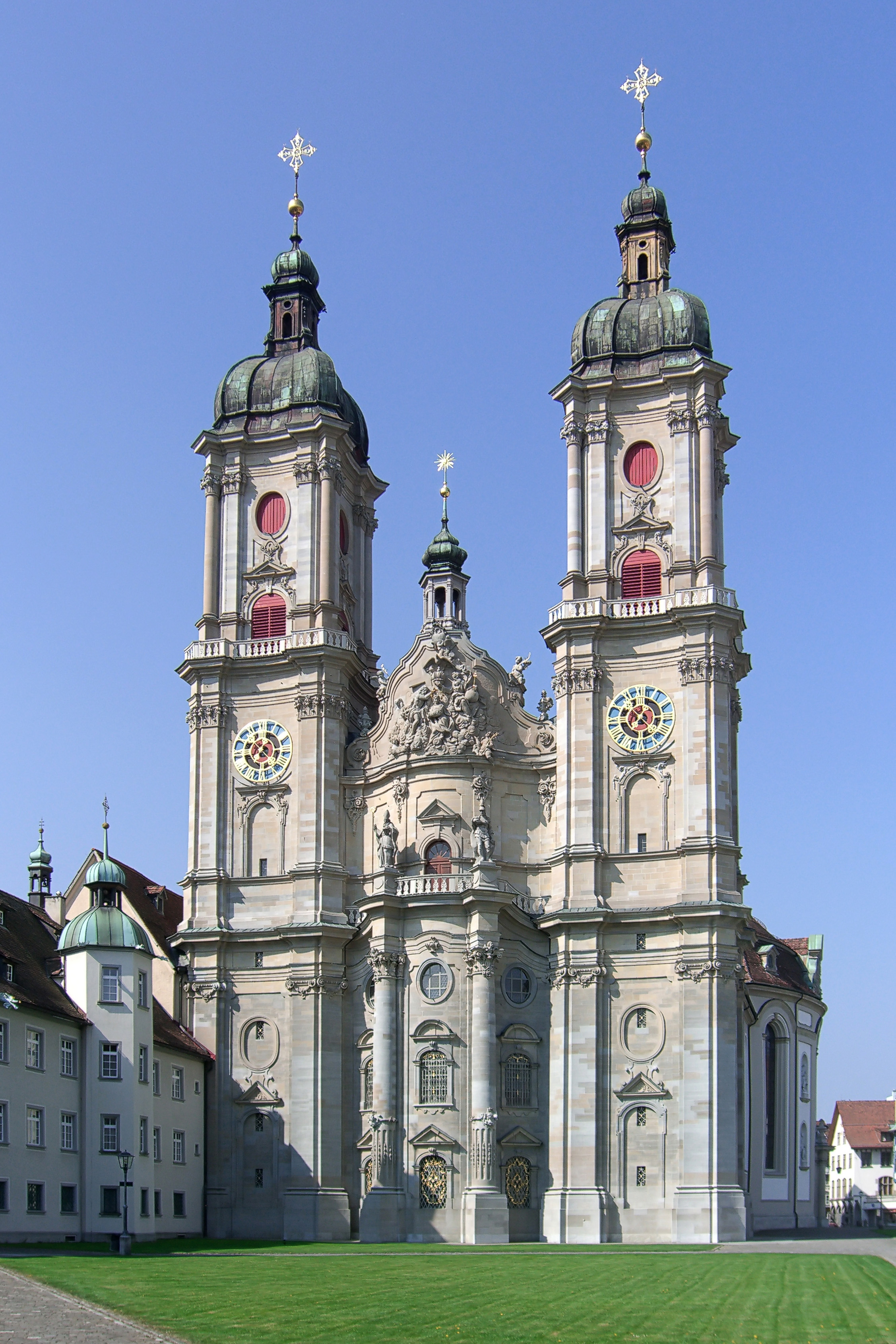
Abbey of Saint Gall

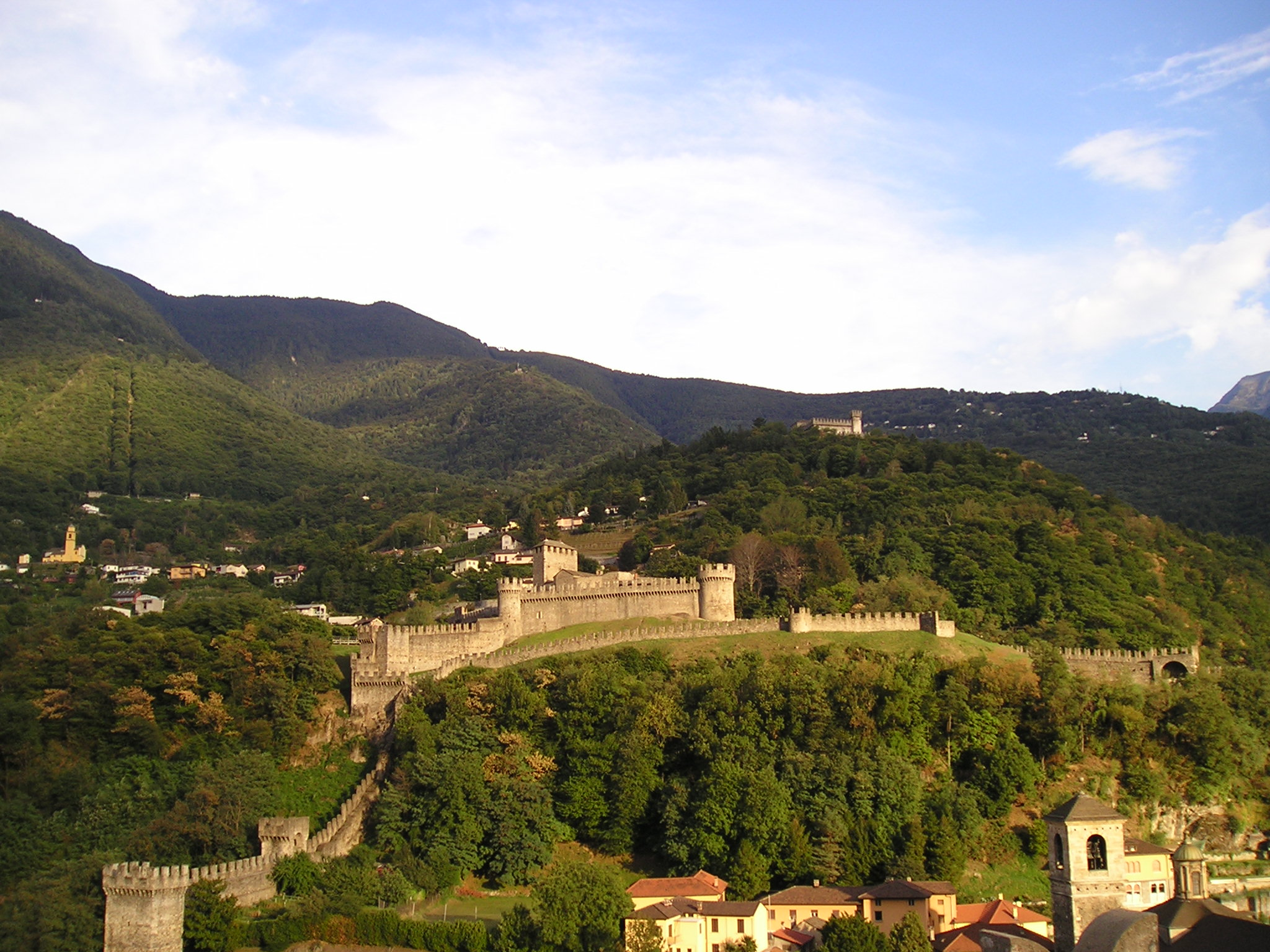
Three Castles of Bellinzona

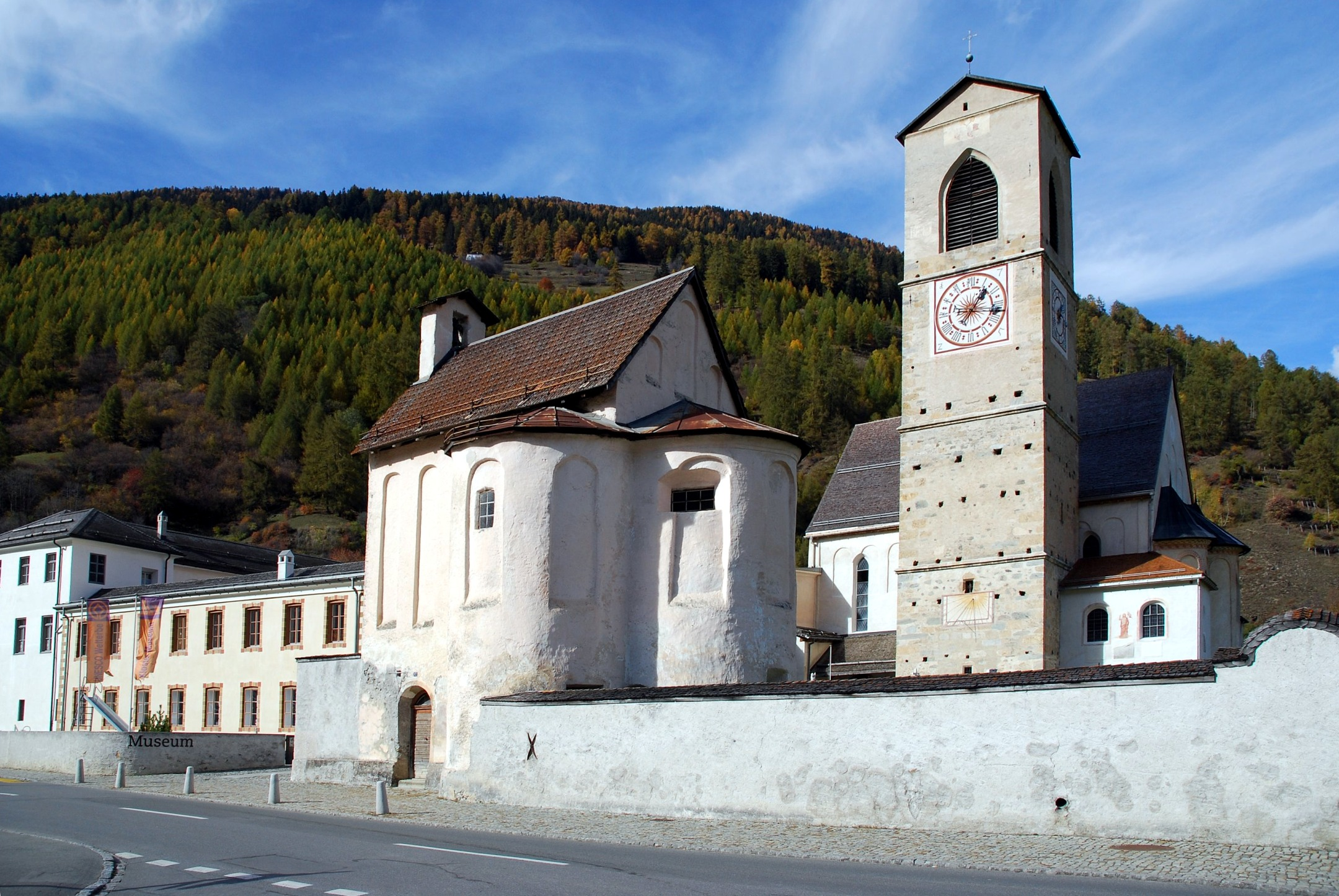
Benedictine Convent of Saint John

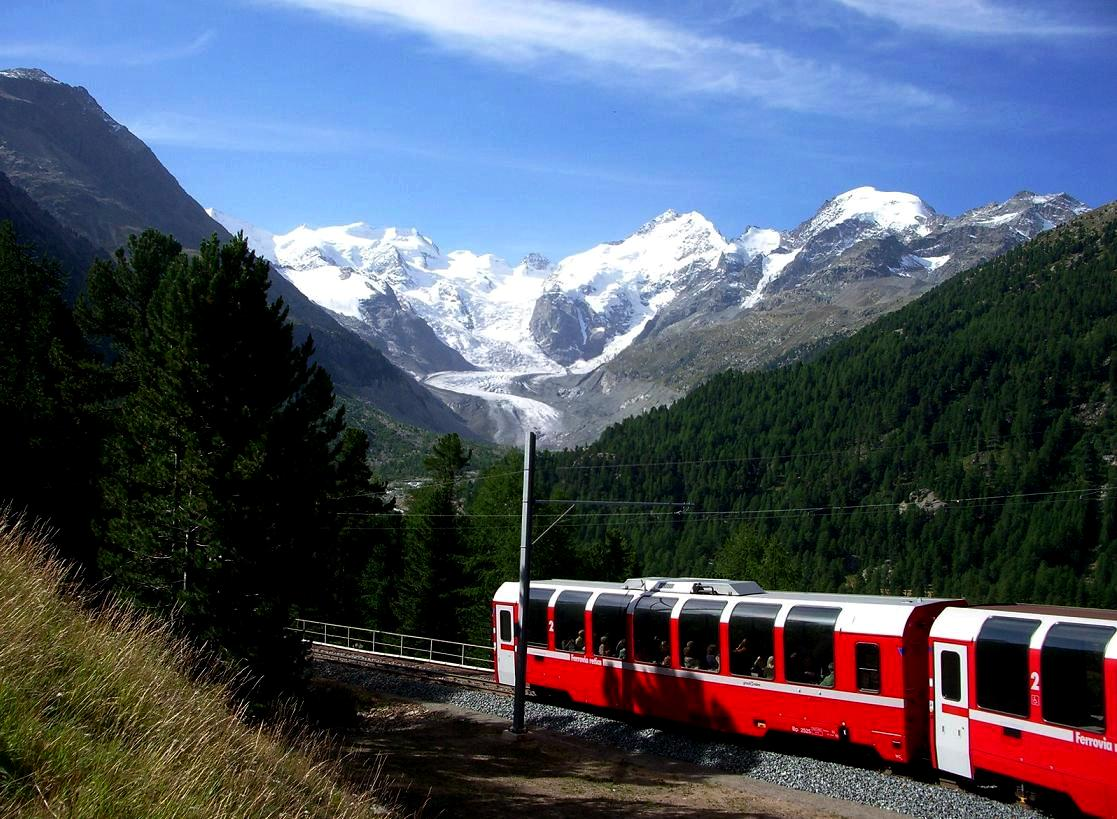
Rhaetian Railway

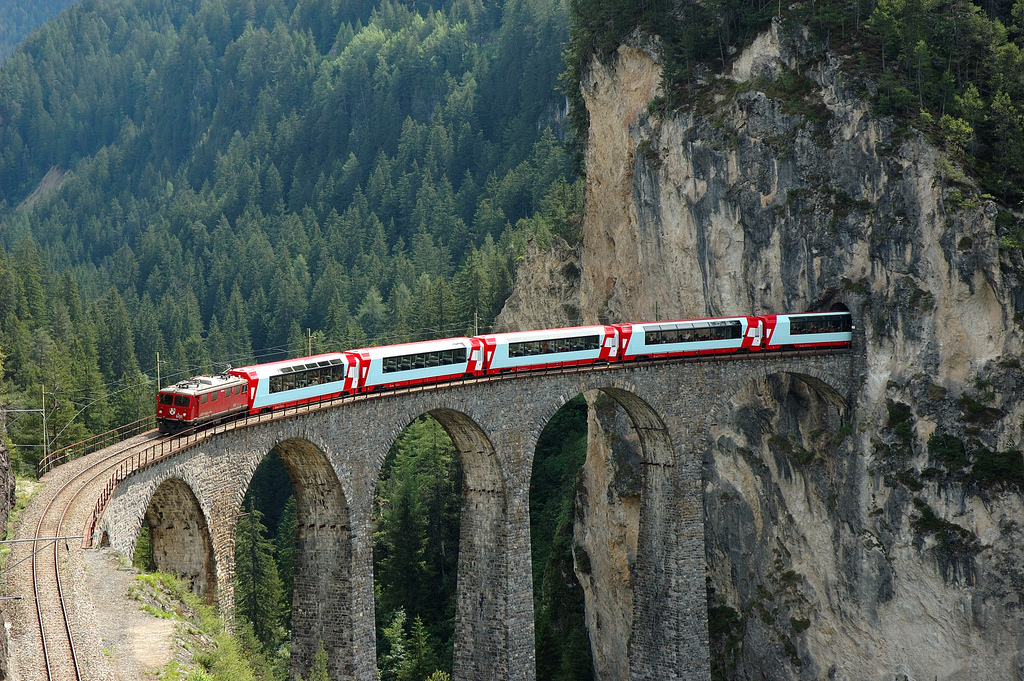
Landwasserviadukt

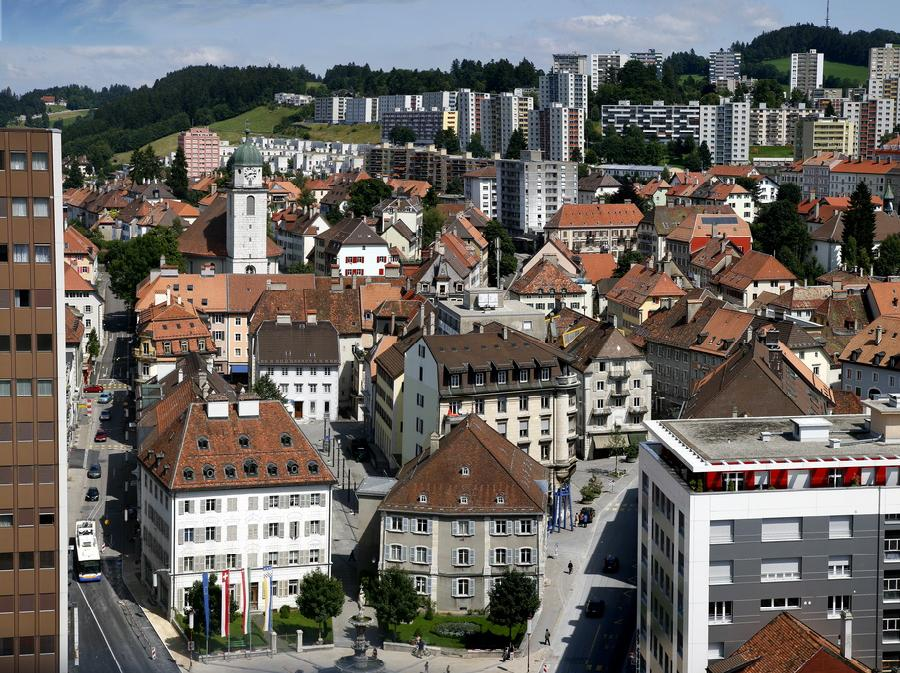
La Chaux-de-Fonds and Le Locle

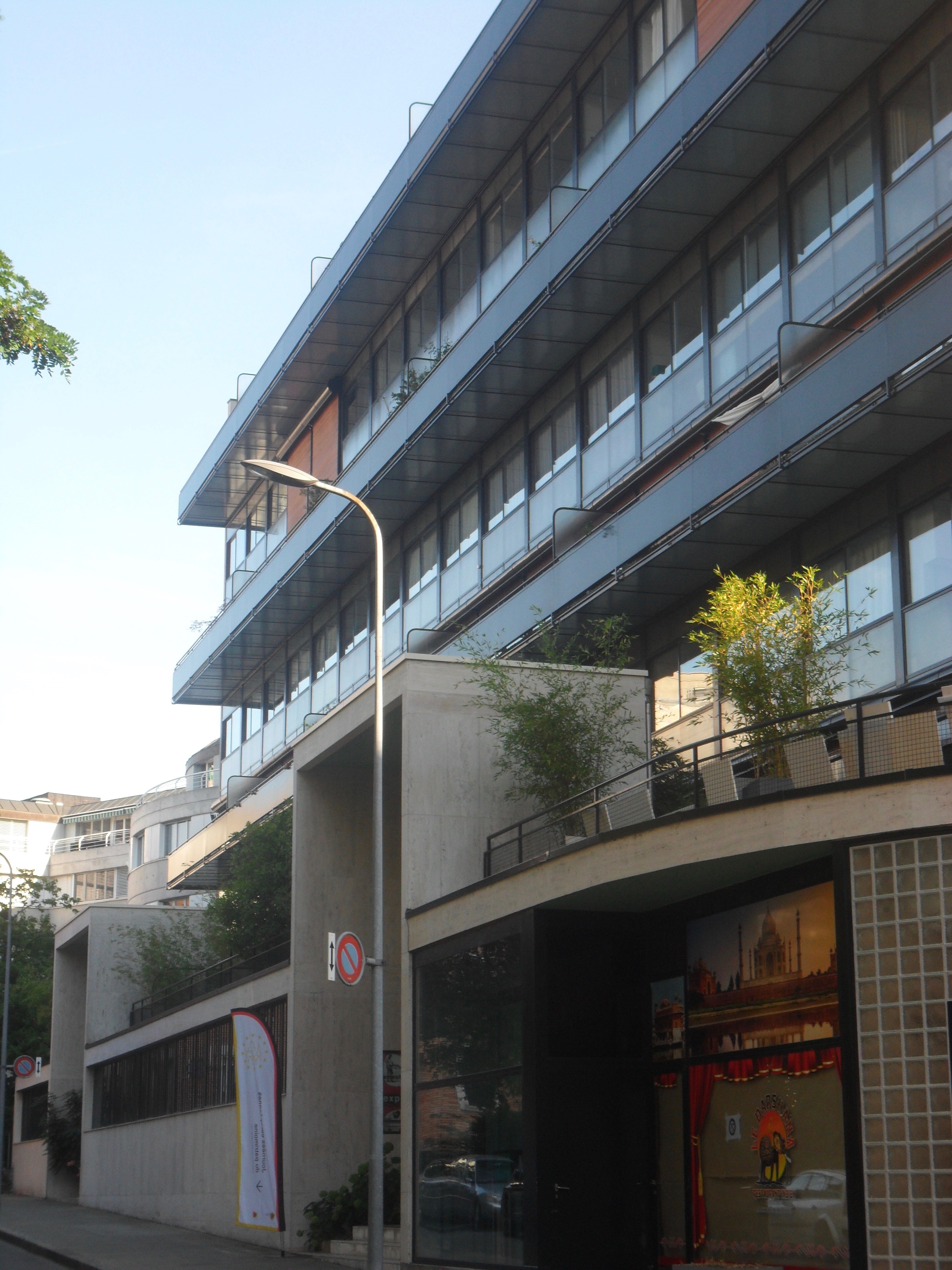
Immeuble Clarté by Le Corbusier in Geneva

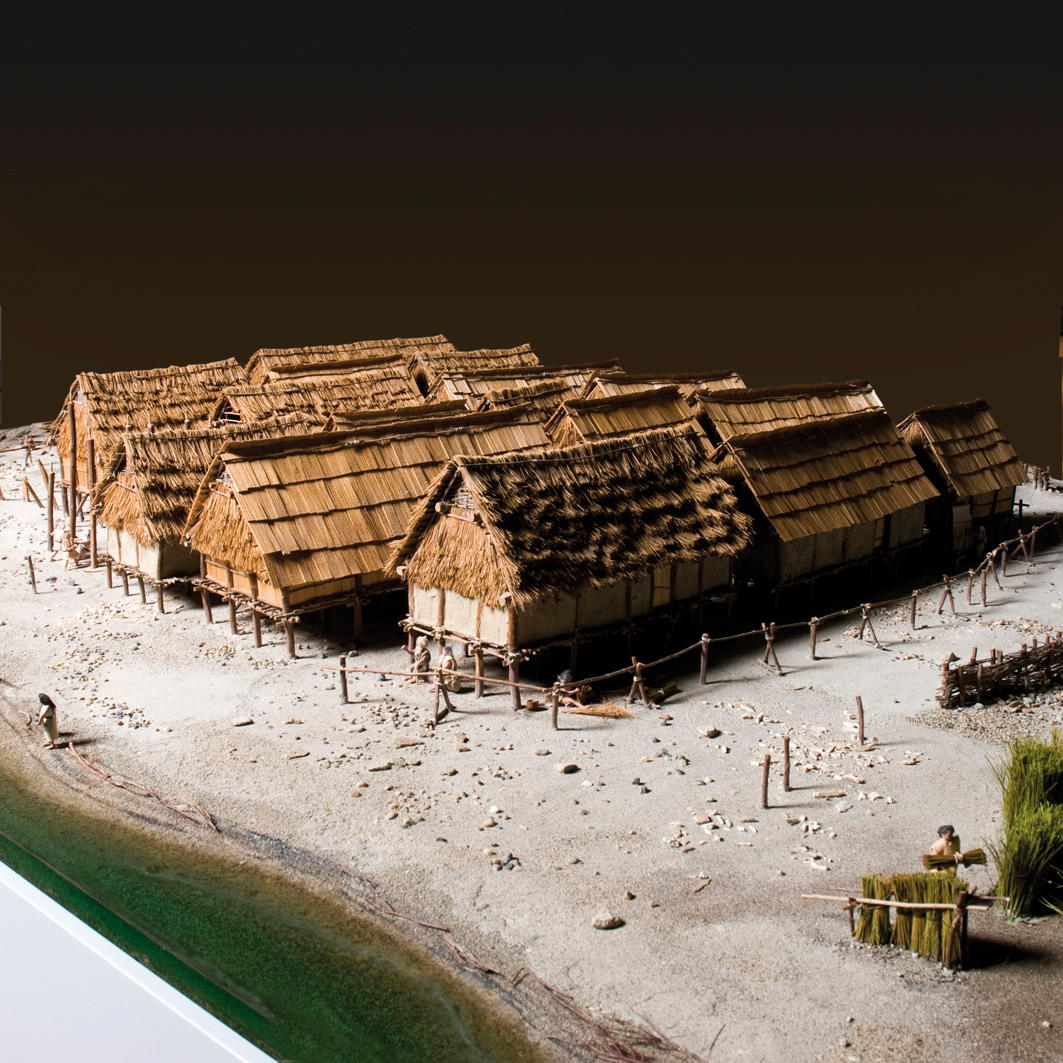
56 of the 111 Prehistoric Pile dwellings around the Alps

== See also ==
- Pre-Christian Alpine traditions
- Swiss people
- Swiss Alps
- Agriculture in Switzerland
- Swiss cuisine
