= Brot =

Brot may refer to:

- the German word for bread
  - German bread
  - List of Swiss breads
  - Bernd das Brot, "Berndt the Bread", a puppet character on the German children's television channel KI.KA
  - Das Brot, a short story by Wolfgang Borchert
- Brot (TV series), Icelandic 2019 TV series
- Brot., abbreviation in botanical name citations for Portuguese botanist Félix de Avelar Brotero

== Surname ==
- Alphonse Brot (1807–1895), French author and playwright
- Auguste Louis Brot (1821-1896), malacologist from Switzerland
- Tzvika Brot, mayor of Bat Yam, Israel
