= Weckman =

Weckman is a Finnish surname. Notable people with the surname include:

- Jouni Weckman, Finnish curler
- Verner Weckman (1882–1968), Finnish wrestler
- Mary Ann Scherr (née Mary Ann Weckman; 1921–2016), American designer and educator

== See also ==
- Weckmann
