= Basler Brot =

Swiss bread

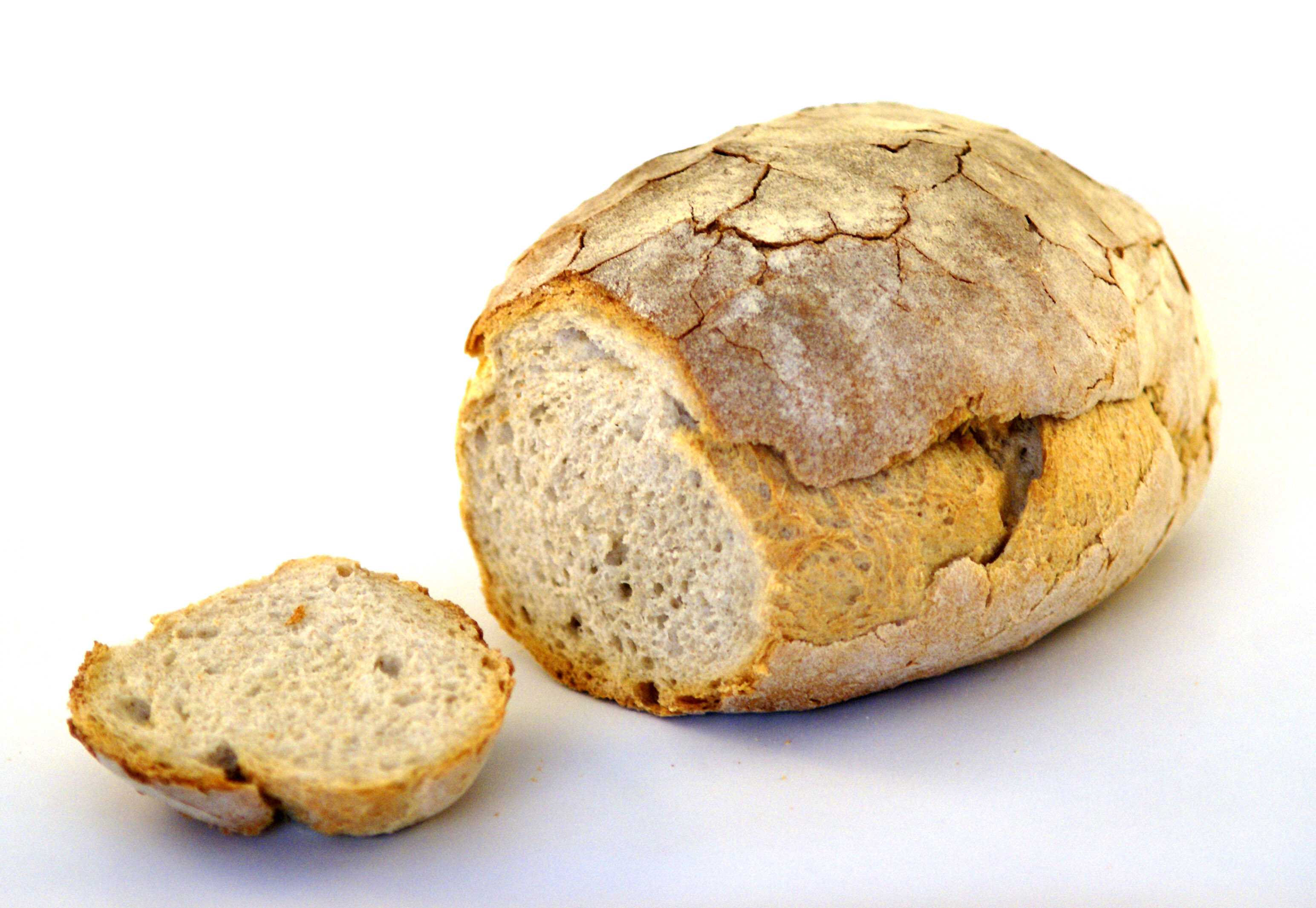
- Type: Bread
- Place of origin: Switzerland
- Region or state: Basel-Stadt and Basel-Landschaft
- Main ingredients: Pre-ferment, flour, salt, yeast, water

Basler Brot (German pronunciation: [ˈbaːzlɐ bʁoːt], Bread of Basel), in Basel also Basler Laibli, is a bread traditionally made in the Swiss cantons of Basel-Stadt and Basel-Landschaft, but now popular in all of Switzerland. It is distinguished from other Swiss breads by a very soft, porous dough and a mealy, crunchy crust.

The age of the recipe is uncertain. The Basler Brot was first described in a bakers' journal in 1944. After a marketing campaign by the Swiss Bakers Association in the 1950s, it was made available in all Swiss bakeries.

== Production ==
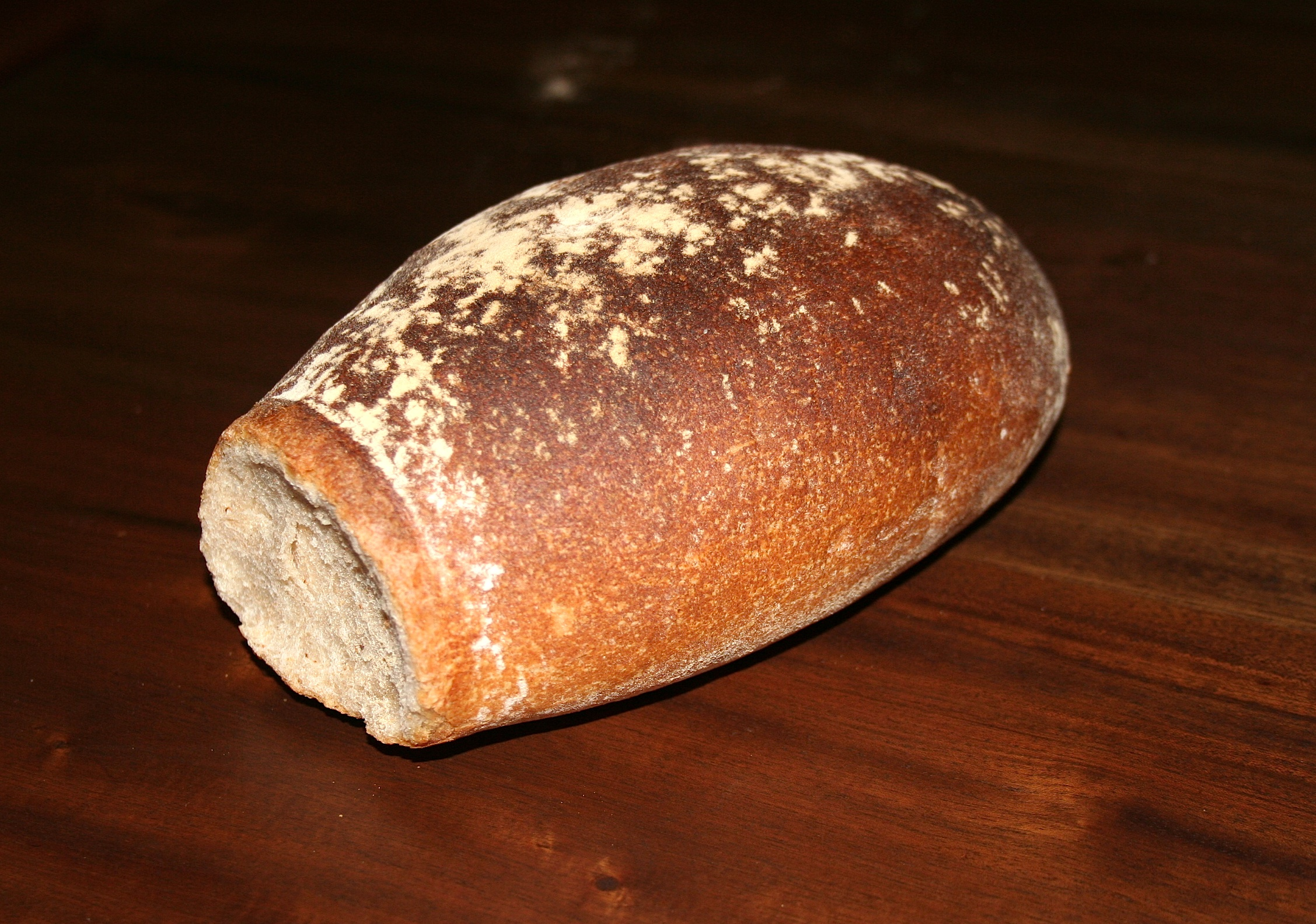
A traditionally made Basler Brot without cracks in the crust.

Production of the Basler Brot begins the day before baking with the production of the Hebel, a mother dough that is left to ripen overnight, producing the bread's characteristic aroma. It is then mixed with plain flour, salt, yeast and water to produce a dough with a very high hydration (over 80%), making the bread very soft.

After a light kneading, the dough is formed into rough pieces, which are weighed and laid on flour-dusted wooden boards for half an hour. They are only lightly rolled into an oval shape, which allows for the dough's large pores to form, and then baked for at least half an hour at up to 330 °C (626 °F) Usually, two loaves are baked attached point to point, and steam is used to prevent a premature hardening of the crust, which should – unlike the loaf pictured above – not crack during baking.

== Significance ==
Distributed nationally through the retailers Migros and Coop, Basler Brot is eaten in all of Switzerland as an everyday food. It is also sold in the area near Basel in Alsace (France) and Lörrach (Germany)

== Bibliography ==
- Koellreuter, Isabel und Nathalie Unternährer, Brot und Stadt. Bäckerhandwerk und Brotkonsum in Basel vom Mittelalter bis zur Gegenwart, Schwabe AG, Basel, 2006.
- Müller, Gustav, Das Brot im Baselbieter Volksleben, Schweizerische Gesellschaft für Volkskunde, Basel, 1939.
- Kantonsbrote, Fachschule Richemont Luzern, Luzern, 1985.
- Meier, Eugen A., Das süsse Basel, Buchverlag Basler Zeitung, Basel, 1996.

== See also ==
- Culinary Heritage of Switzerland
