= Räbeliechtli =

Traditional lamp carved out of a turnip

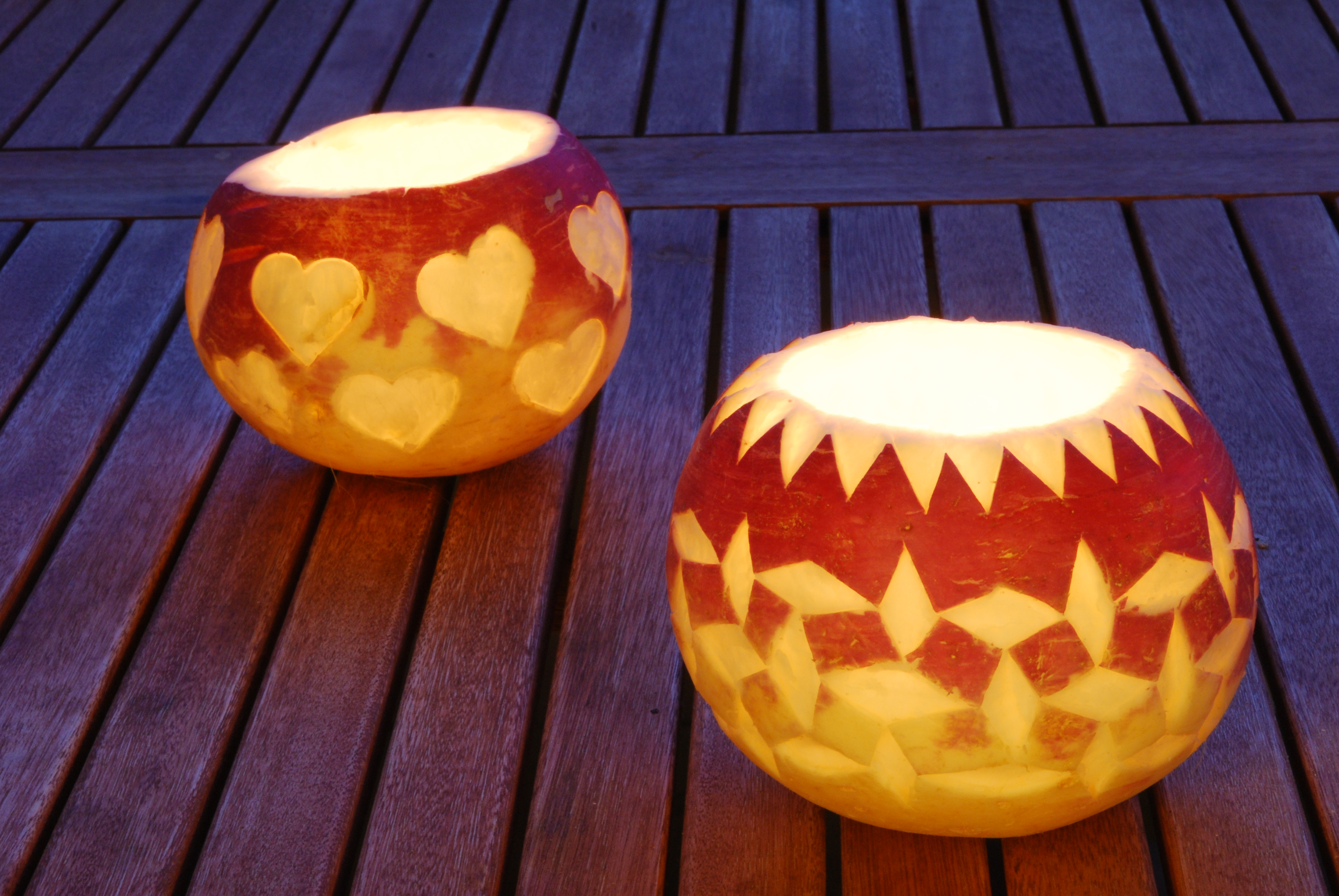
Räbeliechtli lanterns

The Räbeliechtli (Swiss German for "turnip lantern") is a traditional lantern made from autumn turnips (known as Räben in Swiss German). It originates from the Alemannic German-speaking regions, especially in Switzerland. In the Middle Ages, turnips were a staple food, playing a role similar to that of the modern-day potato. Children in various Swiss cantons carve these lanterns to mark the harvesting of the last crops in November.

== Origins and construction ==
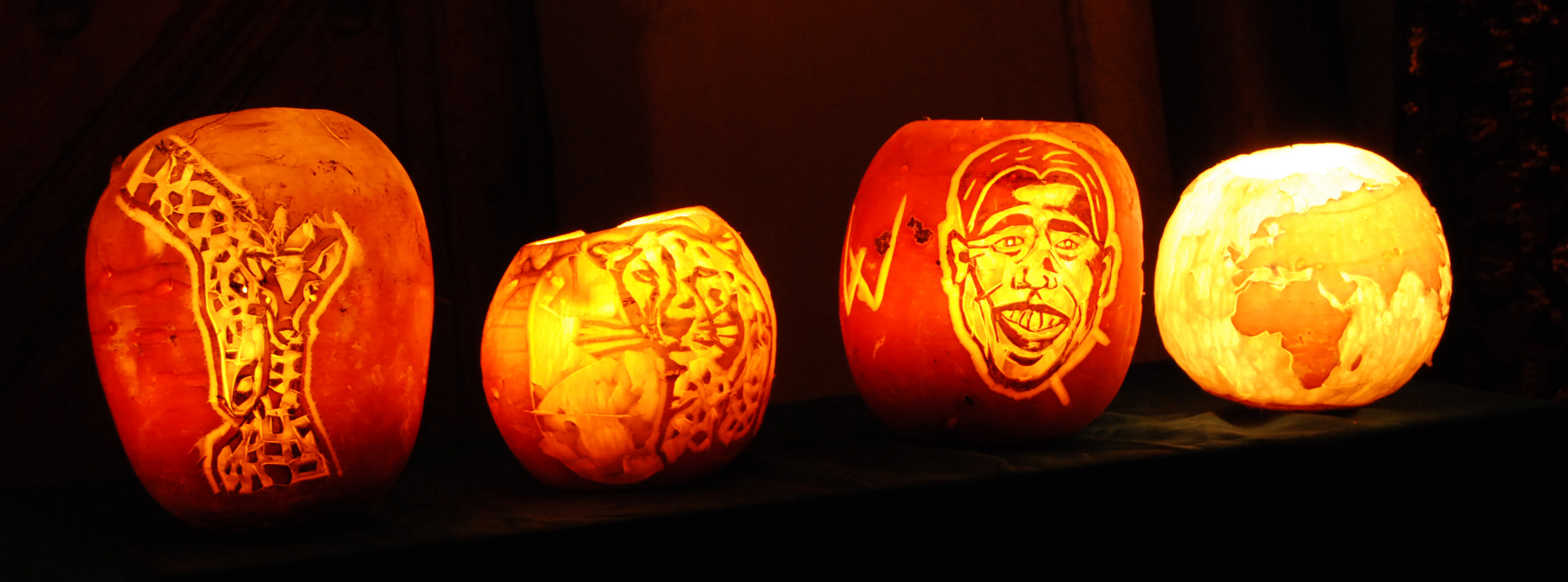
Räbeliechtli on the roadside during the Räbechilbi in Richterswil

While turnips have lost their importance as a staple food today, their use as lanterns remains a vibrant tradition. To create a Räbeliechtli, the turnip is hollowed out with a spoon, leaving the walls about one to two centimeters thick. Using a pointed knife, children and adults carve designs—traditionally motifs like the sun, moon, and stars—into the turnip's purple skin.

Initially, this craft was carried out at home with the family. Nowadays, the activity is often organized by local youth groups, schools, or kindergartens, with the turnips frequently provided by schools or local civic or trade associations.

== Lantern parades ==
The Räbeliechtli is hung using three strings knotted together or carried with a stick. A small candle is placed inside the hollowed-out turnip, and children have these glowing lanterns through dark streets. The light shines through the carved patterns during parades, creating a beautiful display. Street lighting is often turned off during the parade evening, usually in November, to preserve the atmosphere.

After the parades, the lanterns are displayed in windows until the candles burn out. Families or neighborhoods often repeat the process nightly until the lanterns wither and are composted.

Lantern parades are accompanied by traditional songs, such as the German Ich ga mit miner Latärne ("I go with my lantern"), Laterne, Laterne, Sonne, Mond und Stärne ("Lantern, lantern, sun, moon, and stars"), or the Alemannic Rääbeliechtli, wo gasch hii? ("Räbeliechtli, where are you going?").

The tradition of Räbeliechtli parades dates back to the mid-19th century. For example, in Richterswil, the first parades reportedly occurred around 1860. Before that, Räbeliechtli was primarily used by individuals to light their way to evening church services.

== International comparisons ==
Räbeliechtli is not widely known outside of mainland Europe. However, a similar tradition exists on the Isle of Man during the Hop-tu-Naa festival on October 31. Turnip lanterns are carved with symbols such as witches and other spooky designs, likely influenced by Irish Halloween traditions.

== See also ==
- St. Martin's Processions – Similar lantern traditions in other countries
- Jack-o'-lantern
- Hop-tu-Naa
