= Landwasser Viaduct =

Landwasser Viaduct Landwasserviadukt
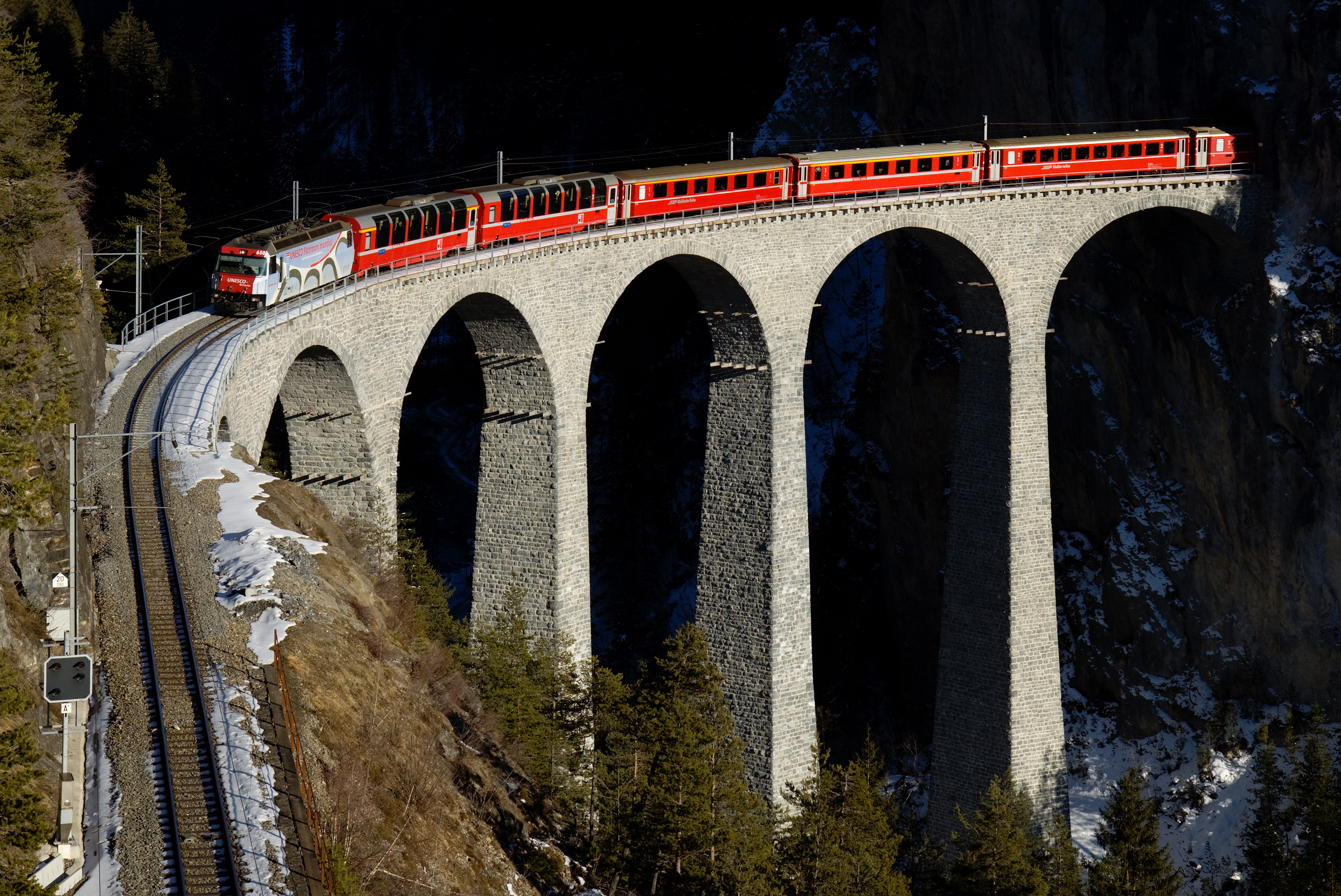
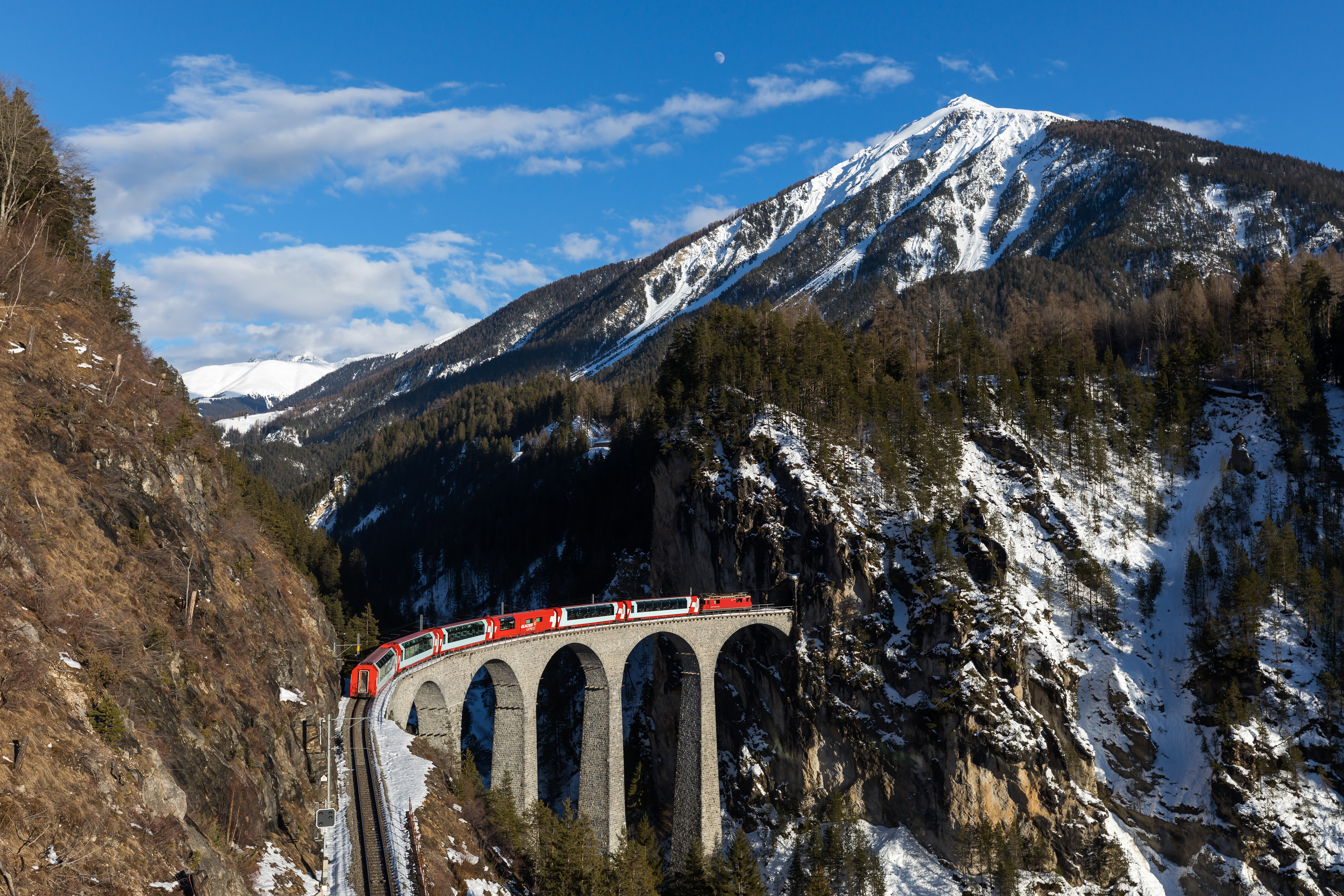
- A train crossing the viaduct View from above
- Coordinates: 46°40′51″N 9°40′33″E
- Carries: Rhaetian Railway (RhB)
- Crosses: Landwasser
- Locale: Schmitten and Filisur, Switzerland
- Official name: Landwasserviadukt
- Owner: Rhaetian Railway (RhB)
- Maintained by: Rhaetian Railway (RhB)
- Heritage status: UNESCO World Heritage Albula Railway

Characteristics
- Design: Viaduct
- Material: Limestone
- Total length: 136 m (446 ft)
- Height: 65 m (213 ft)
- Longest span: 20 m (66 ft)
- No. of spans: six
- Piers in water: 0

History
- Designer: Alexander Acatos
- Constructed by: Müller & Zeerleder
- Construction start: March 1901
- Construction end: 1902
- Construction cost: CHF 280,000 (1902)
- Opened: October 1902
- Rebuilt: 2009 renovation during full usage (CHF 4.6 Million)

Statistics
- Daily traffic: 30 passenger trains, few freight trains

Location
- Interactive map of Landwasser Viaduct

The Landwasser Viaduct (German: Landwasserviadukt) is a single-track six-arched curved limestone railway viaduct. It spans the Landwasser between Schmitten and Filisur, in the canton of Graubünden, Switzerland.

Designed by Alexander Acatos, the Landwasser Viaduct was constructed between 1901 and 1902 by Müller & Zeerleder on behalf of the Rhaetian Railway, which both owns and operates it through to the present day. A signature structure of the World Heritage-listed Albula Railway, it is 65 metres (213 ft) high, 136 metres (446 ft) long; its southeastern abutment connects directly to the Landwasser Tunnel. During 2009, the Landwasser Viaduct underwent renovation work for the first time since its original construction.

== Location ==
Aerial recording of Landwasser Viaduct.

The Landwasser Viaduct, composed of dark limestone, forms part of the Albula Railway section between Tiefencastel and Filisur, and is at the 63.070 kilometres (39.190 mi) mark from Thusis.

To passengers on trains approaching the viaduct from Tiefencastel and Alvaneu on the Albula Railway, the viaduct becomes visible from quite some distance away. The first major feature to be reached on that approach is the Schmittentobel Viaduct, which itself is of considerable size. Then, while crossing the curved Landwasser Viaduct, passengers can observe the front of the train heading into the Landwasser Tunnel. On the other side of the tunnel, the separate line from Davos Platz forms a junction with the Albula Railway just as both lines arrive in Filisur. Shortly before reaching that junction point, passengers on the Davos–Filisur line can experience a view of the viaduct from the northeast.

== Technical details ==
One of the striking features of the Landwasser Viaduct is its highly pronounced curve, which has a radius of 100 metres (328 ft), the minimum used throughout the whole railway. It possesses a height of 65 metres (213 ft) and a length of 142 metres (466 ft). The viaduct's masonry is approximately 9,200 cubic metres (12,000 cu yd) in volume and is jointed with dolomitic limestone. It comprises six arch spans, 20 metres (66 ft) in width, resting on five high pillars; the arches themselves are flat.

The Landwasser Viaduct carries a single railway track, which has a gradient of 2 percent across the structure. The southeastern abutment of the Landwasser Viaduct is located on a high cliff, and at that point, the tracks lead directly into the 216-metre (709 ft) long Landwasser Tunnel. The tunnel's entrance is positioned on a vertical rock wall, having been purposefully aligned with the viaduct. It was considered to be a challenging architectural feat of its era, and its construction employed several innovative techniques.

Construction of the Landwasser Viaduct commenced during 1901 and was completed during the following year. Designed by Alexander Acatos for the Rhaetian Railway, its construction was undertaken by Müller & Zeerleder. The viaduct's construction was performed without the use of scaffolding, instead employing two cranes. The limestone pillars were built up around a steel-reinforced core. During 2009, 106 years after its completion, the masonry and track trough of the viaduct were repaired for the very first time. To facilitate this renovation, modular scaffolding was temporarily erected around the Landwasser Viaduct.

== In popular culture ==
The Landwasser Viaduct briefly appears as a bridge which was destroyed by Rasputin's minions in the 1997 animated film Anastasia. The portrayal was of a taller, 4-storey viaduct very similar to a Roman aqueduct but set in Poland. It also appears within the first couple of minutes of the film “A Cure for Wellness”. Since 2008, the cultural importance of the railway, and features such as Landwasser Viaduct, has been formally recognised by UNESCO, having been placed on a World Heritage list.

== Gallery ==
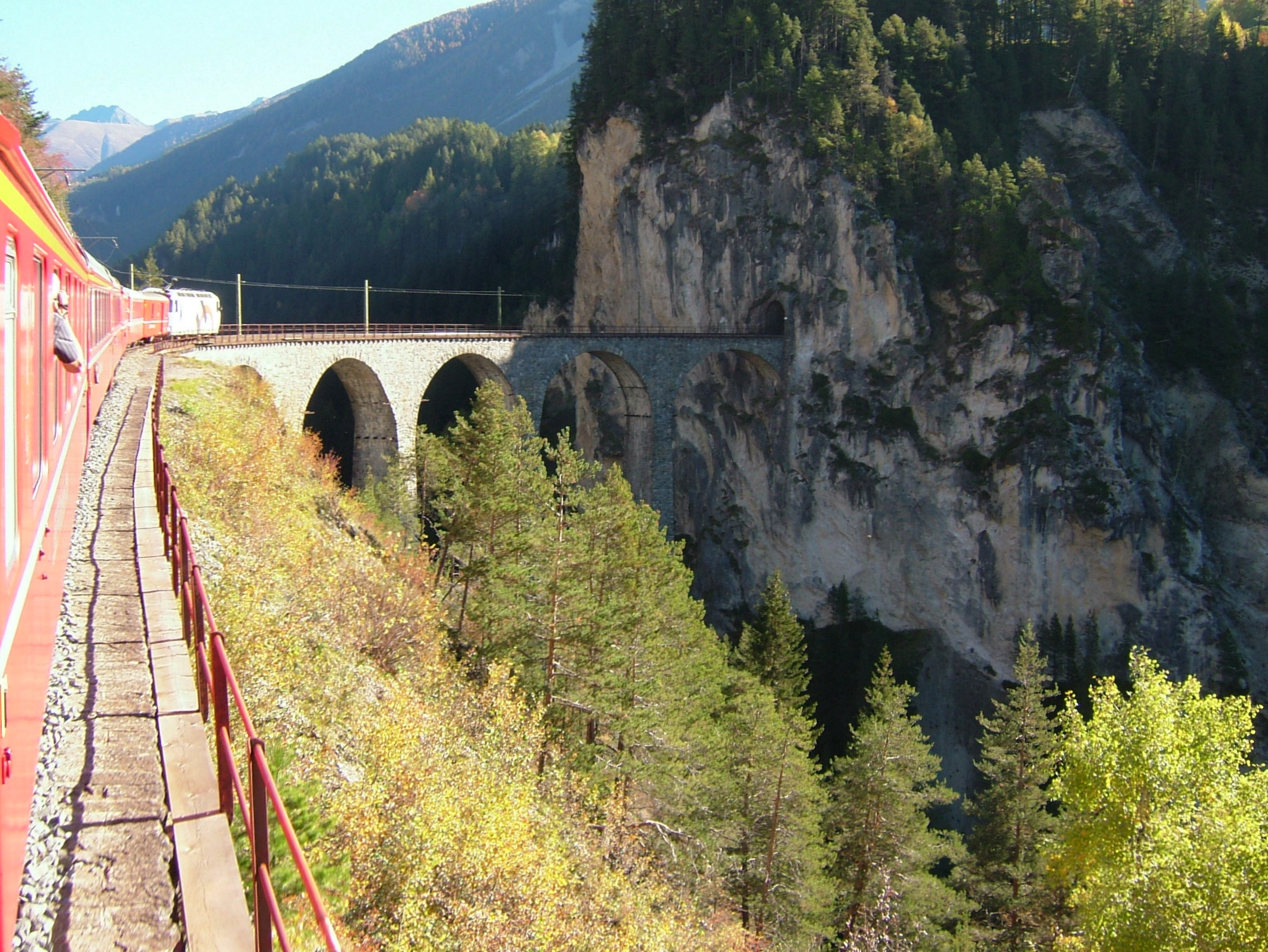
Approaching from Tiefencastel.

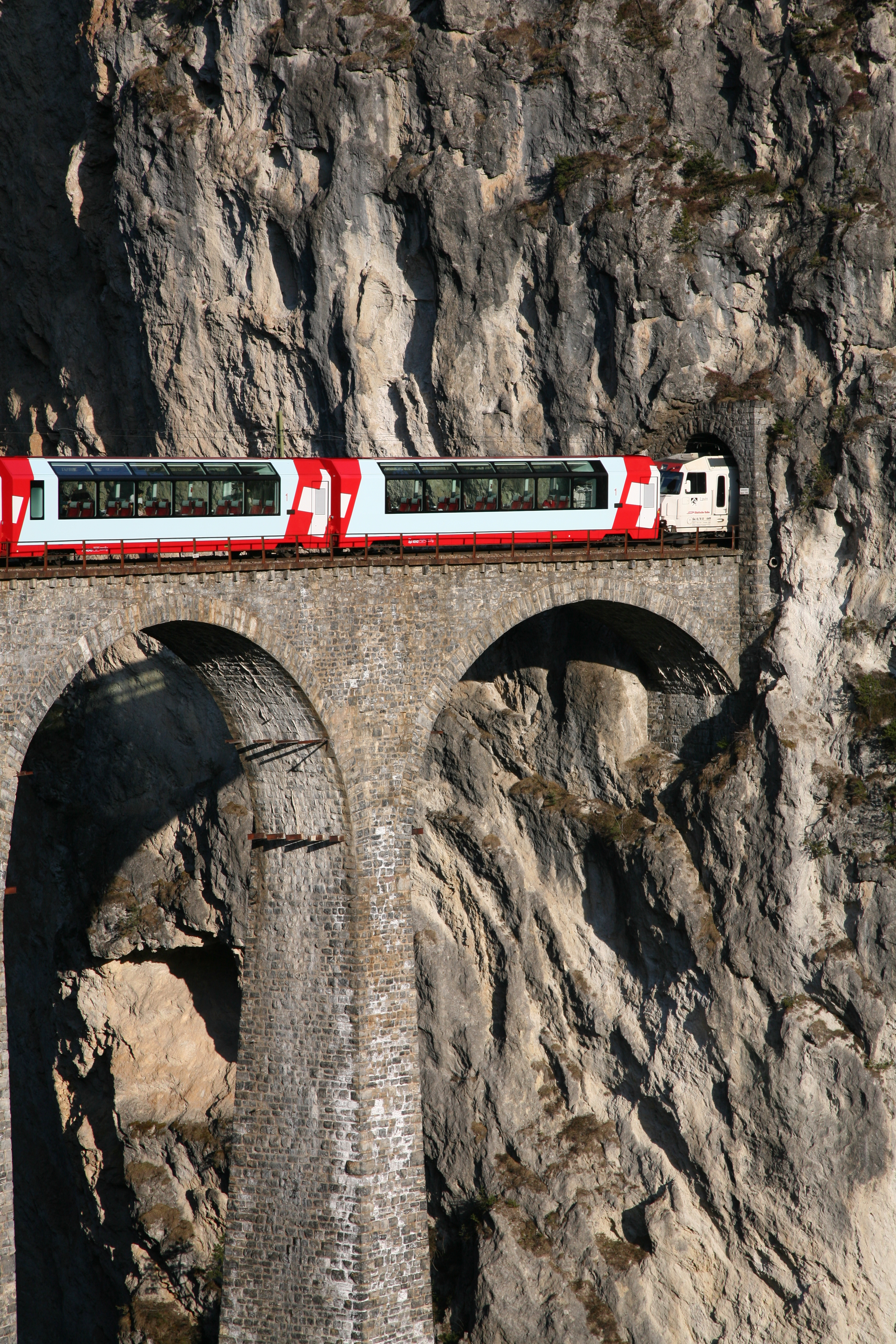
Glacier Express panorama cars entering the Landwasser Tunnel.

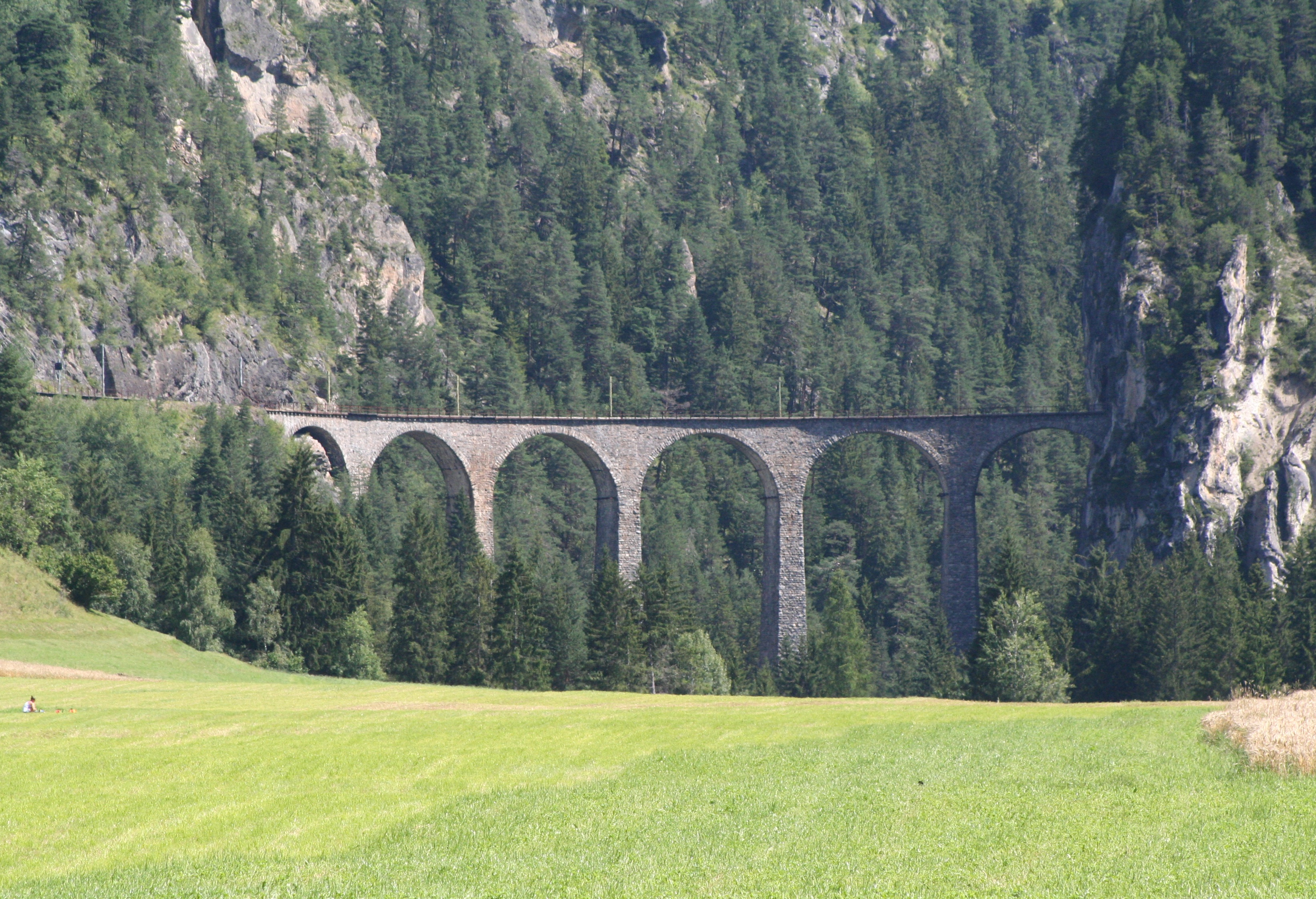
View from the road.

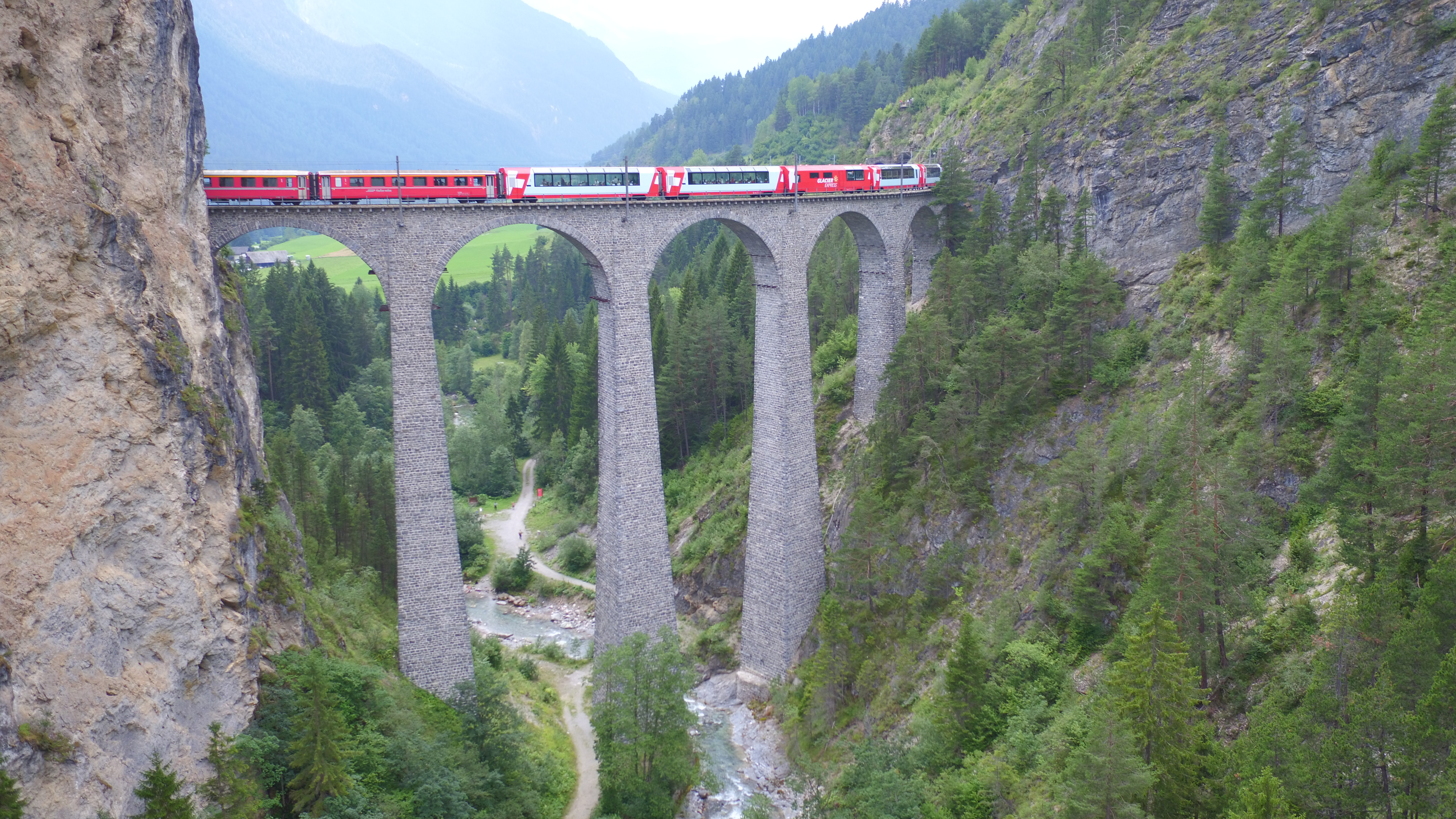
View from northeast.

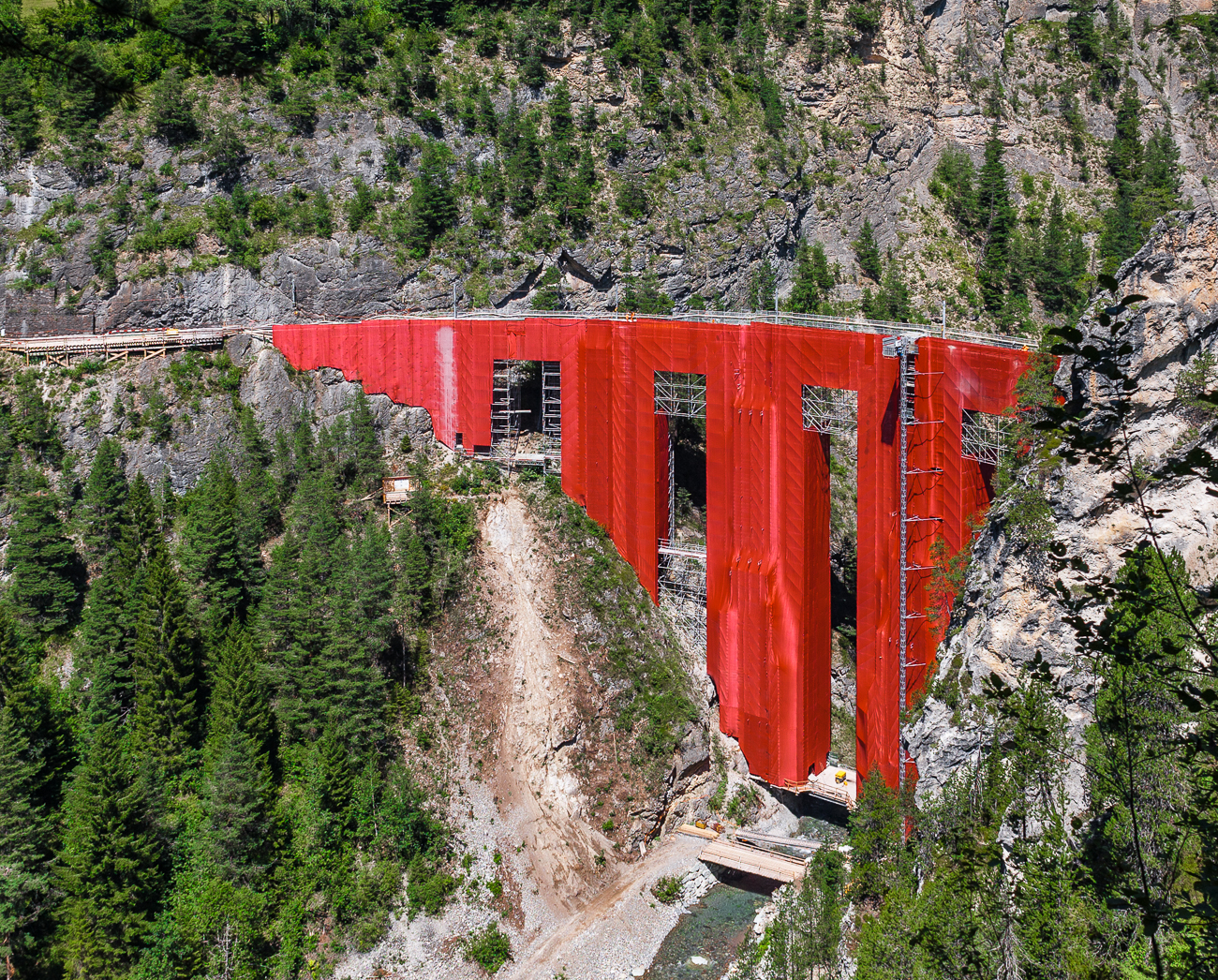
With red cover during renovations

== See also ==
- Albula Railway
- Arch bridge
- Bernina Express
- Filisur (Rhaetian Railway station)
- Glacier Express
- Rhaetian Railway
- Schmitten, Graubünden
- Schmittentobel Viaduct
