= Burebrot =

Swiss bread

- Alternative names: Bauernbrot, pain paysan, pane del nonno
- Type: Bread
- Place of origin: Switzerland
- Created by: Ecole Professionnelle de Richemont
- Main ingredients: Flour (rye and wheat), yeast, milk, water

Burebrot, Bauernbrot, Pain paysan (English: Farmers' bread) or Pane del nonno (English: Grandpa's bread) is a bread made in Switzerland. Unlike most other breads, which are mainly composed of flour, yeast and water, the Burebrot also contains milk.

The bread is made by mixing rye and wheat flour, water, salt, yeast and a leavening agent into a dough, which is formed into a round shape. After 70 to 90 minutes, the surface is cut with a knife to create a decorative lozenge pattern and the bread is baked first at a high, then at a moderate temperature until the crust is crunchy.

Despite its name, the Burebrot is of relatively recent origin: it was developed in 1955 by the Ecole Professionnelle de Richemont in cooperation with the Swiss Bakers' Association as a way to make use of surplus milk. It is now available in most Swiss bakeries and supermarkets as a bread for everyday consumption. As a bread developed by professionals, it is not usually made at home.

== See also ==
- Culinary Heritage of Switzerland

== Bibliography ==
- Koellreuter, Isabel und Nathalie Unternährer, Brot und Stadt. Bäckerhandwerk und Brotkonsum in Basel vom Mittelalter bis zur Gegenwart, Schwabe AG, Basel, 2006.
- 1956, Nr. 9, Sondernummer Spezialbrot, Fachschule Richemont Luzern, ab 1945.
- Bührer, Peter, Schweizer Spezialitäten. Alte Original-Kochrezepte, Editions M, Zürich, 1991.
- La boulangerie suisse, Richement École professionnelle, Lucerne, 2006.
