= Zürcher Murren =

Swiss bread roll

- Alternative names: Pain bernois, Bernerweggen, Spitzweggen, geschnittene Weggli, Zackenweggen
- Type: Bread roll
- Place of origin: Switzerland
- Main ingredients: Flour, milk, butter, yeast, salt, sugar, malt, leavening agent

Zürcher Murren, also called pain bernois, Bernerweggen, Spitzweggen, geschnittene Weggli, or Zackenweggen, are a type of bread roll traditionally made in the German-speaking part of Switzerland, and more rarely, in Romandy.

== History and name ==
The first recorded mention of the Murren appears in a document in from 1508 in the Zürich State Archives. Detailed descriptions of the pastry are found in late 19th-century sources and match the contemporary appearance of the Murren closely. Research by Swiss food historians indicates that the Murren were a specialty of Zürich's bakers until the 20th century, when they became popular in other parts of Switzerland, with the exception of Ticino where they remain largely unknown. Until late in the 20th century, Murren were considered a festive treat, as white flour was too expensive for everyday consumption by most people.

While the bread roll is known as Zürcher Murren (or Zürimurre in the local dialect) in the canton of Zürich, it is referred to as Berner Weggli or Weggen ("Bernese breadrolls") in the canton of Bern and in Romandy, and under generic terms such as Spitzweggen ("pointy breadrolls") elsewhere in Switzerland. The etymology of the word Murren is unclear. It may be derived from Middle High German murr ("blunt"), from Spanish or Portuguese morro ("round"), or from Dutch murw ("brittle").

== Production ==
Like the Weggli, another traditional Swiss bread roll, Murren are made of white flour, milk, butter, yeast, a pinch of salt, sugar, malt and a leavening agent. These ingredients yield a stringy, elastic dough that is allowed to rise for 30 minutes, before being mechanically divided into small pieces.

The pieces are allowed to rise again for half an hour in a heated proofing chamber, and are then superficially sliced with a special tool to produce five cuts that create the Murren's characteristic points after baking. The Murren are coated with egg yolk and baked at 210 °C (410 °F) for 20 minutes, until they are golden brown in colour.

== Consumption and significance ==
Murren are best when freshly baked, as the dough is quick to dry out. They are traditionally eaten at breakfast with jam, honey, or butter; or as a snack with a chocolate branche. The five spikes are the hardest part of the Murren and may injure the palate of incautious eaters.

Commercially, Murren are less commercially significant than the similar and more popular Weggli, although they are generally available in bakeries and supermarkets across northern and central Switzerland.

== Bibliography ==
- Schweizer Bäckerei, Richemont Fachschule, Luzern, 2006.
- 1954, Nr. 4., Fachschule Richemont Luzern, ab 1945.

== See also ==
- Culinary Heritage of Switzerland
