= Stutenkerl =

Sweet yeasted pastry

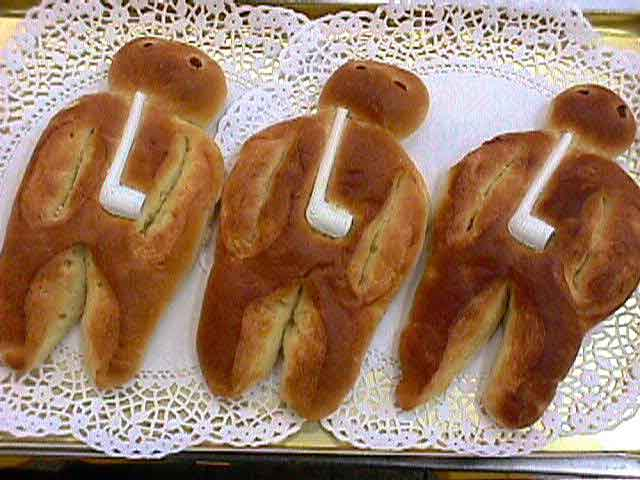
- Type: Sweet bread
- Main ingredients: Flour, milk, sugar

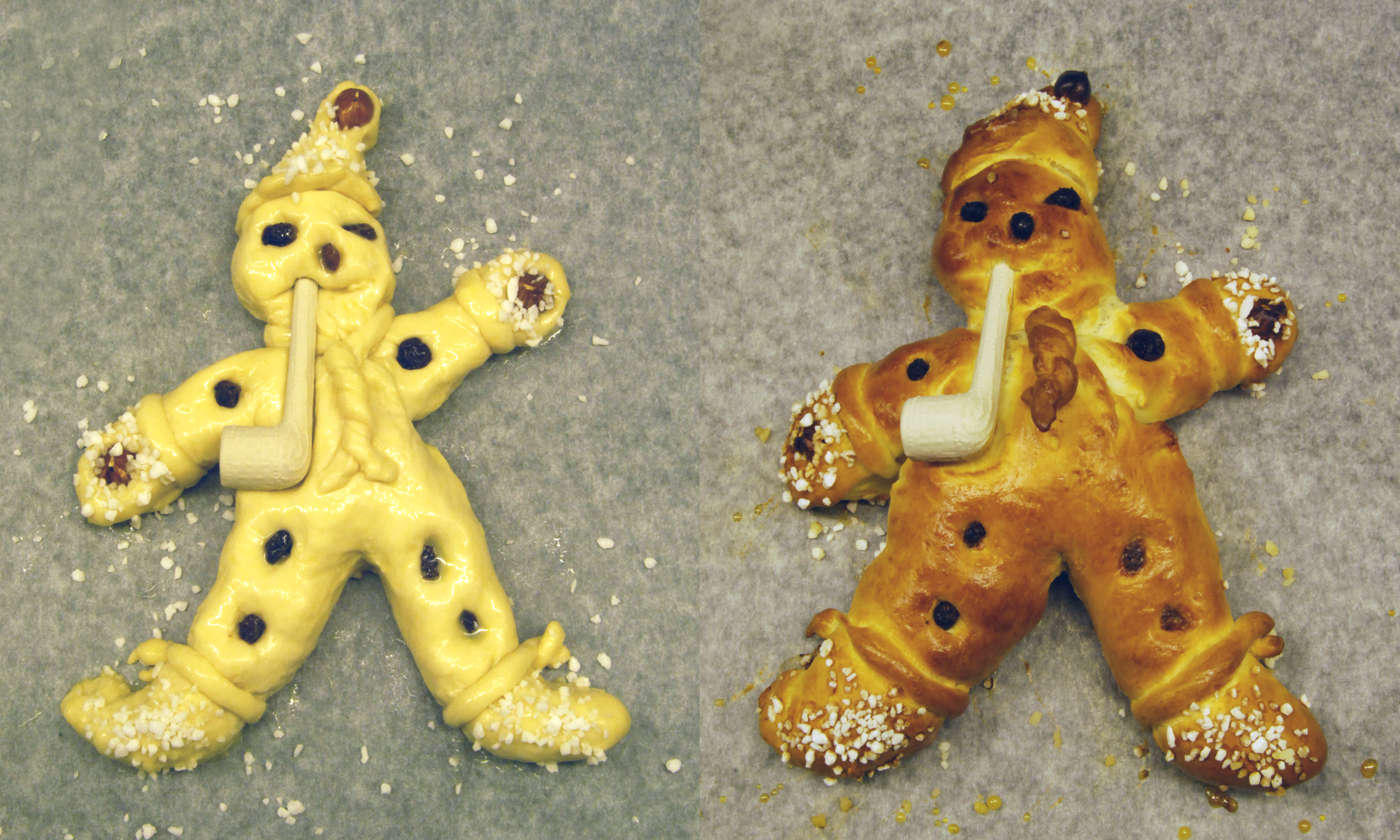
The raw, raisin-studded sweet bread before it is baked, and then after baking

A Stutenkerl (German pronunciation: [ˈʃtuːtn̩ˌkɛʁl]) belongs to the Saint Nicholas tradition in the German-speaking countries. It is a sweet bread made of Stuten, sweet leavened dough, in the form of a man (Kerl is German for 'lad' or 'fellow'). Stutenkerle are generally nationally available around Saint Nicholas Day (December 6), but also regionally around Saint Martin's Day in November in parts of the Rhineland.

There are numerous regional names for the Stutenkerl, such as Weckmann (in the west and south west), Kiepenkerl, Klaaskerl, Stutenmann, Hefekerl, Mannele (in North Alsace and Moselle), Mannala (Sud Alsace), Boxemännchen (in Luxembourg), Grittibänz and Grättimaa (Switzerland).

The sweet bread often features raisins in the place of eyes and a clay pipe. The pipe may have to do with the Reformation, to make the Catholic bishop figure more secular.

== See also ==
- Gingerbread man
