= List of places in Switzerland =

This is a list of places in Switzerland.

== Cities, towns, and villages ==
This list includes municipalities as well as other places with articles.

City	Canton	Local language	Population	Names in other languages
Aarau	AG	de	16,500	
L'Abbaye	VD	fr		
Aigle	VD	fr		
Alpnach	OW	de	5,100	
Appenzell	AI	de	5,200	
Apples	VD	fr		
Arni	AG	de	1,500	
Aubonne	VD	fr		
Bad Ragaz	SG	de		
Baden	AG	de	16,000	
Ballens	VD	fr		
Basel	BS	de	166,300	fr:Bâle, it:Basilea, es:Basilea
Beckenried	NW	de	2,900	
Belmont-sur-Lausanne	VD	fr		
Bern	BE	de	136,300	de:Bern, fr:Bern, it:Berna, es:Berna
Berolle	VD	fr		
Bex	VD	fr		
Biel/Bienne	BE	de, fr	51,900	de: Biel, fr: Bienne
Bière	VD	fr		
Bougy-Villars	VD	fr		
Bühler	AR	de	1,600	
Buochs	NW	de	5,200	
Cham	ZG	de		
Cheseaux-sur-Lausanne	VD	fr		
Chessel	VD	fr		
Chexbres	VD	fr		
Chur	GR	de	32,900	it: Coira, rm: Cuira, fr: Coire
Corbeyrier	VD	fr		
Crissier	VD	fr		
Cunter	GR	de, rm		de: Conters
Dallenwil	NW	de	1,700	
Davos	GR	de	11,000	rm: Tavau
Düdingen	FR	de	7,000	fr: Guin
Egg	ZH	de	7,800	
Emmetten	NW	de	1,200	
Engelberg	OW	de	3,600	
Ennetbürgen	NW	de	4,000	
Ennetmoos	NW	de	2,000	
Epalinges	VD	fr		
Erlenbach	ZH	de	4,500	
Esslingen	ZH	de	1,560	
Etoy	VD	fr		
Féchy	VD	fr		
Feldbach	ZH	de		
Fribourg	FR	fr, de	36,400	de:Freiburg, it:Friburgo, es:Friburgo
Gais	AR	de	2,800	
Geneva	GE	fr	171,000	fr:Genève, it:Ginevra, de:Genf, es:Ginebra
Gimel	VD	fr		
Giswil	OW	de	3,400	
Gonten	AI	de		
Grub	AR	de	1,000	
Gryon	VD	fr		
Habsburg	AG	de	368	
Heiden	AR	de	4,000	
Hergiswil	NW	de	5,300	
Herisau	AR	de	15,600	
Hundwil	AR	de	1,000	
Interlaken	BE	de	5,200	
Jouxtens-Mézery	VD	fr		
Kerns	OW	de	5,300	
Lausanne	VD	fr	128,100	de:Lausanne it:Losanna, es:Lausana
Lauterbrunnen	BE	de		
Lavey-Morcles	VD	fr		
Le Chenit	VD	fr		
Leysin	VD	fr		
Le Chenit	VD	fr		
Locarno	TI	it		
Longirod	VD	fr		
Lucerne	LU	de	61,000	de: Luzern, fr: Lucerne, it: Lucerna
Lugano	TI	it	52,000	
Lungern	OW	de	2,000	
Lutzenberg	AR	de	1,200	
Männedorf	ZH	de	9,235	
Meilen	ZH	de	11,500	
Le Mont-sur-Lausanne	VD	fr		
Montreux	VD	fr	22,900	
Neuchâtel	NE	fr	31,571	de: Neuenburg
Noville	VD	fr		
Oberdorf	NW	de	3,000	
Oberegg	AI	de		
Ollon	VD	fr		
Ormont-Dessous	VD	fr		
Ormont-Dessus	VD	fr		
Paudex	VD	fr		
Prilly	VD	fr		
Pully	VD	fr		
Rapperswil	SG	de	7,750	
Rehetobel	AR	de	1,700	
Reichenau	GR	de		
Renens	VD	fr	18,000	
Rennaz	VD	fr		
Reute	AR	de	670	
Roche	VD	fr		
Rolle	VD	fr	4,148	
Romanel-sur-Lausanne	VD	fr		
Rüte	AI	de		
Sachseln	OW	de	4,400	
Sarnen	OW	de	9,400	
Schaffhausen	SH	de	34,200	it: Sciaffusa
Schlatt-Haslen	AI	de		
Schleinikon	ZH	de	664	
Schönengrund	AR	de	470	
Schwellbrunn	AR	de	1,500	
Schwyz	SZ	de		it: Svitto
Schwende	AI	de		
Sion	VS	fr	27,200	de: Sitten
Solothurn	SO	de	15,300	fr: Soleure, it: Soletta
Speicher	AR	de	4,000	
St. Gallen	SG	de	75,200	fr: St-Gall, it: San Gallo
St. Moritz	GR	de, rm	5,600	rm: San Murrezan
Stans	NW	de	7,300	
Stansstad	NW	de	4,500	
Stein	AR	de	1,400	
Teufen	AR	de	5,600	
Thal	SG	de	5,000	
Thalwil	ZH	de	16,000	
Thun	BE	de	38,200	
Trogen	AR	de	1,900	
Urnäsch	AR	de	2,300	
Uzwil	SG	de	12,100	
Vevey	VD	fr	15,500	
Villeneuve	VD	fr		
Wald	AR	de	900	
Waldstatt	AR	de	1,700	
Walzenhausen	AR	de	2,100	
Weiach	ZH	de	1,014	
Wildhaus	SG	de	1,258	
Winterthur	ZH	de	87,000	
Wolfenschiessen	NW	de	2,000	
Wolfhalden	AR	de	1,700	
Yvorne	VD	fr		
Zug	ZG	de	21,700	fr: Zoug, it: Zugo
Zürich	ZH	de	365,000	de:Zürich, it:Zurigo, es:Zúrich

== See also ==
- List of cities in Switzerland
- List of municipalities of Switzerland
