= Michel F. Bolle =

Swiss volleyball player

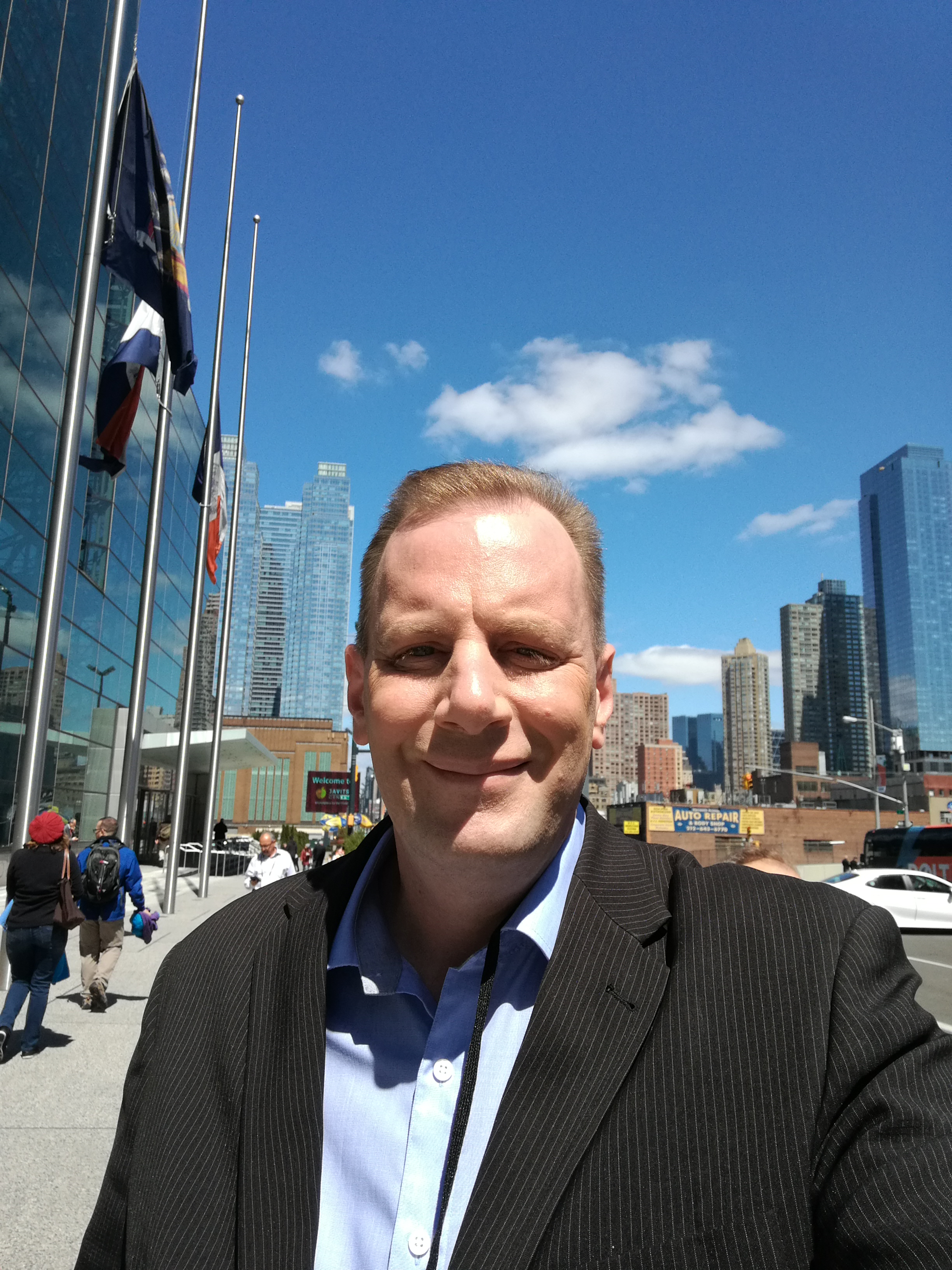
- Bolle in 2018

Personal information
- Nickname: Mitch-Magic
- Nationality: Swiss
- Born: April 24, 1970 (age 56); Bern, Switzerland
- Hometown: Biel, Switzerland
- Education: Kerzers

Coaching information
- Current team: VBC Delémont

Michel F. Bolle (born 24 April 1970) is a former Swiss volleyball player and currently a volleyball coach and executive.

== Life and career ==
Bolle grew up as a son of an industrial family in Hedingen and Kerzers. As a child, he was a soccer player and cyclist. At the age of 14, he started to play volleyball at VBC Kerzers Volleyball Club.

After finishing elementary school, he signed a professional contract with the team of VBC Leysin (the former team of the American College of Switzerland in Leysin). With the Leysin, he won the Swiss championship three times (1988-1990) and won the Swiss Cup four times (1988–1991). From 1991 to 1997, Bolle played with the Lausanne University team (LUC) and won the Swiss championship yet another four times (1992–1995). With LUC he also won the Swiss Cup in 1995. During this period Bolle was a member first of the Swiss Junior National Team and later, for many years, part of the Elite National Team.

In 2000, Bolle retired as an active player and became a volleyball coach at VBC Ecublens.

Bolle has coached the Swiss first division (NLA) men teams of Lausanne UC and Seat Volley Naefels, and later the first division women teams of VBC Biel-Bienne and TSV Duedingen. His achievements as a coach include several gold and silver medals at Swiss youth championships, a silver and bronze medal with the Lausanne UC Team in the Swiss NLA Championship and de silver medal in the Swiss Supercup as well as reaching the 1/8 final in European Cup with Seat Volley Naefels. With the Lausanne University Team, he has twice won the Swiss University Championship. During this period Bolle has also coached the Swiss Volley Talent Schools in Lausanne, Jona and Bern.

From 1994 to 2010, Bolle was the head coach of the Swiss men’s Volleyball National team. During this period his team achieved exceptional victories against France (2006 in Biel) and Russia (2007 Thailand) as well as against Germany. At the University World Championships 2009 in Belgrad the Swiss Team reached an outstanding 11th rank which was the best placement of a Swiss men’s team so far.

Since 2007 Bolle, is a Volleyball Teaching Expert and has made an important contribution in teaching young volleyball coaches.

In 2011 Bolle founded the Swiss Volleyball Coaches Associations and was its president.

In September 2016 Michel F. Bolle released his first book on a worldwide basis, Nature Hits Back. He has authored several other books.
