= Roche, Vaud =

Roche
- Municipality
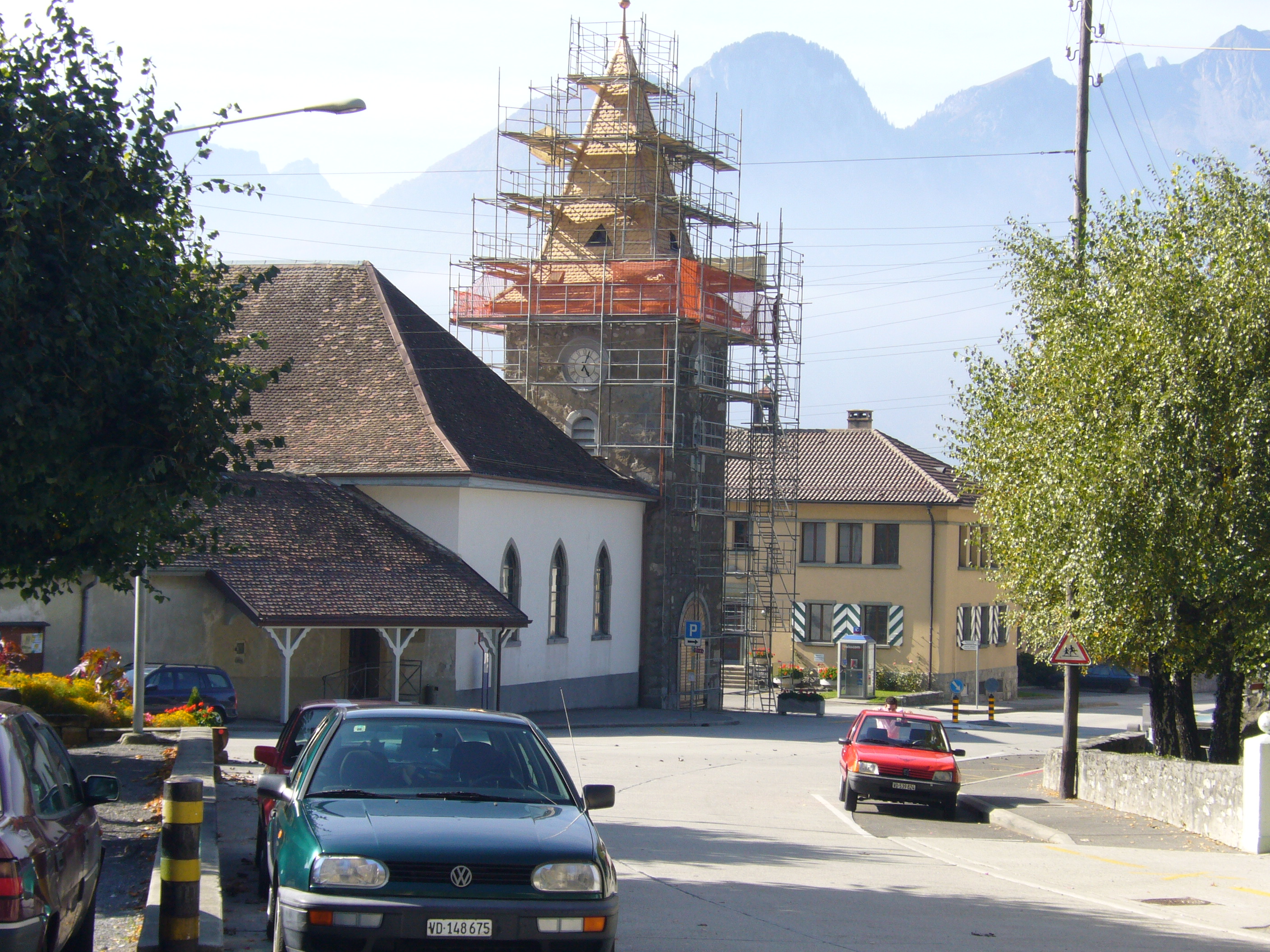

- Flag Coat of arms
- Location of Roche
- Location within Switzerland Location within Canton of Vaud
- Coordinates: 46°21′N 6°55′E
- Country: Switzerland
- Canton: Vaud
- District: Aigle

Government
  - Mayor: Syndic

Area
  - Total: 6.44 km^{2} (2.49 sq mi)
- Elevation: 384 m (1,260 ft)

Population (2000)
  - Total: 877
  - Density: 136/km^{2} (353/sq mi)
- Time zone: UTC+01:00 (CET)
  - Summer (DST): UTC+02:00 (CEST)
- Postal code: 1852
- SFOS number: 5413
- ISO 3166 code: CH-VD
- Surrounded by: Chessel, Corbeyrier, Noville, Rennaz, Villeneuve, Yvorne
- Website: roche-vd.ch

Roche is a municipality in the canton of Vaud in Switzerland, located in the district of Aigle.

== History ==
Roche is first mentioned in 1177 as Rochi.

== Geography ==
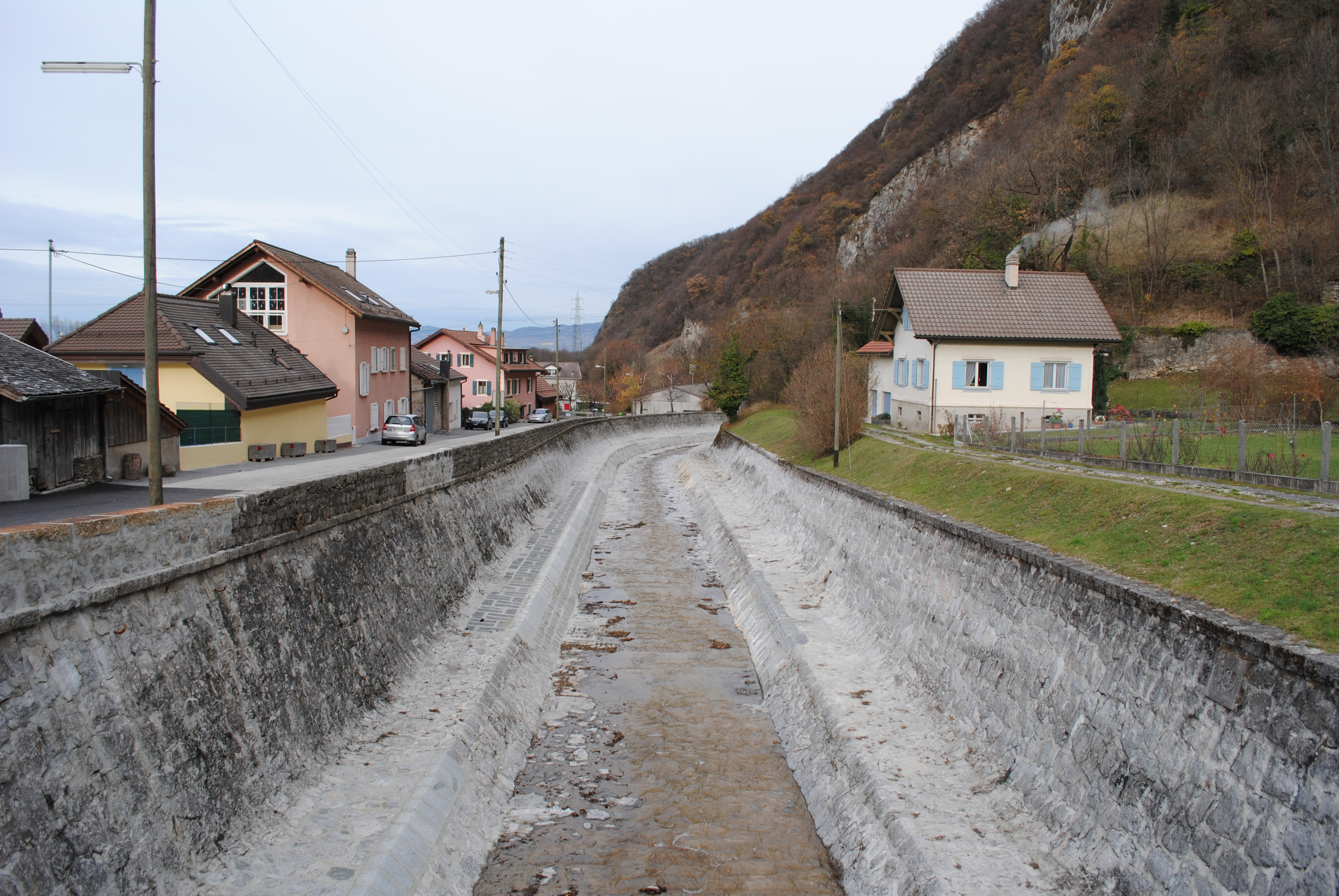
Course of the Eau Froide river

Roche has an area, as of 2009, of 6.44 square kilometers (2.49 sq mi). Of this area, 3.28 km^{2} (1.27 sq mi) or 50.9% is used for agricultural purposes, while 1.92 km^{2} (0.74 sq mi) or 29.8% is forested. Of the rest of the land, 1.1 km^{2} (0.42 sq mi) or 17.1% is settled (buildings or roads), 0.05 km^{2} (12 acres) or 0.8% is either rivers or lakes and 0.06 km^{2} (15 acres) or 0.9% is unproductive land.

Of the built up area, industrial buildings made up 1.7% of the total area while housing and buildings made up 4.7% and transportation infrastructure made up 6.2%. Power and water infrastructure as well as other special developed areas made up 4.0% of the area Out of the forested land, all of the forested land area is covered with heavy forests. Of the agricultural land, 45.8% is used for growing crops and 4.0% is pastures, while 1.1% is used for orchards or vine crops. All the water in the municipality is flowing water.

The municipality is located in the Aigle district, in the Rhone valley at the foot of Mont d'Arvel and along the banks of the Eau Froide gelegen. It consists of the village of Roche and the hamlets of Bez. Aigle, in der Rhoneebene am Fuss des Mont d'Arvel und am Ufer der Eau Froide gelegen.

== Coat of arms ==
The blazon of the municipal coat of arms is Per pale Argent and Azure, a base chevrony irregular per pale Vert and Sable, a pine tree Vert and a Chamois proper.

== Demographics ==
Roche has a population (as of December 2020) of 1,867. As of 2008, 19.9% of the population are resident foreign nationals. Over the last 10 years (1999–2009) the population has changed at a rate of 5.9%. It has changed at a rate of 7.5% due to migration and at a rate of -0.9% due to births and deaths.

Most of the population (as of 2000) speaks French (835 or 93.4%), with German being second most common (18 or 2.0%) and Italian being third (13 or 1.5%).

Of the population in the municipality 288 or about 32.2% were born in Roche and lived there in 2000. There were 296 or 33.1% who were born in the same canton, while 149 or 16.7% were born somewhere else in Switzerland, and 122 or 13.6% were born outside of Switzerland.

In 2008 there were 11 live births to Swiss citizens and 4 births to non-Swiss citizens, and in same time span there were 9 deaths of Swiss citizens. Ignoring immigration and emigration, the population of Swiss citizens increased by 2 while the foreign population increased by 4. There were 2 Swiss men who emigrated from Switzerland. At the same time, there were 5 non-Swiss men and 11 non-Swiss women who immigrated from another country to Switzerland. The total Swiss population change in 2008 (from all sources, including moves across municipal borders) was an increase of 20 and the non-Swiss population increased by 26 people. This represents a population growth rate of 5.1%.

The age distribution, as of 2009, in Roche is; 100 children or 10.5% of the population are between 0 and 9 years old and 119 teenagers or 12.5% are between 10 and 19. Of the adult population, 115 people or 12.0% of the population are between 20 and 29 years old. 121 people or 12.7% are between 30 and 39, 140 people or 14.7% are between 40 and 49, and 132 people or 13.8% are between 50 and 59. The senior population distribution is 117 people or 12.3% of the population are between 60 and 69 years old, 64 people or 6.7% are between 70 and 79, there are 43 people or 4.5% who are 80 and 89, and there are 4 people or 0.4% who are 90 and older.

As of 2000, there were 309 people who were single and never married in the municipality. There were 469 married individuals, 70 widows or widowers and 46 individuals who are divorced.

As of 2000, there were 369 private households in the municipality, and an average of 2.3 persons per household. There were 115 households that consist of only one person and 13 households with five or more people. Out of a total of 376 households that answered this question, 30.6% were households made up of just one person and there were 2 adults who lived with their parents. Of the rest of the households, there are 117 married couples without children, 115 married couples with children There were 16 single parents with a child or children. There were 4 households that were made up of unrelated people and 7 households that were made up of some sort of institution or another collective housing.

In 2000 there were 110 single family homes (or 55.3% of the total) out of a total of 199 inhabited buildings. There were 53 multi-family buildings (26.6%), along with 20 multi-purpose buildings that were mostly used for housing (10.1%) and 16 other use buildings (commercial or industrial) that also had some housing (8.0%). Of the single family homes 27 were built before 1919, while 4 were built between 1990 and 2000. The most multi-family homes (24) were built before 1919 and the next most (7) were built between 1961 and 1970.

In 2000 there were 428 apartments in the municipality. The most common apartment size was 3 rooms of which there were 142. There were 19 single room apartments and 78 apartments with five or more rooms. Of these apartments, a total of 359 apartments (83.9% of the total) were permanently occupied, while 43 apartments (10.0%) were seasonally occupied and 26 apartments (6.1%) were empty. As of 2009, the construction rate of new housing units was 51.3 new units per 1000 residents. The vacancy rate for the municipality, in 2010, was 1.04%.

The historical population is given in the following chart:

== Politics ==
In the 2007 federal election the most popular party was the SP which received 35.31% of the vote. The next three most popular parties were the SVP (29.04%), the FDP (18.61%) and the Green Party (5.64%). In the federal election, a total of 203 votes were cast, and the voter turnout was 35.0%.

== Economy ==
As of 2010, Roche had an unemployment rate of 4.4%. As of 2008, there were 46 people employed in the primary economic sector and about 11 businesses involved in this sector. 247 people were employed in the secondary sector and there were 16 businesses in this sector. 171 people were employed in the tertiary sector, with 35 businesses in this sector. There were 462 residents of the municipality who were employed in some capacity, of which females made up 40.5% of the workforce.

In 2008 the total number of full-time equivalent jobs was 416. The number of jobs in the primary sector was 38, all of which were in agriculture. The number of jobs in the secondary sector was 237 of which 129 or (54.4%) were in manufacturing and 84 (35.4%) were in construction. The number of jobs in the tertiary sector was 141. In the tertiary sector; 82 or 58.2% were in wholesale or retail sales or the repair of motor vehicles, 23 or 16.3% were in the movement and storage of goods, 9 or 6.4% were in a hotel or restaurant, 2 or 1.4% were in the information industry, 8 or 5.7% were technical professionals or scientists, 5 or 3.5% were in education and 2 or 1.4% were in health care.

In 2000, there were 256 workers who commuted into the municipality and 327 workers who commuted away. The municipality is a net exporter of workers, with about 1.3 workers leaving the municipality for every one entering. About 4.3% of the workforce coming into Roche are coming from outside Switzerland. Of the working population, 11.7% used public transportation to get to work, and 64.3% used a private car.

== Religion ==
From the 2000 census, 285 or 31.9% were Roman Catholic, while 447 or 50.0% belonged to the Swiss Reformed Church. Of the rest of the population, there were 2 members of an Orthodox church (or about 0.22% of the population), and there were 18 individuals (or about 2.01% of the population) who belonged to another Christian church. There were 9 (or about 1.01% of the population) who were Islamic. There were 3 individuals who were Buddhist. 70 (or about 7.83% of the population) belonged to no church, are agnostic or atheist, and 60 individuals (or about 6.71% of the population) did not answer the question.

== Education ==
In Roche about 364 or (40.7%) of the population have completed non-mandatory upper secondary education, and 41 or (4.6%) have completed additional higher education (either university or a Fachhochschule). Of the 41 who completed tertiary schooling, 65.9% were Swiss men, 14.6% were Swiss women, 14.6% were non-Swiss men.

In the 2009/2010 school year there were a total of 156 students in the Roche (VD) school district. In the Vaud cantonal school system, two years of non-obligatory pre-school are provided by the political districts. During the school year, the political district provided pre-school care for a total of 205 children of which 96 children (46.8%) received subsidized pre-school care. The canton's primary school program requires students to attend for four years. There were 88 students in the municipal primary school program. The obligatory lower secondary school program lasts for six years and there were 66 students in those schools. There were also 2 students who were home schooled or attended another non-traditional school.

As of 2000, there were 86 students in Roche who came from another municipality, while 65 residents attended schools outside the municipality.

== Transportation ==
The municipality has a railway station, Roche VD, on the Simplon line. It has regular service to Grandson, Lausanne, and Aigle.
