= Aigle District =

Coordinates: 46°19′N 7°03′E

Aigle District District d'Aigle
- District
- Country: Switzerland
- Canton: Vaud
- Capital: Aigle

Area
  - Total: 434.99 km^{2} (167.95 sq mi)

Population (2020)
  - Total: 46,253
  - Density: 106.33/km^{2} (275.40/sq mi)
- Time zone: UTC+1 (CET)
  - Summer (DST): UTC+2 (CEST)
- Municipalities: 15

Aigle District is a district of the canton of Vaud, Switzerland.

== Geography ==
Aigle has an area, as of 2009, of 434.99 square kilometers (167.95 sq mi). Of this area, 147.87 km^{2} (57.09 sq mi) or 34.0% is used for agricultural purposes, while 179.6 km^{2} (69.3 sq mi) or 41.3% is forested. Of the rest of the land, 30.47 km^{2} (11.76 sq mi) or 7.0% is settled (buildings or roads) and 77.07 km^{2} (29.76 sq mi) or 17.7% is unproductive land.

== Demographics ==
Aigle has a population (as of December 2020) of 46,253.

Most of the population (as of 2000) speaks French (28,451 or 80.7%), with German being second most common (1,268 or 3.6%) and Portuguese being third (884 or 2.5%). There are 848 people who speak Italian and 12 people who speak Romansh.

Of the population in the district, 9,782 or about 27.8% were born in Aigle and lived there in 2000. There were 8,375 or 23.8% who were born in the same canton, while 5,629 or 16.0% were born somewhere else in Switzerland, and 9,818 or 27.9% were born outside of Switzerland.

In 2008 there were 239 live births to Swiss citizens and 126 births to non-Swiss citizens, and in the same time span there were 277 deaths of Swiss citizens and 25 non-Swiss citizen deaths. Ignoring immigration and emigration, the population of Swiss citizens decreased by 38 while the foreign population increased by 101. There were 7 Swiss men and 10 Swiss women who immigrated back to Switzerland. At the same time, there were 424 non-Swiss men and 489 non-Swiss women who immigrated from another country to Switzerland. The total Swiss population change in 2008 (from all sources, including moves across municipal borders) was an increase of 467 and the non-Swiss population increased by 617 people. This represents a population growth rate of 2.9%.

The age distribution, as of 2009, in Aigle is; 3,871 children or 10.0% of the population are between 0 and 9 years old and 5,803 teenagers or 14.9% are between 10 and 19. Of the adult population, 4,945 people or 12.7% of the population are between 20 and 29 years old. 4,632 people or 11.9% are between 30 and 39, 5,868 people or 15.1% are between 40 and 49, and 5,034 people or 12.9% are between 50 and 59. The senior population distribution is 4,297 people or 11.1% of the population are between 60 and 69 years old, 2,670 people or 6.9% are between 70 and 79, there are 1,486 people or 3.8% who are 80 and 89, and there are 274 people or 0.7% who are 90 and older.

As of 2000, there were 14,446 people who were single and never married in the district. There were 16,669 married individuals, 2,153 widows or widowers and 1,980 individuals who are divorced.

There were 5,070 households that consist of only one person and 866 households with five or more people. Out of a total of 14,785 households that answered this question, 34.3% were households made up of just one person and there were 85 adults who lived with their parents. Of the rest of the households, there are 3,900 married couples without children, 4,249 married couples with children There were 810 single parents with a child or children. There were 186 households that were made up of unrelated people and 485 households that were made up of some sort of institution or another collective housing.

== Municipalities ==
The following municipalities are located in the district:

Municipality	Population (31 December 2020)	Area km^{2}
Aigle	10,462	16.41
Bex	7,845	96.56
Chessel	444	3.57
Corbeyrier	445	21.99
Gryon	1,376	15.22
Lavey-Morcles	944	14.19
Leysin	3,623	18.57
Noville	1,178	10.35
Ollon	7,624	59.54
Ormont-Dessous	1,182	64.07
Ormont-Dessus	1,467	61.65
Rennaz	892	2.19
Roche	1,867	6.44
Villeneuve	5,834	32.04
Yvorne	1,070	12.20
Total	46,253	434.99

== Historic population ==
The historical population is given in the following chart:

== Politics ==
In the 2007 federal election the most popular party was the SVP which received 27.7% of the vote. The next three most popular parties were the SP (20.65%), the FDP (20.58%) and the Green Party (10.6%). In the federal election, a total of 8,604 votes were cast, and the voter turnout was 42.2%.

== Religion ==
From the 2000 census, 14,234 or 40.4% belonged to the Swiss Reformed Church, while 11,386 or 32.3% were Roman Catholic. Of the rest of the population, there were 564 members of an Orthodox church (or about 1.60% of the population), there were 19 individuals (or about 0.05% of the population) who belonged to the Christian Catholic Church, and there were 670 individuals (or about 1.90% of the population) who belonged to another Christian church. There were 21 individuals (or about 0.06% of the population) who were Jewish, and 1,832 (or about 5.20% of the population) who were Islamic. There were 142 individuals who were Buddhist, 120 individuals who were Hindu and 89 individuals who belonged to another church. 3,667 (or about 10.40% of the population) belonged to no church, are agnostic or atheist, and 2,504 individuals (or about 7.10% of the population) did not answer the question.

== Education ==
In Aigle about 11,421 or (32.4%) of the population have completed non-mandatory upper secondary education, and 3,594 or (10.2%) have completed additional higher education (either University or a Fachhochschule). Of the 3,594 who completed tertiary schooling, 47.7% were Swiss men, 25.3% were Swiss women, 15.1% were non-Swiss men and 11.8% were non-Swiss women.

In the 2009/2010 school year, there were a total of 4,435 students in the local and district school systems. In the Vaud cantonal school system, two years of non-obligatory pre-school are provided by the political districts. During the school year, the district provided pre-school care for a total of 205 children. There were 96 (46.8%) children who received subsidized pre-school care. There were 2,316 students in the primary school program, which last four years. The obligatory lower secondary school program lasts for six years and there were 1,987 students in those schools. There were also 132 students who were homeschooled or attended another non-traditional school.
