= Rennaz =

- Municipality
- Flag Coat of arms
- Location of Rennaz
- Location within Switzerland Location within Canton of Vaud
- Coordinates: 46°22′N 6°55′E
- Country: Switzerland
- Canton: Vaud
- District: Aigle

Government
  - Mayor: Syndic

Area
  - Total: 2.19 km^{2} (0.85 sq mi)
- Elevation: 375 m (1,230 ft)

Population (2000)
  - Total: 575
  - Density: 263/km^{2} (680/sq mi)
- Demonym: Renard
- Time zone: UTC+01:00 (CET)
  - Summer (DST): UTC+02:00 (CEST)
- Postal code: 1847
- SFOS number: 5412
- ISO 3166 code: CH-VD
- Surrounded by: Noville, Roche, Villeneuve
- Website: rennaz.ch

Rennaz (Franco-Provençal pronunciation: [ˈrɛn.na]]) is a municipality of the canton of Vaud in Switzerland, located in the district of Aigle.

== History ==
Rennaz is first mentioned in 1252 as ad villam de rayna.

== Geography ==
Rennaz has an area, as of 2009, of 2.19 square kilometers (0.85 sq mi). Of this area, 1.48 km^{2} (0.57 sq mi) or 67.6% is used for agricultural purposes, while 0.04 km^{2} (0.015 sq mi) or 1.8% is forested. Of the rest of the land, 0.68 km^{2} (0.26 sq mi) or 31.1% is settled (buildings or roads), 0.01 km^{2} (2.5 acres) or 0.5% is either rivers or lakes.

Of the built up area, industrial buildings made up 3.2% of the total area while housing and buildings made up 8.7% and transportation infrastructure made up 14.2%. Power and water infrastructure as well as other special developed areas made up 1.8% of the area while parks, green belts and sports fields made up 3.2%. Out of the forested land, all of the forested land area is covered with heavy forests. Of the agricultural land, 57.1% is used for growing crops and 6.8% is pastures, while 3.7% is used for orchards or vine crops. All the water in the municipality is flowing water.

The municipality is located in the Aigle district, along the Rhone river.

== Coat of arms ==
The blazon of the municipal coat of arms is Per fess Sable and Or, overall a Fox rampant Gules.

== Demographics ==
Rennaz has a population (as of December 2020) of 892. As of 2008, 29.8% of the population are resident foreign nationals. Over the last 10 years (1999–2009 ) the population has changed at a rate of 12.6%. It has changed at a rate of 2% due to migration and at a rate of 10.6% due to births and deaths.

Most of the population (as of 2000) speaks French (492 or 87.1%), with German being second most common (21 or 3.7%) and Italian being third (20 or 3.5%).

Of the population in the municipality 103 or about 18.2% were born in Rennaz and lived there in 2000. There were 247 or 43.7% who were born in the same canton, while 91 or 16.1% were born somewhere else in Switzerland, and 118 or 20.9% were born outside of Switzerland.

In 2008 there were 4 live births to Swiss citizens and 4 births to non-Swiss citizens, and in same time span there were 2 deaths of Swiss citizens. Ignoring immigration and emigration, the population of Swiss citizens increased by 2 while the foreign population increased by 4. There were 2 Swiss women who emigrated from Switzerland. At the same time, there were 2 non-Swiss men who emigrated from Switzerland to another country and 6 non-Swiss women who immigrated from another country to Switzerland. The total Swiss population change in 2008 (from all sources, including moves across municipal borders) was an increase of 3 and the non-Swiss population increased by 12 people. This represents a population growth rate of 2.5%.

The age distribution, as of 2009, in Rennaz is; 77 children or 12.5% of the population are between 0 and 9 years old and 73 teenagers or 11.9% are between 10 and 19. Of the adult population, 74 people or 12.1% of the population are between 20 and 29 years old. 88 people or 14.3% are between 30 and 39, 116 people or 18.9% are between 40 and 49, and 79 people or 12.9% are between 50 and 59. The senior population distribution is 57 people or 9.3% of the population are between 60 and 69 years old, 33 people or 5.4% are between 70 and 79, there are 13 people or 2.1% who are 80 and 89, and there are 4 people or 0.7% who are 90 and older.

As of 2000, there were 236 people who were single and never married in the municipality. There were 272 married individuals, 26 widows or widowers and 31 individuals who are divorced.

As of 2000, there were 230 private households in the municipality, and an average of 2.4 persons per household. There were 68 households that consist of only one person and 13 households with five or more people. Out of a total of 237 households that answered this question, 28.7% were households made up of just one person and there was 1 adult who lived with their parents. Of the rest of the households, there are 63 married couples without children, 81 married couples with children There were 16 single parents with a child or children. There was 1 household that was made up of unrelated people and 7 households that were made up of some sort of institution or another collective housing.

In 2000 there were 51 single family homes (or 52.0% of the total) out of a total of 98 inhabited buildings. There were 27 multi-family buildings (27.6%), along with 13 multi-purpose buildings that were mostly used for housing (13.3%) and 7 other use buildings (commercial or industrial) that also had some housing (7.1%). Of the single family homes 8 were built before 1919, while 1 were built between 1990 and 2000. The greatest number of single family homes (19) were built between 1981 and 1990. The most multi-family homes (8) were built between 1981 and 1990 and the next most (6) were built before 1919. There were 2 multi-family houses built between 1996 and 2000.

In 2000 there were 214 apartments in the municipality. The most common apartment size was 4 rooms of which there were 70. There were 8 single room apartments and 42 apartments with five or more rooms. Of these apartments, a total of 200 apartments (93.5% of the total) were permanently occupied, while 8 apartments (3.7%) were seasonally occupied and 6 apartments (2.8%) were empty. As of 2009, the construction rate of new housing units was 1.6 new units per 1000 residents. The vacancy rate for the municipality, in 2010, was 0%.

The historical population is given in the following chart:

== Politics ==
In the 2007 federal election the most popular party was the SVP which received 33.3% of the vote. The next three most popular parties were the FDP (18.8%), the SP (17.85%) and the Green Party (8.9%). In the federal election, a total of 122 votes were cast, and the voter turnout was 38.7%.

== Economy ==
As of 2010, Rennaz had an unemployment rate of 5.4%. As of 2008, there were 15 people employed in the primary economic sector and about 4 businesses involved in this sector. 1 person was employed in the secondary sector and there was 1 business in this sector. 405 people were employed in the tertiary sector, with 27 businesses in this sector. There were 326 residents of the municipality who were employed in some capacity, of which females made up 44.2% of the workforce.

In 2008 the total number of full-time equivalent jobs was 332. The number of jobs in the primary sector was 13, all of which were in agriculture. The number of jobs in the secondary sector was 1, all of which were in manufacturing. The number of jobs in the tertiary sector was 318. In the tertiary sector; 138 or 43.4% were in wholesale or retail sales or the repair of motor vehicles, 46 or 14.5% were in a hotel or restaurant, 3 or 0.9% were in education.

In 2000, there were 313 workers who commuted into the municipality and 244 workers who commuted away. The municipality is a net importer of workers, with about 1.3 workers entering the municipality for every one leaving. About 4.2% of the workforce coming into Rennaz are coming from outside Switzerland. Of the working population, 13.2% used public transportation to get to work, and 65% used a private car.

== Religion ==
From the 2000 census, 210 or 37.2% were Roman Catholic, while 233 or 41.2% belonged to the Swiss Reformed Church. Of the rest of the population, there were 3 members of an Orthodox church (or about 0.53% of the population), there were 2 individuals (or about 0.35% of the population) who belonged to the Christian Catholic Church, and there were 11 individuals (or about 1.95% of the population) who belonged to another Christian church. There were 32 (or about 5.66% of the population) who were Islamic. There were and 2 individuals who belonged to another church. 57 (or about 10.09% of the population) belonged to no church, are agnostic or atheist, and 15 individuals (or about 2.65% of the population) did not answer the question.

== Education ==
In Rennaz about 261 or (46.2%) of the population have completed non-mandatory upper secondary education, and 54 or (9.6%) have completed additional higher education (either university or a Fachhochschule). Of the 54 who completed tertiary schooling, 50.0% were Swiss men, 27.8% were Swiss women, 14.8% were non-Swiss men.

In the 2009/2010 school year there were a total of 89 students in the Rennaz school district. In the Vaud cantonal school system, two years of non-obligatory pre-school are provided by the political districts. During the school year, the political district provided pre-school care for a total of 205 children of which 96 children (46.8%) received subsidized pre-school care. The canton's primary school program requires students to attend for four years. There were 55 students in the municipal primary school program. The obligatory lower secondary school program lasts for six years and there were 33 students in those schools. There were also 1 students who were home schooled or attended another non-traditional school.

As of 2000, there were 47 students in Rennaz who came from another municipality, while 60 residents attended schools outside the municipality.

== Infrastructure ==
=== Health ===
Since 2019, the intercantonal Riviera-Chablais Hospital, Vaud-Valais is located in the municipality, as well as the Pharmacy of the Eastern Vaud Hospitals.
