= Corbeyrier =

- Municipality
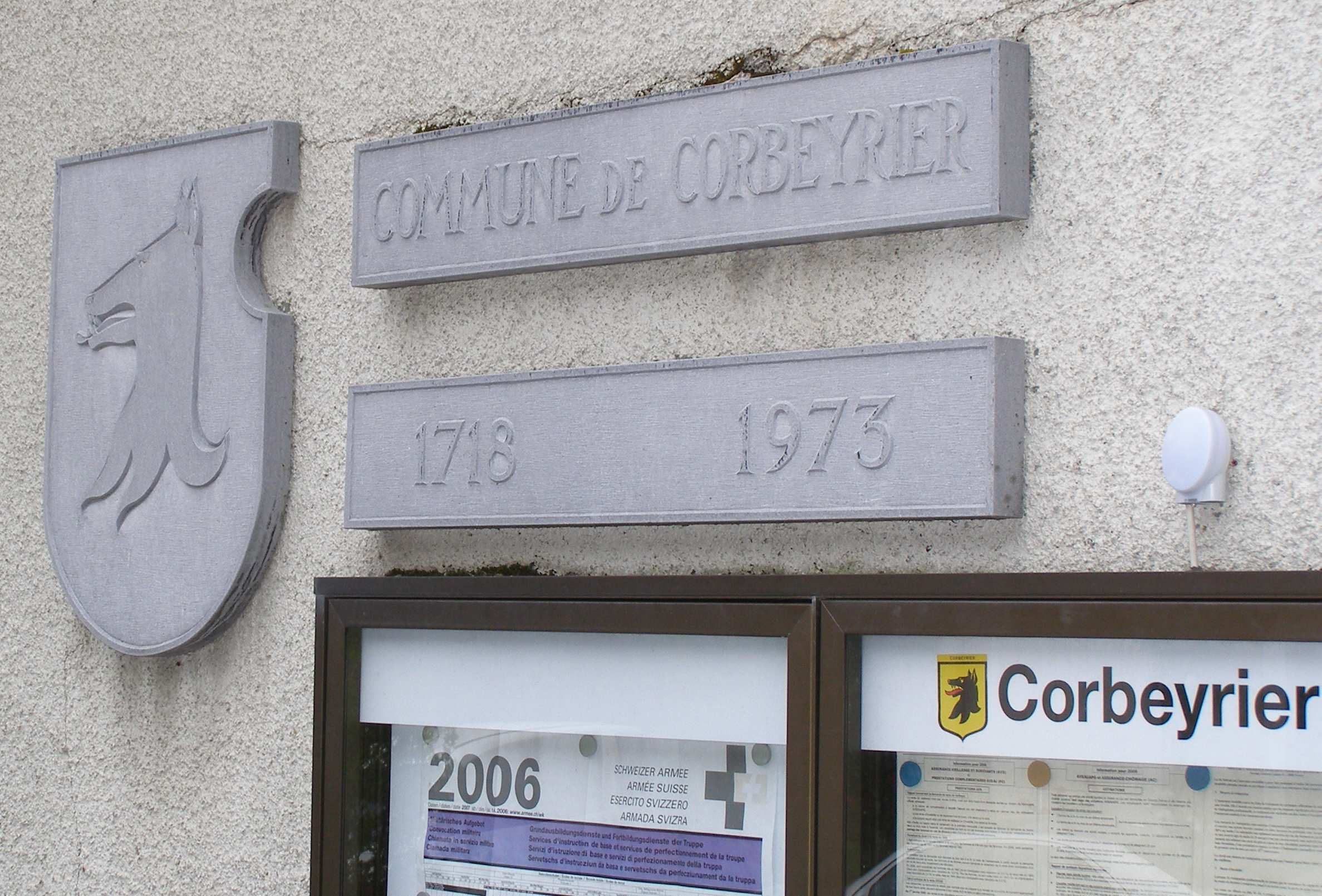
- Municipality of Corbeyrier insignia on the village square

- Flag Coat of arms
- Location of Corbeyrier
- Location within Switzerland Location within Canton of Vaud
- Coordinates: 46°21′N 6°57′E
- Country: Switzerland
- Canton: Vaud
- District: Aigle

Area
  - Total: 21.99 km^{2} (8.49 sq mi)
- Elevation: 929 m (3,048 ft)

Population (2000)
  - Total: 331
  - Density: 15.1/km^{2} (39.0/sq mi)
- Demonym: Les Robaleux/robaleuse
- Time zone: UTC+01:00 (CET)
  - Summer (DST): UTC+02:00 (CEST)
- Postal code: 1856
- SFOS number: 5404
- ISO 3166 code: CH-VD
- Surrounded by: Leysin, Ormont-Dessous, Roche, Villeneuve, Yvorne
- Website: corbeyrier.ch

Corbeyrier is a municipality in Switzerland in the canton of Vaud, located in the district of Aigle. It became a municipality in 1718.

== History ==
Corbeyrier is first mentioned in 1261 as de Cubiriaco.

== Geography ==
Aerial view (1948)

Corbeyrier has an area, as of 2009, of 21.99 square kilometers (8.49 sq mi). Of this area, 7.97 km^{2} (3.08 sq mi) or 36.2% is used for agricultural purposes, while 11.96 km^{2} (4.62 sq mi) or 54.4% is forested. Of the rest of the land, 0.5 km^{2} (0.19 sq mi) or 2.3% is settled (buildings or roads), 0.06 km^{2} (15 acres) or 0.3% is either rivers or lakes and 1.51 km^{2} (0.58 sq mi) or 6.9% is unproductive land.

Of the built up area, housing and buildings made up 1.0% and transportation infrastructure made up 1.2%. Out of the forested land, 47.0% of the total land area is heavily forested and 2.9% is covered with orchards or small clusters of trees. Of the agricultural land, 0.0% is used for growing crops and 5.0% is pastures and 30.8% is used for alpine pastures. All the water in the municipality is in lakes. Of the unproductive areas, 4.6% is unproductive vegetation and 2.2% is too rocky for vegetation.

The municipality is located in the Aigle district, on the right bank of Rhone river. The municipality stretches from the upper end of the vineyard of Yvorne to the alpine pastures of the Eau-Froide and Petit-Hongrin valleys. It consists of the village of Corbeyrier and the hamlets of Boveau, Luan, Le Crettex and Vers Cort.

== Coat of arms ==
The blazon of the municipal coat of arms is Or, a Wolf Head Sable, langued Gules.

== Demographics ==
Corbeyrier has a population (as of December 2020) of 445. As of 2008, 8.0% of the population are resident foreign nationals. Over the last 10 years (1999–2009) the population has changed at a rate of 8.6%. It has changed at a rate of 29.4% due to migration and at a rate of -20.2% due to births and deaths.

Most of the population (as of 2000) speaks French (323 or 93.1%), with German being second most common (13 or 3.7%) and Italian being third (4 or 1.2%).

Of the population in the municipality 90 or about 25.9% were born in Corbeyrier and lived there in 2000. There were 134 or 38.6% who were born in the same canton, while 63 or 18.2% were born somewhere else in Switzerland, and 41 or 11.8% were born outside of Switzerland. In

2008 there was 1 live birth to Swiss citizens and were 8 deaths of Swiss citizens and 1 non-Swiss citizen death. Ignoring immigration and emigration, the population of Swiss citizens decreased by 7 while the foreign population decreased by 1. There was 1 non-Swiss man and 1 non-Swiss woman who emigrated from Switzerland to another country. The total Swiss population change in 2008 (from all sources, including moves across municipal borders) was an increase of 3 and the non-Swiss population increased by 3 people. This represents a population growth rate of 1.6%.

The age distribution, as of 2009, in Corbeyrier is; 27 children or 7.2% of the population are between 0 and 9 years old and 42 teenagers or 11.2% are between 10 and 19. Of the adult population, 32 people or 8.5% of the population are between 20 and 29 years old. 56 people or 14.9% are between 30 and 39, 38 people or 10.1% are between 40 and 49, and 36 people or 9.6% are between 50 and 59. The senior population distribution is 60 people or 16.0% of the population are between 60 and 69 years old, 62 people or 16.5% are between 70 and 79, there are 22 people or 5.9% who are 80 and 89, and there is 1 person who is 90 and older.

As of 2000, there were 106 people who were single and never married in the municipality. There were 167 married individuals, 41 widows or widowers and 33 individuals who are divorced.

As of 2000, there were 148 private households in the municipality, and an average of 2. persons per household. There were 57 households that consist of only one person and 5 households with five or more people. Out of a total of 154 households that answered this question, 37.0% were households made up of just one person. Of the rest of the households, there are 55 married couples without children, 33 married couples with children There was one single parent with a child or children. There were 2 households that were made up of unrelated people and 6 households that were made up of some sort of institution or another collective housing.

In 2000 there were 155 single family homes (or 71.8% of the total) out of a total of 216 inhabited buildings. There were 26 multi-family buildings (12.0%), along with 22 multi-purpose buildings that were mostly used for housing (10.2%) and 13 other use buildings (commercial or industrial) that also had some housing (6.0%). Of the single family homes 49 were built before 1919, while 9 were built between 1990 and 2000. The most multi-family homes (13) were built before 1919 and the next most (4) were built between 1981 and 1990.

In 2000 there were 257 apartments in the municipality. The most common apartment size was 3 rooms of which there were 70. There were 20 single room apartments and 71 apartments with five or more rooms. Of these apartments, a total of 142 apartments (55.3% of the total) were permanently occupied, while 91 apartments (35.4%) were seasonally occupied and 24 apartments (9.3%) were empty. As of 2009, the construction rate of new housing units was 2.7 new units per 1000 residents. The vacancy rate for the municipality, in 2010, was 0%.

The historical population is given in the following chart:

== Politics ==
In the 2007 federal election the most popular party was the SVP which received 37.77% of the vote. The next three most popular parties were the SP (12.51%), the Green Party (12.09%) and the FDP (11.96%). In the federal election, a total of 139 votes were cast, and the voter turnout was 49.6%.

== Economy ==
As of 2010, Corbeyrier had an unemployment rate of 3.8%. As of 2008, there were 20 people employed in the primary economic sector and about 3 businesses involved in this sector. 19 people were employed in the secondary sector and there were 3 businesses in this sector. 107 people were employed in the tertiary sector, with 7 businesses in this sector. There were 148 residents of the municipality who were employed in some capacity, of which females made up 47.3% of the workforce.

In 2008 the total number of full-time equivalent jobs was 114. The number of jobs in the primary sector was 14, of which 6 were in agriculture and 8 were in forestry or lumber production. The number of jobs in the secondary sector was 18 of which 4 or (22.2%) were in manufacturing and 14 (77.8%) were in construction. The number of jobs in the tertiary sector was 82. In the tertiary sector; 5 or 6.1% were in a hotel or restaurant, 21 or 25.6% were in education and 53 or 64.6% were in health care.

In 2000, there were 78 workers who commuted into the municipality and 78 workers who commuted away. The municipality is a net exporter of workers, with about 1.0 workers leaving the municipality for every one entering. Of the working population, 6.1% used public transportation to get to work, and 64.2% used a private car.

== Religion ==
From the 2000 census, 70 or 20.2% were Roman Catholic, while 212 or 61.1% belonged to the Swiss Reformed Church. Of the rest of the population, there was 1 individual who belongs to the Christian Catholic Church, and there were 7 individuals (or about 2.02% of the population) who belonged to another Christian church. There were 2 individuals who were Hindu. 43 (or about 12.39% of the population) belonged to no church, are agnostic or atheist, and 12 individuals (or about 3.46% of the population) did not answer the question.

== Education ==
In Corbeyrier about 124 or (35.7%) of the population have completed non-mandatory upper secondary education, and 42 or (12.1%) have completed additional higher education (either university or a Fachhochschule). Of the 42 who completed tertiary schooling, 50.0% were Swiss men, 19.0% were Swiss women, 16.7% were non-Swiss men and 14.3% were non-Swiss women.

In the 2009/2010 school year there were a total of 23 students in the Corbeyrier school district. In the Vaud cantonal school system, two years of non-obligatory pre-school are provided by the political districts. During the school year, the district provided pre-school care for a total of 205 children of which 96 children (46.8%) received subsidized pre-school care. There were 19 students in the primary school program, which lasts four years. The obligatory lower secondary school program lasts for six years and there were 4 students in those schools.

As of 2000, there were 4 students in Corbeyrier who came from another municipality, while 28 residents attended schools outside the municipality.
