= Yvorne =

- Municipality
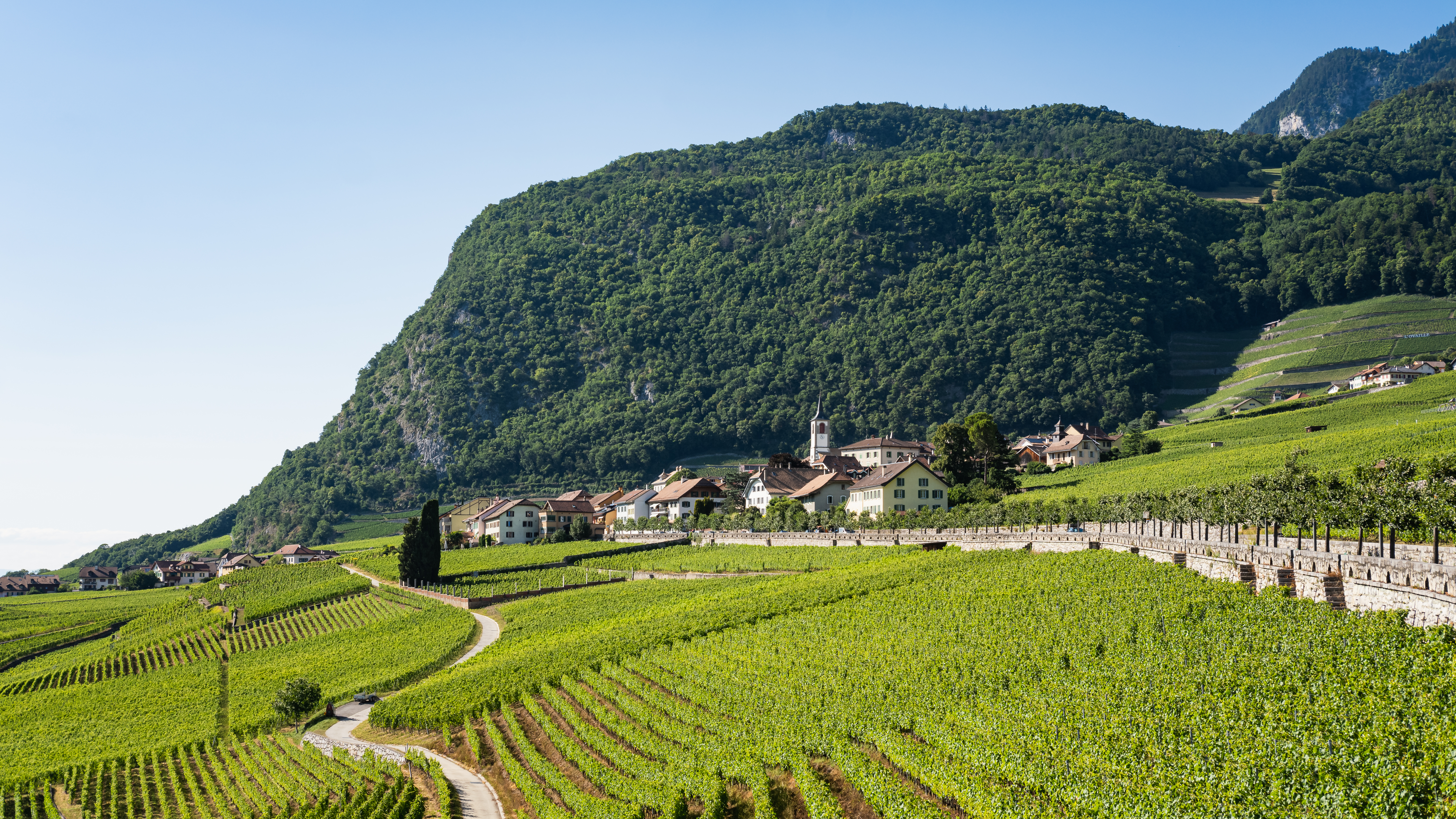
- Yvorne village

- Flag Coat of arms
- Location of Yvorne
- Location within Switzerland Location within Canton of Vaud
- Coordinates: 46°20′N 6°57′E
- Country: Switzerland
- Canton: Vaud
- District: Aigle

Government
  - Mayor: Syndic

Area
  - Total: 12.2 km^{2} (4.7 sq mi)
- Elevation: 454 m (1,490 ft)

Population (January 2007)
  - Total: 926
  - Density: 75.9/km^{2} (197/sq mi)
- Time zone: UTC+01:00 (CET)
  - Summer (DST): UTC+02:00 (CEST)
- Postal code: 1853
- SFOS number: 5415
- ISO 3166 code: CH-VD
- Surrounded by: Aigle, Chessel, Corbeyrier, Leysin, Roche, Vouvry (VS)
- Website: yvorne.ch

Yvorne is a municipality of the canton of Vaud in Switzerland, located in the district of Aigle.

== Geography ==
Aerial view (1952)

Yvorne has an area, as of 2009, of 12.2 square kilometers (4.7 sq mi). Of this area, 5.79 km^{2} (2.24 sq mi) or 47.5% is used for agricultural purposes, while 4.83 km^{2} (1.86 sq mi) or 39.6% is forested. Of the rest of the land, 1.18 km^{2} (0.46 sq mi) or 9.7% is settled (buildings or roads), 0.34 km^{2} (0.13 sq mi) or 2.8% is either rivers or lakes and 0.07 km^{2} (17 acres) or 0.6% is unproductive land.

Of the built up area, housing and buildings made up 2.4% and transportation infrastructure made up 4.9%. while parks, green belts and sports fields made up 1.5%. Out of the forested land, all of the forested land area is covered with heavy forests. Of the agricultural land, 29.1% is used for growing crops and 2.5% is pastures, while 15.9% is used for orchards or vine crops. Of the water in the municipality, 1.2% is in lakes and 1.6% is in rivers and streams.

Yvorne is a vine-growing area and produces a noted white wine.

== Coat of arms ==
The blazon of the municipal coat of arms is Per fess, 1. Or, a letter Y Sable, 2. Sable, a Grape Bunch Or..

== Demographics ==
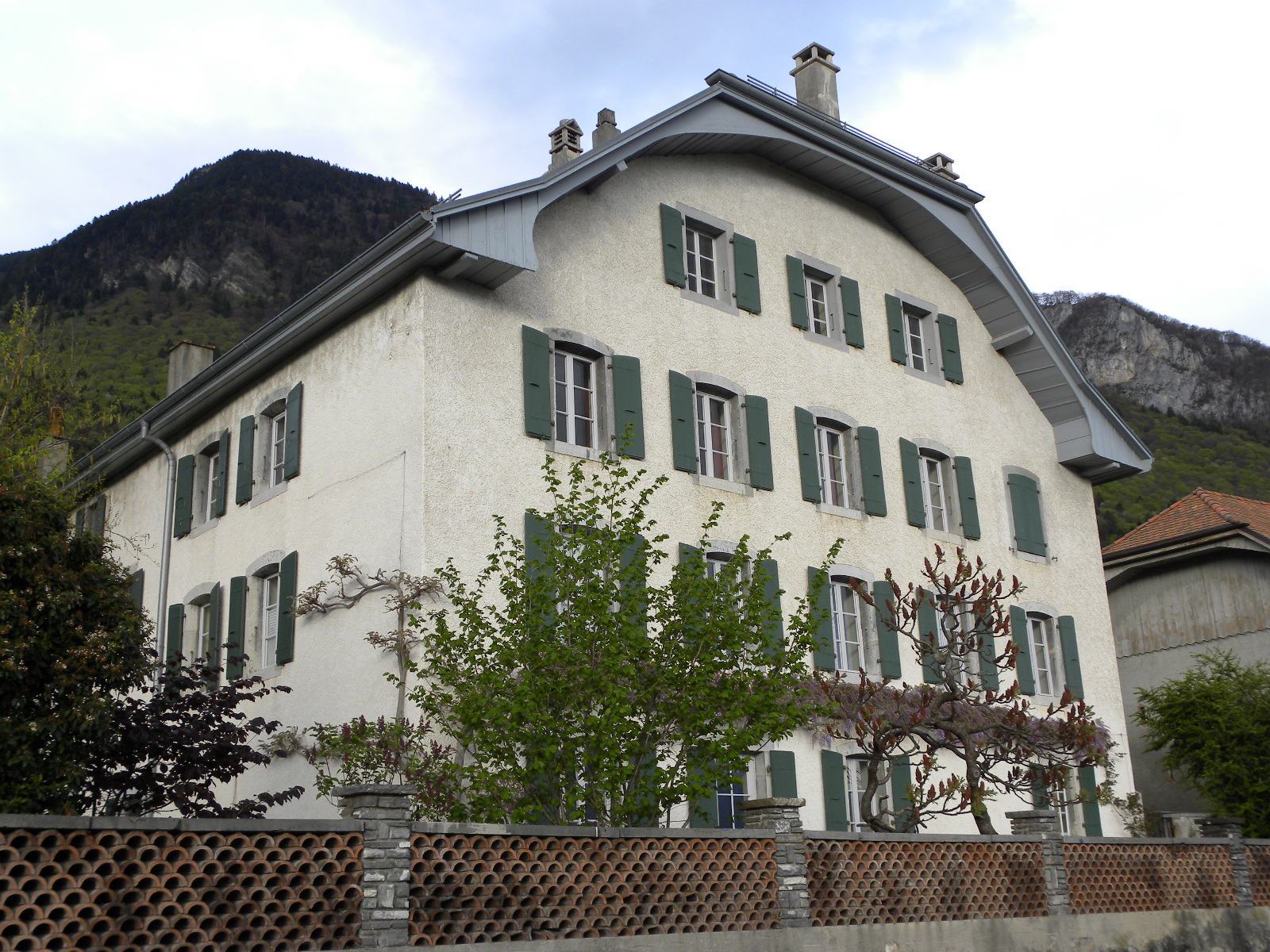
House of Auguste Forel in Yvorne

Yvorne has a population (as of December 2020) of 1,070. As of 2008, 12.1% of the population are resident foreign nationals. Over the last 10 years (1999–2009) the population has changed at a rate of 0.3%. It has changed at a rate of 0.8% due to migration and at a rate of -0.8% due to births and deaths.

Most of the population (as of 2000) speaks French (873 or 90.7%), with German being second most common (34 or 3.5%) and Italian being third (19 or 2.0%).

Of the population in the municipality 324 or about 33.7% were born in Yvorne and lived there in 2000. There were 328 or 34.1% who were born in the same canton, while 141 or 14.7% were born somewhere else in Switzerland, and 142 or 14.8% were born outside of Switzerland.

In 2008 there were 7 live births to Swiss citizens and 2 births to non-Swiss citizens, and in same time span there were 4 deaths of Swiss citizens and 1 non-Swiss citizen death. Ignoring immigration and emigration, the population of Swiss citizens increased by 3 while the foreign population increased by 1. There was 1 Swiss man who immigrated back to Switzerland. At the same time, there were 2 non-Swiss men who immigrated from another country to Switzerland and 3 non-Swiss women who emigrated from Switzerland to another country. The total Swiss population change in 2008 (from all sources, including moves across municipal borders) was an increase of 24 and the non-Swiss population decreased by 9 people. This represents a population growth rate of 1.6%.

The age distribution, as of 2009, in Yvorne is; 102 children or 10.5% of the population are between 0 and 9 years old and 94 teenagers or 9.7% are between 10 and 19. Of the adult population, 119 people or 12.3% of the population are between 20 and 29 years old. 145 people or 15.0% are between 30 and 39, 138 people or 14.3% are between 40 and 49, and 146 people or 15.1% are between 50 and 59. The senior population distribution is 115 people or 11.9% of the population are between 60 and 69 years old, 57 people or 5.9% are between 70 and 79, there are 44 people or 4.5% who are 80 and 89, and there are 8 people or 0.8% who are 90 and older.

As of 2000, there were 369 people who were single and never married in the municipality. There were 499 married individuals, 52 widows or widowers and 42 individuals who are divorced.

As of 2000, there were 402 private households in the municipality, and an average of 2.3 persons per household. There were 126 households that consist of only one person and 19 households with five or more people. Out of a total of 413 households that answered this question, 30.5% were households made up of just one person and there were 4 adults who lived with their parents. Of the rest of the households, there are 119 married couples without children, 135 married couples with children. There were 13 single parents with a child or children. There were 5 households that were made up of unrelated people and 11 households that were made up of some sort of institution or another collective housing.

In 2000 there were 140 single family homes (or 51.1% of the total) out of a total of 274 inhabited buildings. There were 49 multi-family buildings (17.9%), along with 65 multi-purpose buildings that were mostly used for housing (23.7%) and 20 other use buildings (commercial or industrial) that also had some housing (7.3%). Of the single family homes 64 were built before 1919, while 8 were built between 1990 and 2000. The most multi-family homes (26) were built before 1919 and the next most (5) were built between 1961 and 1970. There was 1 multi-family house built between 1996 and 2000.

In 2000 there were 413 apartments in the municipality. The most common apartment size was 3 rooms of which there were 116. There were 12 single room apartments and 125 apartments with five or more rooms. Of these apartments, a total of 354 apartments (85.7% of the total) were permanently occupied, while 35 apartments (8.5%) were seasonally occupied and 24 apartments (5.8%) were empty. As of 2009, the construction rate of new housing units was 1 new units per 1000 residents. The vacancy rate for the municipality, in 2010, was 0%.

The historical population is given in the following chart:

== Politics ==
In the 2007 federal election the most popular party was the FDP which received 23.94% of the vote. The next three most popular parties were the SVP (22.37%), the LPS Party (15.74%) and the SP (13.11%). In the federal election, a total of 292 votes were cast, and the voter turnout was 44.1%.

== Economy ==
As of 2010, Yvorne had an unemployment rate of 2.7%. As of 2008, there were 190 people employed in the primary economic sector and about 41 businesses involved in this sector. 39 people were employed in the secondary sector and there were 10 businesses in this sector. 167 people were employed in the tertiary sector, with 31 businesses in this sector. There were 509 residents of the municipality who were employed in some capacity, of which females made up 39.9% of the workforce.

In 2008 the total number of full-time equivalent jobs was 313. The number of jobs in the primary sector was 128, all of which were in agriculture. The number of jobs in the secondary sector was 37 of which 27 or (73.0%) were in manufacturing and 10 (27.0%) were in construction. The number of jobs in the tertiary sector was 148. In the tertiary sector; 66 or 44.6% were in wholesale or retail sales or the repair of motor vehicles, 3 or 2.0% were in the movement and storage of goods, 51 or 34.5% were in a hotel or restaurant, 3 or 2.0% were technical professionals or scientists, 5 or 3.4% were in education and 8 or 5.4% were in health care.

In 2000, there were 253 workers who commuted into the municipality and 346 workers who commuted away. The municipality is a net exporter of workers, with about 1.4 workers leaving the municipality for every one entering. About 7.5% of the workforce coming into Yvorne are coming from outside Switzerland. Of the working population, 13.6% used public transportation to get to work, and 61.1% used a private car.

== Religion ==
From the 2000 census, 267 or 27.8% were Roman Catholic, while 524 or 54.5% belonged to the Swiss Reformed Church. Of the rest of the population, there was 1 member of an Orthodox church who belonged, and there were 16 individuals (or about 1.66% of the population) who belonged to another Christian church. There were 9 (or about 0.94% of the population) who were Islamic. There were and 3 individuals who belonged to another church. 110 (or about 11.43% of the population) belonged to no church, are agnostic or atheist, and 32 individuals (or about 3.33% of the population) did not answer the question.

== Education ==
In Yvorne about 364 or (37.8%) of the population have completed non-mandatory upper secondary education, and 107 or (11.1%) have completed additional higher education (either university or a Fachhochschule). Of the 107 who completed tertiary schooling, 59.8% were Swiss men, 23.4% were Swiss women, 10.3% were non-Swiss men and 6.5% were non-Swiss women.

In the 2009/2010 school year there were a total of 82 students in the Yvorne school district. In the Vaud cantonal school system, two years of non-obligatory pre-school are provided by the political districts. During the school year, the political district provided pre-school care for a total of 205 children of which 96 children (46.8%) received subsidized pre-school care. The canton's primary school program requires students to attend for four years. There were 45 students in the municipal primary school program. The obligatory lower secondary school program lasts for six years and there were 36 students in those schools. There were also 1 students who were home schooled or attended another non-traditional school.

As of 2000, there were 421 students in Yvorne who came from another municipality, while 76 residents attended schools outside the municipality.
