= Villeneuve, Vaud =

Villeneuve
- Municipality
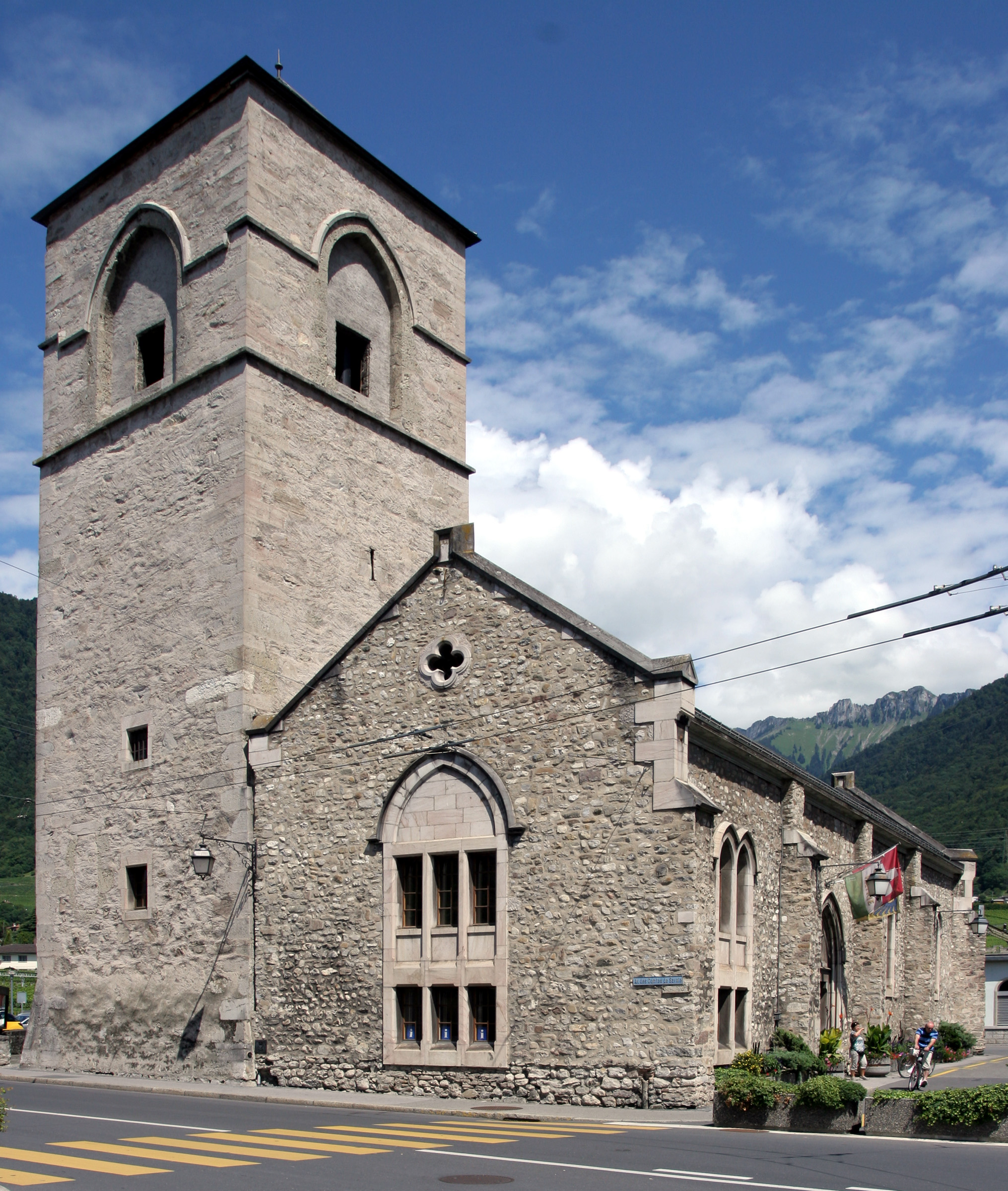
- Villeneuve city hall

- Flag Coat of arms
- Location of Villeneuve
- Location within Switzerland Location within Canton of Vaud
- Coordinates: 46°23′47″N 06°55′30″E
- Country: Switzerland
- Canton: Vaud
- District: Aigle

Government
  - Mayor: Patricia Dominique Lachat SPS/PSS

Area
  - Total: 32.04 km^{2} (12.37 sq mi)
- Elevation: 375 m (1,230 ft)

Population (2000)
  - Total: 4,156
  - Density: 129.7/km^{2} (336.0/sq mi)
- Demonym: Les Villeneuvois
- Time zone: UTC+01:00 (CET)
  - Summer (DST): UTC+02:00 (CEST)
- Postal code: 1844
- SFOS number: 5414
- ISO 3166 code: CH-VD
- Surrounded by: Montreux, Veytaux, Rossinière, Château-d'Œx, Corbeyrier, La Tour-de-Peilz, Noville, Ormont-Dessous, Rennaz, Roche
- Website: villeneuve.ch

Villeneuve (French pronunciation: [vilnœv]; Arpitan: Velanôva) is a municipality of the canton of Vaud in Switzerland, located in the district of Aigle. As of December 2018, it had a population of 5771.

== Geography ==
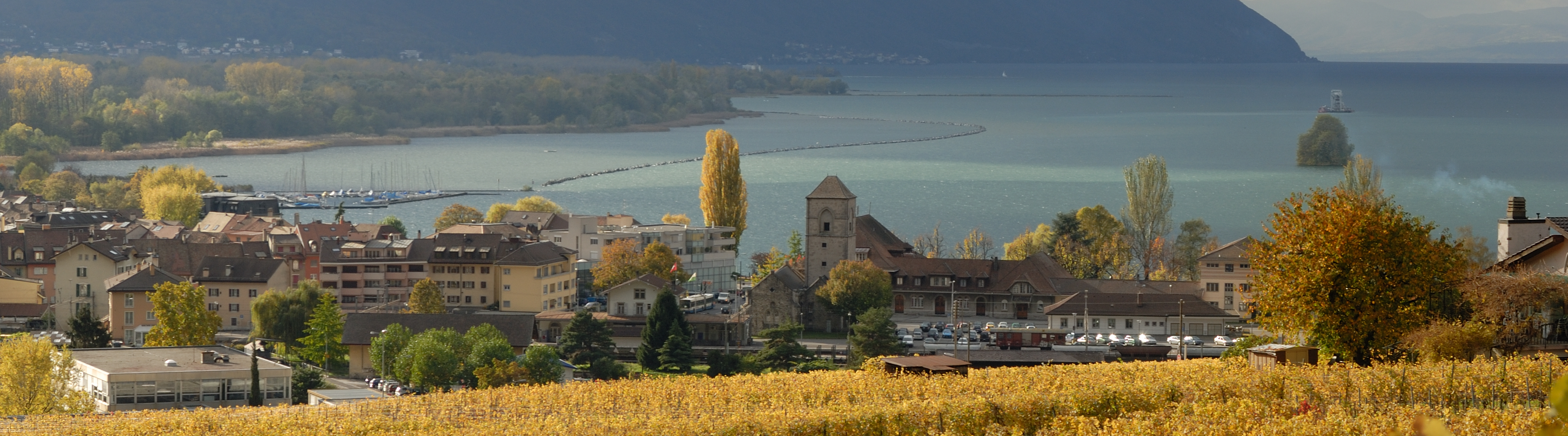
Villeneuve

Aerial view (1962)

Villeneuve has an area, as of 2009, of 32.04 square kilometers (12.37 sq mi). Of this area, 8.56 km^{2} (3.31 sq mi) or 26.7% is used for agricultural purposes, while 17.69 km^{2} (6.83 sq mi) or 55.2% is forested. Of the rest of the land, 2.63 km^{2} (1.02 sq mi) or 8.2% is settled (buildings or roads), 0.17 km^{2} (0.066 sq mi) or 0.5% is either rivers or lakes and 3.08 km^{2} (1.19 sq mi) or 9.6% is unproductive land.

Of the built up area, industrial buildings made up 1.5% of the total area while housing and buildings made up 1.9% and transportation infrastructure made up 2.8%. Power and water infrastructure as well as other special developed areas made up 1.7% of the area Out of the forested land, 50.9% of the total land area is heavily forested and 2.6% is covered with orchards or small clusters of trees. Of the agricultural land, 0.9% is used for growing crops, while 2.3% is used for orchards or vine crops and 22.5% is used for alpine pastures. All the water in the municipality is flowing water. Of the unproductive areas, 6.7% is unproductive vegetation and 2.9% is too rocky for vegetation.

== Coat of arms ==
The blazon of the municipal coat of arms is Or, an Eagle displayed Azure.

== Demographics ==
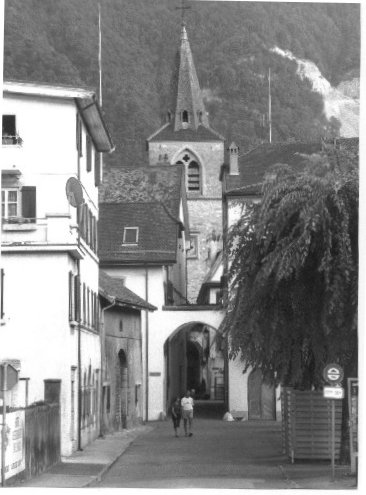
Villeneuve

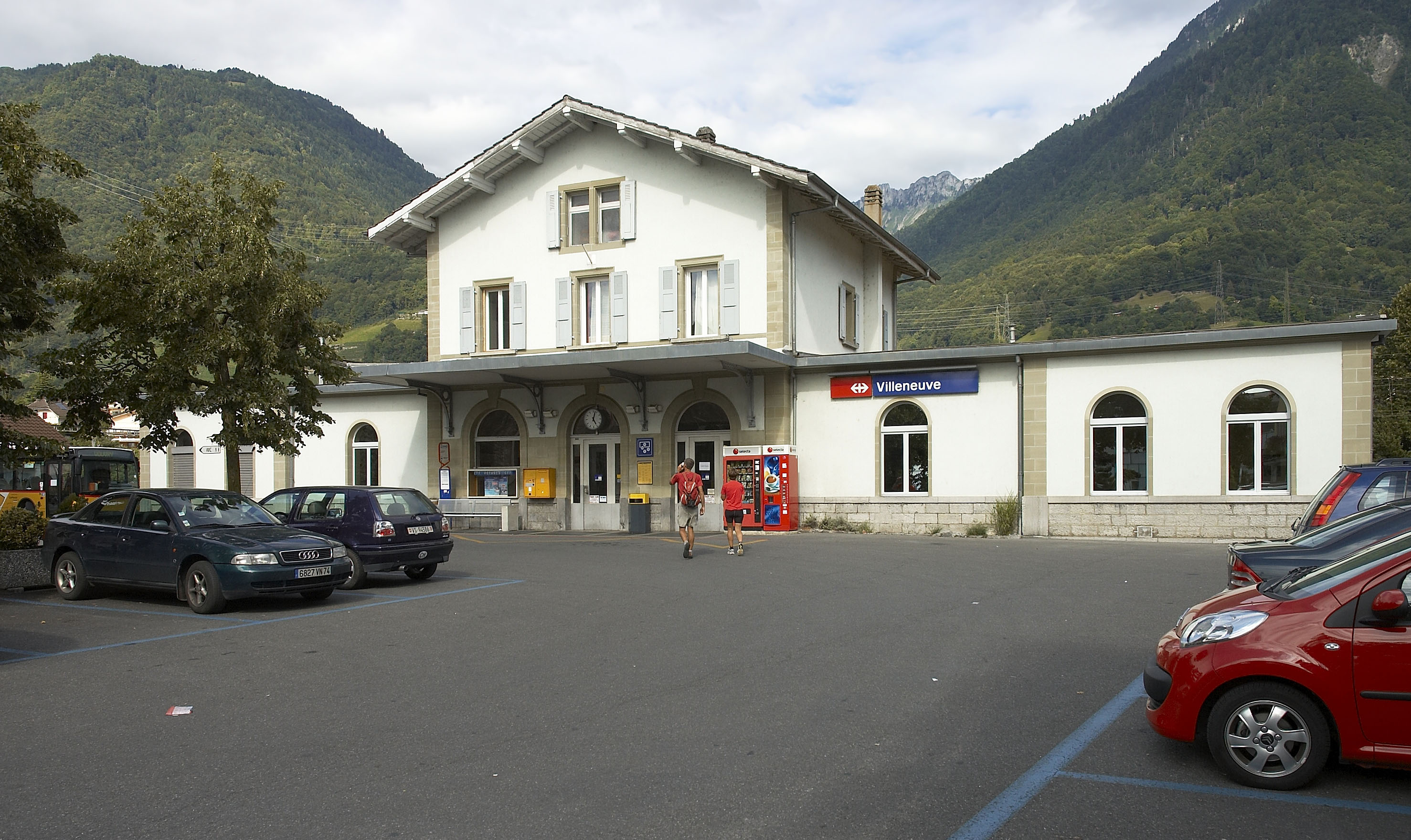
Train and bus station in Villeneuve

Villeneuve has a population (as of December 2020) of 5,834. As of 2008, 36.2% of the population are resident foreign nationals. Over the last 10 years (1999–2009) the population has changed at a rate of 17.7%. It has changed at a rate of 16.7% due to migration and at a rate of 1.9% due to births and deaths.

Most of the population (as of 2000) speaks French (3,321 or 79.4%), with German being second most common (198 or 4.7%) and Italian being third (171 or 4.1%).

Of the population in the municipality 924 or about 22.1% were born in Villeneuve and lived there in 2000. There were 1,062 or 25.4% who were born in the same canton, while 693 or 16.6% were born somewhere else in Switzerland, and 1,294 or 31.0% were born outside of Switzerland.

In 2008 there were 26 live births to Swiss citizens and 21 births to non-Swiss citizens, and in same time span there were 34 deaths of Swiss citizens and 5 non-Swiss citizen deaths. Ignoring immigration and emigration, the population of Swiss citizens decreased by 8 while the foreign population increased by 16. There was 1 Swiss man who emigrated from Switzerland. At the same time, there were 33 non-Swiss men and 39 non-Swiss women who immigrated from another country to Switzerland. The total Swiss population change in 2008 (from all sources, including moves across municipal borders) was an increase of 104 and the non-Swiss population increased by 45 people. This represents a population growth rate of 3.4%.

The age distribution, as of 2009, in Villeneuve is; 490 children or 10.4% of the population are between 0 and 9 years old and 597 teenagers or 12.7% are between 10 and 19. Of the adult population, 595 people or 12.6% of the population are between 20 and 29 years old. 561 people or 11.9% are between 30 and 39, 741 people or 15.7% are between 40 and 49, and 645 people or 13.7% are between 50 and 59. The senior population distribution is 512 people or 10.8% of the population are between 60 and 69 years old, 353 people or 7.5% are between 70 and 79, there are 192 people or 4.1% who are 80 and 89, and there are 33 people or 0.7% who are 90 and older.

As of 2000, there were 1,600 people who were single and never married in the municipality. There were 2,078 married individuals, 263 widows or widowers and 239 individuals who are divorced.

As of 2000, there were 1,810 private households in the municipality, and an average of 2.3 persons per household. There were 652 households that consist of only one person and 96 households with five or more people. Out of a total of 1,852 households that answered this question, 35.2% were households made up of just one person and there were 7 adults who lived with their parents. Of the rest of the households, there are 459 married couples without children, 551 married couples with children. There were 116 single parents with a child or children. There were 25 households that were made up of unrelated people and 42 households that were made up of some sort of institution or another collective housing.

In 2000 there were 374 single family homes (or 49.4% of the total) out of a total of 757 inhabited buildings. There were 227 multi-family buildings (30.0%), along with 84 multi-purpose buildings that were mostly used for housing (11.1%) and 72 other use buildings (commercial or industrial) that also had some housing (9.5%). Of the single family homes 73 were built before 1919, while 65 were built between 1990 and 2000. The most multi-family homes (63) were built before 1919 and the next most (44) were built between 1961 and 1970. There were 7 multi-family houses built between 1996 and 2000.

In 2000 there were 2,268 apartments in the municipality. The most common apartment size was 3 rooms of which there were 731. There were 165 single room apartments and 352 apartments with five or more rooms. Of these apartments, a total of 1,712 apartments (75.5% of the total) were permanently occupied, while 450 apartments (19.8%) were seasonally occupied and 106 apartments (4.7%) were empty. As of 2009, the construction rate of new housing units was 8 new units per 1000 residents. The vacancy rate for the municipality, in 2010, was 0.81%.

The historical population is given in the following chart:

== Sights ==
The entire small city/town of Villeneuve is designated as part of the Inventory of Swiss Heritage Sites.

== Politics ==
In the 2007 federal election the most popular party was the SVP which received 30.32% of the vote. The next three most popular parties were the FDP (24.04%), the SP (21.06%) and the Green Party (7.06%). In the federal election, a total of 856 votes were cast, and the voter turnout was 37.6%.

== Economy ==
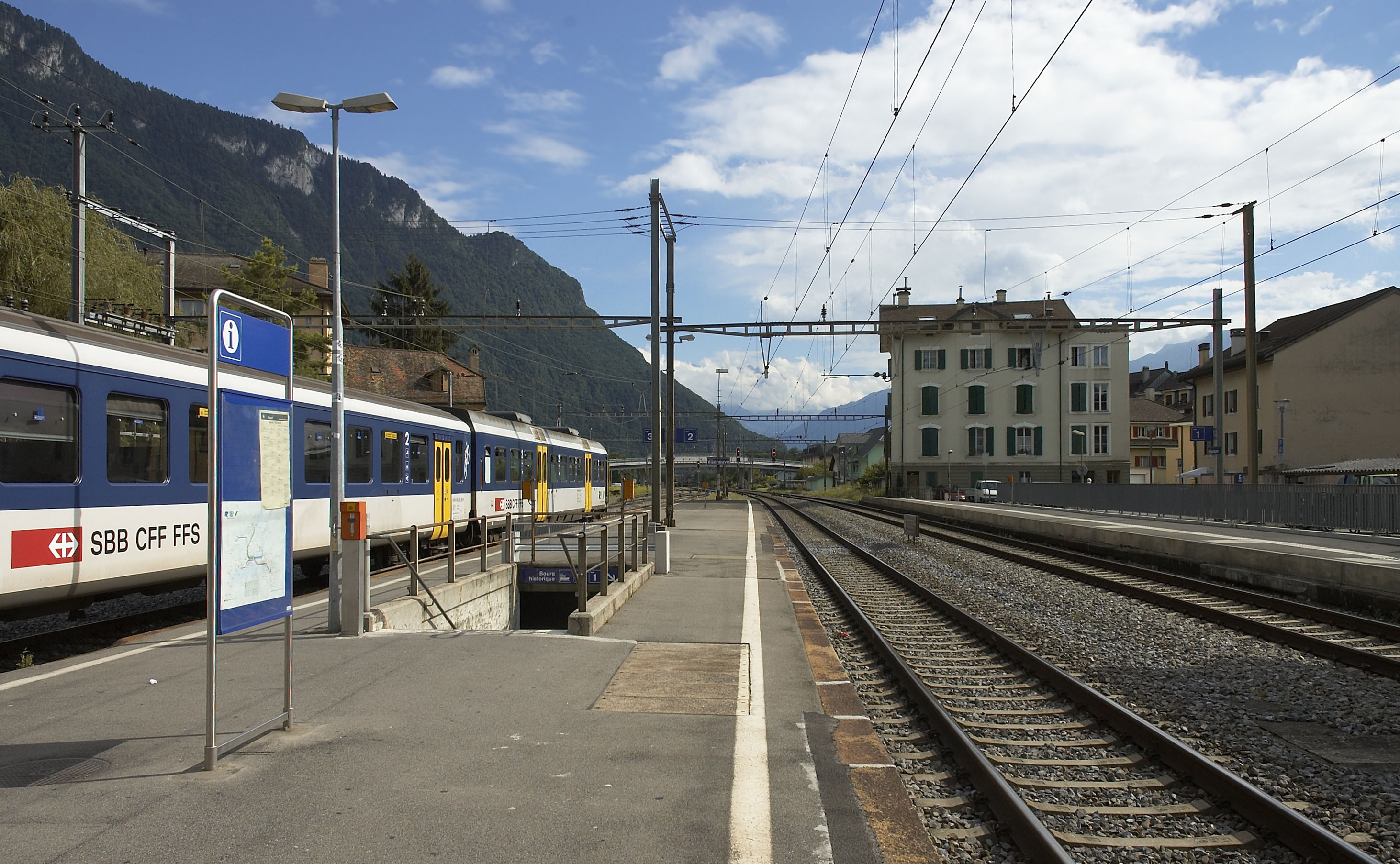
Villeneuve train station

As of 2010, Villeneuve had an unemployment rate of 7.6%. As of 2008, there were 72 people employed in the primary economic sector and about 16 businesses involved in this sector. 971 people were employed in the secondary sector and there were 64 businesses in this sector. 1,474 people were employed in the tertiary sector, with 198 businesses in this sector. There were 1,995 residents of the municipality who were employed in some capacity, of which females made up 43.1% of the workforce.

In 2008 the total number of full-time equivalent jobs was 2,241. The number of jobs in the primary sector was 44, of which 39 were in agriculture and 5 were in forestry or lumber production. The number of jobs in the secondary sector was 937 of which 757 or (80.8%) were in manufacturing, 28 or (3.0%) were in mining and 124 (13.2%) were in construction. The number of jobs in the tertiary sector was 1,260. In the tertiary sector; 739 or 58.7% were in wholesale or retail sales or the repair of motor vehicles, 102 or 8.1% were in the movement and storage of goods, 101 or 8.0% were in a hotel or restaurant, 9 or 0.7% were in the information industry, 9 or 0.7% were the insurance or financial industry, 27 or 2.1% were technical professionals or scientists, 64 or 5.1% were in education and 91 or 7.2% were in health care.

In 2000, there were 1,633 workers who commuted into the municipality and 1,178 workers who commuted away. The municipality is a net importer of workers, with about 1.4 workers entering the municipality for every one leaving. About 7.5% of the workforce coming into Villeneuve are coming from outside Switzerland. Of the working population, 19.8% used public transportation to get to work, and 51.8% used a private car.

== Religion ==
From the 2000 census, 1,683 or 40.3% were Roman Catholic, while 1,368 or 32.7% belonged to the Swiss Reformed Church. Of the rest of the population, there were 126 members of an Orthodox church (or about 3.01% of the population), there was 1 individual who belongs to the Christian Catholic Church, and there were 68 individuals (or about 1.63% of the population) who belonged to another Christian church. There was 1 individual who was Jewish, and 300 (or about 7.18% of the population) who were Islamic. There were 6 individuals who were Buddhist, 4 individuals who were Hindu and 10 individuals who belonged to another church. 327 (or about 7.82% of the population) belonged to no church, are agnostic or atheist, and 286 individuals (or about 6.84% of the population) did not answer the question.

== Education ==
In Villeneuve about 1,350 or (32.3%) of the population have completed non-mandatory upper secondary education, and 381 or (9.1%) have completed additional higher education (either university or a Fachhochschule). Of the 381 who completed tertiary schooling, 49.3% were Swiss men, 26.8% were Swiss women, 15.7% were non-Swiss men and 8.1% were non-Swiss women.

In the 2009/2010 school year there were a total of 615 students in the Villeneuve school district. In the Vaud cantonal school system, two years of non-obligatory pre-school are provided by the political districts. During the school year, the political district provided pre-school care for a total of 205 children of which 96 children (46.8%) received subsidized pre-school care. The canton's primary school program requires students to attend for four years. There were 328 students in the municipal primary school program. The obligatory lower secondary school program lasts for six years and there were 269 students in those schools. There were also 18 students who were home schooled or attended another non-traditional school.

As of 2000, there were 101 students in Villeneuve who came from another municipality, while 237 residents attended schools outside the municipality.

== Transportation ==
The municipality has a railway station, Villeneuve VD, on the Simplon line. It has regular service to Grandson, Lausanne, and Aigle.

== Notable residents ==
- Romain Rolland (1866–1944) a French dramatist, novelist, essayist, art historian and mystic who was awarded the Nobel Prize for Literature in 1915; lived in Villeneuve between the Wars, where he met Mahatma Gandhi
- Oskar Kokoschka (1886–1980) an Austrian artist, poet and playwright best known for his intense expressionistic portraits and landscapes; settled in Switzerland after WW2
- Henry James, his sister Alice James and their Aunt Kate, in the summer of 1872, arrived at the Hotel Byron looking forward to several weeks of Swiss tranquillity. The stay however was cut short by a period of torrid weather.
