= Chessel =

- Municipality
- Flag Coat of arms
- Location of Chessel
- Location within Switzerland Location within Canton of Vaud
- Coordinates: 46°21′N 6°53′E
- Country: Switzerland
- Canton: Vaud
- District: Aigle

Government
  - Mayor: Syndic; Gérald Yersin

Area
  - Total: 3.57 km^{2} (1.38 sq mi)
- Elevation: 378 m (1,240 ft)

Population (2000)
  - Total: 316
  - Density: 88.5/km^{2} (229/sq mi)
- Time zone: UTC+01:00 (CET)
  - Summer (DST): UTC+02:00 (CEST)
- Postal code: 1846
- SFOS number: 5403
- ISO 3166 code: CH-VD
- Surrounded by: Noville, Port-Valais (VS), Roche, Vouvry (VS), Yvorne
- Website: chessel.ch

Chessel (French pronunciation: [ʃəsɛl]) is a municipality in the canton of Vaud in Switzerland, located in the district of Aigle.

== History ==
Chessel is first mentioned in 1364 as Chessey.

== Geography ==
Chessel has an area, as of 2009, of 3.57 square kilometers (1.38 sq mi). Of this area, 2.2 km^{2} (0.85 sq mi) or 61.6% is used for agricultural purposes, while 0.74 km^{2} (0.29 sq mi) or 20.7% is forested. Of the rest of the land, 0.39 km^{2} (0.15 sq mi) or 10.9% is settled (buildings or roads), 0.22 km^{2} (0.085 sq mi) or 6.2% is either rivers or lakes.

Of the built up area, housing and buildings made up 3.9% and transportation infrastructure made up 2.8%. while parks, green belts and sports fields made up 3.6%. Out of the forested land, 19.6% of the total land area is heavily forested and 1.1% is covered with orchards or small clusters of trees. Of the agricultural land, 54.1% is used for growing crops and 5.9% is pastures, while 1.7% is used for orchards or vine crops. All the water in the municipality is flowing water.

The municipality is located in the Aigle district, on the right bank of the Rhone river.

== Coat of arms ==
The blazon of the municipal coat of arms was originally D'or à la fasce ondée d'azur, symbolizing the Rhône which runs through Chessel. In 1926, the communal authorities placed a crescent in the higher part of the flag: this represented the old "Café de la Turquie" (Café of Turkey) and was removed in 1958. The Council of State of the Canton of Vaud has accepted a request in 2004 to place the crescent back on the flag.

== Demographics ==
Chessel has a population (as of December 2020) of 444. As of 2008, 7.6% of the population are resident foreign nationals. Over the last 10 years (1999–2009 ) the population has changed at a rate of 12.4%. It has changed at a rate of 5.2% due to migration and at a rate of 8.2% due to births and deaths.

Most of the population (as of 2000) speaks French (285 or 90.8%), with English being second most common (7 or 2.2%) and Portuguese being third (5 or 1.6%). There are 2 people who speak German, 3 people who speak Italian.

Of the population in the municipality 99 or about 31.5% were born in Chessel and lived there in 2000. There were 119 or 37.9% who were born in the same canton, while 41 or 13.1% were born somewhere else in Switzerland, and 54 or 17.2% were born outside of Switzerland. In 2008 there were 2 live births to Swiss citizens and 3 births to non-Swiss citizens, and in same time span there were 4 deaths of Swiss citizens. Ignoring immigration and emigration, the population of Swiss citizens decreased by 2 while the foreign population increased by 3. There . At the same time, there was 1 non-Swiss man who emigrated from Switzerland to another country and 1 non-Swiss woman who immigrated from another country to Switzerland. The total Swiss population change in 2008 (from all sources, including moves across municipal borders) was an increase of 2 and the non-Swiss population decreased by 7 people. This represents a population growth rate of -1.4%.

The age distribution, as of 2009, in Chessel is; 45 children or 13.1% of the population are between 0 and 9 years old and 52 teenagers or 15.1% are between 10 and 19. Of the adult population, 31 people or 9.0% of the population are between 20 and 29 years old. 45 people or 13.1% are between 30 and 39, 54 people or 15.7% are between 40 and 49, and 55 people or 16.0% are between 50 and 59. The senior population distribution is 29 people or 8.4% of the population are between 60 and 69 years old, 23 people or 6.7% are between 70 and 79, there are 9 people or 2.6% who are 80 and 89, and there is 1 person who is 90 and older.

As of 2000, there were 130 people who were single and never married in the municipality. There were 160 married individuals, 11 widows or widowers and 13 individuals who are divorced.

As of 2000, there were 111 private households in the municipality, and an average of 2.7 persons per household. There were 25 households that consist of only one person and 11 households with five or more people. Out of a total of 116 households that answered this question, 21.6% were households made up of just one person. Of the rest of the households, there are 27 married couples without children, 54 married couples with children There were 2 single parents with a child or children. There were 3 households that were made up of unrelated people and 5 households that were made up of some sort of institution or another collective housing.

In 2000 there were 72 single-family homes (or 74.2% of the total) out of a total of 97 inhabited buildings. There were 9 multi-family buildings (9.3%), along with 14 multi-purpose buildings that were mostly used for housing (14.4%) and 2 other use buildings (commercial or industrial) that also had some housing (2.1%). Of the single-family homes 6 were built before 1919, while 22 were built between 1990 and 2000. The greatest number of single-family homes (19) were built between 1981 and 1990. The most multi-family homes (4) were built before 1919 and the next most (2) were built between 1919 and 1945.

In 2000 there were 119 apartments in the municipality. The most common apartment size was 4 rooms of which there were 37. There were 2 single-room apartments and 54 apartments with five or more rooms. Of these apartments, a total of 103 apartments (86.6% of the total) were permanently occupied, while 14 apartments (11.8%) were seasonally occupied and 2 apartments (1.7%) were empty. As of 2009, the construction rate of new housing units was 0 new units per 1000 residents. The vacancy rate for the municipality, in 2010, was 0%.

The historical population is given in the following chart:

== Politics ==
In the 2007 federal election the most popular party was the SVP which received 29.63% of the vote. The next three most popular parties were the FDP (20.88%), the SP (15.3%) and the Green Party (15.08%). In the federal election, a total of 132 votes were cast, and the voter turnout was 55.9%.

== Economy ==
As of 2010, Chessel had an unemployment rate of 3.9%. As of 2008, there were 58 people employed in the primary economic sector and about 13 businesses involved in this sector. 3 people were employed in the secondary sector and there was 1 business in this sector. 25 people were employed in the tertiary sector, with 13 businesses in this sector. There were 144 residents of the municipality who were employed in some capacity, of which females made up 39.6% of the workforce.

In 2008 the total number of full-time equivalent jobs was 66. The number of jobs in the primary sector was 44, all of which were in agriculture. The number of jobs in the secondary sector was 2, all of which were in construction. The number of jobs in the tertiary sector was 20. In the tertiary sector; 2 or 10.0% were in wholesale or retail sales or the repair of motor vehicles, 7 or 35.0% were in a hotel or restaurant, 1 was in the information industry, 3 or 15.0% were technical professionals or scientists, 1 was in education.

In 2000, there were 22 workers who commuted into the municipality and 97 workers who commuted away. The municipality is a net exporter of workers, with about 4.4 workers leaving the municipality for every one entering. Of the working population, 6.3% used public transportation to get to work, and 63.2% used a private car.

== Religion ==
From the 2000 census, 73 or 23.2% were Roman Catholic, while 195 or 62.1% belonged to the Swiss Reformed Church. Of the rest of the population, there were 12 individuals (or about 3.82% of the population) who belonged to another Christian church. There were 13 (or about 4.14% of the population) who were Islamic. There were 2 individuals who were Buddhist. 19 (or about 6.05% of the population) belonged to no church, are agnostic or atheist.

== Education ==
In Chessel about 111 or (35.4%) of the population have completed non-mandatory upper secondary education, and 29 or (9.2%) have completed additional higher education (either university or a Fachhochschule). Of the 29 who completed tertiary schooling, 79.3% were Swiss men, 17.2% were Swiss women.

As of 2000, there were 7 students in Chessel who came from another municipality, while 69 residents attended schools outside the municipality.
