= Noville, Switzerland =

Noville
- Municipality
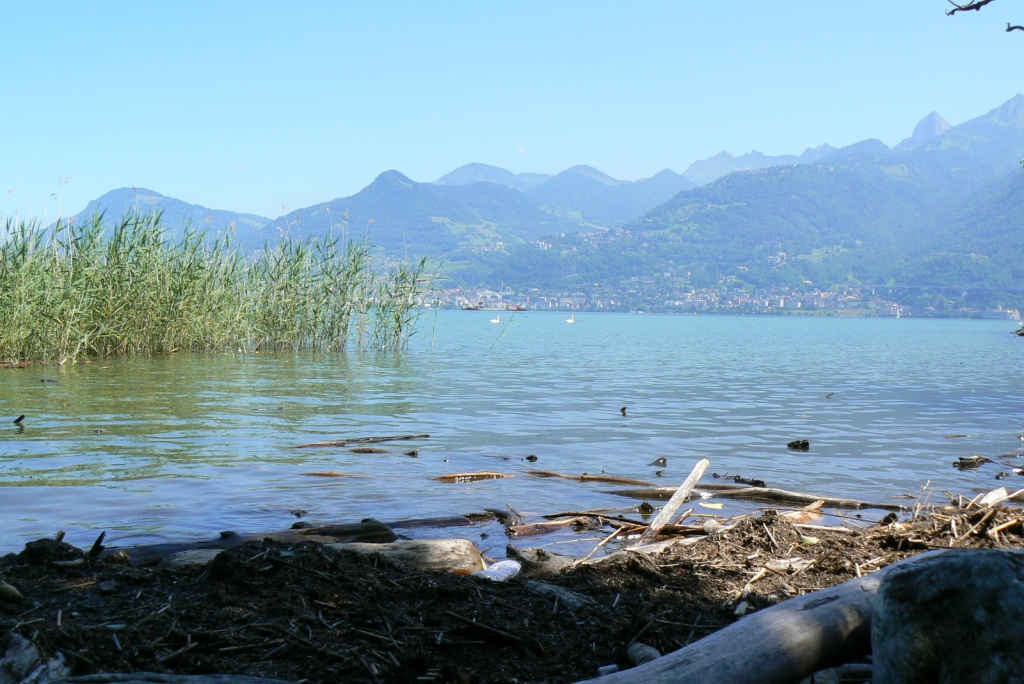
- Lake Geneva at Noville municipality

- Flag Coat of arms
- Location of Noville
- Location within Switzerland Location within Canton of Vaud
- Coordinates: 46°23′N 6°54′E
- Country: Switzerland
- Canton: Vaud
- District: Aigle

Government
  - Mayor: Syndic

Area
  - Total: 10.35 km^{2} (4.00 sq mi)
- Elevation: 378 m (1,240 ft)

Population (2000)
  - Total: 639
  - Density: 61.7/km^{2} (160/sq mi)
- Demonym: Les Novillois
- Time zone: UTC+01:00 (CET)
  - Summer (DST): UTC+02:00 (CEST)
- Postal code: 1845
- SFOS number: 5408
- ISO 3166 code: CH-VD
- Surrounded by: Chessel, La Tour-de-Peilz, Montreux, Port-Valais (VS), Rennaz, Vevey, Veytaux, Villeneuve
- Website: noville.ch

Noville is a municipality of the canton of Vaud in Switzerland, located in the district of Aigle.

== History ==
Noville is first mentioned in 903 as Nova villa. In 1162-1173 it was mentioned as Nouila. Due to the similarity between the names Noville and the neighboring municipality of Villeneuve (Villa Nova) it is very difficult to identify which village is being mentioned in older records.

Charlie Chaplin's coffin was found buried in a field near Noville after being stolen by Roman Wardas and Gantcho Ganev in an attempt to extort money from his widow, Oona Chaplin.

== Geography ==
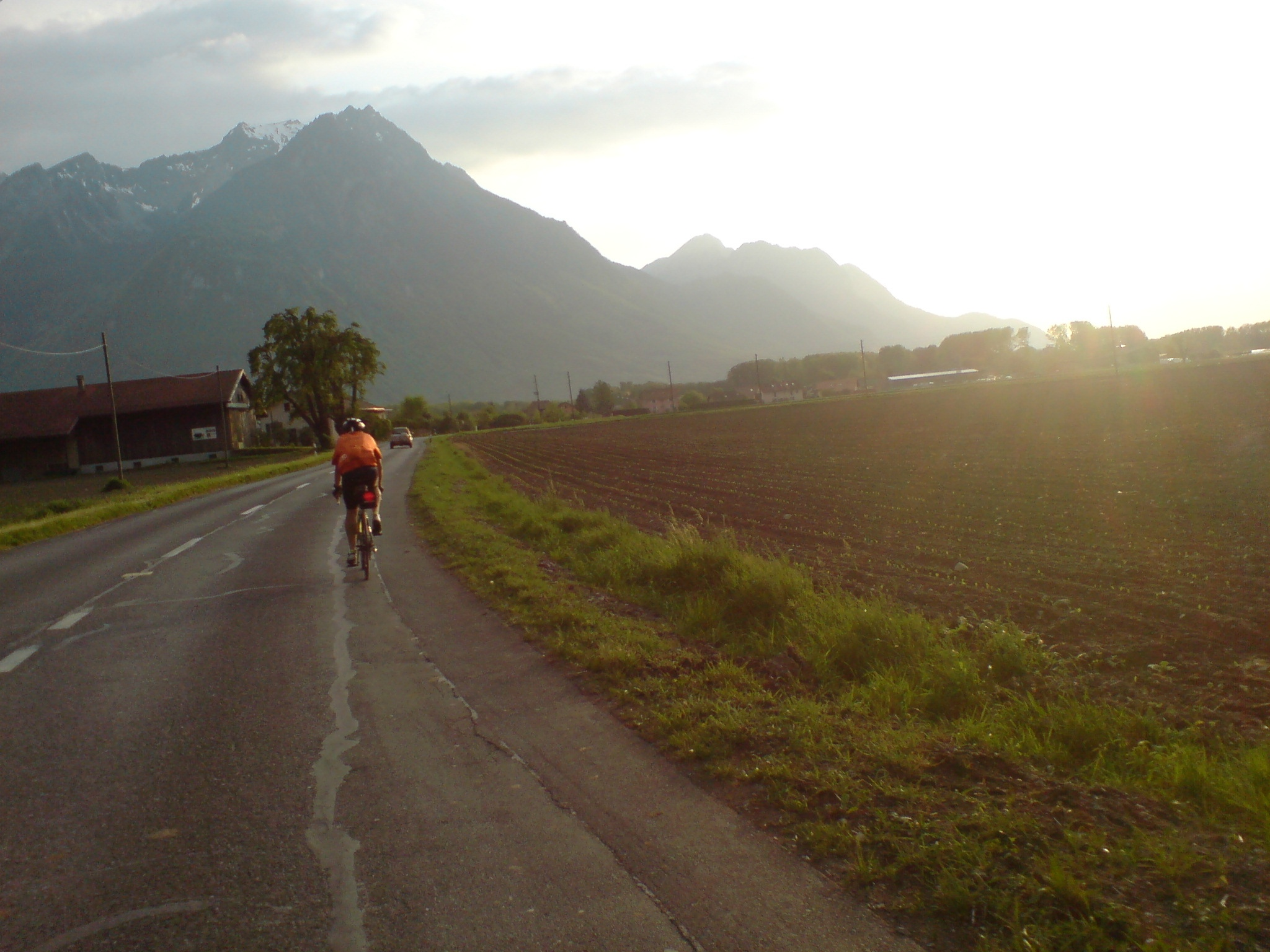
Fields and mountains near Noville

Aerial view (1971)

Noville has an area, as of 2009, of 10.35 square kilometers (4.00 sq mi). Of this area, 4.3 km^{2} (1.7 sq mi) or 41.5% is used for agricultural purposes, while 3.63 km^{2} (1.40 sq mi) or 35.1% is forested. Of the rest of the land, 0.88 km^{2} (0.34 sq mi) or 8.5% is settled (buildings or roads), 0.43 km^{2} (0.17 sq mi) or 4.2% is either rivers or lakes and 1.09 km^{2} (0.42 sq mi) or 10.5% is unproductive land.

Of the built up area, housing and buildings made up 3.4% and transportation infrastructure made up 2.3%. while parks, green belts and sports fields made up 1.3%. Out of the forested land, all of the forested land area is covered with heavy forests. Of the agricultural land, 34.8% is used for growing crops and 5.8% is pastures. Of the water in the municipality, 0.6% is in lakes and 3.6% is in rivers and streams.

The municipality is located in the Aigle district, on a small hill above the right bank of the Rhone river where it enters Lake Geneva. It consists of the village of Noville and the hamlet of Crebelley.

== Coat of arms ==
The blazon of the municipal coat of arms is Azure, a Griffin rampant Or langued and armed Gules.

== Demographics ==
Noville has a population (as of December 2020) of 1,178. As of 2008, 14.2% of the population are resident foreign nationals. Over the last 10 years (1999–2009 ) the population has changed at a rate of 10.1%. It has changed at a rate of 5.4% due to migration and at a rate of 4.6% due to births and deaths.

Most of the population (as of 2000) speaks French (579 or 89.5%), with German being second most common (32 or 4.9%) and Italian being third (17 or 2.6%).

Of the population in the municipality 207 or about 32.0% were born in Noville and lived there in 2000. There were 230 or 35.5% who were born in the same canton, while 103 or 15.9% were born somewhere else in Switzerland, and 83 or 12.8% were born outside of Switzerland.

In 2008 there were 7 live births to Swiss citizens and 1 birth to non-Swiss citizens, and in same time span there were 4 deaths of Swiss citizens. Ignoring immigration and emigration, the population of Swiss citizens increased by 3 while the foreign population increased by 1. There was 1 Swiss woman who emigrated from Switzerland. At the same time, there were 4 non-Swiss men and 1 non-Swiss woman who immigrated from another country to Switzerland. The total Swiss population change in 2008 (from all sources, including moves across municipal borders) was an increase of 6 and the non-Swiss population increased by 3 people. This represents a population growth rate of 1.3%.

The age distribution, as of 2009, in Noville is; 75 children or 10.8% of the population are between 0 and 9 years old and 102 teenagers or 14.6% are between 10 and 19. Of the adult population, 61 people or 8.8% of the population are between 20 and 29 years old. 70 people or 10.0% are between 30 and 39, 136 people or 19.5% are between 40 and 49, and 95 people or 13.6% are between 50 and 59. The senior population distribution is 90 people or 12.9% of the population are between 60 and 69 years old, 39 people or 5.6% are between 70 and 79, there are 26 people or 3.7% who are 80 and 89, and there are 3 people or 0.4% who are 90 and older.

As of 2000, there were 246 people who were single and never married in the municipality. There were 344 married individuals, 29 widows or widowers and 28 individuals who are divorced.

As of 2000, there were 253 private households in the municipality, and an average of 2.4 persons per household. There were 64 households that consist of only one person and 18 households with five or more people. Out of a total of 262 households that answered this question, 24.4% were households made up of just one person and there were 4 adults who lived with their parents. Of the rest of the households, there are 83 married couples without children, 91 married couples with children There were 8 single parents with a child or children. There were 3 households that were made up of unrelated people and 9 households that were made up of some sort of institution or another collective housing.

In 2000 there were 135 single-family homes (or 66.5% of the total) out of a total of 203 inhabited buildings. There were 31 multi-family buildings (15.3%), along with 27 multi-purpose buildings that were mostly used for housing (13.3%) and 10 other use buildings (commercial or industrial) that also had some housing (4.9%). Of the single-family homes 27 were built before 1919, while 18 were built between 1990 and 2000. The greatest number of single-family homes (28) were built between 1981 and 1990. The most multi-family homes (10) were built before 1919 and the next most (7) were built between 1919 and 1945. There was 1 multi-family house built between 1996 and 2000.

In 2000 there were 273 apartments in the municipality. The most common apartment size was 3 rooms of which there were 74. There were 6 single-room apartments and 101 apartments with five or more rooms. Of these apartments, a total of 228 apartments (83.5% of the total) were permanently occupied, while 33 apartments (12.1%) were seasonally occupied and 12 apartments (4.4%) were empty. As of 2009, the construction rate of new housing units was 0 new units per 1000 residents. The vacancy rate for the municipality, in 2010, was 0%.

The historical population is given in the following chart:

== Sights ==
The entire village of Noville is designated as part of the Inventory of Swiss Heritage Sites.

== Politics ==
In the 2007 federal election the most popular party was the SVP which received 38.08% of the vote. The next three most popular parties were the SP (21.26%), the FDP (17.21%) and the LPS Party (6.68%). In the federal election, a total of 212 votes were cast, and the voter turnout was 46.5%.

== Economy ==
As of 2010, Noville had an unemployment rate of 2.1%. As of 2008, there were 77 people employed in the primary economic sector and about 23 businesses involved in this sector. 76 people were employed in the secondary sector and there were 13 businesses in this sector. 183 people were employed in the tertiary sector, with 33 businesses in this sector. There were 345 residents of the municipality who were employed in some capacity, of which females made up 44.1% of the workforce.

In 2008 the total number of full-time equivalent jobs was 295. The number of jobs in the primary sector was 65, all of which were in agriculture. The number of jobs in the secondary sector was 72 of which 28 or (38.9%) were in manufacturing and 43 (59.7%) were in construction. The number of jobs in the tertiary sector was 158. In the tertiary sector; 99 or 62.7% were in wholesale or retail sales or the repair of motor vehicles, 4 or 2.5% were in the movement and storage of goods, 21 or 13.3% were in a hotel or restaurant, 8 or 5.1% were in the information industry, 5 or 3.2% were the insurance or financial industry, 3 or 1.9% were technical professionals or scientists, 6 or 3.8% were in education.

In 2000, there were 140 workers who commuted into the municipality and 226 workers who commuted away. The municipality is a net exporter of workers, with about 1.6 workers leaving the municipality for every one entering. About 10.7% of the workforce coming into Noville are coming from outside Switzerland. Of the working population, 9% used public transportation to get to work, and 61.7% used a private car.

== Religion ==
From the 2000 census, 168 or 26.0% were Roman Catholic, while 380 or 58.7% belonged to the Swiss Reformed Church. Of the rest of the population, there was 1 member of an Orthodox church who belonged, and there were 5 individuals (or about 0.77% of the population) who belonged to another Christian church. There was 1 individual who was Jewish, and 12 (or about 1.85% of the population) who were Islamic. There were 2 individuals who were Buddhist and 2 individuals who belonged to another church. 50 (or about 7.73% of the population) belonged to no church, are agnostic or atheist, and 26 individuals (or about 4.02% of the population) did not answer the question.

== Education ==
In Noville about 254 or (39.3%) of the population have completed non-mandatory upper secondary education, and 58 or (9.0%) have completed additional higher education (either university or a Fachhochschule). Of the 58 who completed tertiary schooling, 53.4% were Swiss men, 27.6% were Swiss women, 12.1% were non-Swiss men.

In the 2009/2010 school year there were a total of 93 students in the Noville school district. In the Vaud cantonal school system, two years of non-obligatory pre-school are provided by the political districts. During the school year, the political district provided pre-school care for a total of 205 children of which 96 children (46.8%) received subsidized pre-school care. The canton's primary school program requires students to attend for four years. There were 49 students in the municipal primary school program. The obligatory lower secondary school program lasts for six years and there were 44 students in those schools.

As of 2000, there were 12 students in Noville who came from another municipality, while 86 residents attended schools outside the municipality.

== Charlie Chaplin Incident ==
On 1 March 1978, Charlie Chaplin's coffin was dug up and stolen from its grave by two unemployed mechanics, Roman Wardas and Gantcho Ganev. The body was held for ransom in an attempt to extort money from his widow, Oona Chaplin. The pair were caught in a large police operation in May, and Chaplin's coffin was found buried in a field in Noville.
