= Leysin =

- Municipality
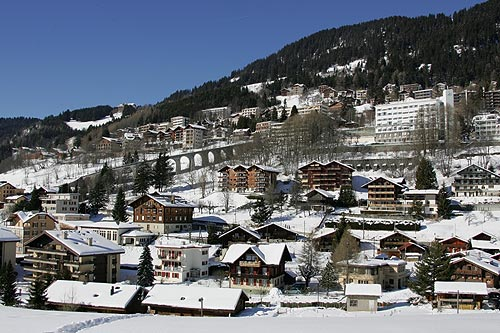

- Flag Coat of arms
- Location of Leysin
- Location within Switzerland Location within Canton of Vaud
- Coordinates: 46°20′N 7°00′E
- Country: Switzerland
- Canton: Vaud
- District: Aigle

Government
  - Mayor: Syndic

Area
  - Total: 18.57 km^{2} (7.17 sq mi)
- Elevation: 1,260 m (4,130 ft)

Population (December 2007)
  - Total: 3,486
  - Density: 187.7/km^{2} (486.2/sq mi)
- Demonym: Leysenouds
- Time zone: UTC+01:00 (CET)
  - Summer (DST): UTC+02:00 (CEST)
- Postal code: 1854
- SFOS number: 5407
- ISO 3166 code: CH-VD
- Localities: Crettaz, Veyges
- Surrounded by: Ormont-Dessous, Aigle, Yvorne, Corbeyrier
- Website: leysin-commune.ch/

Leysin is a municipality of the canton of Vaud in the Aigle district of Switzerland. It is first mentioned around 1231–32 as Leissins, in 1352 as Leisins.

Located in the Vaud Alps, Leysin is a sunny alpine resort village at the eastern end of Lake Geneva in proximity to Montreux, Lausanne, and Geneva. In earlier years, Leysin was known for its TB sanatorias; today it is most famous for spectacular Alpine views across the Rhône Valley towards the Dents du Midi and year-round mountain sports and recreational facilities.

The village of Leysin and hamlet of Veyges are a designated part of the Inventory of Swiss Heritage Sites.

== Geography ==
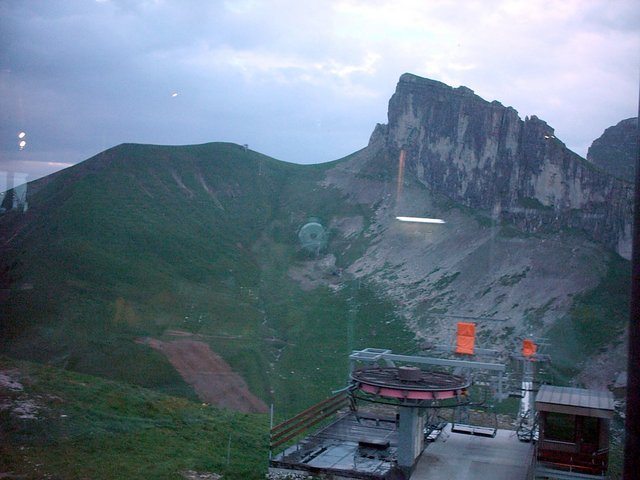
Tour d'Aï from Berneuse

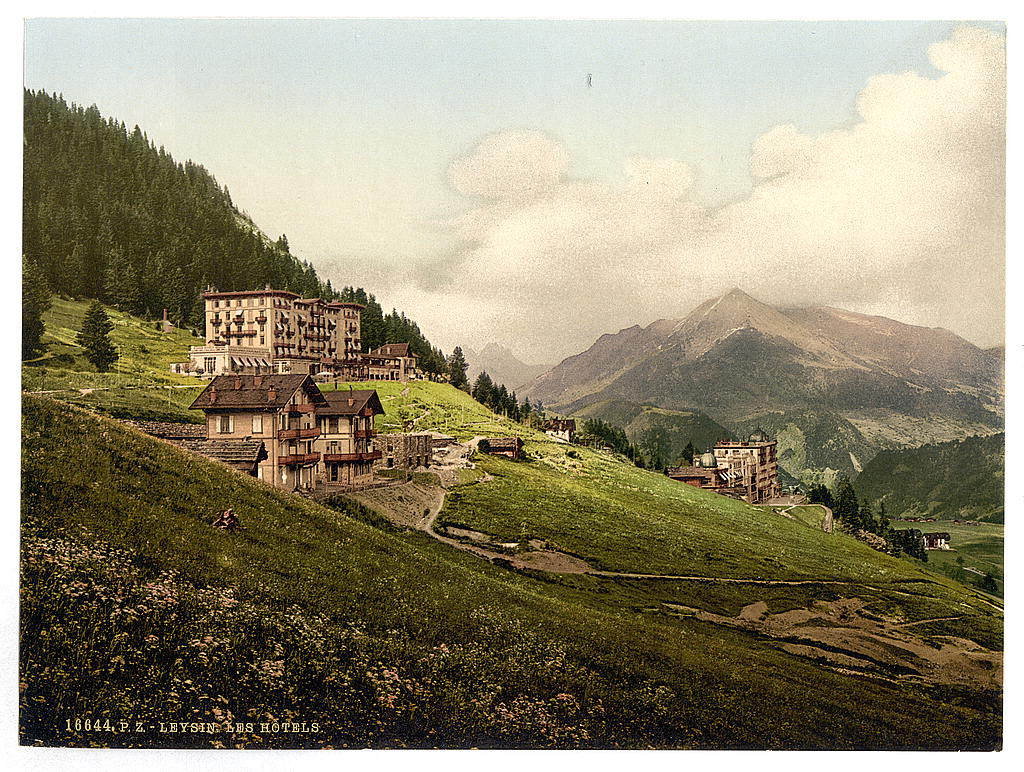
Old photochrom showing some of the resorts in Leysin

Aerial view by Walter Mittelholzer (1919)

Leysin has an area, as of 2009, of 18.57 square kilometers (7.17 sq mi). Of this area, 6.48 km^{2} (2.50 sq mi) or 34.9% is used for agricultural purposes, while 6.91 km^{2} (2.67 sq mi) or 37.2% is forested. Of the rest of the land, 1.43 km^{2} (0.55 sq mi) or 7.7% is settled (buildings or roads), 0.04 km^{2} (9.9 acres) or 0.2% is either rivers or lakes and 3.67 km^{2} (1.42 sq mi) or 19.8% is unproductive land.

- Built-up areas: housing and buildings 4.4%; transport infrastructure 2.0%.
- Forested land: heavily forested 33.3%; orchards or small clusters of trees 3.4%.
- Agricultural land: alpine pastures 24.7%; other pastureland 10.0%; crops 0.0%
- Unproductive areas: unproductive vegetation 12.9%; too rocky for vegetation 6.9%
- All the water in the municipality is flowing water.

The municipality is located in the Aigle district, on the right side of the Grande-Eau at the foot of the Tour d'Aï and the Tour de Mayen. The main village is located at an elevation of 1,260 m (4,130 ft). It consists of the village of Leysin and the hamlets of Veyges, Feydey, Aï, and Mayen.

Leysin can be accessed by road or by the hourly Aigle - Leysin train, which makes four stops in the area.

== Coat of arms ==
The blazon of the municipal coat of arms is Per fess Sable and Or, overall issuant from Hills in base a Pinetree all Vert.

== Demographics ==
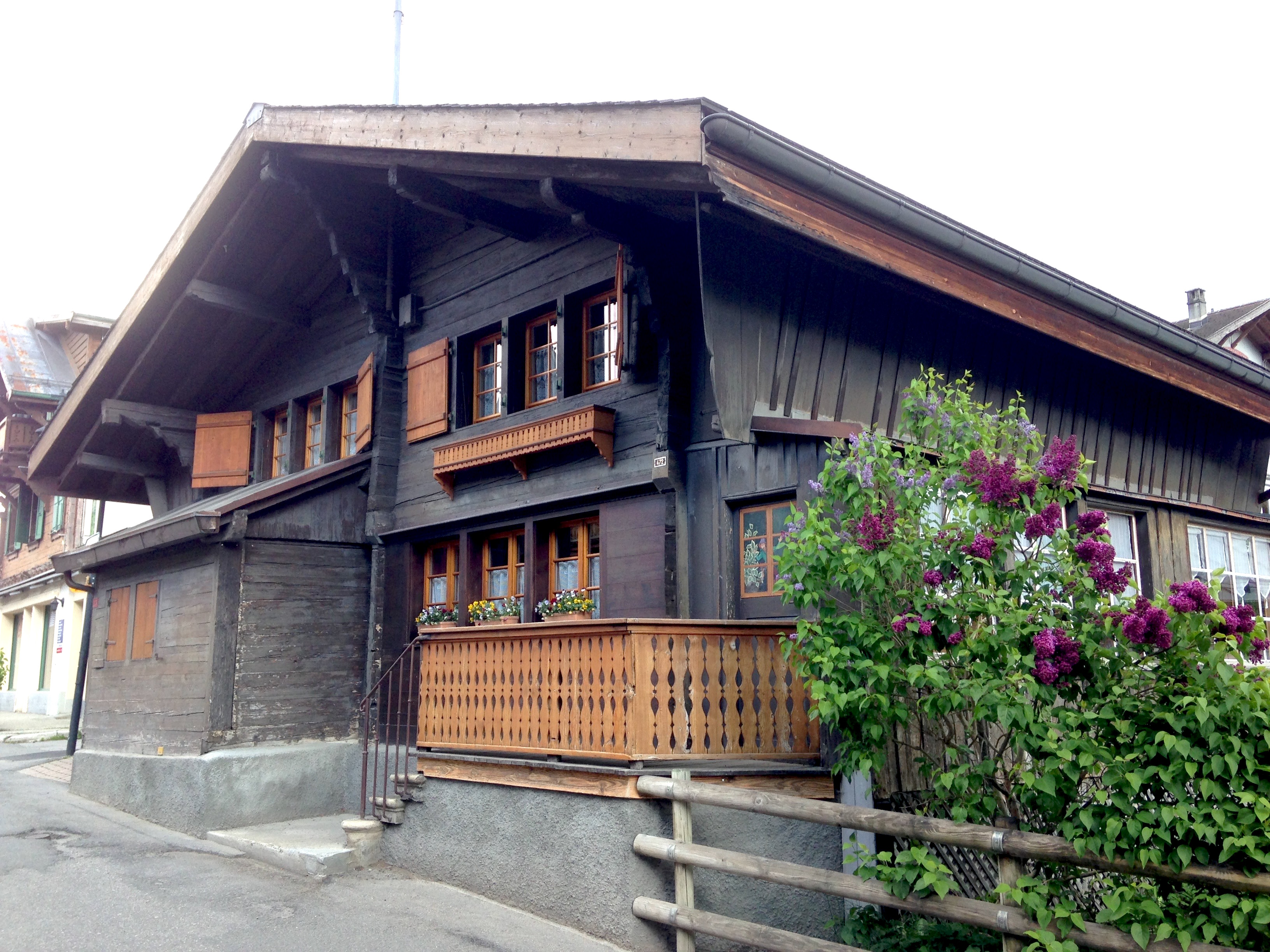
The oldest chalet in Leysin, built in 1600.

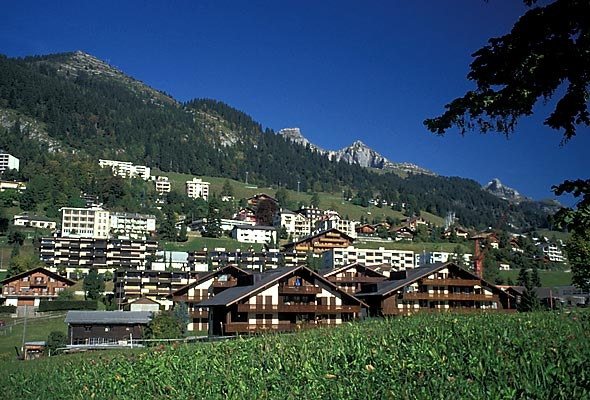
View of Leysin and surrounding mountains

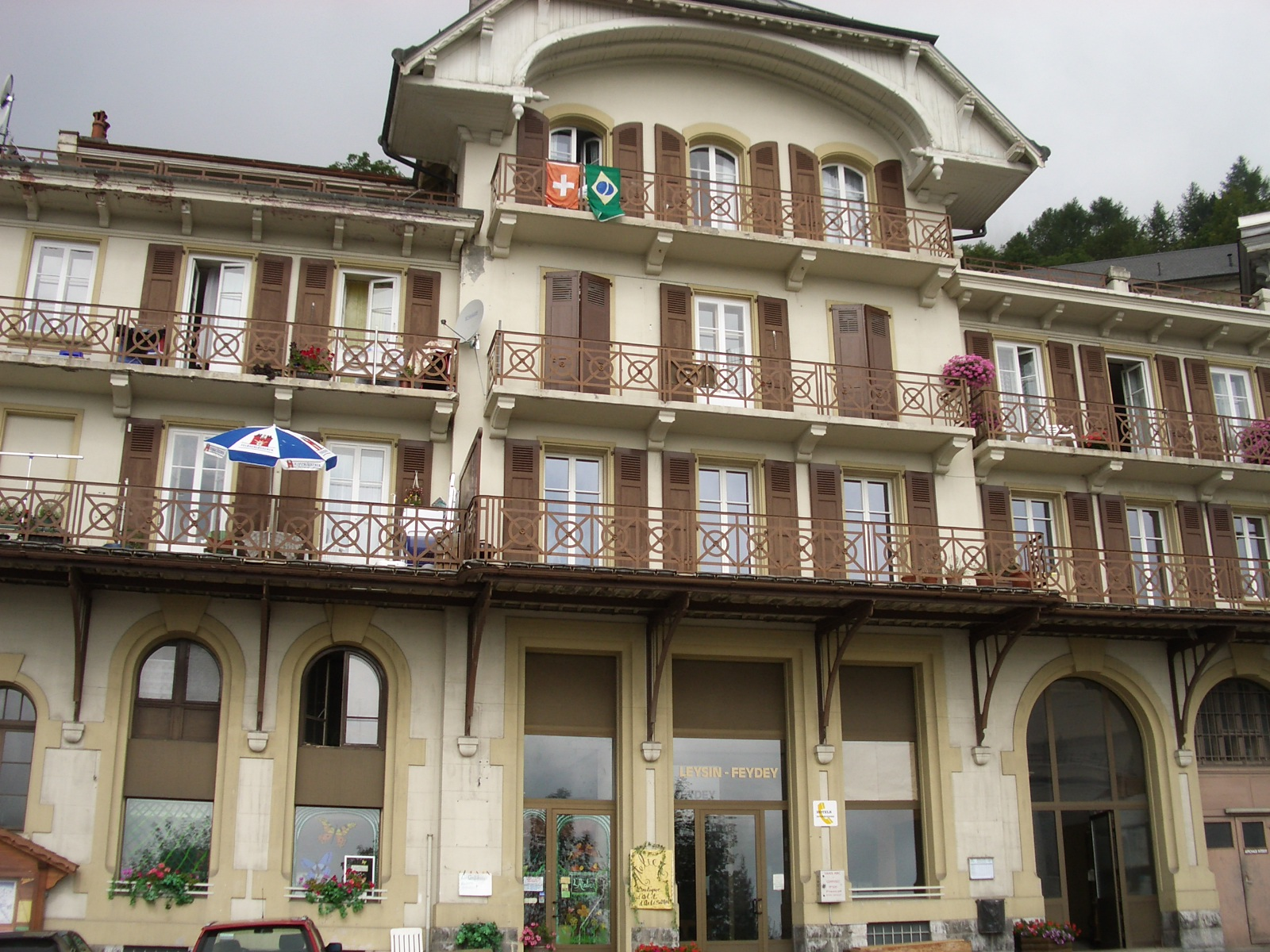
Leysin-Feydey train station

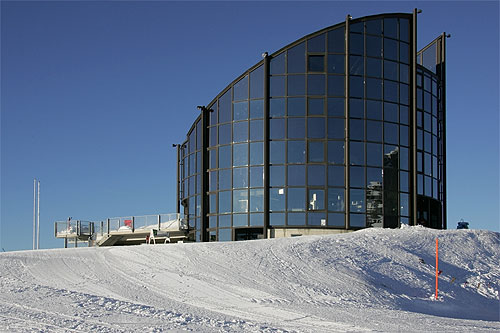
Restaurant Tournant Kuklos atop the 2045 m la Berneuse

Leysin has a population (as of December 2020) of 3,623. As of 2008, 59.3% of the population are resident foreign nationals. Over the last 10 years (1999–2009) the population has changed at a rate of 37.5%. It has changed at a rate of 39.4% due to migration and at a rate of 2.6% due to births and deaths.

Most of the population (as of 2000) speaks French (1,683 or 56.1%), with English being the second most common language (356 or 11.9%) and German third (104 or 3.5%). There are 43 people who speak Italian and one person who speaks Romansh.

Of the population in the municipality 539 or about 18.0% were born in Leysin and lived there in 2000. There were 424 or 14.1% who were born in the same canton, while 361 or 12.0% were born somewhere else in Switzerland, and 1,525 or 50.9% outside of Switzerland.

In 2008 there were 14 live births to Swiss citizens and 11 births to non-Swiss citizens, and in same time period there were 17 deaths of Swiss citizens and one of a non-Swiss citizen. Ignoring immigration and emigration, the population of Swiss citizens decreased by three while the foreign population increased by ten. Ten Swiss men and five Swiss women were former emigrants who had returned to Switzerland, while 95 non-Swiss men and 140 non-Swiss women where immigrants to Switzerland. The total Swiss population change in 2008 (from all sources, including moves across municipal borders) was an increase of 17 and the non-Swiss population increased by 240. This represents a population growth rate of 7.4%.

The age distribution, as of 2009, in Leysin is; 271 children or 7.2% of the population are between 0 and 9 years old and 961 older children and teenagers or 25.6% are between 10 and 19. 843 people or 22.4% of the population are aged 20–29, 391 people or 10.4% are 30–39 years old, 426 people or 11.3% are between 40 and 49, and 341 people or 9.1% are between 50 and 59. The distribution of the senior part of the population is: 305 people or 8.1% between 60 and 69 years old; 148 people or 3.9% aged 70–79; 61 people or 1.6% are between 80 and 89, and there are 12 people or 0.3% who are 90 or older.

As of 2000, 1,699 of the municipality's inhabitants were single and had never been married. There were 989 married individuals, 126 widows or widowers, and 184 divorced people.

As of 2000, there were 937 private households in the municipality, with an average occupancy of 2.1 persons per household. There were 409 households consisting of just one person and 30 households with five or more people. Out of a total of 1,004 households that answered this question, 40.7% were made up of just one person and there were three adults wliving with their parents. Of the remainder of the households, 223 were married couples without children and 235 were married couples with children. There were 56 single parents with one or more children. Eleven households that were made up of unrelated people, while 67 households consututed institutions or some other kind of collective housing.

In 2000 there were 312 single-family homes (or 43.3% of the total) out of a total of 720 inhabited buildings. There were 235 multi-family buildings (32.6%), along with 68 multi-purpose buildings that were chiefly being used for housing (9.4%) and 105 other-use buildings (commercial or industrial) that also had some housing (14.6%). Of the single-family homes 103 were built before 1919, while 19 were built between 1990 and 2000. The majority of multi-family homes (76) were built before 1919 and the next biggest proportion (43) were built between 1961 and 1970. There was one multi-family house built between 1996 and 2000.

In 2000 there were 2,345 apartments in the municipality. The most common apartment size was three rooms, of which there were 711. There were 344 single-room apartments and 289 apartments with five or more rooms. Of these apartments, a total of 885 (37.7% of the total) were permanently occupied, while 1,095 (46.7%) were seasonally occupied, and 365 (15.6%) were empty.

As of 2009, the construction rate of new housing units was 3.5 new units per 1000 residents. The vacancy rate for the municipality, in 2010, was 2.51%.

The historical population is given in the following chart:

== Politics ==
In the 2007 federal election the most popular party was the FDP which received 21.19% of the vote. The next three most popular parties were the SVP (20.41%), the SP (19.92%) and the Green Party (15.84%). In the federal election, a total of 477 votes were cast, and the voter turnout was 40.7%.

== Economy ==
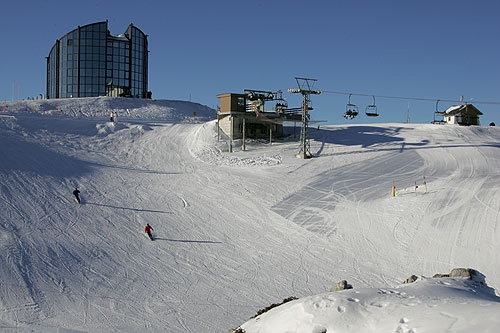
Ski lift, restaurant and skiing in Leysin

As of 2010, Leysin had an unemployment rate of 4.8%. As of 2008, there were 39 people employed in the primary economic sector and about 13 businesses involved in this sector. 137 people were employed in the secondary sector and there were 26 businesses in this sector. 1,074 people were employed in the tertiary sector, with 116 businesses in this sector. There were 1,160 residents of the municipality who were employed in some capacity, of which females made up 45.7% of the workforce.

In 2008 the total number of full-time equivalent jobs was 1,080. The number of jobs in the primary sector was 30, of which 21 were in agriculture and 8 were in forestry or lumber production. The number of jobs in the secondary sector was 128 of which 36 or (28.1%) were in manufacturing and 85 (66.4%) were in construction. The number of jobs in the tertiary sector was 922. In the tertiary sector; 76 or 8.2% were in wholesale or retail sales or the repair of motor vehicles, 54 or 5.9% were in the movement and storage of goods, 167 or 18.1% were in a hotel or restaurant, 13 or 1.4% were the insurance or financial industry, 7 or 0.8% were technical professionals or scientists, 351 or 38.1% were in education and 174 or 18.9% were in health care.

In 2000, there were 206 workers who commuted into the municipality and 234 workers who commuted away. The municipality is a net exporter of workers, with about 1.1 workers leaving the municipality for every one entering. Of the working population, 10.3% used public transportation to get to work, and 45.3% used a private car.

== Religion ==
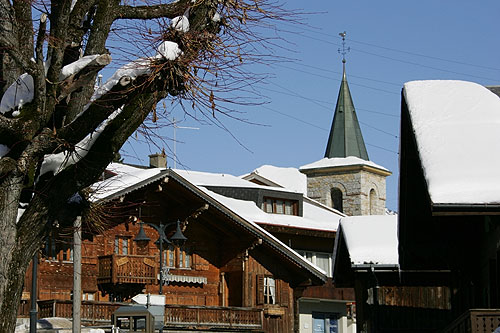
Church tower in Leysin village

From the 2000 census, 769 or 25.7% were Roman Catholic, while 803 or 26.8% belonged to the Swiss Reformed Church. Of the rest of the population, there were 110 members of an Orthodox church (or about 3.67% of the population), there was 1 individual who belongs to the Christian Catholic Church, and there were 50 individuals (or about 1.67% of the population) who belonged to another Christian church. There were 3 individuals (or about 0.10% of the population) who were Jewish, and 63 (or about 2.10% of the population) who were Islamic. There were 84 individuals who were Buddhist, 23 individuals who were Hindu and 6 individuals who belonged to another church. 612 (or about 20.41% of the population) belonged to no church, are agnostic or atheist, and 474 individuals (or about 15.81% of the population) did not answer the question.

== Education ==
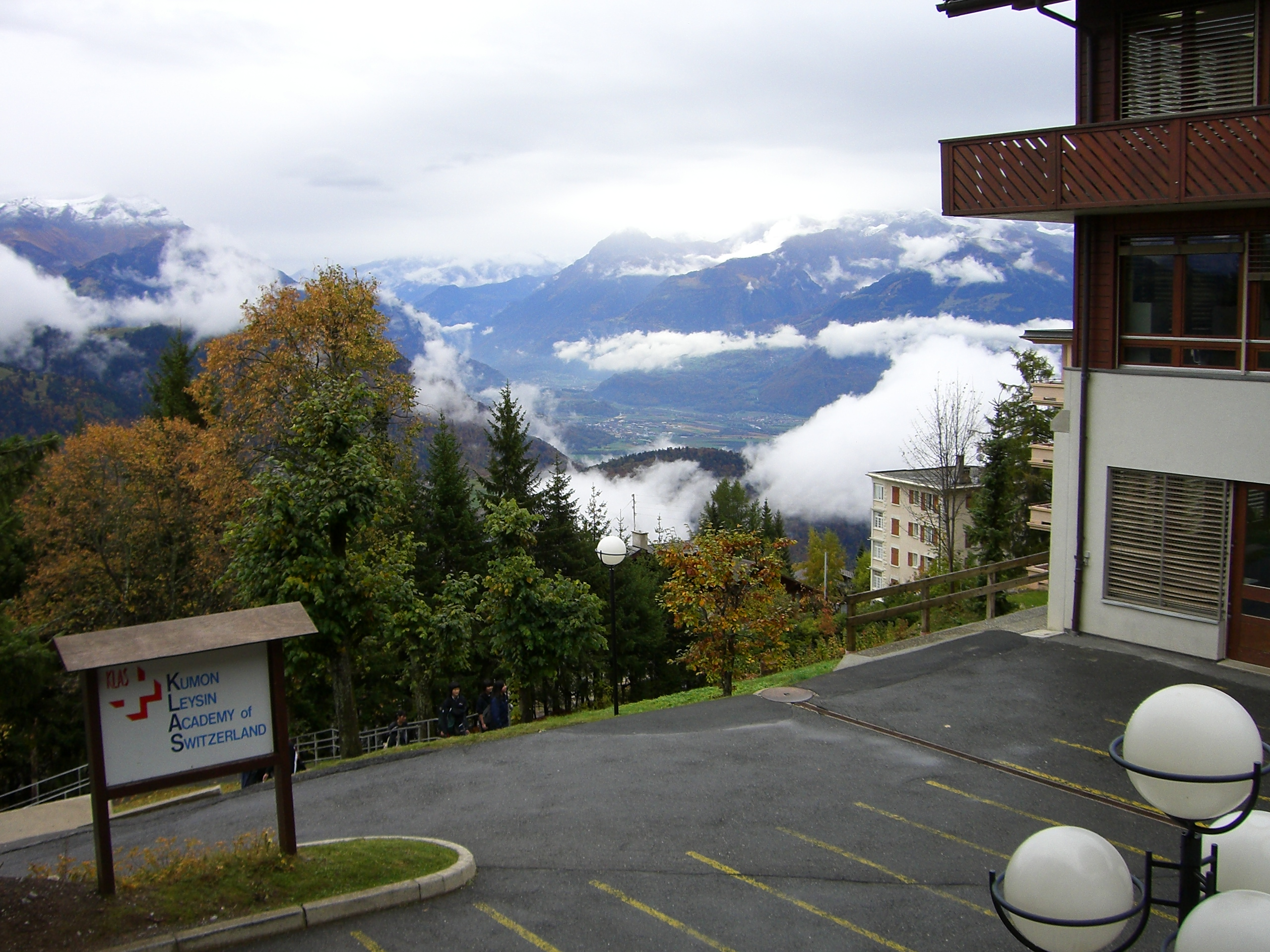
Kumon Leysin Academy of Switzerland

In Leysin about 658 or (21.9%) of the population have completed non-mandatory upper secondary education, and 365 or (12.2%) have completed additional higher education (either university or a Fachhochschule). Of the 365 who completed tertiary schooling, 27.9% were Swiss men, 18.4% were Swiss women, 28.2% were non-Swiss men and 25.5% were non-Swiss women.

In the 2009/2010 school year there were a total of 317 students in the Leysin school district. In the Vaud cantonal school system, two years of non-obligatory pre-school are provided by the political districts. During the school year, the political district provided pre-school care for a total of 205 children of which 96 children (46.8%) received subsidized pre-school care. The canton's primary school program requires students to attend for four years. There were 175 students in the municipal primary school program. The obligatory lower secondary school program lasts for six years and there were 139 students in those schools. There were also 3 students who were home schooled or attended another non-traditional school.

As of 2000, there were 39 students in Leysin who came from another municipality, while 98 residents attended schools outside the municipality.

=== Primary and secondary schools ===
Leysin is presently the home to two international schools serving secondary education levels: Leysin American School and Kumon Leysin Academy of Switzerland.

=== Colleges and universities ===
Swiss Hotel Management School, an international tertiary education institution, has one campus Leysin. Leysin previously hosted two other higher educational institutions that no longer exist; there was once a campus of the Schiller International University located in Leysin as well as the American College of Switzerland which is no longer in operation.

=== Public libraries ===
The Leysin Library (Bibliothèque de Leysin) is located in the municipality, near the communal school. Its collection includes 6,500 publications.

=== Other institutions ===
Leysin also has language schools: Ecole Suisse de Langues, Swiss Language Club, and Voxlingua Language School.

== Sport ==
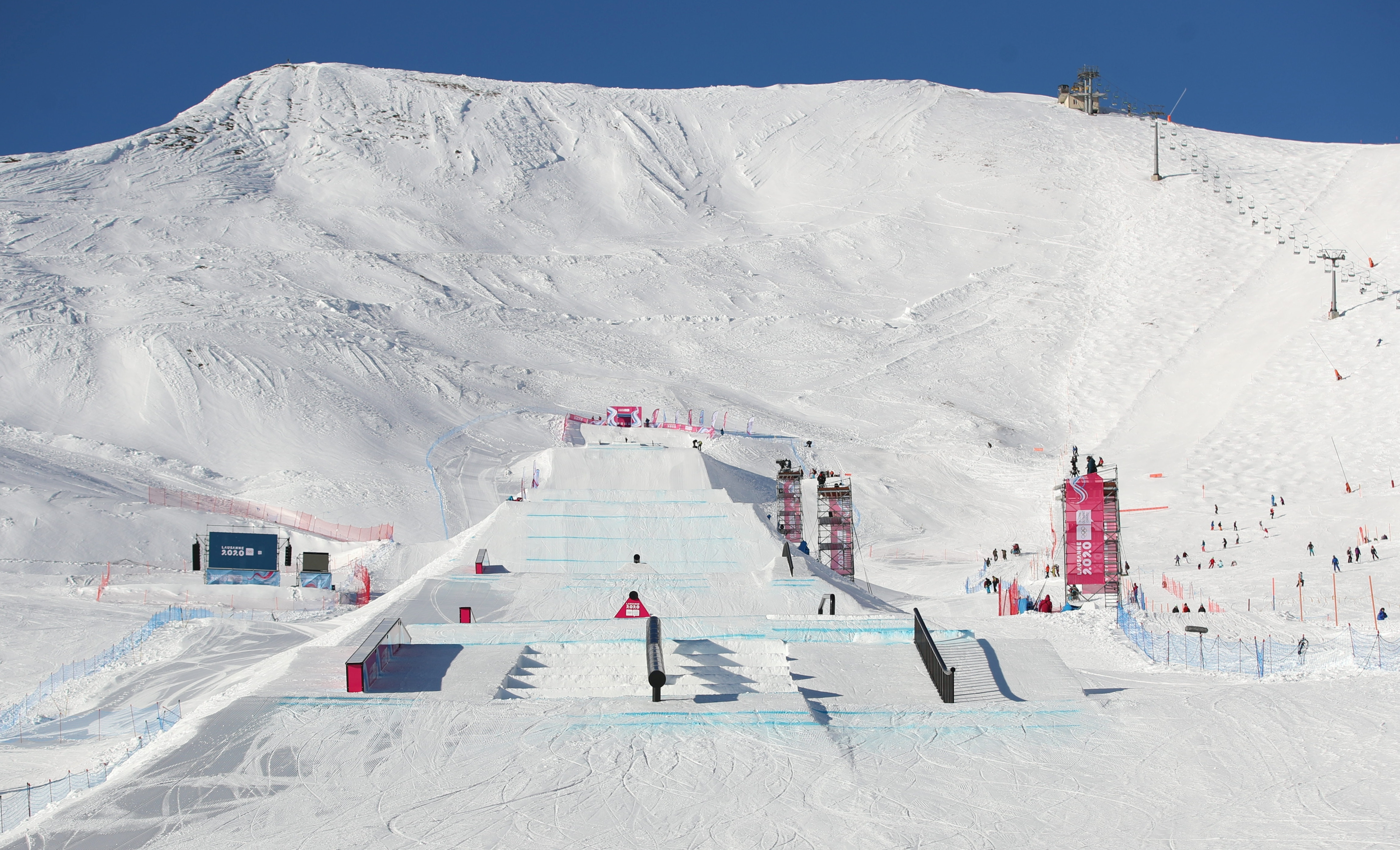
Slopestyle track of the 2020 Winter Youth Olympics in Leysin

Leysin hosted the FIS Snowboard World Cup 2008.

Leysin has hosted three world cup events in recent years: Boardercross, Speedskiing, and downhill mountain-biking.

Leysin also hosted the 2020 Winter Youth Olympics.

== Work of Art ==
On 26 April 2020 a biodegradable image called "Beyond Crisis" was made by the French artist Saype (Guillaume Legros) to inspire hope for the world after the COVID-19 pandemic. It was unveiled in a meadow near Leysin. The chalk and charcoal powder design covers approximately 3,000 m^{2} (32,000 ft^{2}). Viewed from the air in a certain angle, it looks like a 3-dimensional sitting girl with a circular line of stick figures in front of her. The image will last for about two to four weeks before it is covered by grass and washed away by rain.
