= Chaux Ronde =

Mountain in Switzerland

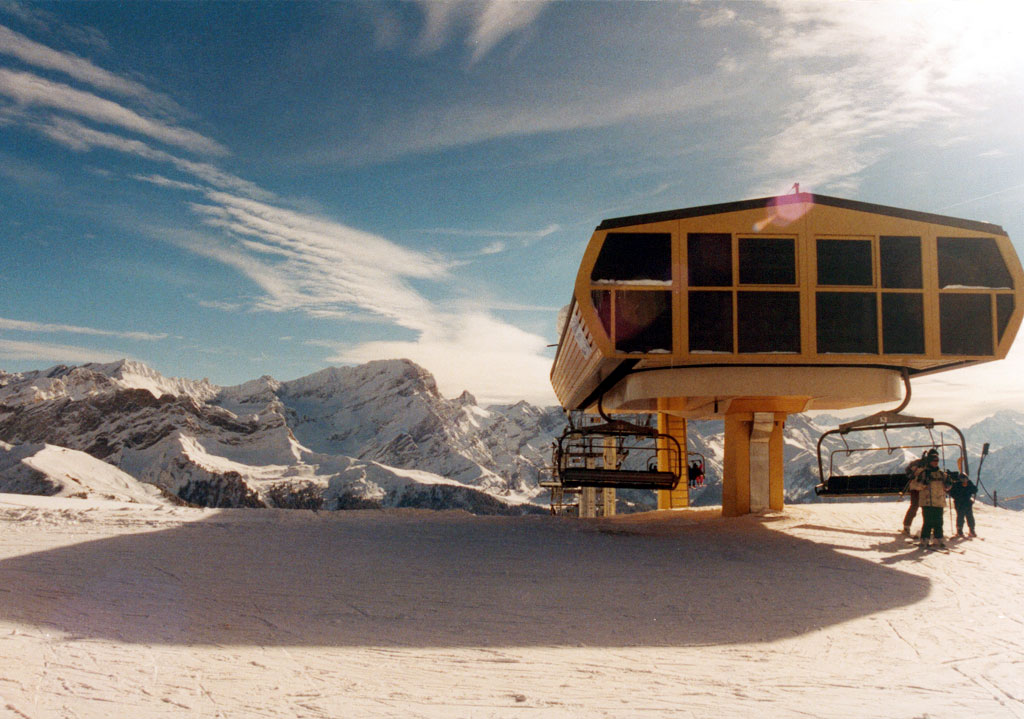
- View from ski-lift station, looking south

Highest point
- Elevation: 2,028 m (6,654 ft)
- Prominence: 223 m (732 ft)
- Parent peak: Chamossaire
- Coordinates: 46°19′22″N 7°05′34″E

Geography
- Location within Switzerland
- Location: Vaud, Switzerland
- Parent range: Bernese Alps

The Chaux Ronde (2,028 m) is a mountain in the western Bernese Alps, overlooking Villars-sur-Ollon in the canton of Vaud. The mountain is part of a ski area and its summit is easily accessible from Bretaye with the Bex–Villars–Bretaye railway.

A ski-lift leads to a secondary summit (1,987 m).
