= Rail transport in Switzerland =

Rail network of Switzerland
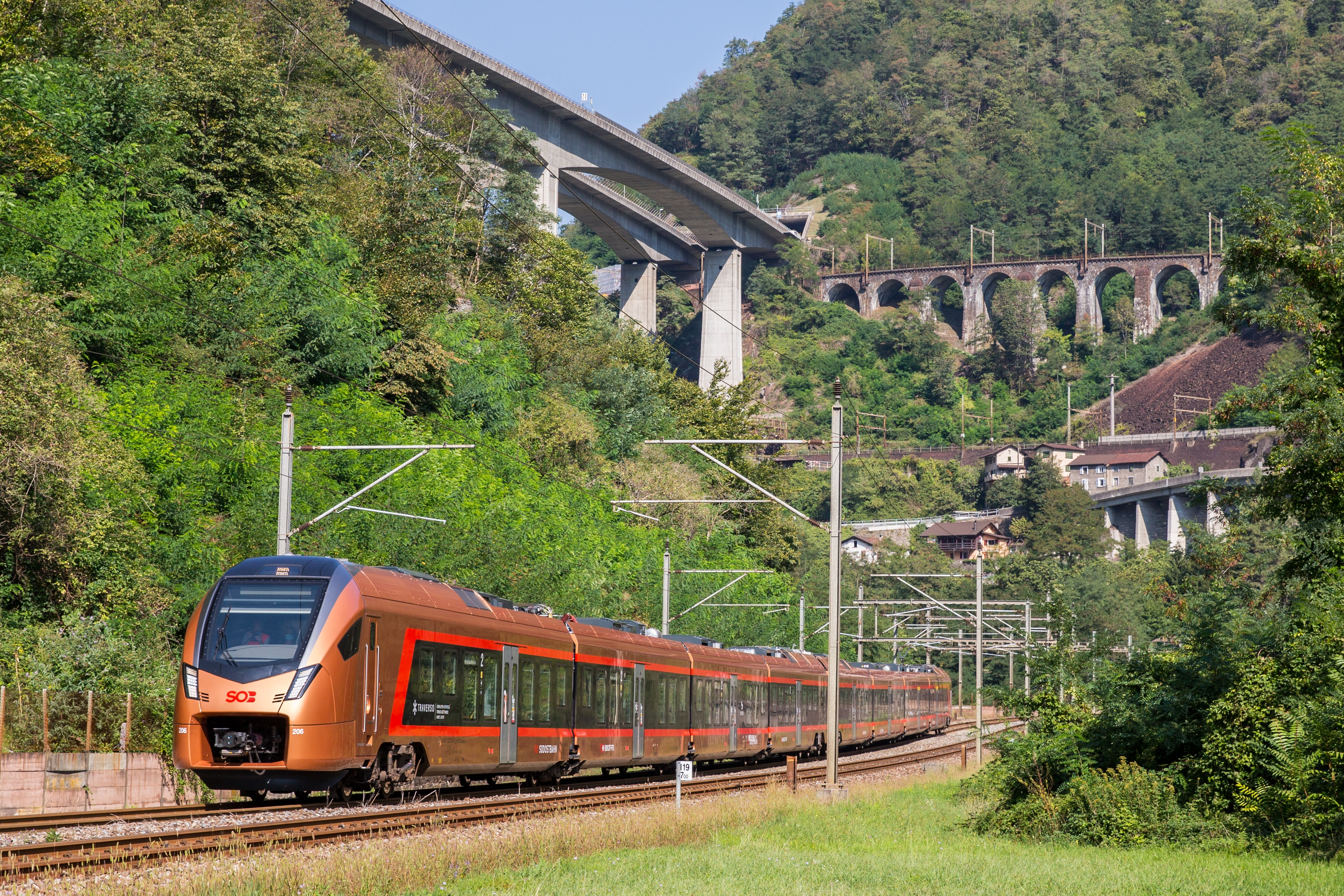
- SOB Traverso on the Gotthard Railway

Operation
- National railway: Swiss Federal Railways
- Major operators: Swiss Federal Railways (SBB CFF FFS); BLS AG (BLS); Rhaetian Railway (RhB); Matterhorn-Gotthard-Bahn (MGB)

System length
- Total: 5,323 km (3,308 mi)
- Electrified: 99%
- High-speed: 137 (Note: incomplete figure) km (85.1 mi)

Track gauge
- Main: 1,435 mm / 4 ft 8 1/2 in standard gauge
- High-speed: standard gauge
- 1,000 mm metre gauge: 865.7 km (537.9 mi)
- 800 mm: 55.2 km (34.3 mi)
- 750 mm: 13 km (8.1 mi)
- 1,200 mm: 1.964 km (1.2 mi)

Electrification
- Main: 15 kV 16.7 Hz
- standard gauge: 3,773.4 km (2,344.7 mi)
- metre gauge: 865.7 km (537.9 mi)

Features
- No. of tunnels: 612
- Tunnel length: 439.4 km (273.03 mi)
- Longest tunnel: Gotthard Base Tunnel 57.09 km (35.47 mi)
- No. of bridges: 7558
- No. of stations: 1838
- Max elevation: Jungfraujoch railway station at 3,454 metres (11,332 ft)
- Min elevation: Piano di Magadino at 200 metres (660 ft)
Map

Rail transport in Switzerland is noteworthy for the density of its network, its coordination between services, its integration with other modes of transport, timeliness and a thriving domestic and trans-Alp freight system. It is made necessary by strong regulations on truck transport, and is enabled by properly coordinated intermodal logistics.

With 5,200 kilometres (3,200 miles) network length, Switzerland has a dense railway network, and is the clear European leader in kilometres traveled: 2,505 km (1,557 mi) per inhabitant and year (2019). Worldwide, only the Japanese travel more by train.

Virtually 100% of its network is electrified, except for the few tracks on which steam locomotives operate for tourism purposes only. There are 74 railway companies in Switzerland. The share of commuters who travel to work using public transport (as the primary mode of transport) is 30%. The share of rail in goods transport performance by road and rail (modal split) is 39%.

Switzerland was ranked first among national European rail systems in the 2017 European Railway Performance Index for its intensity of use, quality of service and strong safety rating. Switzerland had excellent intensity of use, notably driven by passenger traffic, a good rating for quality of service, and an excellent rating for safety. Switzerland captured high value in return for public investment with cost to performance ratios that outperform the average ratio for all European countries.

Passenger trains have two travel classes: 1st class, sometimes with larger windows (e.g. in the Gotthard Panorama Express), and 2nd class. Long-distance trains feature an on-board restaurant (or at least a vending machine) in the middle of the train and sometimes a "kids area" at one end of the train. Rail and most other modes of public transport operate under clock-face scheduling. There is a national integrated ticketing system for rail, bus and other modes of transport, grouped in tariff networks. The Swiss Travel Pass facilitates travel by train, bus and boat for tourists.

Switzerland is a member of the International Union of Railways (UIC). The UIC Country Code for Switzerland is 85.

== Standard-gauge railways ==
Detail from the map of Europe's high-speed rail lines, showing the Swiss high-speed rail network (colored) and maximum speeds.
Max operational speed 310-320 km/h
Max operational speed 270-300 km/h
Max operational speed 240-260 km/h
Max operational speed 200-230 km/h
Under construction for max operational speed ≥ 200 km/h
Max operational speed < 200 km/h

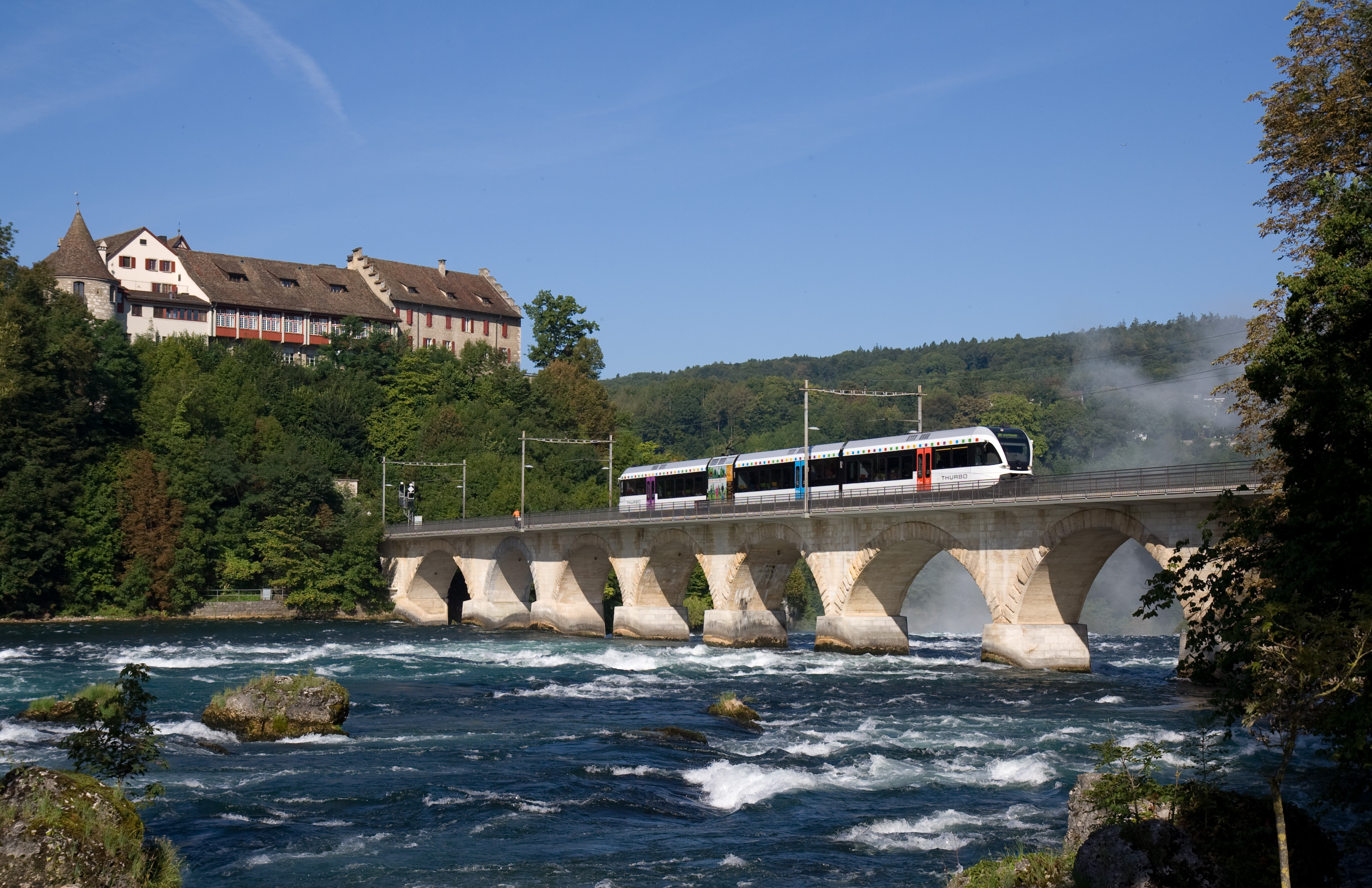
Regional train near the Rhine Falls

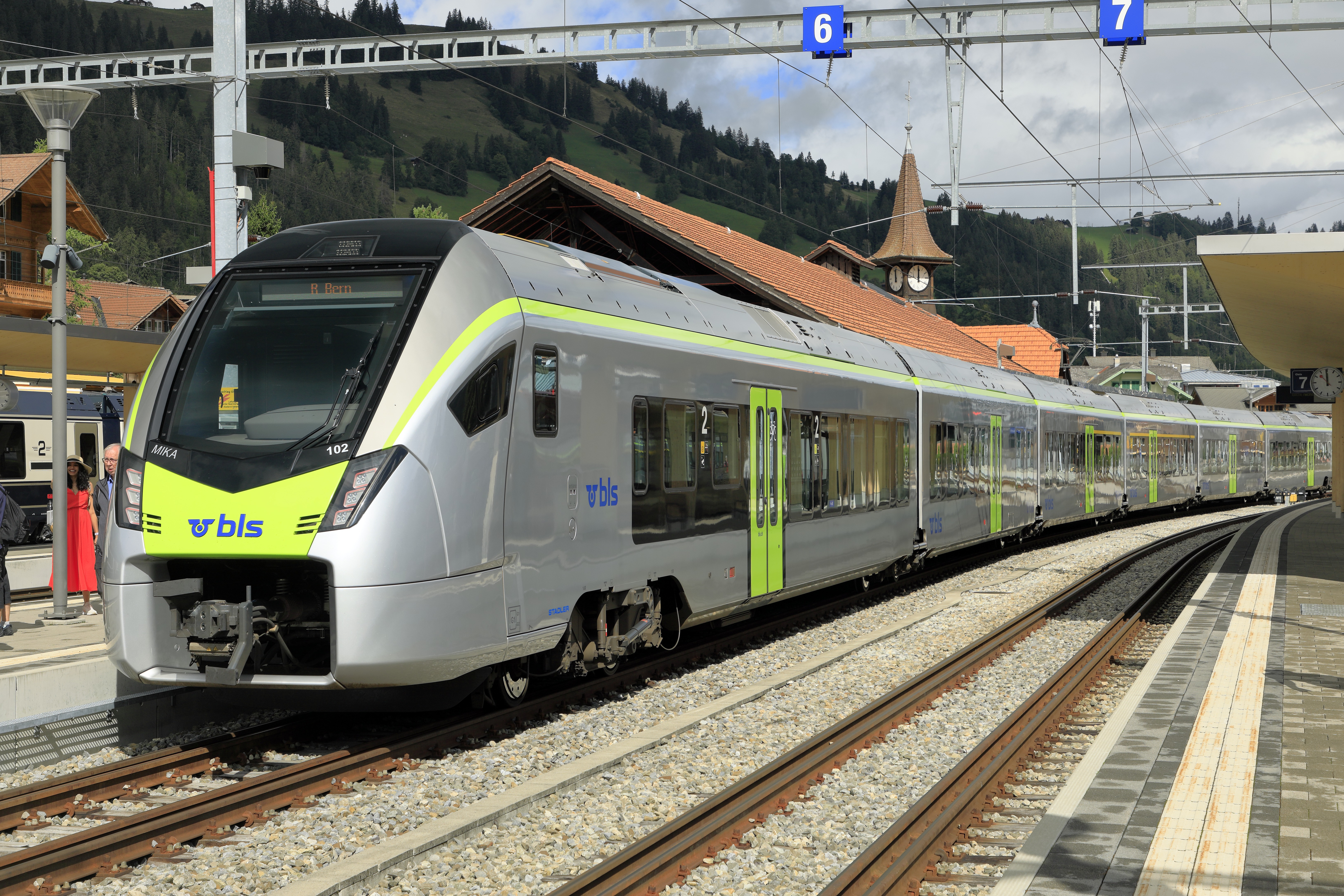
BLS MIKA in Zweisimmen

Three quarters of the Swiss rail network is at standard-gauge, comprising 3,773 km (2,344.4 mi), administered mostly by three companies. Important railway stations are the Zürich HB (398,300 passengers per day in 2023), Bern (175,400 ppd), Lucerne (99,400 ppd), Winterthur (99,100 ppd), Basel SBB (98,600 ppd), Lausanne (96,700 ppd), Zürich Oerlikon (82,200 ppd), and Geneva (79,500 ppd). The main operators of the standard gauge railway lines are Swiss Federal Railways (SBB CFF FFS), BLS, and Südostbahn (SOB). Other standard gauge operators are CJ, SZU, TPF and TransN.

=== Swiss Federal Railways ===
Swiss Federal Railways (German: SBB, French: CFF, Italian: FFS) is the largest railway company in Switzerland and handles most of national and international traffic. It operates the central east–west track in the Swiss Plateau area serving all larger Swiss cities and many smaller ones, and the north–south routes through the Alps via the Gotthard Line through the Gotthard Base Tunnel (Milano-Chiasso-Lugano-Luzern/Zürich-Basel line) and the Simplon Tunnel (Domodossola to Brig-Lausanne-Geneva line). It operates most long-distance services, including EuroCity (EC), InterCity (IC, domestic only), InterRegio (IR) and RegioExpress (RE) services. SBB and its subsidiaries (e.g. Thurbo, RegionAlps) also runs many Regio (R) and S-Bahn (S) lines. Its subsidiary SBB GmbH operates regional trains serving stations in Germany, including two lines located entirely in Germany, near the border with Switzerland. SBB Cargo handles freight operations.

- Total route length: 3,173 km (1,971.6 mi).

=== BLS ===
The BLS AG (short for Bern-Lötschberg-Simplon) operates 10% of the Swiss standard-gauge network. It manages the second major Alpine route (Bern-Brig), via both Lötschberg tunnels (base and summit) and connection at Brig with SBB's Simplon Tunnel to Italy. BLS operates InterRegio (IR), RegioExpress (RE, one service extends to Italy) and Regio (R) services. It also operates S-Bahn (S) trains for Bern S-Bahn and Lucerne S-Bahn. Freight trains are operated by its subsidiary BLS Cargo.

- Total route length: 436 km (270.9 mi).

=== SOB ===
The Schweizerische Südostbahn AG (SOB) owns railway lines in Central and Eastern Switzerland. It operates services over its own network and lines owned by SBB, partly as joint-ventures. Since the early 1990s, it operates a long-distance service between St. Gallen (Romanshorn until 2013) and Lucerne under the name Voralpen Express. This InterRegio (IR) service runs hourly via Herisau, the main town of the canton of Appenzell Ausserrhoden, the Toggenburg valley, the lakeside dam on Lake Zürich, the high moorland of Rothenthurm, Lake Zug and Lake Lucerne. Since 2020, the SOB also operates the Treno Gottardo over the old Gotthard railway between Basel SBB/Zürich HB and Locarno, and since 2021 the Aare Linth between Bern and Chur (both are IR services). SOB also runs some S-Bahn (S) services of Lucerne S-Bahn, St. Gallen S-Bahn and Zürich S-Bahn.

- Total route length: 147 km (91.3 mi), of which 123 km (76.4 mi) are their own.

=== Rail links to other countries ===
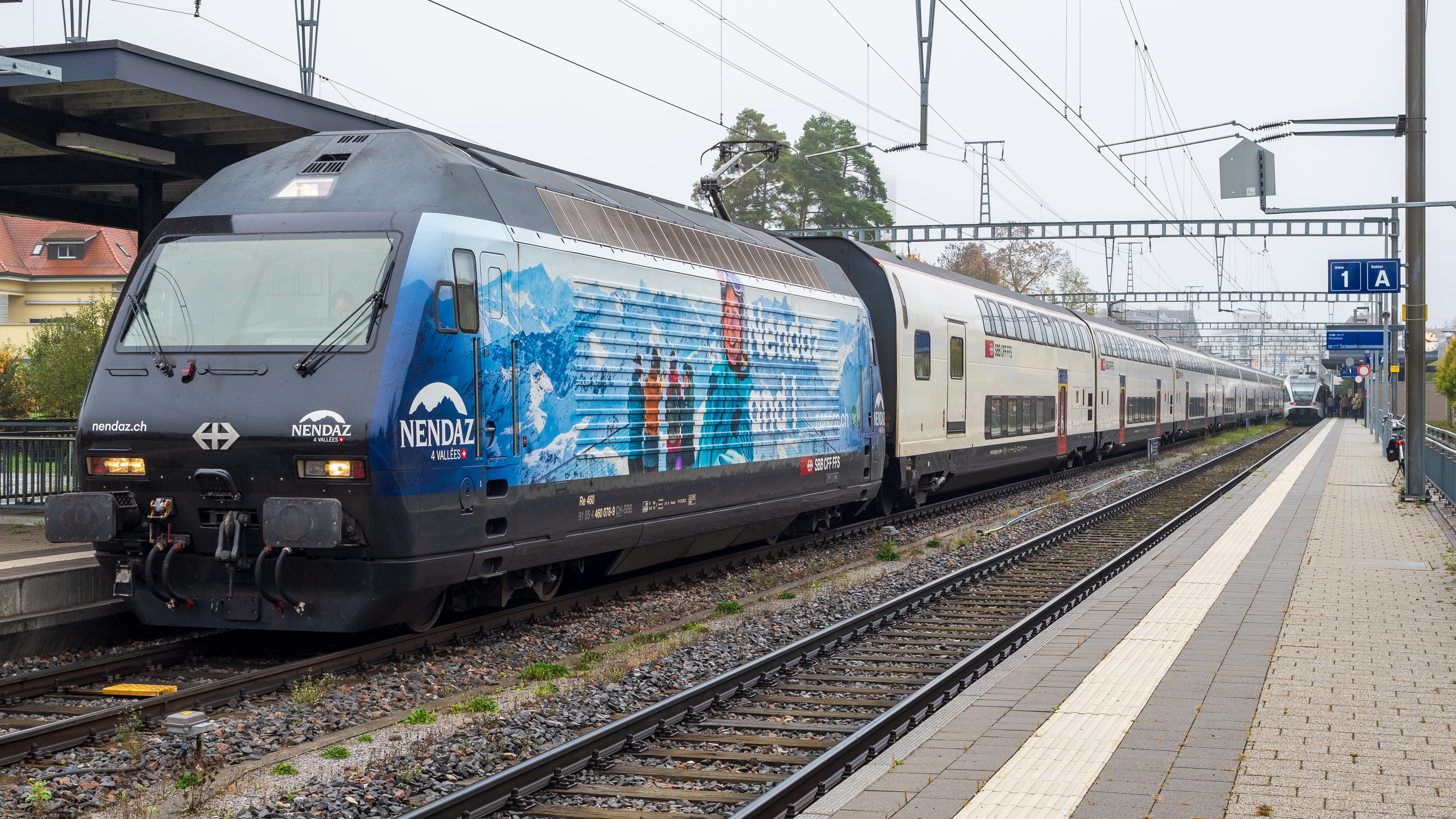
Special livery Re 460 locomotive of SBB CFF FFS hauling IC 2000 coaches

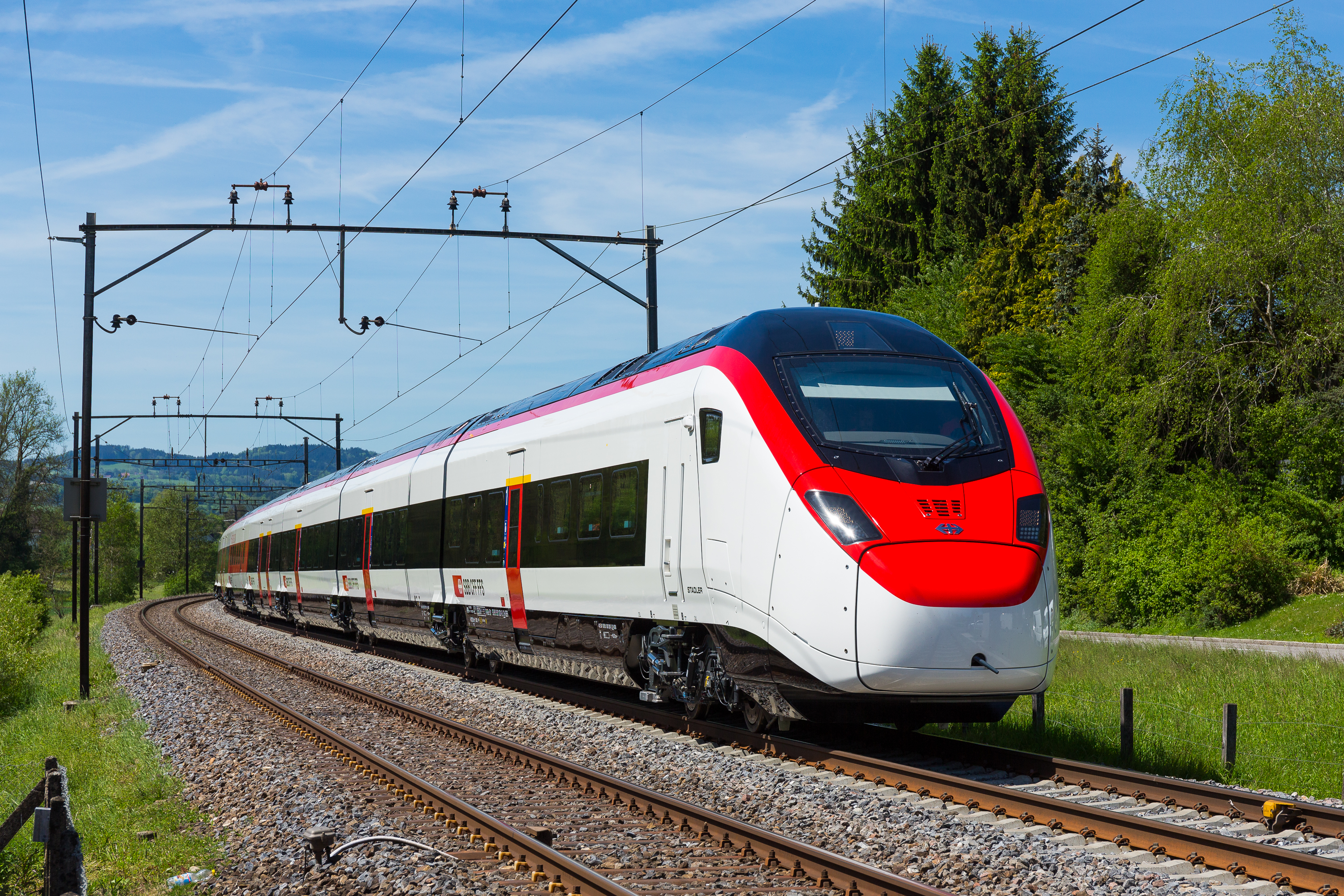
Operated by the Swiss Federal Railways, the EC 250 Giruno provides international connections across the Alps through the 57 kilometre-long Gotthard Base Tunnel

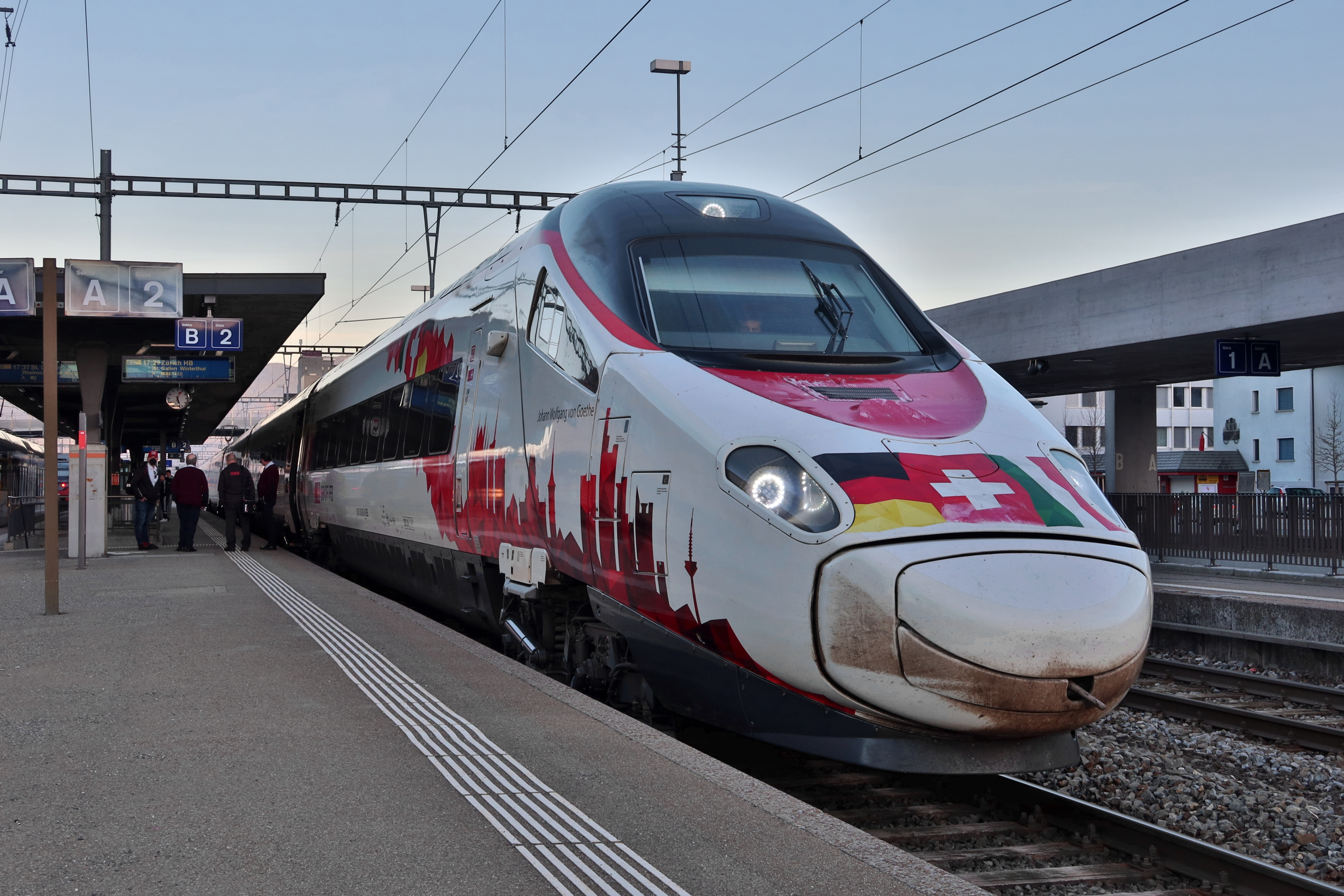
Special livery New Pendolino operating as EuroCity to Germany and Italy

- Standard gauge 1,435 mm (4 ft 8 1/2 in)
  - Austria – same voltage 15 kV, 16.7 Hz AC
  - France – voltage change 15 kV, 16.7 Hz AC / 25 kV, 50 Hz AC or 1,500 V DC
  - Germany – same voltage 15 kV, 16.7 Hz AC
  - Italy – voltage change 15 kV, 16.7 Hz AC / 3 kV DC
  - Liechtenstein – same voltage 15 kV, 16.7 Hz AC

Although Austria, Germany and Liechtenstein all use the same voltage as Switzerland, dedicated types of locomotives are necessary due to Switzerland using narrower pantographs.

Germany

Several railway lines cross the Germany–Switzerland border. The most important one is the Mannheim–Basel line, which links stations in Germany with Basel Badischer Bahnhof in the Swiss city of Basel. This station is also the western terminus of the High Rhine Railway, which runs east–west along the High Rhine and across the Swiss canton of Schaffhausen, and of the Wiese Valley Railway to Zell (Wiesental). Stations along these lines, including those in Switzerland, are owned by the German BEV, except Schaffhausen railway station, which is jointly owned with Swiss Federal Railways (SBB). Other cross-border lines include the Eglisau–Neuhausen railway, corresponding to the shortest route between Zürich HB and Schaffhausen, which passes over German territory with two active railway stations (Jestetten, Lottstetten), both owned and operated by SBB (and its subsidiary Thurbo). Another railway line connects the border stations of Koblenz (Switzerland) and Waldshut (Germany) via a bridge over the High Rhine. A loop of the Lake Line links Switzerland with the German border city of Konstanz on Lake Constance. Another railway line, the Etzwilen–Singen railway, is only used by heritage trains.

Deutsche Bahn (DB) operates long-distance trains from Germany to Swiss cities, including Intercity-Express (ICE) services to Basel SBB, Zürich HB, Bern, Chur and Interlaken Ost. DB also operates an InterCity (IC) service between Zürich HB and Stuttgart Hbf, and an Interregio-Express (IRE) over the High Rhine line between Basel Badischer Bahnhof and Friedrichshafen Hafen. On the other hand, SBB runs EuroCity (EC) services between Zürich HB and München Hbf, via Bregenz in Austria. There is also one InterRegio (IR) line and one RegioExpress (RE) line with Konstanz as their terminus. SBB GmbH, SBB's German subsidiary, also operates a regional line, named the Seehas, and one line of Basel S-Bahn entirely on German territory close to the Swiss border.

France

There are a few railway lines crossing the France–Switzerland border, the most-frequented ones being the Lyon–Geneva railway and the Strasbourg–Basel railway lines. TGV Lyria, a joint-venture between SBB and the French SNCF, operates high-speed trains from Paris or southern France to Genève-Cornavin and Lausanne or Basel SBB and Zürich HB. Some RegioExpress (RE) trains of SBB also connect with stations in France. The Léman Express is a commuter rail system linking Geneva with stations in Switzerland and France. Some cross-border regional trains services are provided by TER.

Austria and Liechtenstein

Only one standard gauge railway line crosses the Austria–Switzerland border, the St. Margrethen–Lauterach line, while another one, the Feldkirch–Buchs railway line, connects the two countries via the Principality of Liechtenstein. Austrian Federal Railways (ÖBB) operates the Railjet and the Transalpin (an EC service) between Zürich HB and several destinations in Austria. The services run via Buchs SG and through Liechtenstein (without stopping) to either Wien Hbf or Graz Hbf and call, among others, at Innsbruck Hbf and Salzburg Hbf. The other line is used by EC trains (Zürich–Munich) and regional trains of Bodensee S-Bahn.

Rail transport to Liechtenstein is provided by Vorarlberg S-Bahn, operated by ÖBB. There are also bus links between Swiss railway stations and Liechtenstein.

Italy

The main railway lines linking Switzerland with Italy are the Gotthard railway and the Simplon railway. SBB and the Italian Trenitalia jointly operate EC services across the Italy–Switzerland border. These services run between Genève-Cornavin and Milano Centrale or even Venezia Santa Lucia via the Simplon Tunnel. Between Basel and Milan via Bern and the Lötschberg Base and Simplon Tunnels, and between Zürich HB and Milan via the Gotthard route. These routes were previously operated by Cisalpino. Other standard-gauge lines crossing the border are operated by regional trains of TILO.

Night trains

There are also EuroNight (EN) services between Switzerland and other European countries. The Austrian ÖBB operates Nightjet (NJ) trains between Swiss, Austrian, Dutch and German destinations.

== Narrow-gauge railways ==
Due to lack of space, the trains partly run on the street or right next to it.

=== RhB and MGB ===
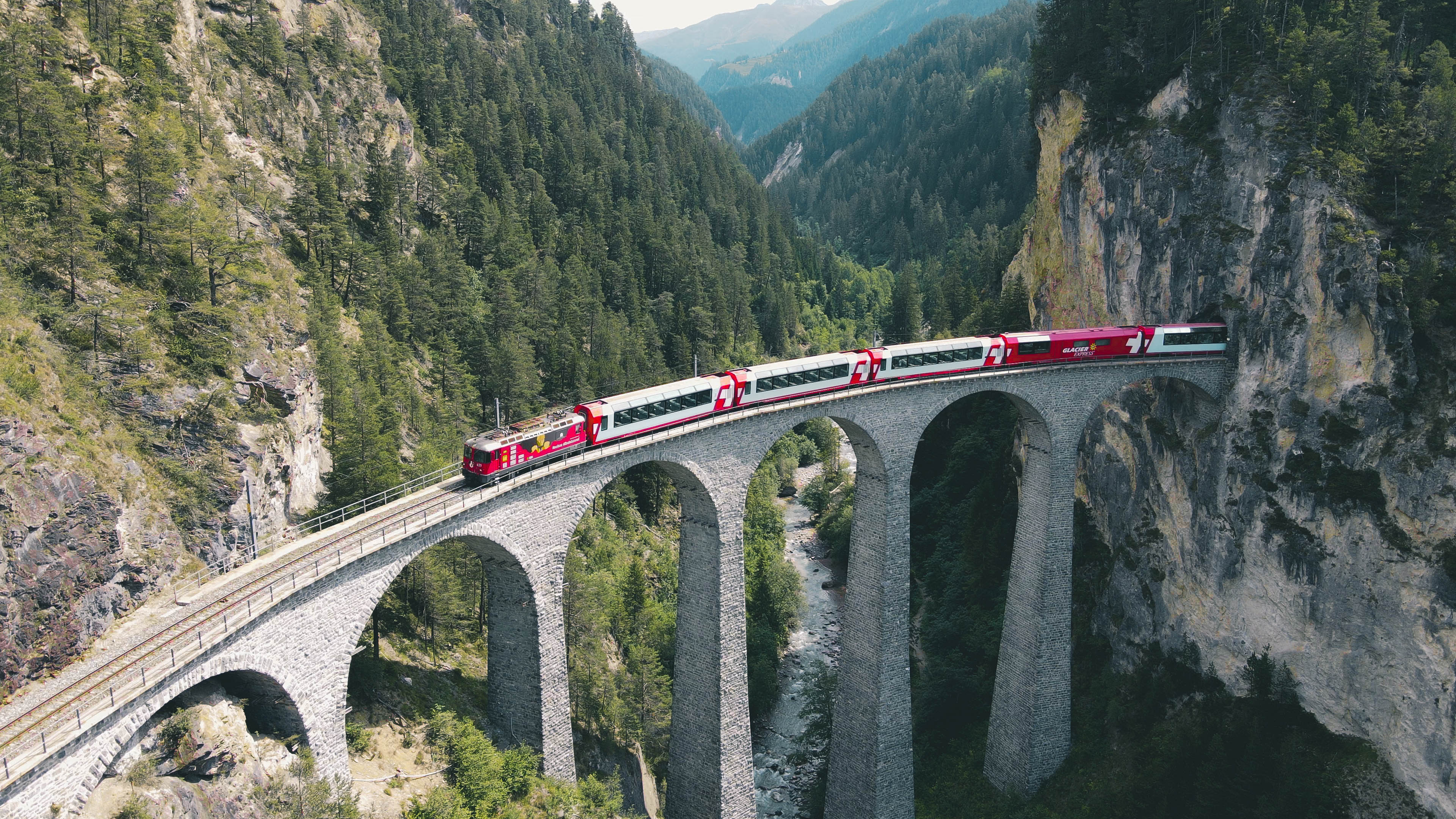
The Glacier Express (here on the Landwasser Viaduct) is the longest long-distance train in Switzerland. It runs from Zermatt (Valais) to St. Moritz (Grisons), on both the MGB and RhB networks

The Rhätische Bahn (RhB), lit. 'Rhaetian Railway', is the longest metre-gauge railway network in Switzerland. Located in the eastern Swiss Alps, it links Arosa, Disentis, Davos and St. Moritz with Chur in the canton of Grisons (Graubünden). One line, operated by the Bernina Express (a Panorama Express, PE), crosses the Italy–Switzerland border to Tirano in the Valtellina valley. The Bernina Pass is the highest point on this line, at an altitude of 2,253 m (7,392 ft). It is also the highest rail crossing in Europe. Chur and Landquart are RhB's rail junctions with the Swiss Federal Railways' standard gauge network. RhB's lines pass through the Landquart, Vorderrhein and upper Alpine Rhine valleys and several side valleys, as well as the Engadine, the upper valley of the river Inn. The network has a total length of 366 km (227 mi).

The Matterhorn Gotthard Bahn (MGB), lit. 'Matterhorn Gotthard Railway', was founded in 2003 through the merger of the Furka Oberalp Bahn (FO) with the Brig–Zermatt Bahn (BVZ; BVZ means Brig–Visp–Zermatt). The former Furka Oberalp Bahn was a metre-gauge railway in the high southern Alps. Its name refers to two passes, the Furka Pass and the Oberalp Pass. The Furka Pass lies at the upper end of the Rhône valley. The Oberalp Pass is the highest point on this line at 2,033 m (6,670 ft) above sea level, and lies at the upper end of the Rhine valley. The line runs from Disentis/Mustér to Brig. At Andermatt, the line connects with the former Schöllenenbahn to Göschenen on the standard gauge Gotthard Railway of Swiss Federal Railways. Brig in the canton of Valais is a rail junction with standard gauge lines of Swiss Federal Railways and BLS. It sits at the north end of the Simplon Tunnel on the Milan–Lausanne line and Milan–Bern line. The total length of the FO railway was 100 km (62 mi). The former Brig–Zermatt Bahn was a short line between Brig and Zermatt. It passes through the valleys of the Vispa and Matter Vispa, tributaries of the Rhône. The total length of the BVZ line was 43 km (27 mi).

The Glacier Express (GEX), a Panorama Express (PE), runs on the combined route, using lines of RhB and MGB (St. Moritz - Filisur - Chur - Disentis/Mustér - Andermatt - Brig - Visp - Zermatt). A one-day trip in panoramic-view cars takes tourists from St. Moritz to Zermatt, or vice versa, through some of the most spectacular scenery of the Alps. It is the longest long-distance train service in Switzerland. The journey from Zermatt to St. Moritz takes about 8 hours.

=== Further narrow-gauge railways ===
Eastern Switzerland

The Appenzeller Bahnen (AB), lit. 'Appenzell Railways', with its total of 77 km (48 mi) of mainly metre-gauge tracks just recently combined (2006) the earlier separate Trogenerbahn from St. Gallen to Trogen, the standard-gauge railway (partial rack railway) from Rorschach to Heiden, the funicular from Rheineck to Walzenhausen, as well as the previous Appenzeller Bahnen (including another rack railway). The AB connects towns within the cantons of Appenzell Innerrhoden and Appenzell Ausserrhoden with the city of St. Gallen and other towns in the canton of St. Gallen. Since 2021, the narrow-gauge Frauenfeld–Wil railway (FWB), linking Frauenfeld in the canton of Thurgau with Wil in the canton of St. Gallen, also belongs to Appenzell Railways. All AB lines are used by services of St. Gallen S-Bahn.

Bernese Oberland and adjacent areas

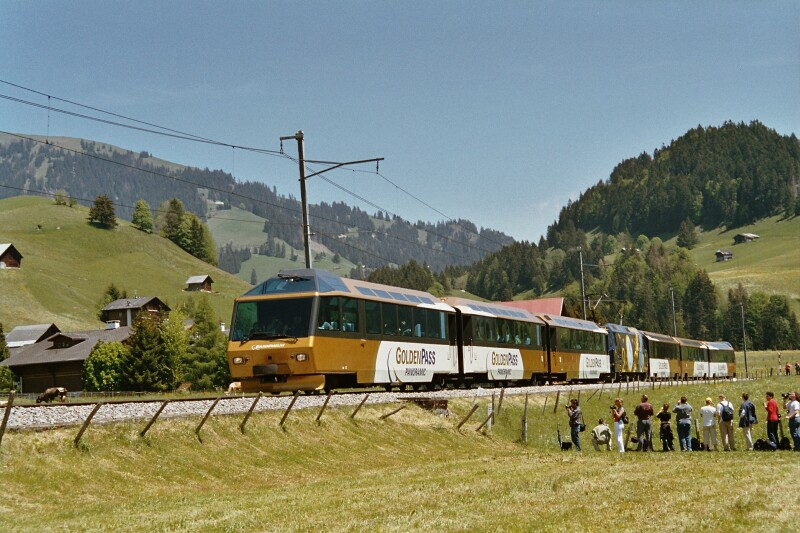
A Golden Pass train near Gstaad

The Montreux Oberland Bernois Railway (MOB) runs 75 km (47 mi) long Montreux–Lenk im Simmental line from Montreux on Lake Geneva to Zweisimmen, with a connecting line to Lenk in the Simmental. The section from Montreux to Zweisimmen, approximately 63 km (39 mi) long, is part of the "Golden Pass Panorama" trip from Montreux to Interlaken (and further to Lucerne), a trip which combines rides on the MOB, for some connections the BLS, and from Interlaken onwards the Zentralbahn (zb).

From Interlaken, the narrow-gauge Brünigbahn section of the Zentralbahn (zb) runs 74 km (46 mi) further to Lucerne. It skirts Lake Brienz and passes through the range of mountains to the north of the lake via Brünig Pass, and then drops into Obwalden (the Sarner Aa valley) to Lucerne. The zb also runs the line between Lucerne and Engelberg.

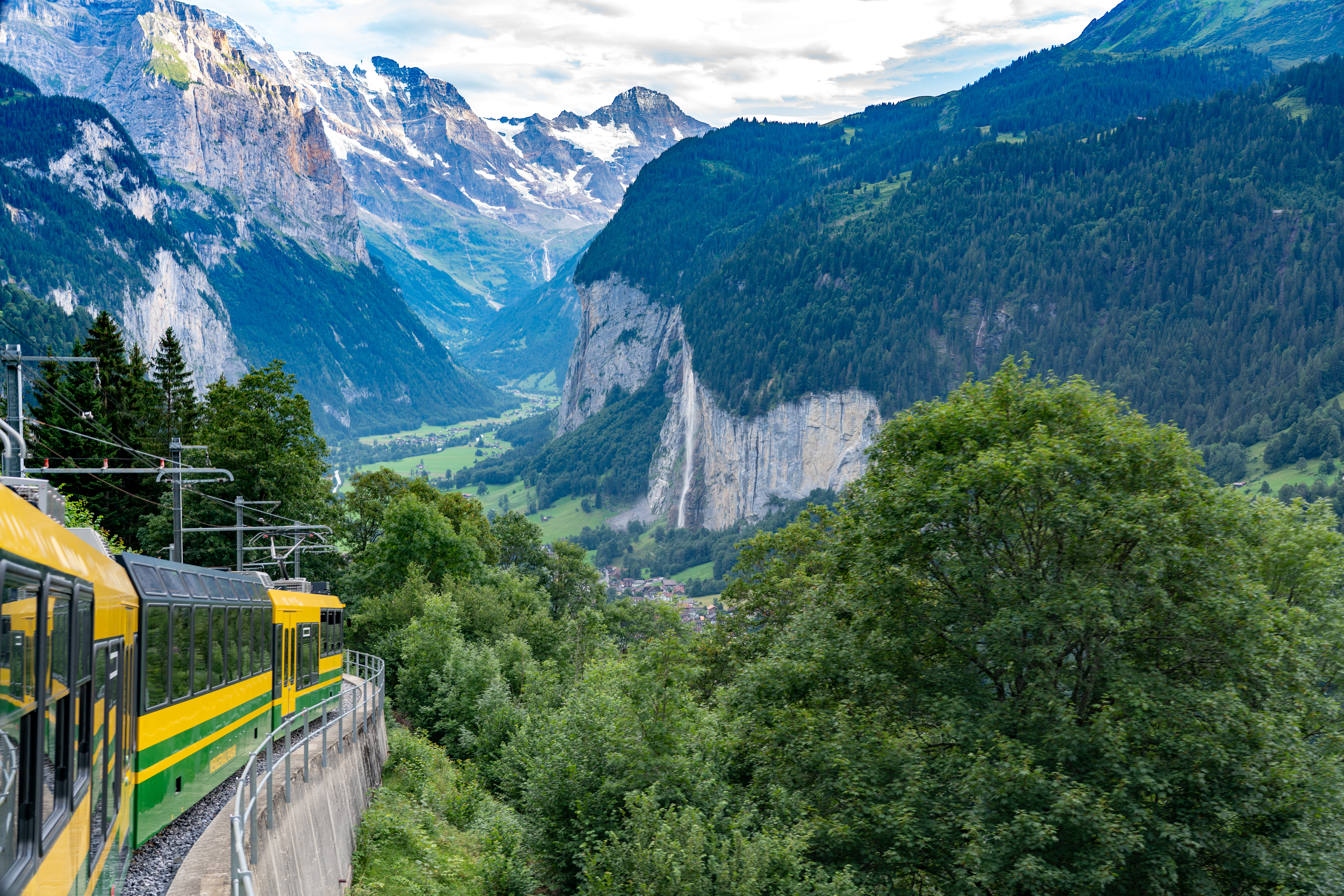
Narrow-gauge lines are renowned for their scenic views (here the WAB between Lauterbrunnen and Wengen)

The Berner Oberland Bahn (BOB) is a 24 km (15 mi) long line from Interlaken to Lauterbrunnen and Grindelwald. It begins at Interlaken Ost and divides at Zweilütschinen, about 10 km (6.2 mi) south of Interlaken. The western branch leads to Lauterbrunnen, while the eastern branch leads to Grindelwald. It is possible to make a loop by taking the Lauterbrunnen branch and returning via the Grindelwald branch. The two branches are connected by the Wengernalp Bahn.

The Wengernalpbahn (WAB) is a 19 km (12 mi) long line between the villages of Lauterbrunnen and Grindelwald, leading over the Eiger ridge at the Kleine Scheidegg junction station at Kleine Scheidegg. In the winter, this junction is a ski resort served by many lifts and trails, as well as the rail line. Skiers can ride the train from the valleys below to return to the top of the runs.

The Jungfraubahn (JB), which is also rack-and-pinion throughout, starts at Kleine Scheidegg and runs 9 km (5.6 mi) through tunnels in the Eiger and Mönch, leading to the "Jungfraujoch", a saddle between the Mönch and the Jungfrau summits. At the saddle are a visitor centre and an observatory. The Aletsch Glacier, largest in Europe, runs to the south toward the Rhône valley.

The Bergbahn Lauterbrunnen-Mürren (BLM) is 6 km (3.7 mi) long, divided into two independent parts, the first part being a cable car (which runs above the old funicular railway, which was replaced in 2006), the second an adhesion railway.

At Brienz the Brienz Rothorn Bahn (BRB), a steam-hauled rack railway, ascends to near the summit of the Brienzer Rothorn.

Western Switzerland and Valais

The Chemins de fer du Jura (CJ), the railways of the canton of Jura in northern Switzerland, is an 85 km (53 mi) long rail network of which 74 km (46 mi) is metre gauge, the remaining 11 km (6.8 mi) being standard gauge. It connects La Chaux-de-Fonds to Glovelier and Tramelan, both via Le Noirmont. Other narrow-gauge railway lines in the Swiss Jura include the La Chaux-de-Fonds–Les Ponts-de-Martel railway and Le Locle–Les Brenets line, both operated by TransN.

In the canton of Vaud, metre-gauge railways include the Chemin de fer Nyon-St-Cergue-Morez, the Chemin de fer Bière-Apples-Morges, the Chemin de fer Yverdon–Ste-Croix, the Chemin de fer Bex–Villars–Bretaye and the Chemin de fer Lausanne–Echallens–Bercher, as well as part of the longer Montreux–Lenk im Simmental line. Another railway line links Aigle with Champéry in the canton of Valais.

The Chemin de fer Martigny–Châtelard (MC) is 19 km (12 mi) long, with one rack railway section, in the canton of Valais. It runs from Martigny to Le Châtelard VS and connects with the Saint-Gervais–Vallorcine railway in France, the joint services being marketed as Mont-Blanc Express.

The Gornergrat Bahn climbs for 9 km (5.6 mi) from an elevation of 1,600 m (5,200 ft) near Zermatt station of the Zermatt RR to a 3,000 m (9,800 ft) high top station on the shoulder of the Monte Rosa Mountain. The entire route is a rack-and-pinion railway.

Ticino

The Ferrovia Lugano–Ponte Tresa (FLP), in canton Ticino, runs 12.3 km (7.6 mi) from Lugano to Ponte Tresa. The Monte Generoso railway (MG) operates between Capolago-Riva San Vitale (or Capolago Lago) and Monte Generoso.

Other

The Aargau Verkehr company operates two unconnected narrow gauge lines. The Menziken–Aarau–Schöftland line operates in the centre of the canton of Aargau as S14 service of the Aargau S-Bahn. The Bremgarten–Dietikon line operates across the border between the canton of Zürich and eastern Aargau as S17 service of the Zürich S-Bahn. The two lines have a total length of 51 kilometres (32 mi).

The Forch railway (German: Forchbahn, FB) is a meter gauge railway in the canton of Zürich that operates from Zürich Stadelhofen FB to Esslingen as S18 service of the Zürich S-Bahn. It uses the Zürich tram tracks between Stadelhofen and Zürich Rehalp, while operating on its own tracks outside of the city of Zürich. It is owned and operated by the Forchbahn AG.

Regionalverkehr Bern-Solothurn (RBS) operates three services for Bern S-Bahn on meter gauge lines: the S7 on the Worb Dorf–Worblaufen line, the S8 on the Solothurn–Worblaufen line and the S9 on the Zollikofen–Bern line.

Aare Seeland mobil (ASM) operates two S-Bahn services (S11, S12) on three meter gauge railway lines in the cantons of Bern and Solothurn: the Langenthal–Oensingen, the Langenthal–Melchnau and the Solothurn–Niederbipp lines.

The Waldenburg railway links Liestal with Waldenburg in the canton of Basel-Landschaft. Since 2016, it is operated by line 19 of Baselland Transport (BLT).

=== Narrow-gauge links to adjacent countries ===
- France – 1,000 mm / 3 ft 3 3/8 in metre gauge:
  - Martigny–Châtelard Railway / Saint-Gervais–Vallorcine railway (Mont-Blanc Express), partially a rack railway
- Italy – 1,000 mm / 3 ft 3 3/8 in metre gauge:
  - Bernina Railway (Rhaetian Railway), break-of-gauge and voltage change at Tirano
  - Domodossola–Locarno railway line (FART (ferrovie autolinee regionali ticinesi)) through the Swiss Centovalli and Italian Valle Vigezzo
- Austria – 750 mm / 2 ft 5 1/2 in gauge:
  - The International Rhine Regulation Railway, a former industrial railway (now a heritage railway) along and across the Alpine Rhine

== Urban rail ==
Urban rail transit in Switzerland includes trams and light rail in several cities, commuter rail systems centered around cities (known as S-Bahn or RER), a single, small metro system and funiculars. Plans for a rapid transit in Zürich, Switzerland's largest city, were discontinued after a referendum.

=== Trams ===
There are trams operating on nine systems in seven Swiss cities. Street-running tramways are nearly all 1,000 mm (3 ft 3 3/8 in). The Chemin de fer Bex–Villars–Bretaye (BVB) in Bex is more of a mixed interurban light rail line connected to a rack railway but it does have some street running portions, particularly in Bex where the BVB operates along the right of way of a tramway system originally built in the 1890s. Also the Trogenerbahn operated by Appenzell Railways (AB) operates on streets in the city of St. Gallen as well as the Frauenfeld–Wil-Bahn (FWB) in the city of Frauenfeld the Forchbahn in the city of Zürich and the Chur–Arosa-Bahn in the city of Chur.

City	System	Start of electric operations	Gauge	notes
Basel	Basler Verkehrs-Betriebe (BVB)	6 May 1892	1,000 mm (3 ft 3 3/8 in) metre gauge	8 lines
Basel	Baselland Transport (BLT)	6 October 1902	1,000 mm (3 ft 3 3/8 in) metre gauge	4 lines, 65.2 km (40.5 mi), 100 trams, serves suburbs
Bern	Städtische Verkehrsbetriebe Bern	1 July 1902	1,000 mm (3 ft 3 3/8 in) metre gauge	5 lines
Bex	Bex–Villars–Bretaye railway (BVB)	1898	1,000 mm (3 ft 3 3/8 in) metre gauge	Connects to rack railway in Villars-sur-Ollon
Geneva	Trams in Geneva	22 September 1894	1,000 mm (3 ft 3 3/8 in) metre gauge	5 lines
Lausanne	Lausanne Metro Line M1	2 June 1991	1,435 mm (4 ft 8 1/2 in) standard gauge	Part of Switzerland's only metro system
Neuchâtel	Trams in Neuchâtel	16 May 1897	1,000 mm (3 ft 3 3/8 in) metre gauge	1 line
Zürich	Trams in Zürich	8 March 1894	1,000 mm (3 ft 3 3/8 in) metre gauge	Operated by Verkehrsbetriebe Zürich (VBZ)
Zürich	Stadtbahn Glattal	10 December 2006	1,000 mm (3 ft 3 3/8 in) metre gauge	Operated by VBZ and Verkehrsbetriebe Glattal (VBG)
Zürich	Limmattalbahn	11 December 2022	1,000 mm (3 ft 3 3/8 in) metre gauge	Its western terminus is in the canton of Aargau

=== S-Bahn ===
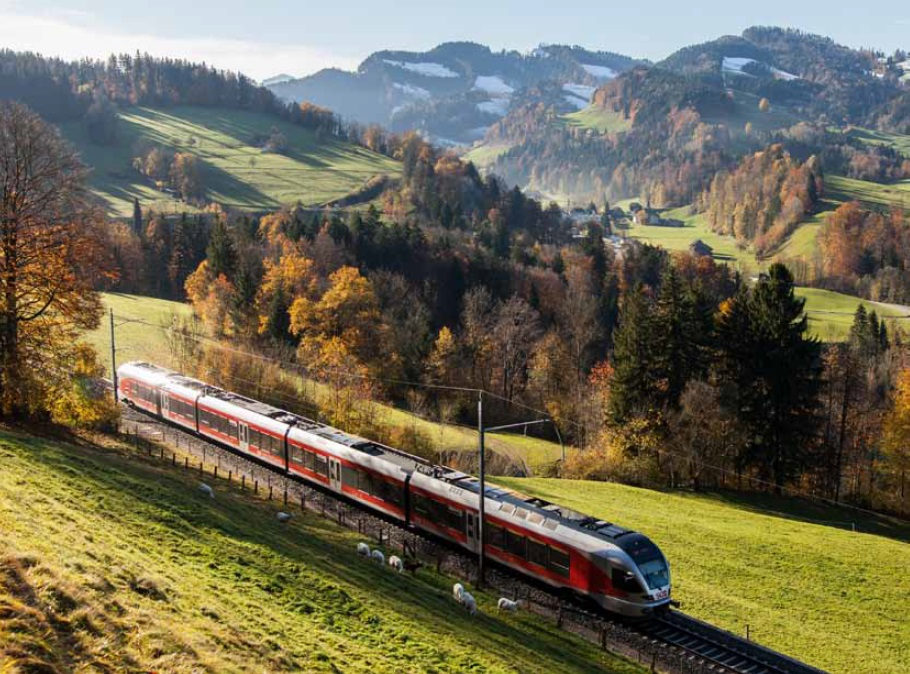
SOB Stadler FLIRT in Toggenburg operating as S4 service for St. Gallen S-Bahn

In the German-speaking part of Switzerland, suburban and regional commuter rail service is today known as S-Bahn. Clock-face scheduling in commuter rail has been first put in place on the line Worb Dorf–Worblaufen near Bern in 1964. In 1968, the Goldcoast Express on the right side of Lake Zürich followed. In 1982, clock-face scheduling was introduced all over Switzerland. The term S-Bahn has been used since 1990 for the Zürich S-Bahn, since 1995 for Bern S-Bahn and since 1997 for the Basel S-Bahn. Other S-Bahn services include the Lucerne S-Bahn, St. Gallen S-Bahn, Aargau S-Bahn, Chur S-Bahn and Schaffhausen S-Bahn. Additionally, other terms for commuter rail are in use, like Stadtbahn Zug. S-Bahn services are typically numbered and use the S-prefix (S#).

Commuter rail networks in the French-speaking part are generally known as RER (Réseau Express Régional), such as around Fribourg (RER Fribourg), Lausanne (RER Vaud) and Porrentruy (RER Jura), whereas in the region of Geneva the term is Léman Express. In the canton of Valais, RegionAlps offers S-Bahn services, while in the canton of Ticino such services are provided by TILO.

The commuter rail networks of Zürich, Basel, St. Gallen, Geneva, Schaffhausen and Ticino provide also cross-border transportation services into Austria, Germany, France and Italy, respectively. The Austrian Vorarlberg S-Bahn operates services with Swiss border stations as their terminus, with one service operating through Liechtenstein. The Italian Milan S Lines includes a service operating until the Swiss border station of Chiasso. The Bodensee S-Bahn groups several S-Bahn services around Lake Constance (Bodensee) in Switzerland, Austria and Germany.

== Tourist railways ==
- List of heritage railways and funiculars in Switzerland
- List of mountain railways in Switzerland
- Panorama Express

== Rolling stock ==
=== Naming ===
Since the naming of the Class Ae 6/6 locomotives (nicknamed Kantonslokomotiven, lit. 'cantonal locomotives'), it has become common customs for Swiss railway companies to name their locomotives and multiple units (MU). Rolling stock named after cantons or municipalities often also bear the respective coat of arms. The following is a list of locomotives and MUs of the three main operators that are named.

Operator	Vehicle	Named after
BLS	Re 465	Most are named after mountains in Switzerland.
BLS	RABe 515	Twelve electric MUs are named after cities, each featuring its respective coat of arms.
BLS	RABe 525	Mostly named after municipalities (with coat of arms) and rivers in the canton of Bern.
BLS	RABe 528	Twelve MUs are named, mostly after Swiss municipalities, with one named after an Italian commune.
BLS	RABe 535	Eleven electric MUs are named after municipalities, each featuring its respective coat of arms.
SBB CFF FFS	Ae 6/6	Twenty-six locomotives are named after Swiss cantons, while the rest are named after municipalities. Coat of arms are displayed on the sides, with the Swiss coat of arms on the fronts.
SBB CFF FFS	Re 420	Only three locomotives are named: two after municipalities (with their respective coat of arms on the sides) and one after Depot G (a depot in Zurich). Most bear the Swiss coat of arms on the front, except for former Swiss Express locomotives, which display the SBB logo.
SBB CFF FFS	Re 450	All are named, mostly after municipalities in the Zurich Metropolitan Area, with one named after Vienna and another after Osaka. Coat of arms are shown on both sides of each engine.
SBB CFF FFS	Re 460	Most are named after regions, rivers, mountains, events, or companies in Switzerland, with some also named after places abroad.
SBB CFF FFS	Re 620	All are named after Swiss municipalities and bear the Swiss coat of arms on the front.
SBB CFF FFS	RABe 501	Twenty-six are named after Swiss cantons, while the rest are named after places in Switzerland, with two named after Italian provinces.
SBB CFF FFS	RAB(D)e 502	Some are named, mostly after Swiss cities.
SBB CFF FFS	RABe 511	Fourteen electric MUs are named, mostly after Swiss cantons and municipalities, with one named after Berlin, all featuring their respective coat of arms.
SBB CFF FFS	RABe 514	Some are named, mainly after Swiss municipalities.
SBB CFF FFS	RABDe 500	Most are named after Swiss scholars, artists, writers, politicians, engineers, and architects.
SOB	RABe 526	All of SOB's Stadler Flirt trains (Series 1–3) are named after mountains along routes operated by the company.

== Integration of services ==
=== Between rail services ===
Services on the Swiss railway network are integrated with each other and with other modes of public transport, such as local railways, buses, boats/ferries and cable transports, often either in direct proximity or short walking distance, to minimise transfer times. Unlike its European neighbours, Switzerland has not developed a comprehensive high-speed rail network, with the running speed on high-speed lines, the Rothrist–Mattstetten line and Gotthard Base Tunnel, being 200 km/h (120 mph) and 230 km/h (140 mph), respectively. Instead the priority is not so much the speeding up of trains between cities, but the reduction of connection times through the nodal system. Journey times on main lines between hubs are multiples of 15 minutes so that on the hour or half-hour all trains stand in the nodal stations at the same time, thus minimising connection times. Indeed, the above-mentioned Rothrist–Mattstetten line reduces journey times from Bern to Zurich HB from 72 minutes to 57 minutes, in keeping with the clock-face scheduling.

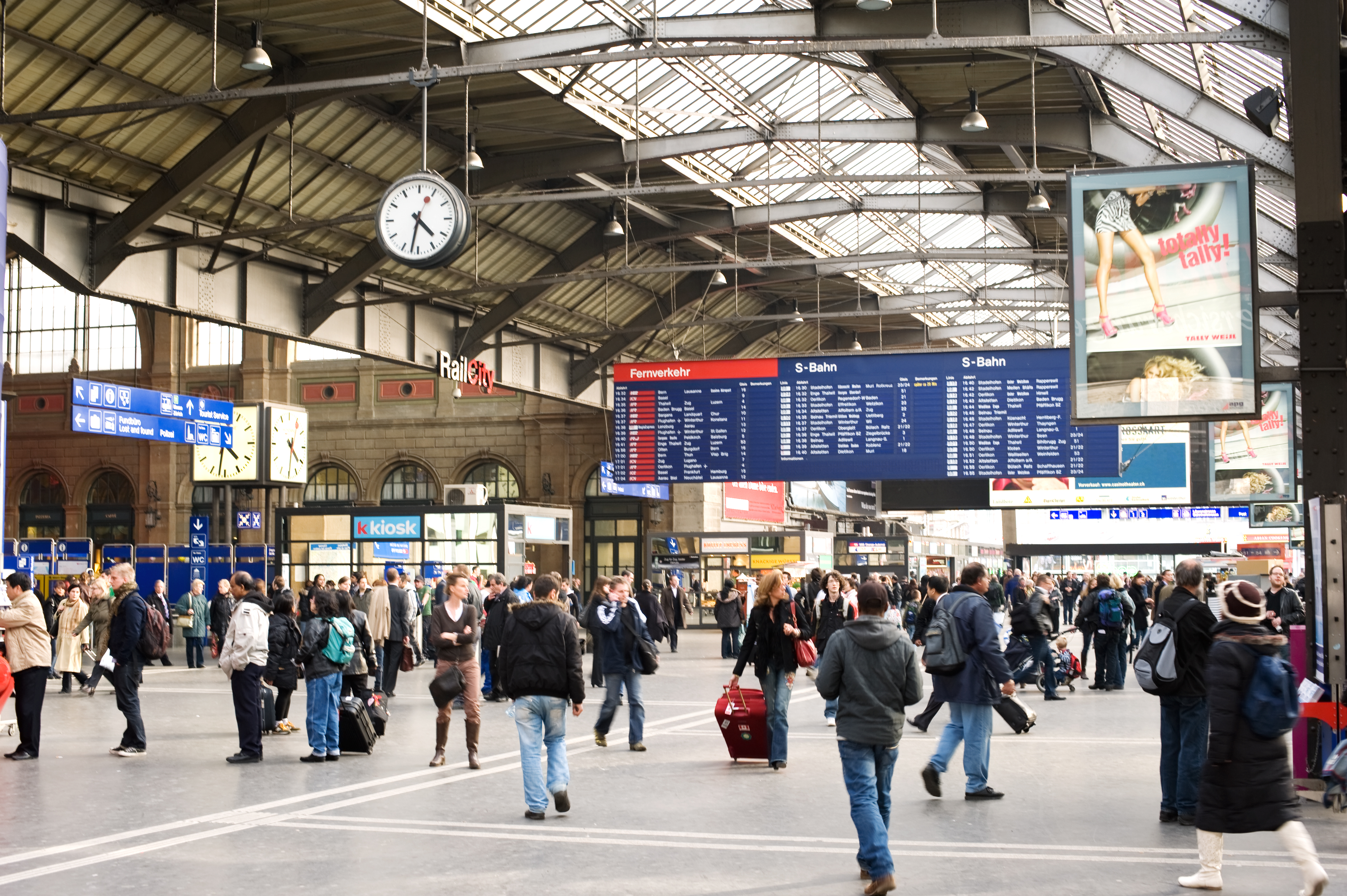
SBB Clock and main timetable display at Zürich HB. Note the national and international departures after 16:30 and 17:00

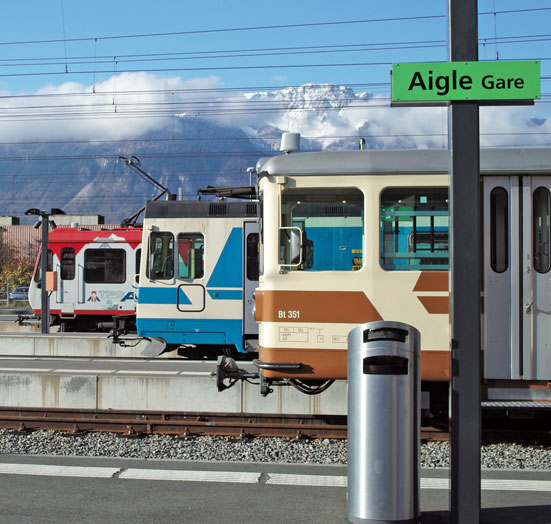
Regional trains waiting at Aigle railway station

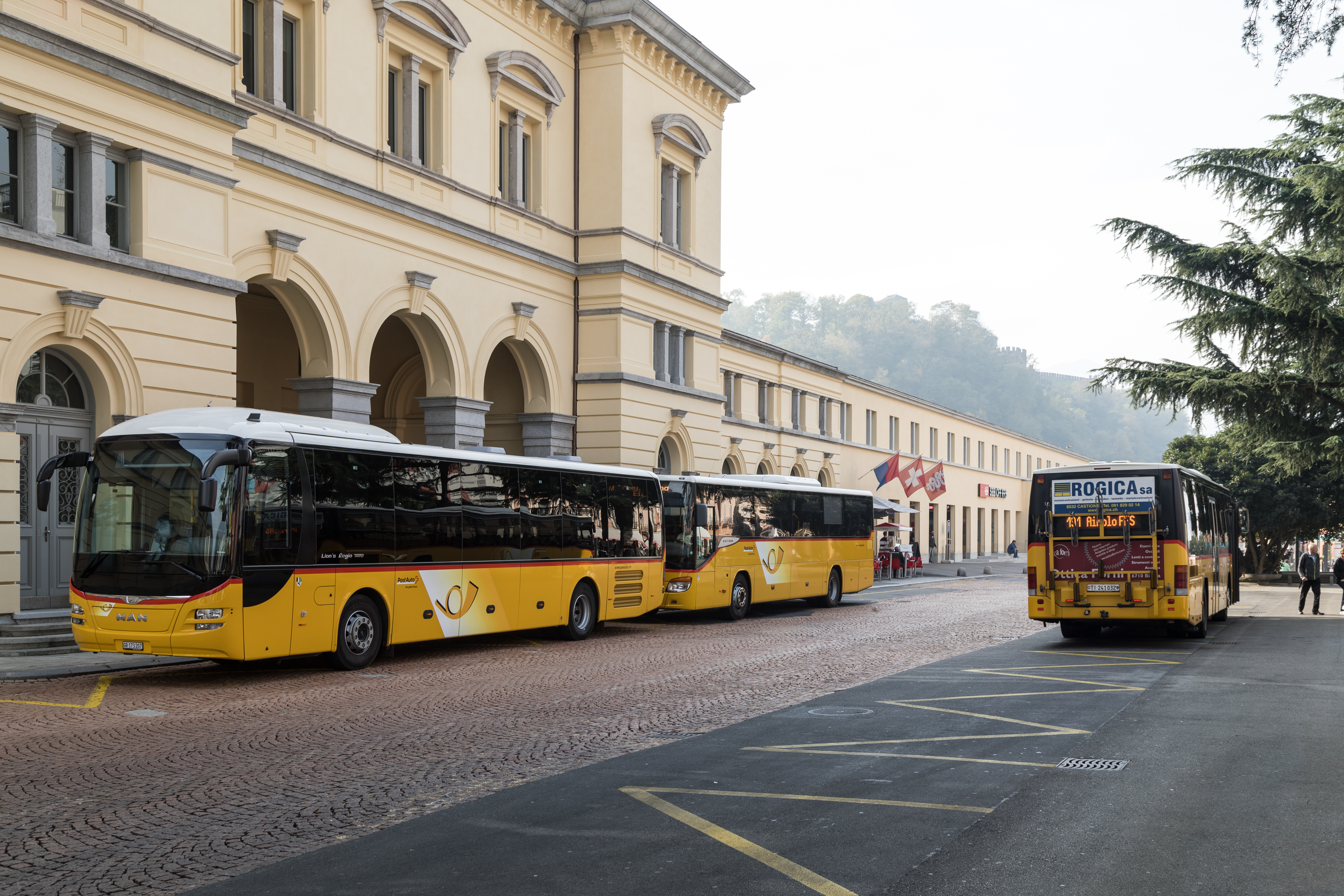
Postal buses waiting outside Bellinzona railway station

=== Between modes of public transport ===
- Rail timetables are integrated with the extensive network of postal buses (branded as PostBus, French: CarPostal, German: PostAuto, Italian: AutoPostale), which serve both plain and high mountain villages, as well as with many other Swiss bus companies. For example, on postal bus line 12.381 the 10:35 from the mountain village of Les Haudères is planned to arrive in the regional city of Sion at 11:20 where a train departs the station (located next to the bus station) at 11:24 for Visp. Indeed, it is a familiar sight to for the postal cars to be already lined up outside the station for the arriving train. From this perspective, the Swiss rail network functions as the core of a wider public transport network.

Other modes of transport concerned by the integrated timetable are:

- Boats/ferries: for example at Capolago Lago (SNL), Flüelen (SGV), Kreuzlingen Hafen (URh), Lucerne (SGV), Montreux (CGN), Rapperswil (ZSG), Romanshorn, Thun
- Cable cars: for instance at Fiesch, Jakobsbad, Le Châble VS, Unterterzen, Wasserauen
- Funiculars (for example at Cossonay-Penthalaz, Linthal Braunwaldbahn, Lugano Paradiso, Vevey-Funi, Wabern bei Bern) and other mountain railways (for instance at Alpnachstad, Arth-Goldau, Göschenen)
- Metro: at Lausanne, Lausanne-Flon, Renens
- Heritage railways: at Bauma, Etzwilen, Hinwil

=== Links to airports ===
- The two main airports, Zürich Airport and Geneva Airport, both have their own subterranean railway stations, Zürich Airport (Zürich Flughafen) and Geneva Airport (Genève Aeroport). Zürich Airport also has tram links to the city. Other airports have bus links to/from nearby railway stations: EuroAirport Basel Mulhouse Freiburg with Basel SBB, Bern Airport with Belp, St. Gallen–Altenrhein Airport with Rheineck and Sion Airport with Sion. Lugano Airport is close to Agno.

== Integration with private transport ==
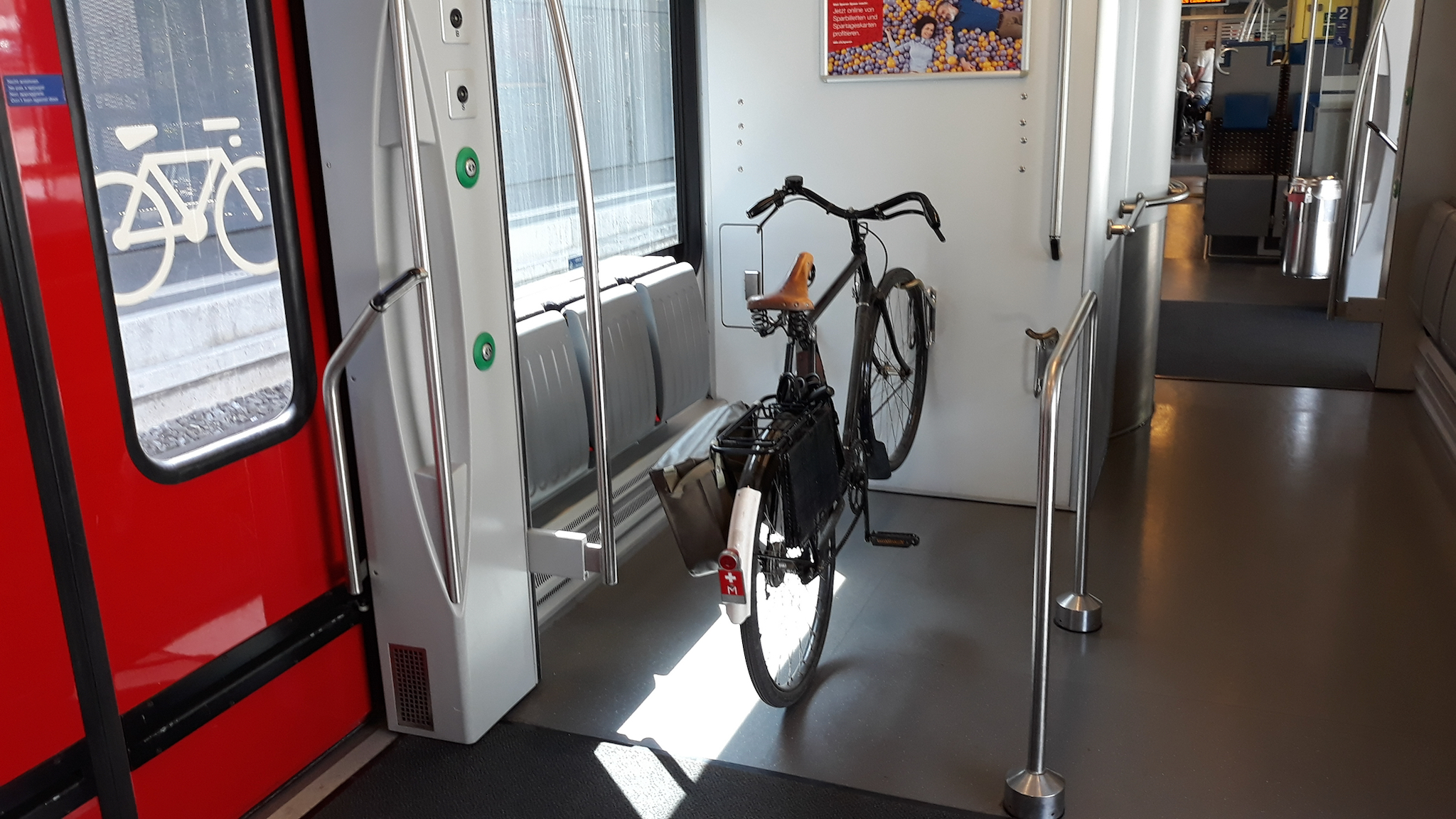
Bicycle transport on a TILO train

- About 600 railway stations feature park and ride, known as P+Rail in Switzerland, which allows commuting partly by private and partly by public transport. Mobility is a cooperative for car sharing. Mobility cars are available at many railway stations.
- There are also car and truck transportation services (German: Autoverlad) on some lines, mainly in mountainous areas.
- Some trains feature an area (indicated either near or on the doors), or even an entire railroad car (e.g. trains on the Altstätten–Gais railway line), for transportation of bicycles. Most railway stations have a bicycle parking and/or bicycle parking station. Some railway stations also offer bicycle washing and repair services.

== Costs and subsidies ==
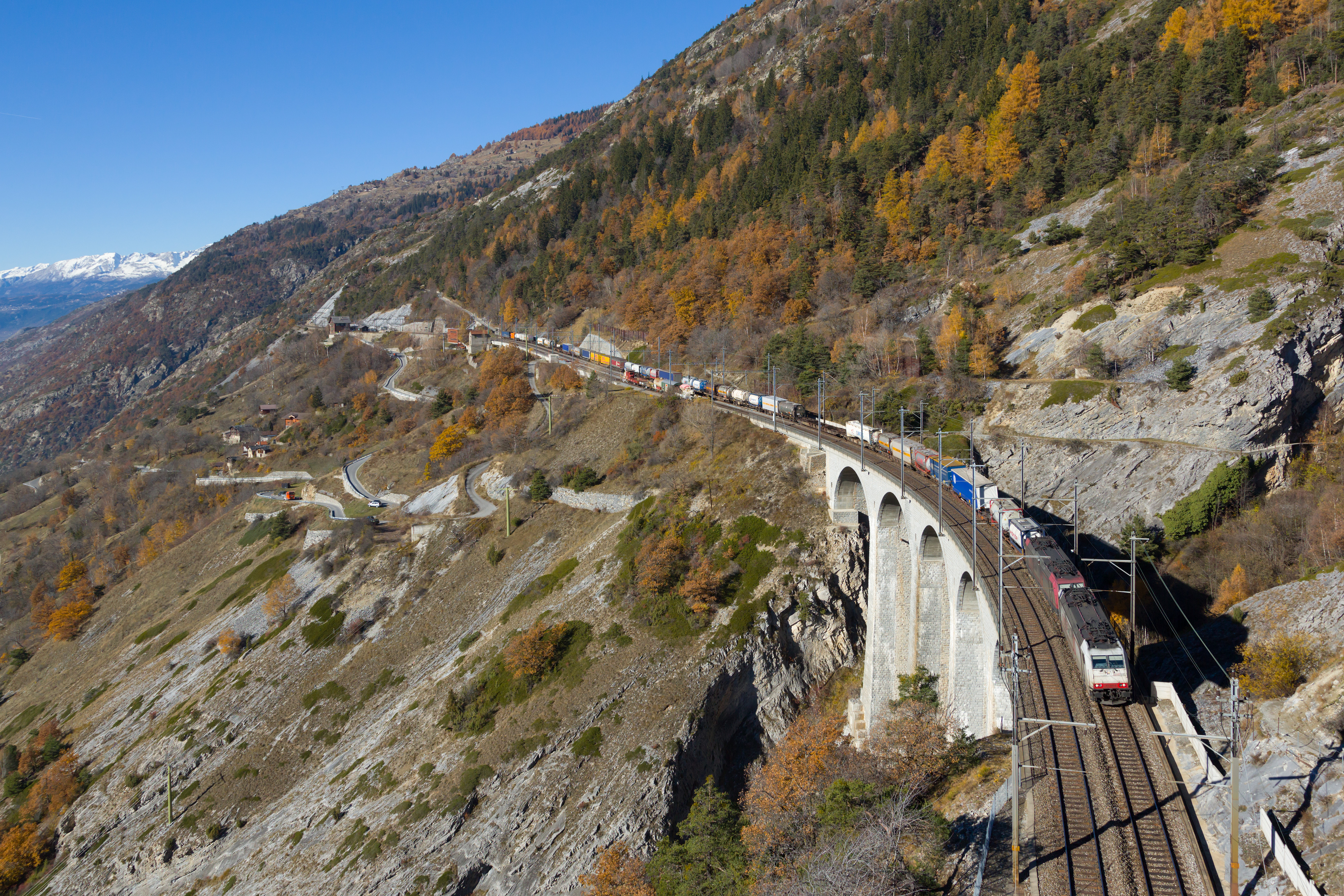
A goods train on the Lötschberg summit line. About CHF 18 billion have been spent on modernizing the Gotthard and Lötschberg axis, both part of the NRLA project

Although public investment is positively correlated with a given railway system's performance, the European Railway Performance Index finds differences in the value that countries receive in return for their public cost. The 2017 Index found Switzerland captures high value for money relative to the average ratio of performance to cost among European countries.

=== Passenger transport ===
In 2012, the total costs for passenger transport on Swiss railway network was CHF 8.88 billion, of which CHF 4.46 billion (50%) were due to infrastructure costs, CHF 3.98 billion (45%) were costs of transportation means, CHF 427 million due to environmental and health costs, and CHF 25 million due to accidents.

CHF 4.28 billion, or 48.2%, were paid by passengers, and CHF 4.15 billion (or 47%) came from rail subsidies provided by federal, cantonal, and municipal contributions. CHF 426 million (or 4.8%) were contributed by the common weal (accident and health insurances, environmental funds etc.).

=== Freight transport ===
In 2012, the total costs for freight transport on Swiss railway network was CHF 2.063 billion, of which CHF 779 million (37.8%) were due to infrastructure costs, CHF 900 million (43.6%) were costs of transportation means, CHF 59 million due to environmental and health costs, and CHF 325 million (15.8%) due to accidents.

CHF 1.058 billion, or 51.3%, were paid by customers, and CHF 122 million (5.9%) by transporting companies, while CHF 555 million (26.9%) were subsidised by federal, cantonal, and municipal contributions. CHF 328 millions (15.9%) were contributed by the common weal (accident and health insurances, environmental funds etc.).

== History ==
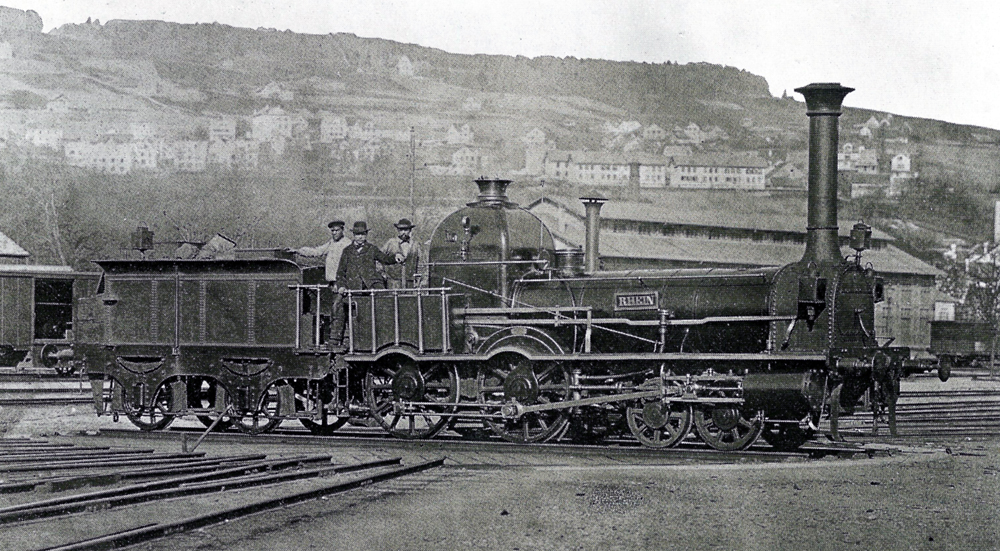
Locomotive used by the Swiss Northern Railway (1868 photograph)

The construction and operation of Swiss railways during the 19th century was carried out by private railways. The first internal line (known as the Spanisch Brötli Bahn) was a 16 km (9.9 mi) line opened from Zürich to Baden in 1847, operated by the Swiss Northern Railway. By 1860 railways connected western and northeastern Switzerland but the Alps remained an insurmountable barrier for railways, which need low gradients. The first trans-alpine railway and north–south axis in Switzerland finally opened in 1882. It was the Gotthard Railway, with at its heart the Gotthard Tunnel, passing well below the Gotthard Pass. A second line was opened even lower under the Simplon Pass in 1906 (the Simplon Railway), and a third under the Lötschberg in 1913 (the Lötschberg Railway).

In 1901 the major railways were nationalised to form Swiss Federal Railways. During the first half of the 20th century they were electrified and slowly upgraded. After the Second World War rail rapidly lost its share of the rail market to road transport as car ownership rose and more roads were built. From 1970 the Federal Government has become more involved in upgrading the railways, especially in urban areas and on trunk routes under the Rail 2000 project. In addition, two major trans-alpine routes—the Gotthard Railway and the Lötschberg approach to the Simplon—were rebuilt under the NRLA project. As a consequence, two new flat routes through the Alps opened in the early 21st century: The Lötschberg Base Tunnel in 2007 and the Gotthard Base Tunnel in 2016.

Between 1869 and 1976, goods wagons were carried from Romanshorn station across Lake Constance using train ferries.

== See also ==
- List of aerial tramways in Switzerland
- List of busiest railway stations in Switzerland
- List of highest railway stations in Switzerland
- List of mountain railways in Switzerland
- List of named passenger trains of Switzerland
- List of railway companies in Switzerland
- List of railway museums in Switzerland
- List of railway stations in Switzerland by canton
- Swiss railway clock
- Transportation in Switzerland

== Notes and references ==
=== Bibliography ===
- Organ, John (2003). Swiss Narrow Gauge: featuring steam in the Alps. Narrow Gauge Branch Lines series. Midhurst, West Sussex, UK: Middleton Press. ISBN 190170694X.
- Organ, John (2012). Northern Alpine Narrow Gauge: Interlaken to Puchberg. Narrow Gauge Branch Lines series. Midhurst, West Sussex, UK: Middleton Press. ISBN 9781908174376.
- Organ, John (2012). Southern Alpine Narrow Gauge: Montreux to Tirano. Narrow Gauge Branch Lines series. Midhurst, West Sussex, UK: Middleton Press. ISBN 9781908174222.
