= Chaux =

Chaux may refer to:

== Places ==
in France

- Chaux, Côte-d'Or, a commune in the department of Côte-d'Or
- Chaux, Territoire de Belfort, commune in the department of Territoire de Belfort
- The Forest of Chaux, Franche-Comté, the second largest forest in France
- Chaux, an ideal city near the Forest of Chaux proposed by Claude-Nicolas Ledoux (1736-1806)
- Chaux-Champagny, commune in the department of Jura
- Chaux-des-Crotenay, commune in the department of Jura
- Chaux-des-Prés, commune in the department of Jura
- Chaux-la-Lotière, commune in the department of Haute-Saône
- Chaux-lès-Clerval, commune in the department of Doubs
- Chaux-lès-Passavant, commune in the department of Doubs
- Chaux-lès-Port, commune in the department of Haute-Saône
- Chaux-Neuve, commune in the department of Doubs

in Switzerland

- Chaux (Cossonay)
- Chaux des Breuleux
- Chaux du Milieu
- Chaux Ronde, a mountain in the western Bernese Alps, overlooking Villars-sur-Ollon in the canton of Vaud

== People ==
- Víctor Mosquera Chaux (1919–1997), Colombian lawyer and politician who, as Presidential Designate, served as interim President of Colombia for 8 days in February, 1981

== See also ==
- La Chaux (disambiguation)
