= Chamossaire =

Chamossaire may refer to:

- Le Chamossaire, a mountain in the Swiss Alps
- Chamossaire (horse), a British Thoroughbred racehorse
