= Santoche =

- Part of Pays-de-Clerval
- Location of Santoche
- Location within France Location within Bourgogne-Franche-Comté
- Coordinates: 47°24′17″N 6°30′29″E
- Country: France
- Region: Bourgogne-Franche-Comté
- Department: Doubs
- Arrondissement: Montbéliard
- Canton: Bavans
- Commune: Pays-de-Clerval
- Area^{1}: 2.15 km^{2} (0.83 sq mi)
- Highest elevation: 385 m (1,263 ft)
- Lowest elevation: 275 m (902 ft)
- Population (2014): 87
  - Density: 40/km^{2} (100/sq mi)
- Time zone: UTC+01:00 (CET)
  - Summer (DST): UTC+02:00 (CEST)
- Postal code: 25340
- ^{1} French Land Register data, which excludes lakes, ponds, glaciers > 1 km^{2} (0.386 sq mi or 247 acres) and river estuaries.

Santoche (French pronunciation: [sɑ̃tɔʃ]) is a former commune in the Doubs department in the Bourgogne-Franche-Comté region in eastern France. On 1 January 2017, it was merged into the new commune Pays-de-Clerval.

== Geography ==
Santoche lies 2 km (1.2 mi) north of Clerval in the valley of the Doubs on an ancient Roman road.

== History ==
The commune has the only dolmen in the department and a rectangular mound surrounded by ditches called the Motte Jules César, which was once a Gallic temple.

Archaeological digs have discovered prehistoric objects and bones.

== See also ==
- Communes of the Doubs department
