= La Chaux =

La Chaux is the name or part of the name of several places:

in France

- La Chaux, Doubs, a commune
- La Chaux, Orne, a commune
- La Chaux, Saône-et-Loire, a commune
- La Chaux-du-Dombief, a commune in the Jura département
- La Chaux-en-Bresse, a commune in the Jura département

in Switzerland

- La Chaux (Cossonay), a commune in the canton of Vaud
- La Chaux (Sainte-Croix), a town in the commune of Sainte-Croix (Vaud)
- La Chaux-de-Fonds, a commune in the canton of Neuchâtel
- La Chaux-des-Breuleux, a commune in the canton of Jura
- La Chaux-du Milieu, a commune in the canton of Neuchâtel
- La Chaux (Verbier), an area of the Verbier skiing area

== See also ==
- Chaux (disambiguation)
