= Pays-de-Clerval =

- Commune
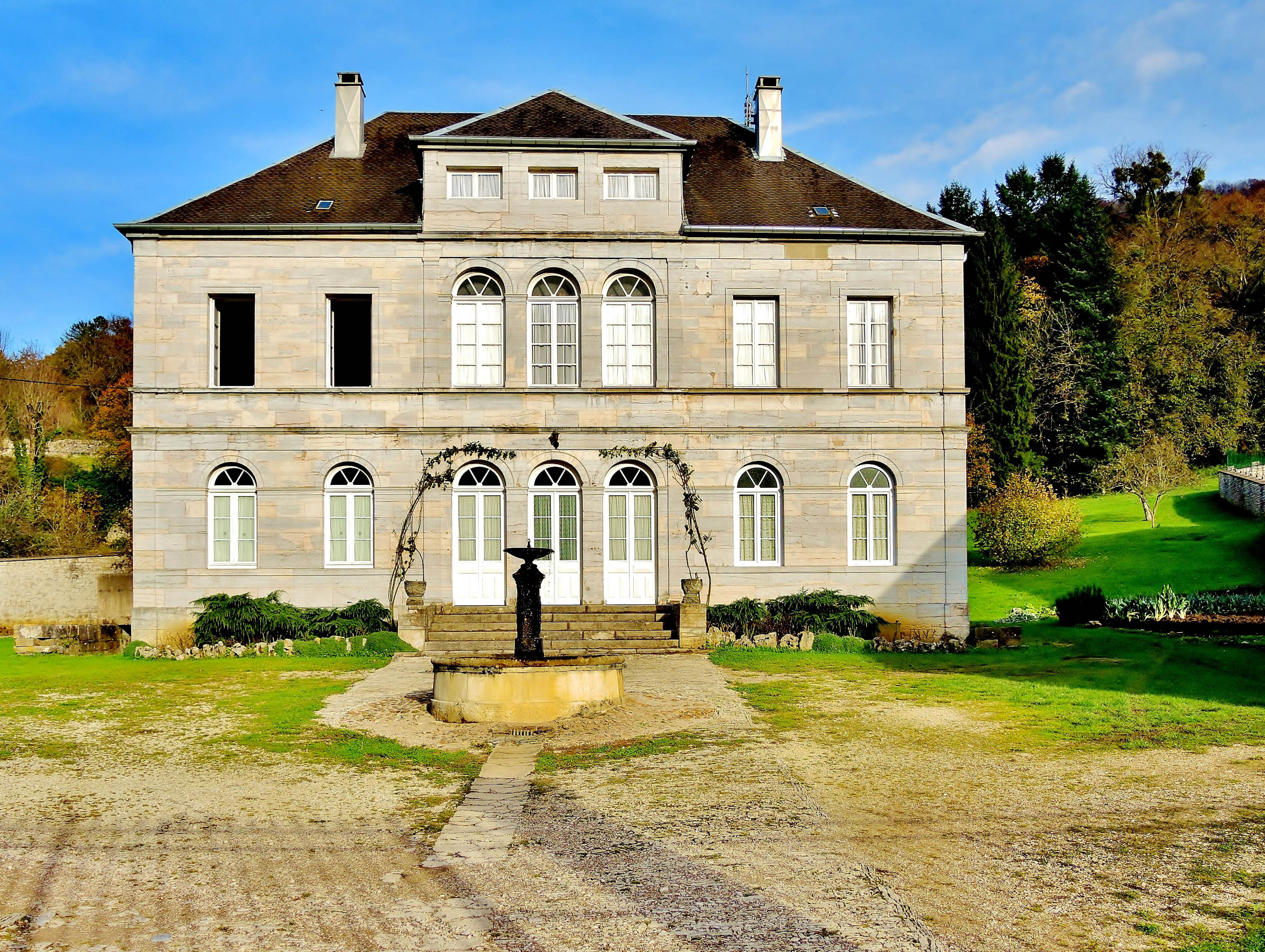
- The chateau of General Blondeau in Clerval
- Location of Pays-de-Clerval
- Location within France Location within Bourgogne-Franche-Comté
- Coordinates: 47°23′35″N 6°29′53″E
- Country: France
- Region: Bourgogne-Franche-Comté
- Department: Doubs
- Arrondissement: Montbéliard
- Canton: Bavans
- Intercommunality: Deux Vallées Vertes

Government
  - Mayor (2020–2026): Georges Garnier
- Area^{1}: 22.55 km^{2} (8.71 sq mi)
- Population (2023): 1,174
  - Density: 52.06/km^{2} (134.8/sq mi)
- Time zone: UTC+01:00 (CET)
  - Summer (DST): UTC+02:00 (CEST)
- INSEE/Postal code: 25156 /25340
- ^{1} French Land Register data, which excludes lakes, ponds, glaciers > 1 km^{2} (0.386 sq mi or 247 acres) and river estuaries.

Pays-de-Clerval (French pronunciation: [pei də klɛʁval], literally Land of Clerval) is a commune in the department of Doubs, eastern France. The municipality was established on 1 January 2017 by merger of the former communes of Clerval (the seat) and Santoche. On 1 January 2019, the former commune Chaux-lès-Clerval was merged into Pays-de-Clerval.

== See also ==
- Communes of the Doubs department
