= Chaux-lès-Clerval =

- Part of Pays-de-Clerval
- Location of Chaux-lès-Clerval
- Location within France Location within Bourgogne-Franche-Comté
- Coordinates: 47°23′01″N 6°30′30″E
- Country: France
- Region: Bourgogne-Franche-Comté
- Department: Doubs
- Arrondissement: Montbéliard
- Canton: Bavans
- Commune: Pays-de-Clerval
- Area^{1}: 8.57 km^{2} (3.31 sq mi)
- Highest elevation: 650 m (2,130 ft)
- Lowest elevation: 272 m (892 ft)
- Population (2023): 157
  - Density: 18.3/km^{2} (47.4/sq mi)
- Time zone: UTC+01:00 (CET)
  - Summer (DST): UTC+02:00 (CEST)
- Postal code: 25340
- ^{1} French Land Register data, which excludes lakes, ponds, glaciers > 1 km^{2} (0.386 sq mi or 247 acres) and river estuaries.

Chaux-lès-Clerval (French pronunciation: [ʃo lɛ klɛʁval], literally Chaux near Clerval) is a former commune in the Doubs department in the Bourgogne-Franche-Comté region in eastern France. On 1 January 2019, it was merged into the commune Pays-de-Clerval.

== See also ==
- Clerval
- Communes of the Doubs department
