= Villars-sur-Ollon =

- Municipality
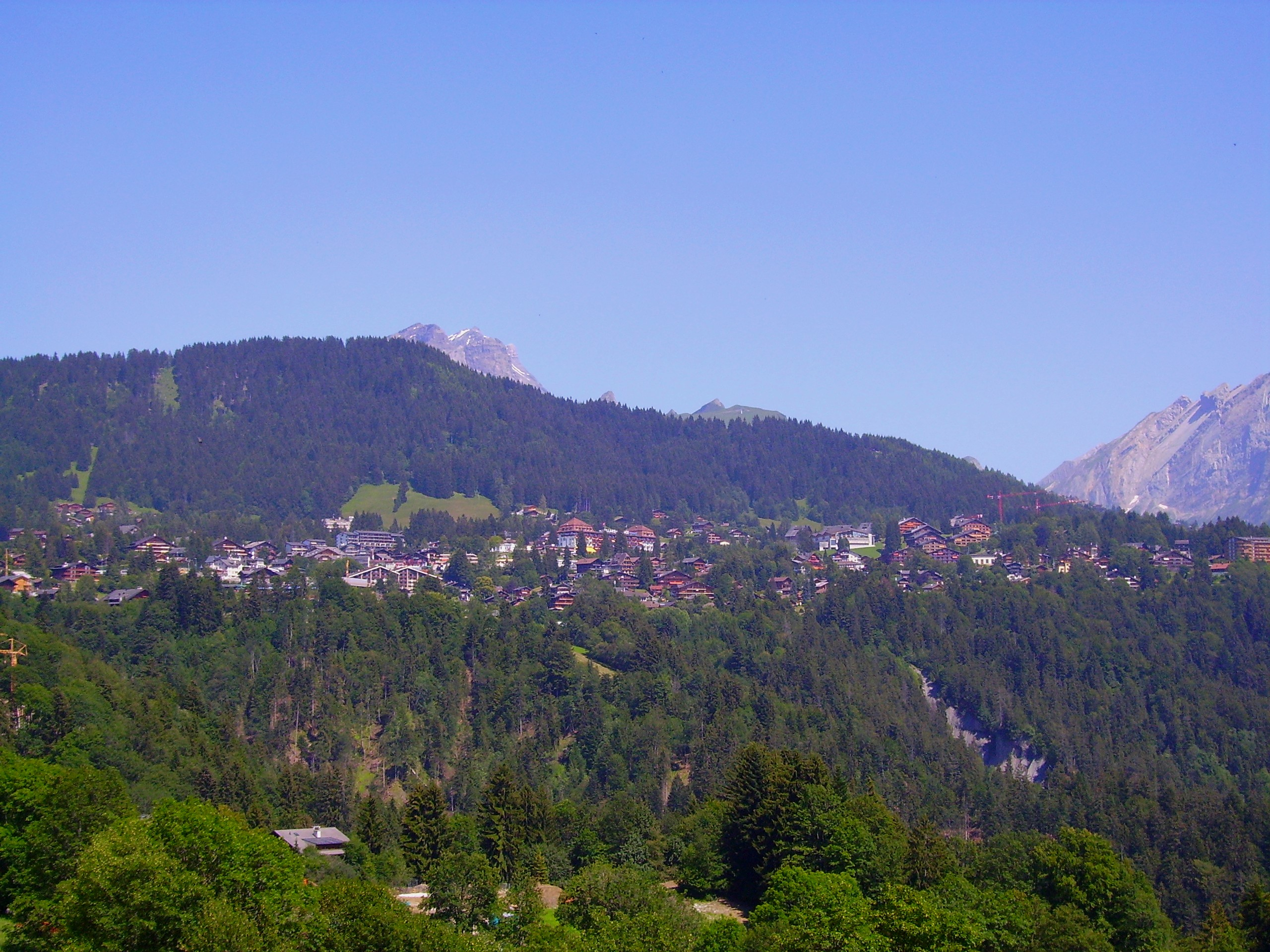
- Panorama of Villars-sur-Ollon

- Flag Coat of arms
- Location of Villars-sur-Ollon
- Location within Switzerland Location within Canton of Vaud
- Coordinates: 46°17′44″N 7°03′20″E
- Country: Switzerland
- Canton: Vaud
- District: Aigle
- Elevation: 1,258 m (4,127 ft)
- Time zone: UTC+01:00 (CET)
  - Summer (DST): UTC+02:00 (CEST)
- Postal code: 1884
- ISO 3166 code: CH-VD
- Surrounded by: Gryon, Ormont-Dessus, Ollon, Aigle
- Website: www.ollon.ch

Villars-sur-Ollon, commonly referred to as Villars, is an upscale village and ski resort in Switzerland in the canton of Vaud, part of the municipality of Ollon.

== Description ==
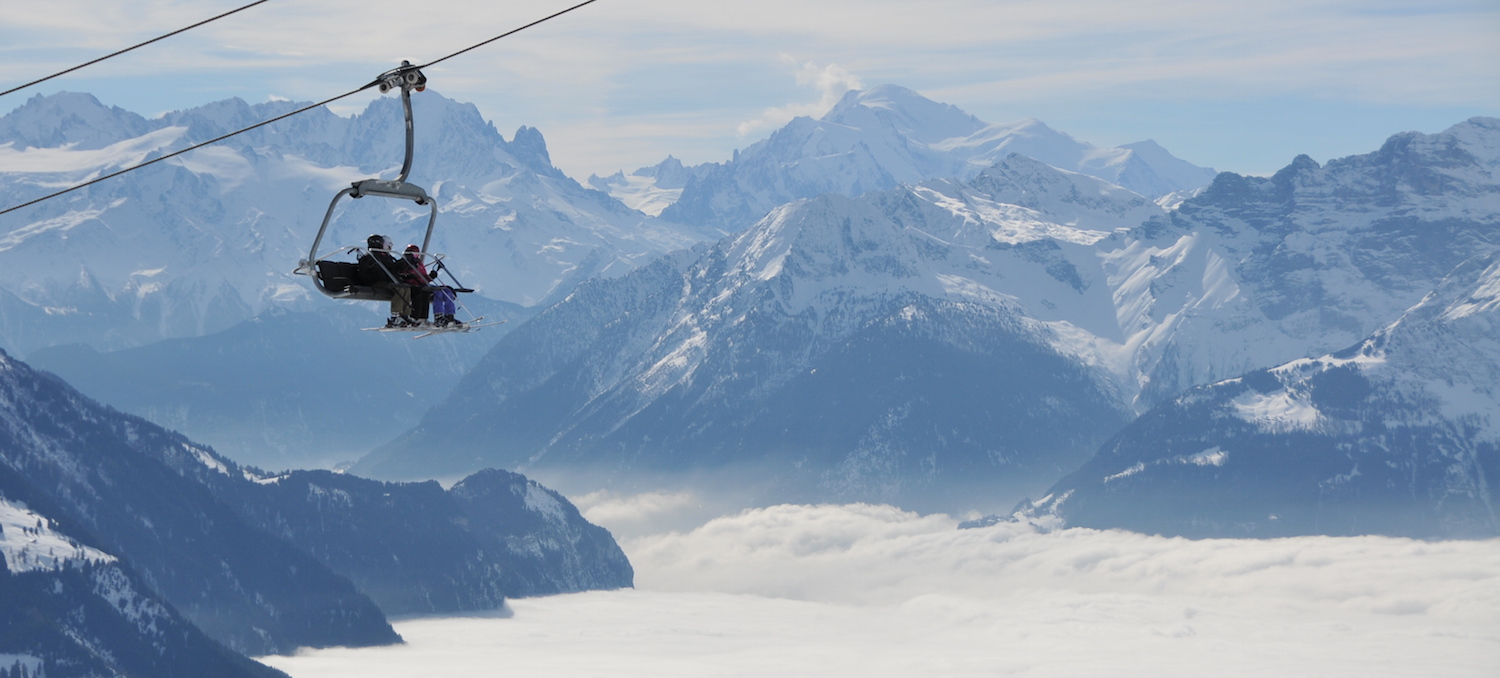
Ski Lift to the slopes above Villars with Mont Blanc in the background

Telecabine Roc d'Orsay

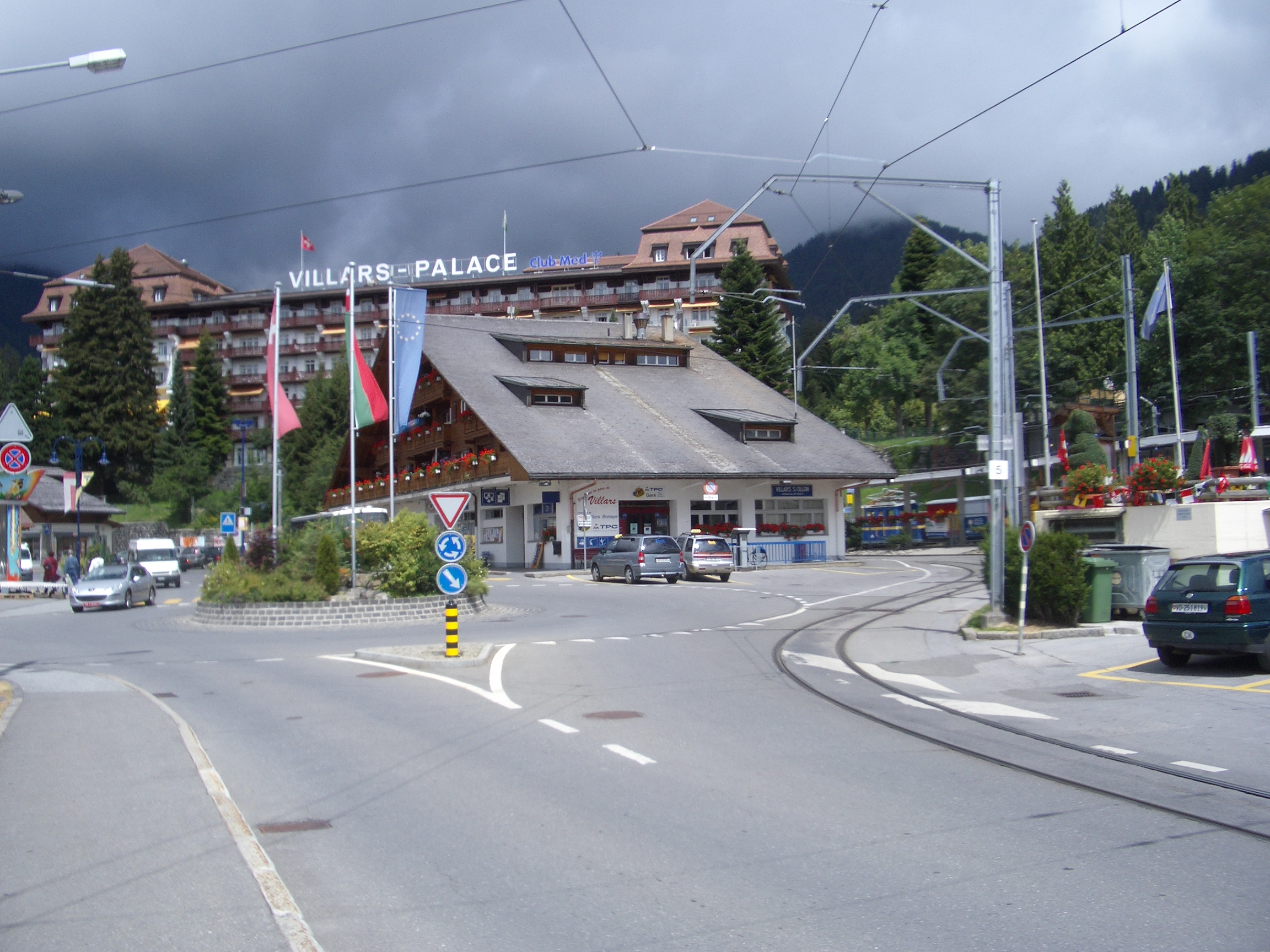
Villars Railway Station

=== Geography and skiing network ===
Aerial view (1949)

Villars overlooks the Rhône valley from an altitude of 1,258 metres (4,130 ft). The peak of Mont Blanc is clearly visible from parts of the village and from the village's more elevated ski area Bretaye (1,806 metres (5,930 ft)). That area is the center of the skiing network. It is accessible by the BVB railway (Chemin de fer Bex-Villars-Bretaye), featuring a cogwheel train, and by a gondola lift to the 'Roc d'Orsay' (1,952 metres (6,400 ft)). There are around 112 kilometres (70 miles) of skiing slopes in the skiing network of Villars with Gryon, Les Diablerets, and Glacier 3000.

The slopes on Glacier 3000 offer year round skiing. Furthermore, the ticketing system of Villars is part of the Magic Pass skiing area that covers 30 resorts in the larger area.

=== History and culture ===
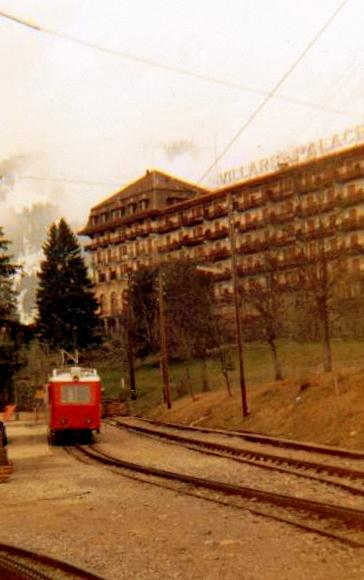
The funicular railway at Villars in 1965

During the 12th and 13th centuries, a notable demographic upsurge motivated the monks from the Abbey of Saint-Maurice to assist the local peasants in conquering and clearing mountain pastures. Tourism in Villars started in 1856 when the first summer only hotel 'Chalet de Villars' was opened by a colonel who had owned a chalet since 1830.

In 1901 the railway reached Villars. In 1913 it was continued by a mountain cog-train to Bretaye where the development stopped because of the war. In 1936, the first ski lift was built at the ‘Combe’ on the Chaux Ronde. This was a first in Switzerland, and skiers had to fasten themselves on with a large leather belt in order to go back up the mountain. In 1938, Villars was classified as one of the prime skiing resorts of Europe.

On 13 December 1936, the Orient Express made a special stop in Aigle for a slalom race that took place at Bretaye. That same year a ski lift was built in the form of a sledge. This lift could transport 12 skiers to the peak of the Grand Chamossaire and was in use until 1953.

During the fifties and early sixties, the Ollon-Villars Hillclimb was a round in the European Hill Climb championship and attracted racing drivers from all over the world. They would race 8 kilometres (5.0 miles) of mountain road from Ollon up to Villars. In recent years a revival of the hillclimb has begun to attract race car collectors and racing enthusiasts.

=== Public schools and private boarding schools ===
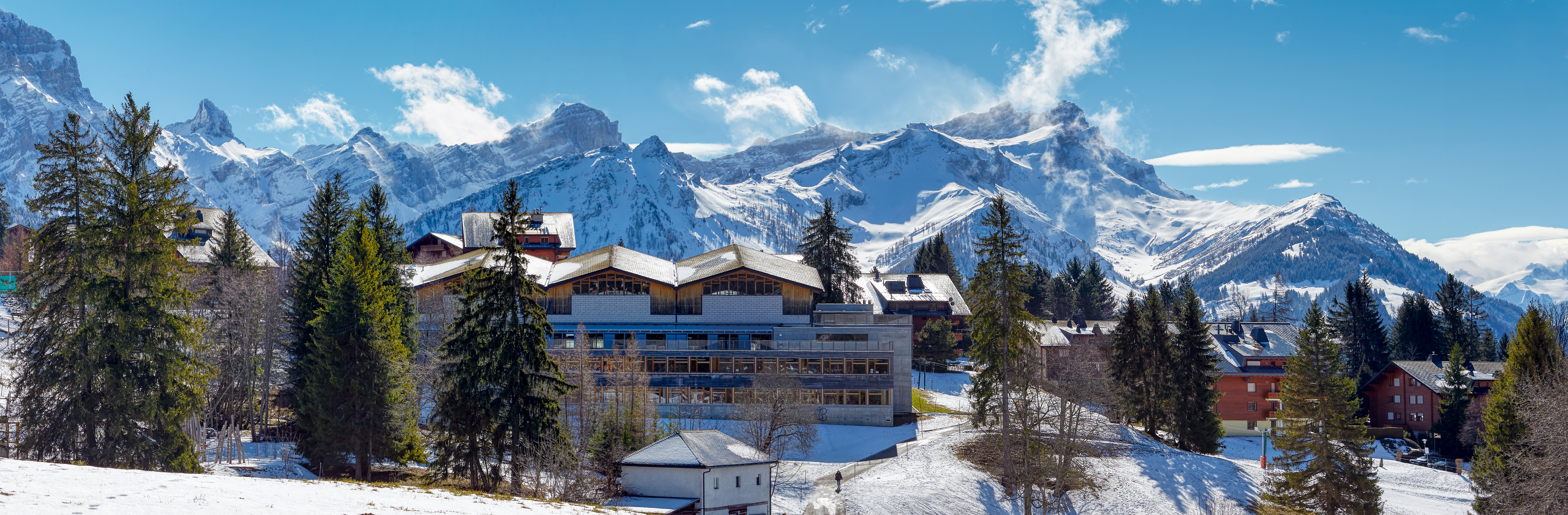
Panoramic view of public primary school with sports center and skiing/sledging slopes

Villars is known to host some of the most expensive private international boarding schools in the world, the industry having started in the early post-WWII years, such as Collège Alpin International Beau Soleil and Aiglon College.

The village also features a public primary school (Collège d'En-Haut) that is built into the Villars Sports Center right next to a skiing and sledging slope. Older children go to the second primary school (Collège d'En-Bas) to the central school in Ollon.

=== Villars Institute Foundation ===
Villars is also known to host the Villars Institute, a nonprofit foundation dedicated to accelerate the transition to a net zero and nature positive economy.

== Activities ==
=== Skiing ===
As part of the larger Villars-Gryon-Diablerets ski region, the town is a popular wintertime destination. Two ski schools are located in the town.

=== Summer activities ===
The greater Villars area features more than 300 kilometres (190 miles) of marked hiking trails and 130 kilometres (81 miles) for mountain biking.

The Villars Golf Club, established in 1922, has a clubhouse and an 18-hole course set at 1,600 metres (5,200 ft) and perched on a south-facing plateau with views of Mont Blanc.

The Villars Sports Centre has 5 outdoor tennis courts and three indoor with an indoor sports hall for volleyball, badminton, and football. The facility also houses indoor and outdoor swimming pools, a wellness and spa area, a bowling and billiard lounge, a pumptrack skatepark, and an all season ice skating arena.

There are spas and wellness centres in and around Villars, including Lavey-les-Bains, the hottest thermal water baths in Switzerland.

=== Local attractions and sightseeing ===
For excursions, the attractive lakeside towns of Montreux, Évian, and Vevey are all close by and boat trips around Lac Leman are easily available. The imposing Aigle Castle built in the 12th century now houses the local Wine Museum. Chillon Castle, built in the 13th century on the banks of Lake Geneva, used to serve as a residence for the noble counts during the Middle Ages. The Gruyère-Pays d'Enhaut National park is also nearby.

== Notable people ==
- Olivia Ausoni (1923, Villars – 2010, Chesières), alpine ski racer.
- Béatrix Beck (1914, Villars – 2008), French writer of Belgian origin and the daughter of the poet Christian Beck.
- Octav Botnar (1913–1998), noted philanthropist, lived in Villars.
- Charlotte Chable (b. 1994, Villars), alpine ski racer.
- Jean-Daniel Dätwyler (b. 1945, Villars), former alpine skier and Olympic medalist.
- Princess Marie of Denmark (born 1976), daughter-in-law of Queen Margrethe II of Denmark.
- Fernand Grosjean (1924–2015), alpine ski racer.
- Ferdinand Hodler (1853–1918), one of the best known Swiss painters of the 19th century.
- Fanny Smith (b. 1992, Aigle), freestyle skier, world champion, and Olympic medalist.
- Georg Solti (1912–1997), orchestral and operatic conductor.
