= Le Chamossaire =

Mountain in Switzerland

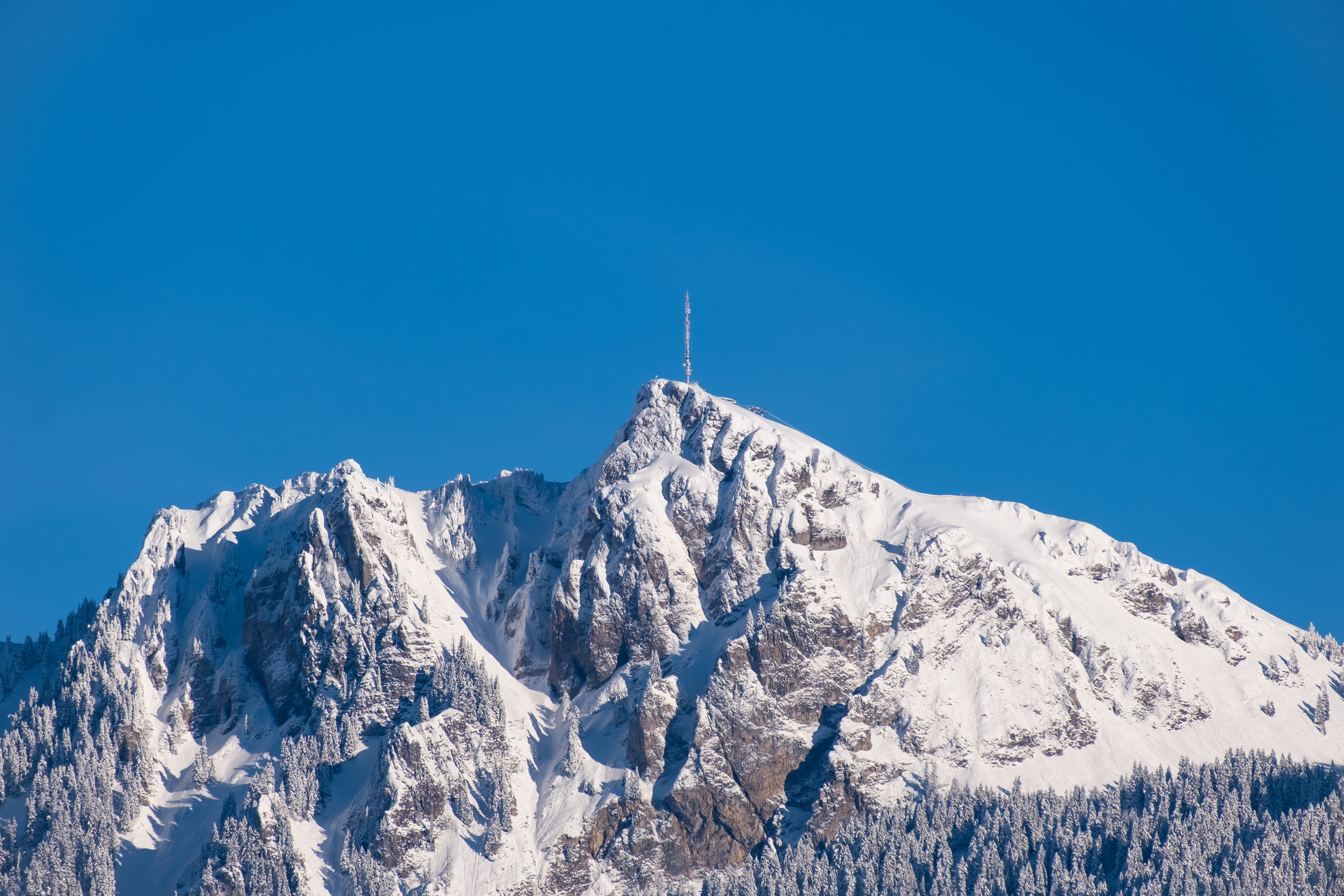
- Le Chamossaire from the Rhone valley

Highest point
- Elevation: 2,113 m (6,932 ft)
- Prominence: 380 m (1,250 ft)
- Coordinates: 46°19′36″N 7°3′40.7″E

Geography
- Location within Switzerland
- Location: Vaud, Switzerland
- Parent range: Bernese Alps

Le Chamossaire (French pronunciation: [lə ʃamɔsɛʁ]) is a mountain part of the Alpes Vaudoises, overlooking Villars-sur-Ollon on its south face and Les Ormonts valley on its north face. It is located in the canton of Vaud. The mountain is part of Villars ski area and its summit is easily accessible from Bretaye with the Bex–Villars–Bretaye railway and then a fast chairlift. Located more east is the Petit Chamossaire shoulder accessible via a brand new chairlift.

== See also ==
- List of mountains of Switzerland accessible by public transport
