= Bretaye =

Mountain pass in the Swiss Alps

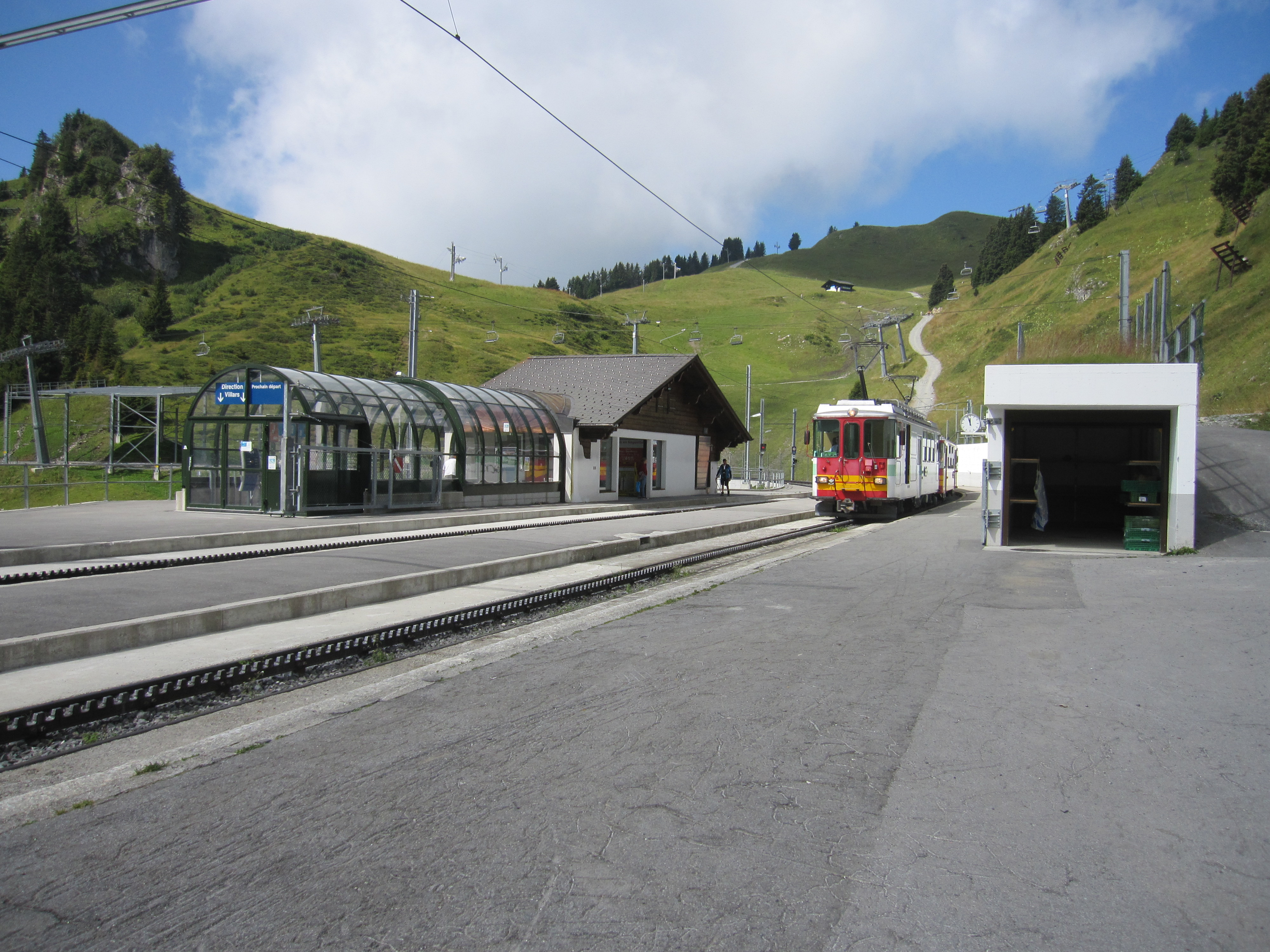
- Arrival of a Bex-Villars-Bretaye train at the summit

- Location within Switzerland
- Elevation: 1,806 metres (5,925 ft)
- Traversed by: Trail (dead end railway)

Third Approach
- Location: Vaud, Switzerland
- Range: Alps
- Coordinates: 46°19′19″N 07°04′25″E

Bretaye (or Col de Bretaye) is a high mountain pass of the Swiss Alps, located above Villars-sur-Ollon in the canton of Vaud. The pass (1,806 m) is connected to Villars by the Bex–Villars–Bretaye railway, which is the second highest railway of the canton after the Montreux–Glion–Rochers-de-Naye railway line. In winter, Bretaye is the main ski area of Villars and a chairlift leads to the summit of Le Chamossaire (2,112 m).
