= Clerval, Doubs =

Clerval
- Part of Pays-de-Clerval
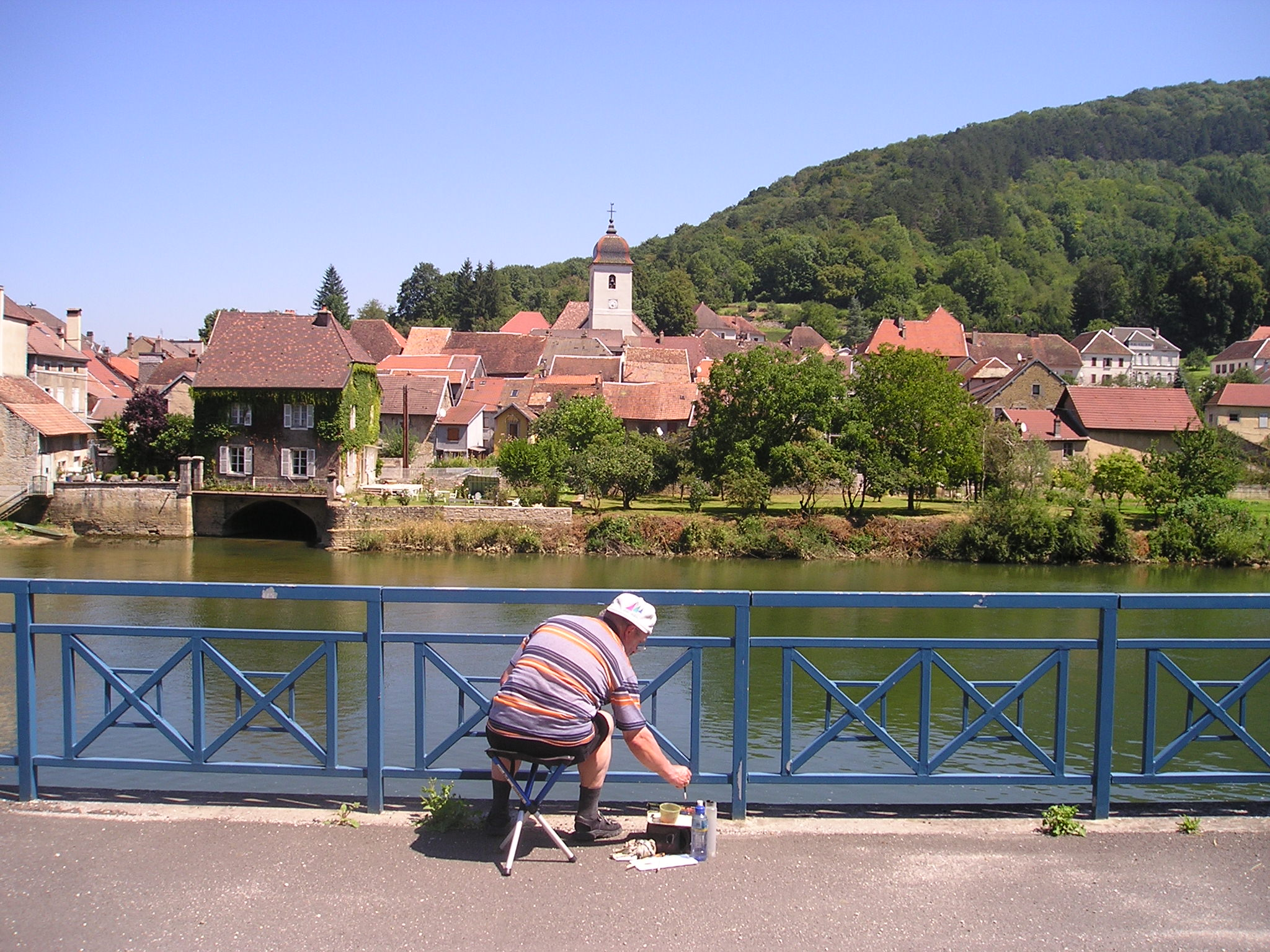

- Coat of arms
- Location of Clerval
- Location within France Location within Bourgogne-Franche-Comté
- Coordinates: 47°23′35″N 6°29′54″E
- Country: France
- Region: Bourgogne-Franche-Comté
- Department: Doubs
- Arrondissement: Montbéliard
- Canton: Bavans
- Commune: Pays-de-Clerval
- Area^{1}: 11.83 km^{2} (4.57 sq mi)
- Highest elevation: 550 m (1,800 ft)
- Lowest elevation: 274 m (899 ft)
- Population (2014): 1,017
  - Density: 85.97/km^{2} (222.7/sq mi)
- Time zone: UTC+01:00 (CET)
  - Summer (DST): UTC+02:00 (CEST)
- Postal code: 25340
- ^{1} French Land Register data, which excludes lakes, ponds, glaciers > 1 km^{2} (0.386 sq mi or 247 acres) and river estuaries.

Clerval (French pronunciation: [klɛʁval]) is a former commune in the Doubs department in the Bourgogne-Franche-Comté region in eastern France. On 1 January 2017, it was merged into the new commune Pays-de-Clerval.

== Population ==
Historical population
| Year | Pop. | ±% p.a. |
|---|---|---|
| 1962 | 1,168 | — |
| 1968 | 1,021 | −2.22% |
| 1975 | 1,176 | +2.04% |
| 1982 | 1,008 | −2.18% |
| 1990 | 925 | −1.07% |
| 1999 | 1,066 | +1.59% |
| 2006 | 1,004 | −0.85% |
| 2014 | 1,017 | +0.16% |
Source: EHESS and INSEE

== See also ==
- Communes of the Doubs department
