= Bex–Villars–Bretaye railway =

Railway line in Switzerland

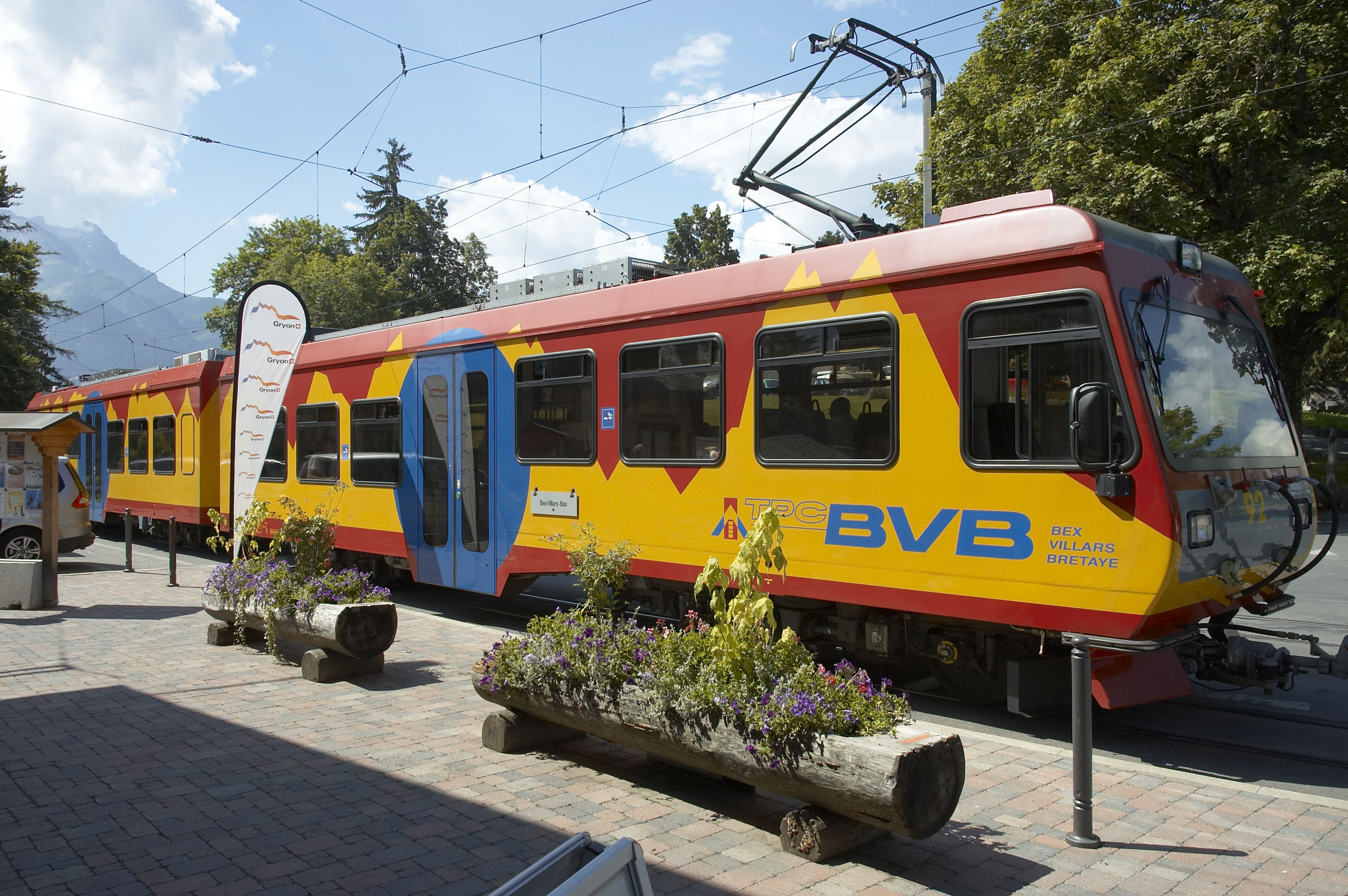
- 2001-built twinset 92 at Barboleusaz station

Overview
- Native name: Chemin de fer Bex–Villars–Bretaye
- Locale: Bex, Switzerland

History
- Opened: 10 September 1898

Technical
- Line length: 17.1 km (10.63 mi)
- Rack system: Abt
- Track gauge: 3 ft 3 3/8 in metre gauge
- Electrification: 700 V DC Overhead wire
- Highest elevation: 1,810 m (5,938 ft)

The Bex–Villars–Bretaye Railway (French: Chemin de fer Bex-Villars-Bretaye, BVB) is a metre gauge railway line operating between the towns of Bex and Villars-sur-Ollon and the Col de Bretaye mountain pass, situated in the Chablais region of southwest Switzerland. It is, in fact, two railways, one mixed adhesion and rack worked between Bex and Villars-sur-Ollon, the other, linking Villars to the Col de Bretaye being worked on the Abt rack system. Passengers making the full journey are required to change trains at Villars.

== History ==
The authority to construct the railway was gained in three stages, that from Bex, a small town on the main Lausanne–Simplon railway, to Villars-sur-Ollon on 15 October 1897; from Villars to Chesières on 19 December 1905 and from Villars to Bretaye on 5 October 1911. The lines were opened in five stages. A tramway was opened from Bex to Bévieux on 10 September 1898, continuing to Gryon from 3 June 1900 as a rack railway and reaching Villars, again as tramway, just over one year later. The line from Villars to Chesières was opened on 12 August 1901, less than eight months after authorisation while the final link, that from Villars to Bretaye, opened on 18 December 1913 as a distinct company. The two companies BGVC and VB merged in 1943. However, the company was officially registered as "Forces motrices de l'Avançon" and this company still exists. Simply, the railway no longer belongs to this company. Since 1999 the line has been operated as part of the Transports Publics du Chablais and details from that date of investments are included under that heading.

== Line ==
The line, with a total length of 17.1 km (10.6 mi), rises from 427 m (1,401 ft) at Bex to 1,810 m (5,938 ft) at Bretaye. Of this length, 7.34 km (4.56 mi) is operated on the Abt rack system.

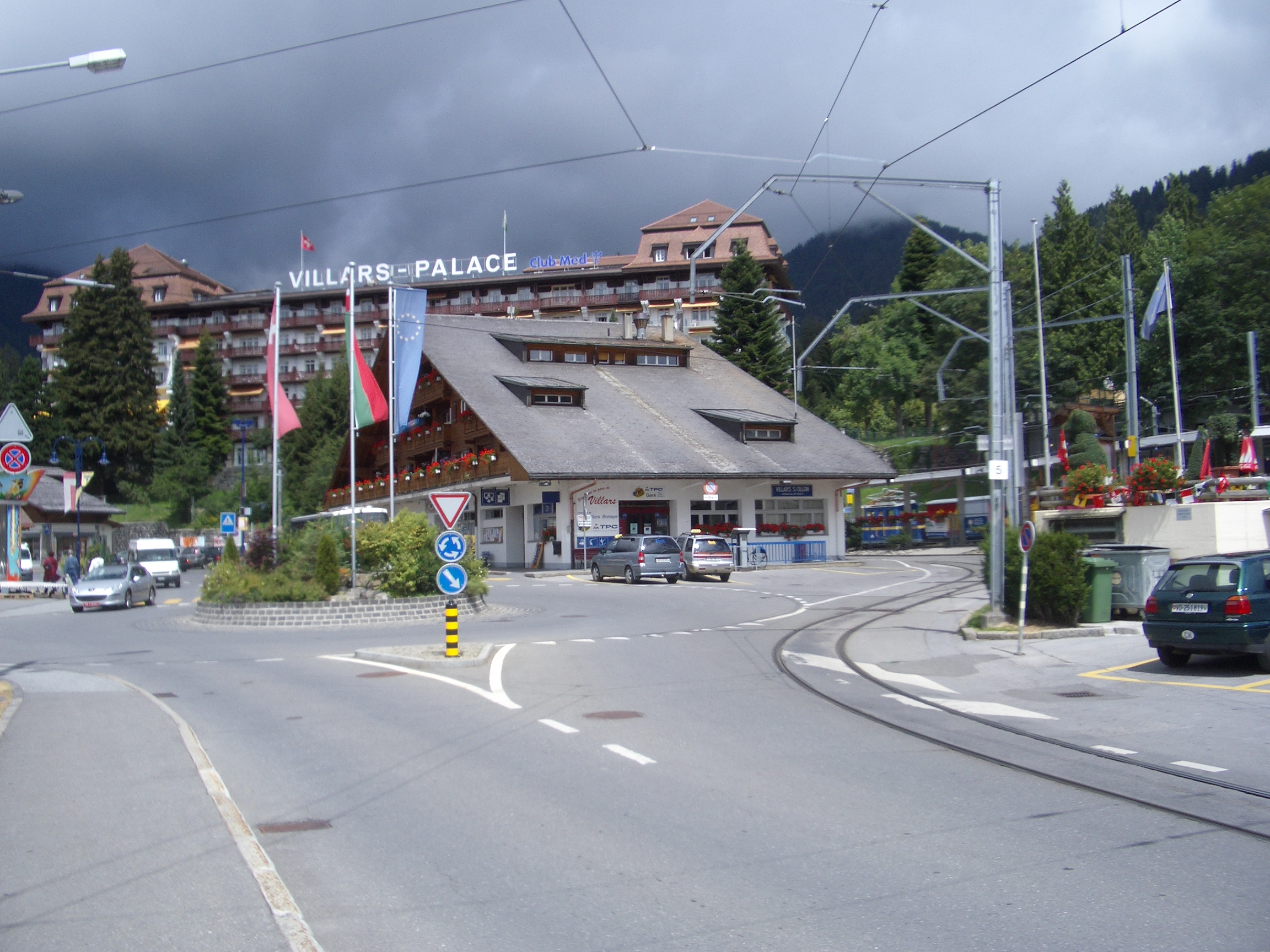
Villars Railway Station

The first part of the line, reflecting its tramway history, runs alongside and through the streets of Bex from its terminal in the square outside the main line station. For many years, the 3.4 km (2.1 mi) section between Bex station and Bévieux had a regular tram service in addition to the through service, albeit running only approximately hourly, using 1948-built three-axle trams 15 and 16. A bus service replaced the tram service in 2002, but in 2007 it was reported that a single round trip was still scheduled to take place each weekday, departing Bévieux at 7:01 and Bex at 7:15, using one of the 1948 trams. In 2013, this round trip was still being operated and was scheduled to depart Bévieux at 6:58 and return from Bex at 7:12, on weekdays only.

Electrical power is provided at 700 V DC through an overhead contact wire.

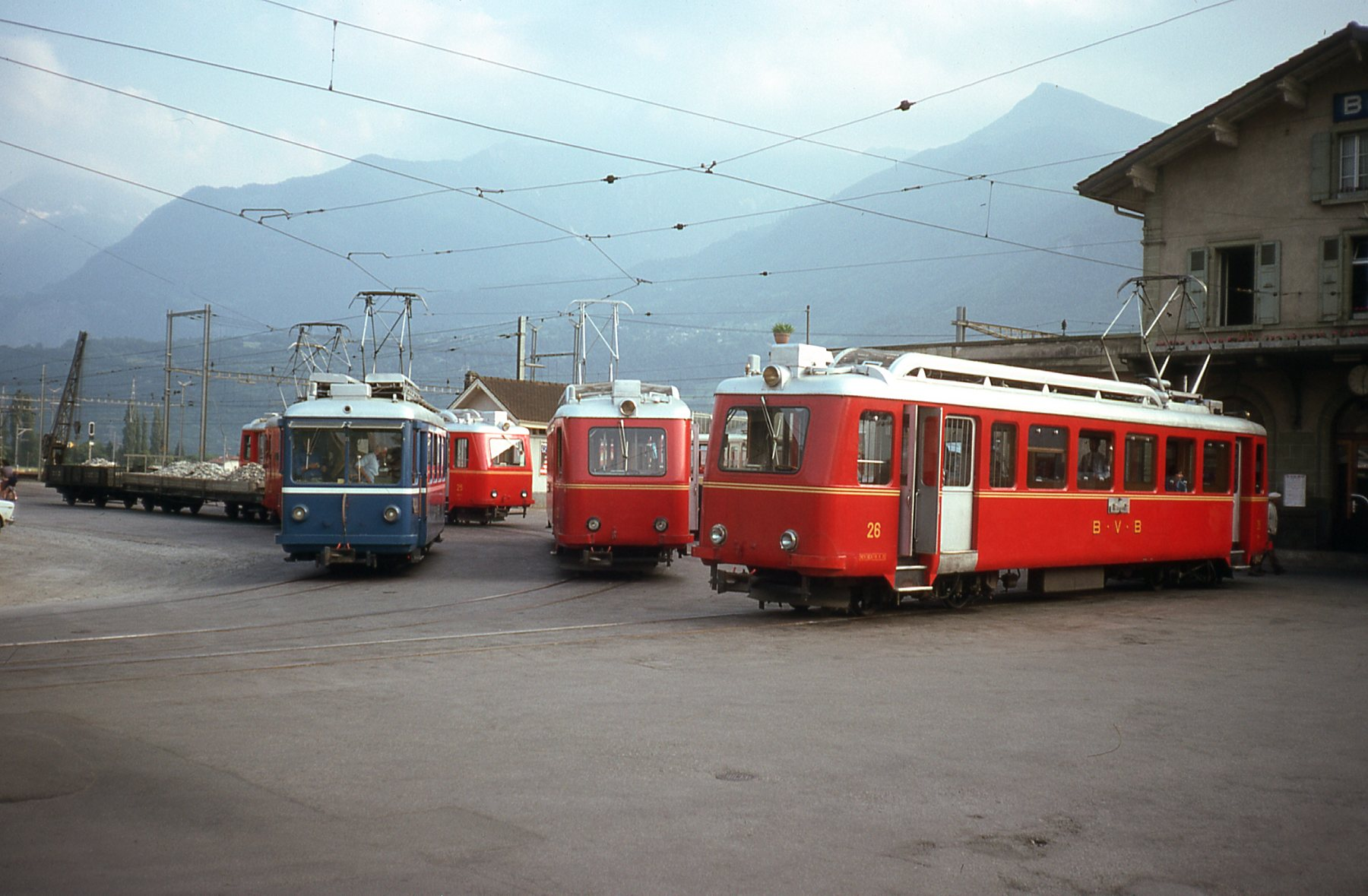
Three-axle tram (15 or 16), at left, and three of the 21–26 series cars in front of Bex SBB/CFF station

== Locomotives, railcars, and rolling stock ==
The passenger services on the line are operated by railcars (self-propelled railway vehicles; in French automotrice), either singly or with driving-trailer cars (voiture pilote) or the more recently built twin-unit railcars (automotrice-double) of class Beh4/8. A full list is given below based on the official stock list of the railway together with personal observation.

Most of the goods wagons used on the line date from 1900–1910.

No.	Name	Class	Builder(s)	Year completed	Notes
8		Be 2/2	SWS	1907	Self-propelled electric railcar; rebuilt 1953; out of service
9		Be 2/2	SWS	1915	Self-propelled electric railcar
15		Be 2/3	SWS/SLM	1948	Three-axle tramcar
16		Be 2/3	SWS/SLM	1948	Three-axle tramcar
22		BDeh 2/4	SLM	1940	Self-propelled electric railcar
23		BDeh 2/4	SLM	1940	Self-propelled electric railcar
24		BDeh 2/4	SLM	1941	Self-propelled electric railcar
25		BDeh 2/4	SLM	1944	Self-propelled electric railcar
26		BDeh 2/4	SLM	1945	Self-propelled electric railcar
31	Lavey	HGe 4/4	SIG/MFO	1953	Locomotive
32	Villars	HGe 4/4		1964	Locomotive
42		Te 2/2	SIG (rebuilt by BVB)	1898	Shunting locomotive
51		B		1953	Rebuilt 1996
52		Bs		1953	Rebuilt 1999
53		Bst		1964	Control trailer; rebuilt 1997
54		Bt		1964	Control trailer; rebuilt 1999
61		Bt		1976	Rebuilt 2000
62		B		1977	
63		Bt	Schindler/SAAS	1976	Control trailer
64		Bt	Schindler/SAAS	1977	Control trailer
65		Bt	SIG/ACMV (Vevey)/BBC	1987	Control trailer
81	Gryon	BDeh 4/4	ACMV (Vevey)/SLM/BBC	1976	Self-propelled electric railcar
82	Ollon	BDeh 4/4	ACMV (Vevey)/SLM/BBC	1977	Self-propelled electric railcar
83	Bex	BDeh 4/4	ACMV (Vevey)/SLM/BBC	1987	Self-propelled electric railcar
91	Bretaye	Beh 4/8	Bombardier Transportation (Vevey)/Stadler	2000	Self-propelled twin-unit electric railcar
92	Barboleuse	Beh 4/8	Bombardier Transportation (Vevey)/Stadler	2001	Self-propelled twin-unit electric railcar
93	Tuttlingen	Beh 4/8	Bombardier Transportation (Vevey)/Stadler	2001	Self-propelled twin-unit electric railcar

=== Abbreviations ===
- ACMV....Ateliers de constructions mécaniques de Vevey
- BBC.....Brown, Boveri & Cie
- BT......Bombardier Transportation
- SAAS....S. A. Ateliers de Secheron, Geneva
- SIG.....Societe Industrielle
- SLM.....Schweizerische Lokomotiv- und Maschinenfabrik, Winterthur

== See also ==
- List of mountain railways in Switzerland
