= Aigle railway station =

Railway station in Aigle, Switzerland

Aigle
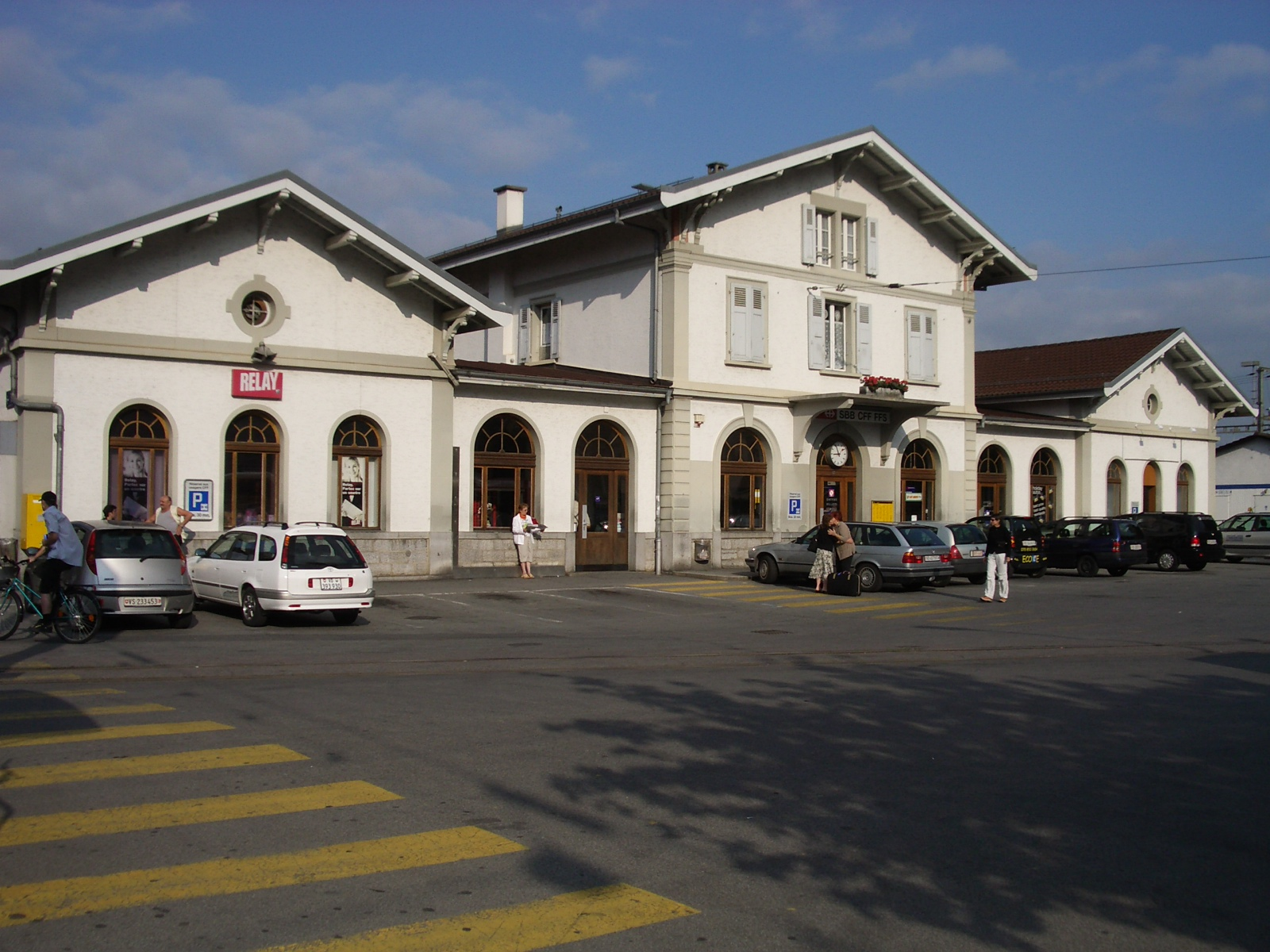
- The station building in 2006

General information
- Location: Aigle; Switzerland
- Coordinates: 46°19′01″N 6°57′49″E
- Elevation: 403 m (1,322 ft)
- Owner: Swiss Federal Railways
- Lines: Aigle–Leysin line; Aigle–Ollon–Monthey–Champéry line; Aigle–Sépey–Diablerets line; Simplon line
- Distance: 39.3 km (24.4 mi) from Lausanne
- Platforms: 9
- Tracks: 10
- Train operators: Swiss Federal Railways; Transports Publics du Chablais
- Connections: CarPostal SA buses; Transports Publics du Chablais buses

Construction
- Parking: Yes (345 spaces)
- Cycle facilities: Yes (81 spaces)
- Accessible: Yes

Other information
- Station code: 8501400 (AIG)
- Fare zone: 80 (mobilis)

Passengers
- 2025: 11'500 per day (SBB (excluding TPC))
- Rank: 70 out of 1,095

Services
Preceding station	SBB CFF FFS	Following station
Montreux towards Geneva Airport	IR 90	St-Maurice towards Brig
Montreux towards Geneva Airport	IR 95	Martigny towards Brig
Villeneuve VD towards Annemasse or Geneva Airport	RE33	Bex towards St-Maurice or Martigny
Villeneuve VD towards Lausanne	RegioExpress Limited service	Bex towards St-Maurice
Vevey towards Fribourg/Freiburg	VosAlpes Express	Bex towards Le Châble VS
Preceding station	RER Vaud	Following station
Roche VD towards Vallorbe	R3	Bex towards Vevey
Villeneuve VD towards Le Brassus or Vallorbe	R4	Bex towards Vevey
Preceding station	Transports Publics du Chablais	Following station
Terminus	R70	Aigle-Place-du-Marché towards Leysin-Grand-Hôtel
Terminus	R71	Aigle-Place-du-Marché towards Les Diablerets
Ollon VD towards Monthey-Ville or Champéry	R72	Terminus
Location

Aigle railway station (French: Gare d'Aigle) is a railway station in the municipality of Aigle, in the Swiss canton of Vaud. It is an intermediate stop on the standard gauge Simplon line of Swiss Federal Railways and the terminus of three 1,000 mm (3 ft 3 3/8 in) gauge lines operated by Transports Publics du Chablais: the Aigle–Leysin, Aigle–Ollon–Monthey–Champéry, and Aigle–Sépey–Diablerets lines.

== Services ==
As of the December 2024 timetable change, the following services stop at Aigle:

- InterRegio: half-hourly service between Geneva Airport and Brig.
- VosAlpes Express: daily direct service between Le Châble VS and Fribourg/Freiburg on weekends between December and April.
- RegioExpress:
  - half-hourly service (hourly on weekends) between Annemasse and St-Maurice, and hourly service from St-Maurice to Martigny. On weekends, hourly service to Geneva Airport.
  - two round-trips in each direction between Lausanne and St-Maurice.
- Regio:
  - half-hourly service to Monthey-Ville, with every other train continuing to Champéry.
  - hourly service to Les Diablerets.
  - hourly service to Leysin-Grand-Hôtel.
- RER Vaud R3 / R4: half-hourly (hourly on weekends) service between Vallorbe and Bex; hourly service to Le Brassus; limited service from Bex to St-Maurice.
