= Aigle–Leysin railway line =

Railway line in Switzerland

Aigle–Leysin

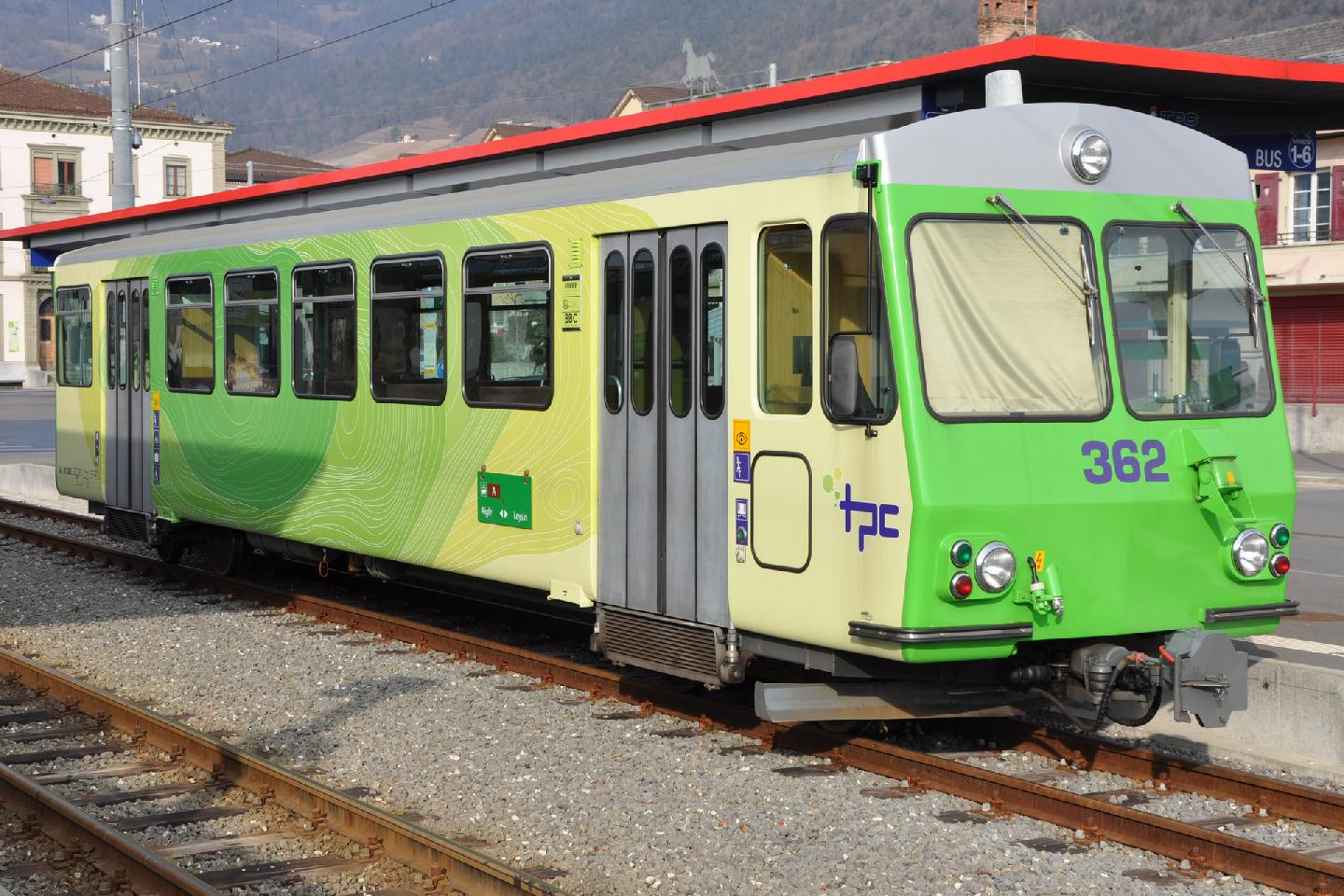
- Driving trailer No. 362 at Aigle in 2011

Overview
- Owner: Transports Publics du Chablais
- Termini: Aigle; Leysin, Switzerland

Service
- Operator(s): Transports Publics du Chablais
- Depot(s): Aigle

History
- Opened: 1900-1915

Technical
- Line length: 6.209 km (3.858 mi)
- Rack system: Abt
- Track gauge: 1,000 mm (3 ft 3 3/8 in)
- Electrification: 1500 V DC
- Highest elevation: 1,047 m (3,435 ft)
- Maximum incline: 23 %

The Aigle–Leysin railway line is a narrow-gauge railway line in the Chablais area of southwest Switzerland. The line was opened on 5 May 1900, a 1,000 mm (3 ft 3 3/8 in)-gauge cog-wheel railway using the Abt rack system. It was the first such line in the region. The line was built by the Chemin de fer Aigle–Leysin.

Nowadays it is joined in Aigle's main railway station by express trains of the Swiss Federal Railways together with those of three other, local, narrow-gauge railways: the Aigle-Ollon-Monthey-Champéry Railway (AOMC), the Aigle–Leysin Railway and the Aigle-Sépey-Diablerets Railway (ASD).

== History ==
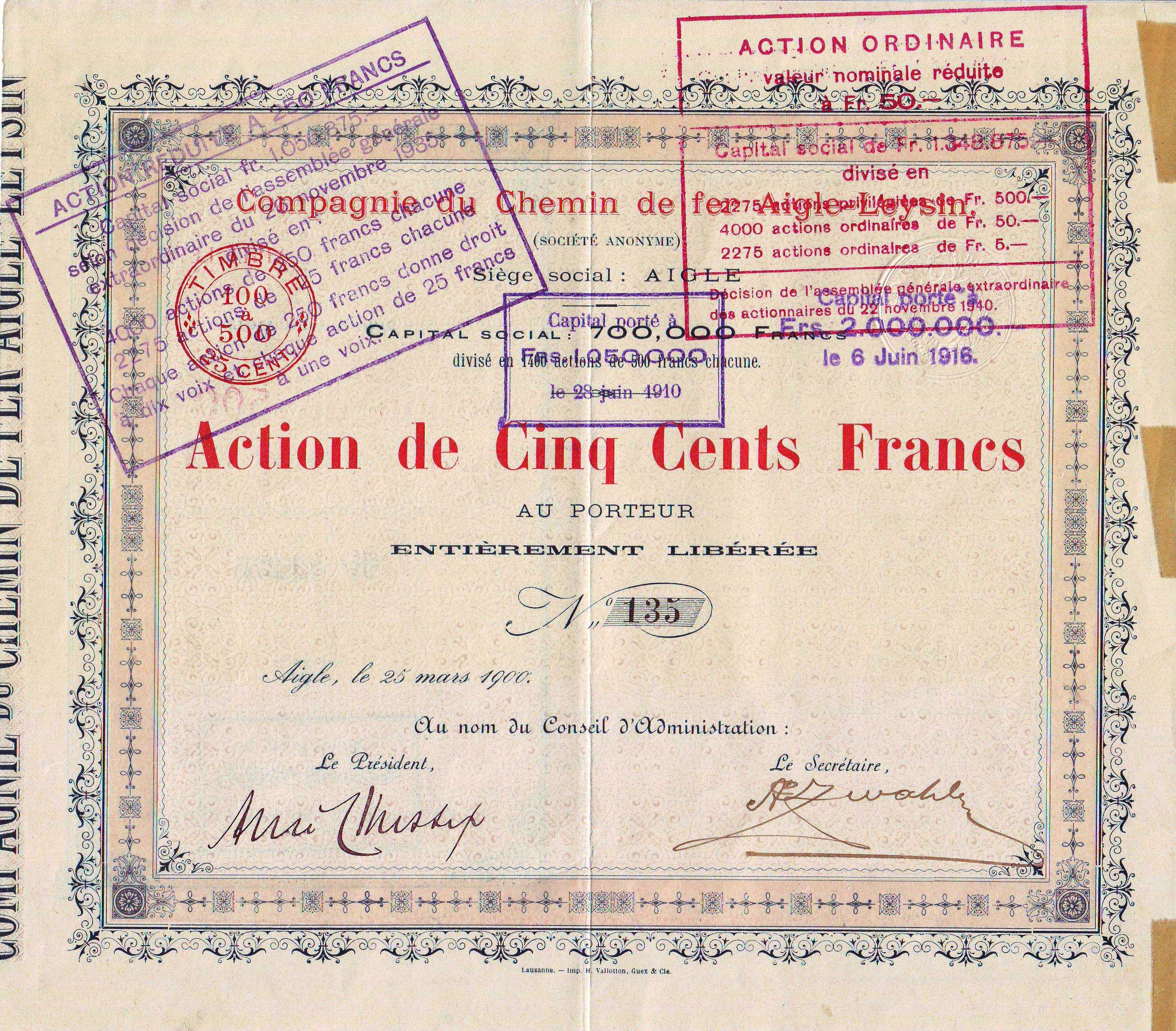
Share of the Compagnie du Chemin de fer Aigle-Leysin, issued 25. March 1900

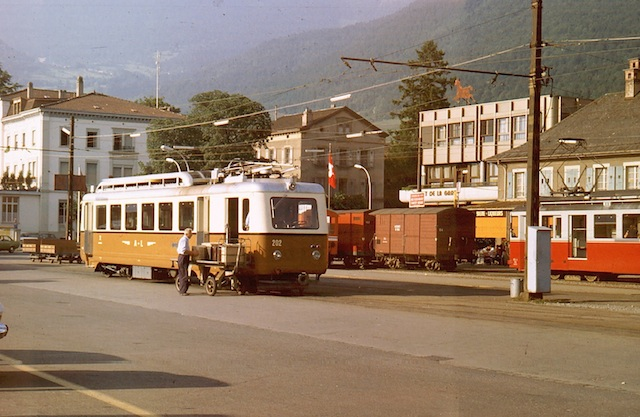
All three narrow gauge lines start outside Aigle CFF station: here in 1979

- 5 May 1900 : opening of the two kilometer long section Aigle JS station - Aigle Grand-Hôtel des Bains. The station Aigle JS of the Jura–Simplon Railways (JS) became the station Aigle CFF with the foundation of the Swiss Federal Railways in 1902, which is called Chemin de Fer Federaux Suisse (CFF) in the French-speaking part of the country. This section was laid out as a normal tramway used in adhesion operation. Due to 1:10 grade near the hotel, the tram had special emergency brakes system, where in case of bad track conditions brake beams with claws could be lowered into oak beams embedded in the road along the tracks in case of an emergency. The tramway line was operated by three two-axle streetcars build by SIG and CIE.
- 5 November 1900 : opening of the rack railway section Depot Aigle - Feydey (Leysin). The depot of the tramway was about half-way along the tramway line Aigle JS station - Aigle Grand-Hôtel des Bains on the other side of the river Grand Eau. The rack railway vehicles did not have ability to run themselves on the tramway because they were only equipped with rack drive. Therefore, the tramway cars took the rack cars from the railway station to the depot, where they could again run under their own power to Leysin.
- 1912 : The line between Leysin-Village et Leysin-Feydey is doubled
- September 1915 : Extension of the line to the current terminus at Leysin-Grand Hôtel.
- 31.August 1932 : Tramway operation between Aigle Pont-de-la-Grande-Eau and the Grand-Hôtel des Bains was stopped due to economic crises. The hotel closed in 1934 and did not open after World War II. The hotel was knocked down in 1947 as well as the tramway line between the former station Aigle Pont-de-la-Grande-Eau and the terminus at the hotel.
- In 1946, the rolling stock was renewed. The three tramway cars used for the Aigle tramway were scrapped. The Aigle CFF-Leysin route was operated by new vehicles able to operate on adhesion track as well as on rack railway track. Traction current voltage was raised from 650 to 1300 volts. This allowed the journey time to be reduced to around 30 minutes.

== The route ==
The Aigle–Leysin railway line is 6.5 km (4.04 mi) long and rises 1,047 m (3,435 ft) from its terminus outside the main line station in Aigle to its summit at the Grand Hôtel at Leysin. The first 1 km (0.6 mi) of the route is through the tight streets of Aigle, against car traffic, from the railway station to the railway depot where the train reverses to enable the powered vehicle to be at the rear of the train for the uphill journey, normal working on a rack (cog-wheel) railway. From this point the line climbs steeply through the vineyards, the steepest gradient being 1 in 4.3 (23%).

The operating voltage of the line has changed four times, increasing from 600 V DC at opening, first to 650 V DC, then in 1946 to 1300 V DC, and later to the present operating voltage of 1500 V DC.

== Mergers ==
In 1975 the four local railway companies, Aigle–Leysin, Aigle–Ollon–Monthey–Champéry, Aigle–Sépey–Diablerets and Bex–Villars–Bretaye (BVB) merged to form a single operating company, known as the Transports Publics du Chablais (TPC). This brought about increased co-operation between the companies in the provision of community-based services.

== Federal involvement ==
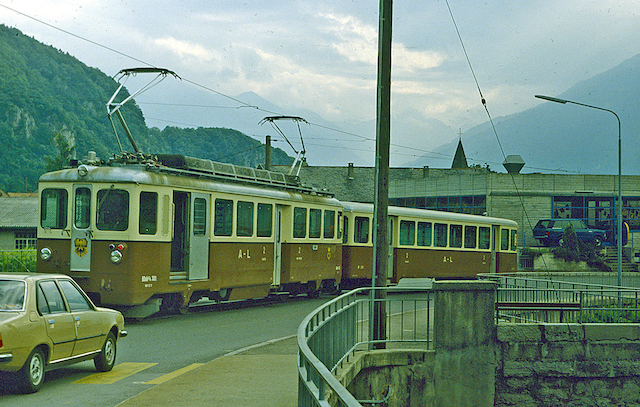
The line leaves Aigle as a street tramway

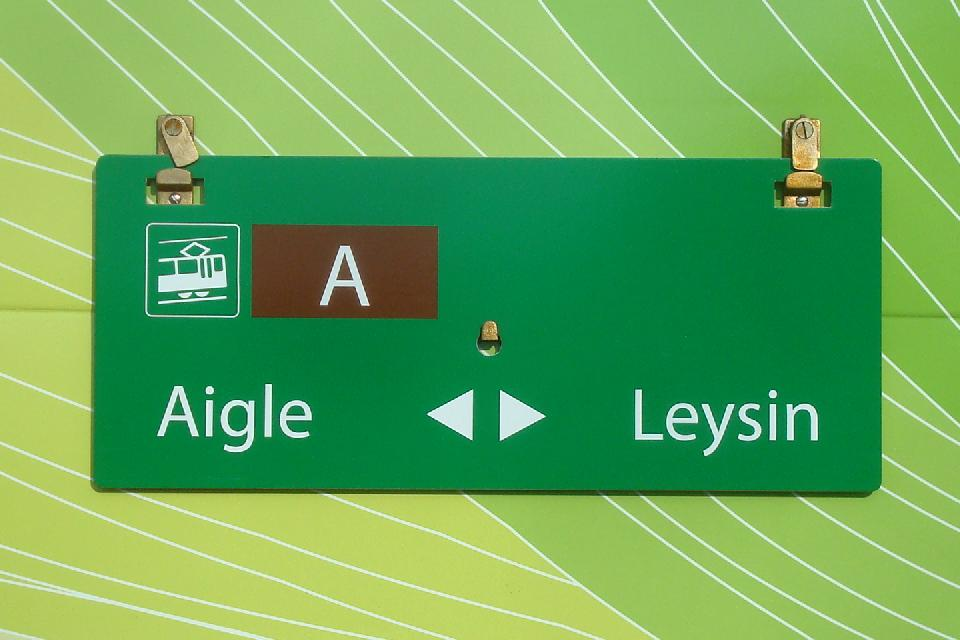
The route now operates as TPC line A

In 1985, the Federal Government informed the Aigle–Leysin Railway, and other privately operated railways, that it would cease all funding the following year, however they renewed a federal concession for a further period of 50 years. An agreement was signed between the Canton of Vaud, the communities served by the railway and the Aigle–Leysin Railway and its partners to renew rolling stock and upgrade the track.

In the mid-1990s, faced with greatly increased operating costs, the Canton of Vaud and the communities served by the railway petitioned the Federal Government to revoke its 1985 decision. The Federal Government did so and in 1996, recognizing the importance of this regional line as a public transportation carrier, awarded the line with a contract to provide a public transportation service. This brought about, in 1999, talks which resulted in the founding, the following year, of Transports Publics du Chablais as the parent body of local public transportation with the four local railway companies as founding members. The railway now operates as line A under the TPC banner.

== Rolling stock ==
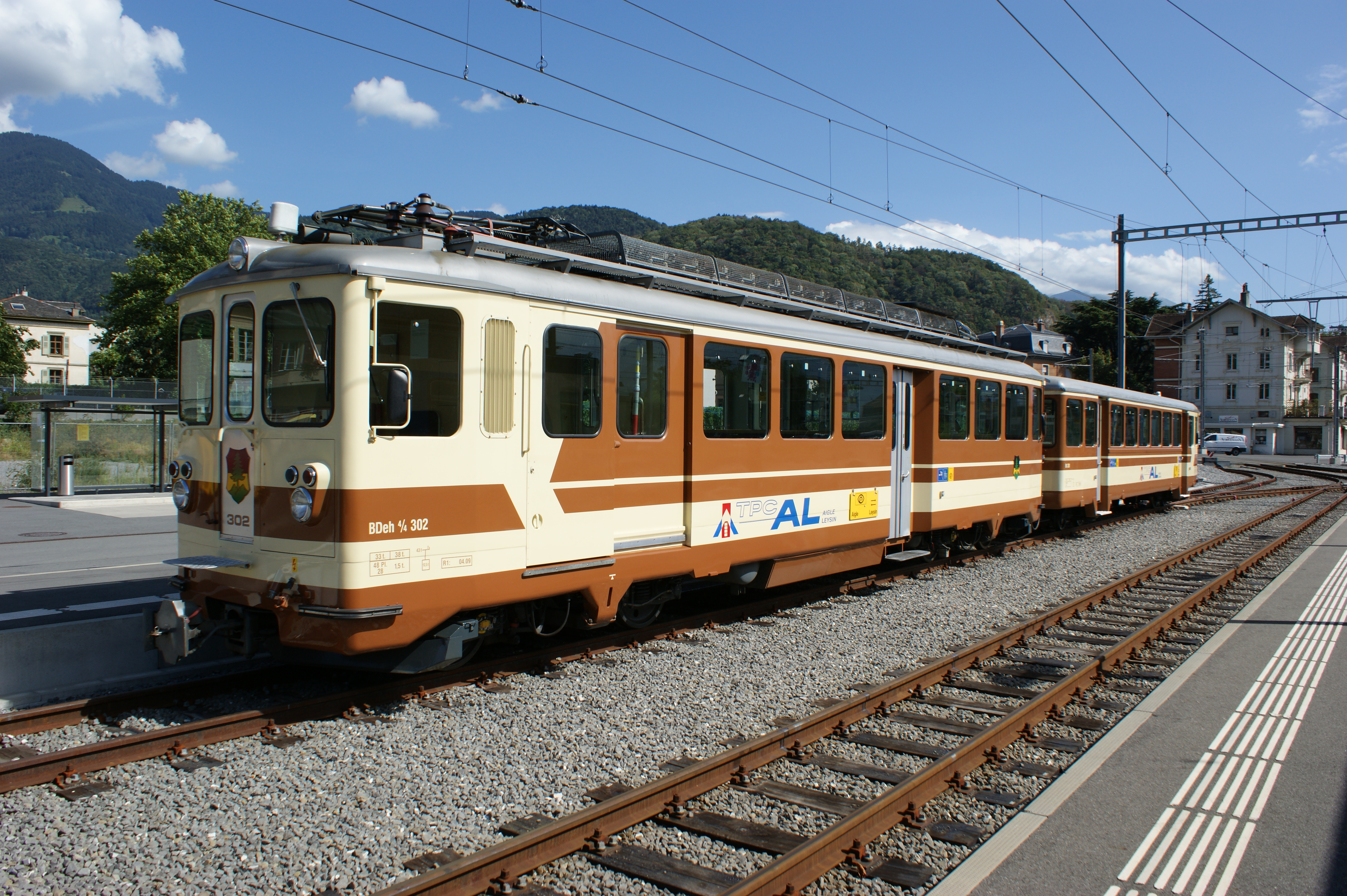
BDeh 4/4 No. 302 at Aigle in 2009 in the old light chocolate and cream livery

As of December 2017, Transports Publics du Chablais rostered two locomotives, one kleinlokomotive (French: tracteur), six railcars (French: automotrices), five driving trailers, two goods wagons, and six utility vehicles for service on the Aigle–Leysin line.
