= Aigle–Sépey–Diablerets railway line =

Local railway in Vaud and Valais cantons, Switzerland

Aigle–Sépey–Diablerets
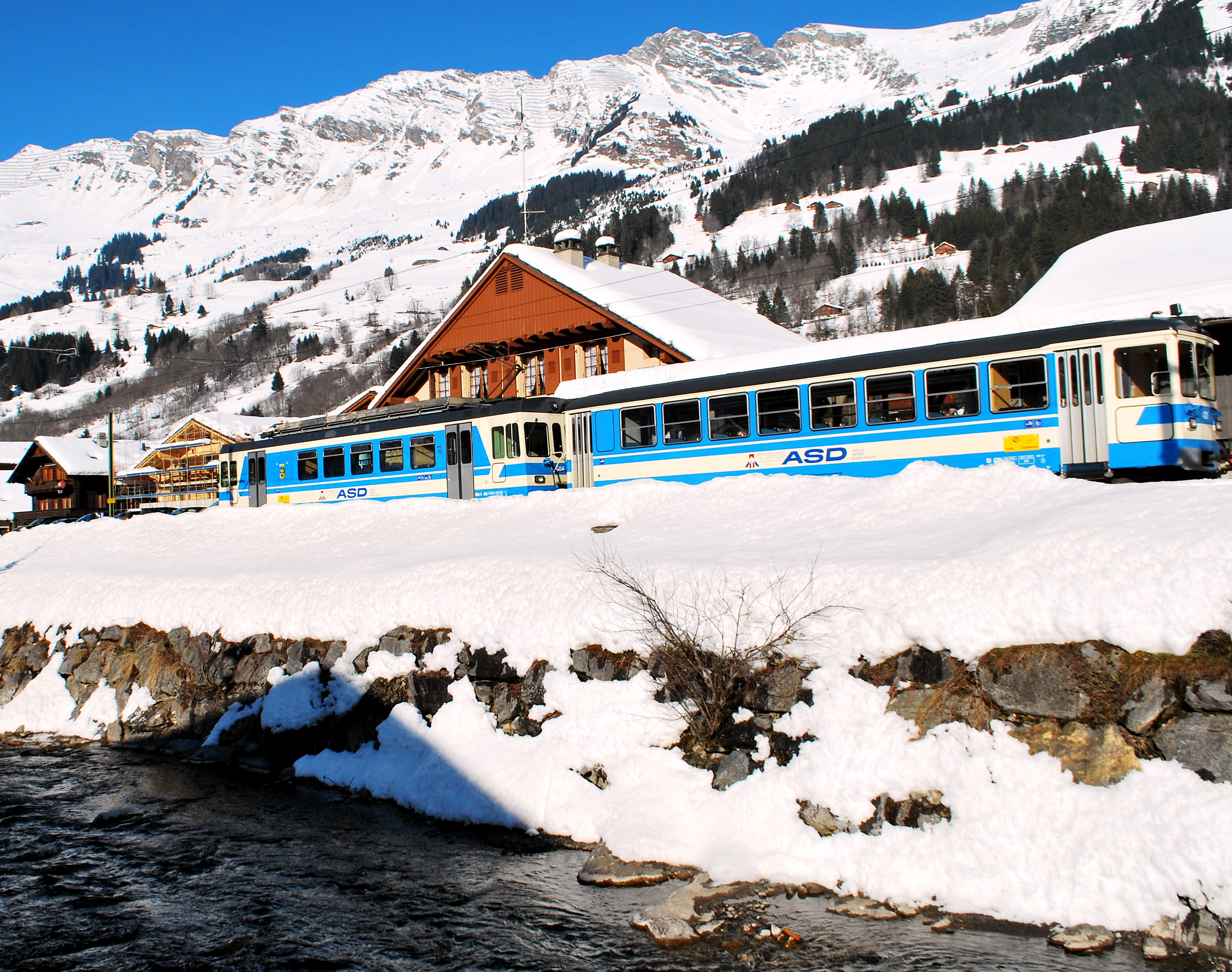
- Les Diablerets railway station, 2008.

Overview
- Owner: Transports Publics du Chablais

Service
- Operator(s): Transports Publics du Chablais

History
- Opened: 22 December 1913

Technical
- Line length: 22.3 km (13.9 mi)
- Track gauge: Metre (3 ft 3 3/8 in)
- Electrification: 1500 V DC
- Highest elevation: 1,175 m (3,855 ft)
- Maximum incline: 60‰

The Aigle–Sépey–Diablerets railway line is a railway line in the Chablais area of Vaud and Valais in Switzerland. It was built between 1913 and 1914 by the Chemin de fer Aigle-Sépey-Diablerets (ASD) and is today owned and operated by the Transports Publics du Chablais (TPC).

== History ==
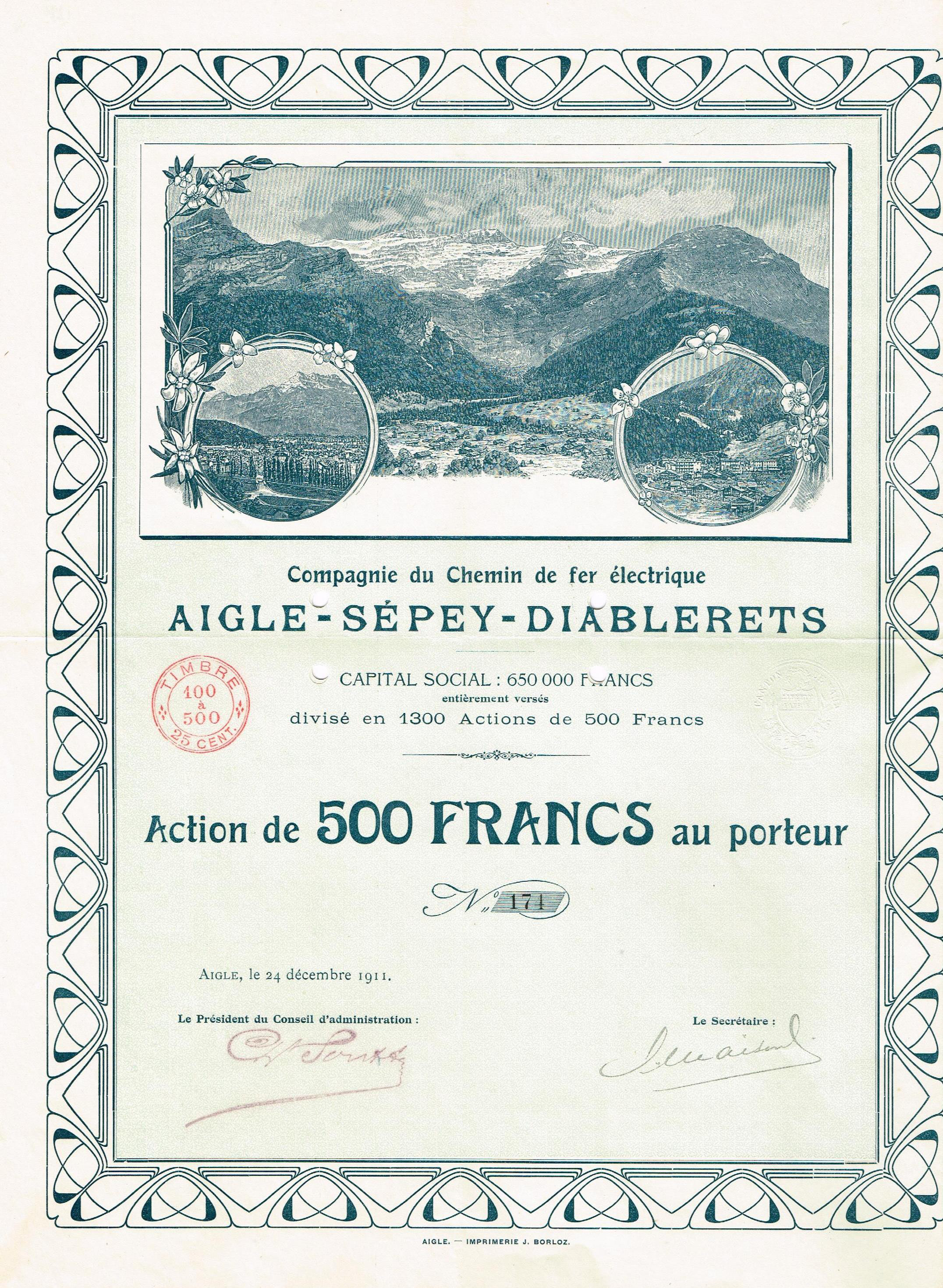
Share of the CdF Aigle-Sépey-Diablerets, issued 24. December 1911

Railways came to the Chablais area of Vaud and Valais in 1857 when the Lausanne – Simplon railway opened its line through Aigle. This was to act as the catalyst for other projects in the late 19th century which were designed to link the valley floor with communities in the mountains. The first scheme, which pre-dated the coming of the railway, was to link Aigle to Le Sepey by road. This opened in 1840 and services were provided by stagecoach.

On 24 October 1898 both Houses of the Swiss Parliament approved a concession application by the ASD to build and operate a railway between Aigle, Le Sépey and Leysin. Nine months later both Houses of the Swiss Parliament awarded a concession for a railway, not only linking Aigle, Le Sépey and Leysin but beyond, to Les Diablerets, Pillon and Saanen. However, following a new series of projects and concession applications, on 23 May 1905 the Berne Government finally approved the construction of a line between Aigle, Le Sépey and Les Diablerets on the left bank of the Grande Eau. The Federal Council accepted the railway's articles of incorporation on 28 February 1911. The line opened between Aigle and Le Sépey on 22 December 1913, and between Le Sépey and Les Diablerets on July 7 of the following year. The line was electrified from the start of operation, at 1500 V d.c.

The ASD put forward many railway projects in the early 20th century: a link with Gstaad via the Col du Pillon, connections with Chesières and Villars forming part of a grand Boulevard des Alpes linking Interlaken with Chamonix. Another project, like the previous examples, which met with fierce opposition, involved a link between Gryon and the highest point at Les Diablerets at an elevation of more than 3000 m.

The line is built to 1,000 mm (3 ft 3 3/8 in) gauge and has a length of 22.33 km with power, at 1500 V d.c., supplied by the Société des Forces Motrices de la Grande Eau from its plant at Pont de la Tine. Its lowest elevation is at the station at Aigle, 404 m (1,325 ft) above sea level, rising to 1,157 m (3,796 ft) at Les Diablerets Station, a total climb of 753 m (2,470 ft).

== The Great Fire ==
On the night of 26 June 1940, a fire destroyed the ASD depot. The railway's facilities destroyed, and three electric railcars and 4 passenger cars were lost. Following the tragedy there was speculation that the railway might be abandoned. However, a decision was made to save and restore as much as possible. ASD was able to lease rolling stock from other companies in order to ensure the continuation of the service.

At the same time, a Westinghouse system replaced the existing braking equipment so enabling the rolling stock to travel on the Chemin de fer Aigle-Ollon-Monthey-Champéry line.

== Consolidation ==
In 1975 the four local railway companies, Aigle-Leysin (AL); Aigle-Ollon-Monthey-Champéry (AOMC); Aigle-Sépey-Diablerets (ASD) and Bex-Villars-Bretaye (BVB) formed Transports Publics du Chablais SA (TPC). This brought about increased co-operation between the companies in the provision of community-based services.

In 1985, the Federal Government informed ASD, and other privately operated railways, that it would cease all funding the following year, however they renewed a federal concession for a further period of 50 years. An agreement was signed between the Canton of Vaud, the communities served by the railway and the ASD and its partners to renew rolling stock and upgrade the track.

In the mid-1990s, faced with greatly increased operating costs, the Canton of Vaud and the communities served by the railway petitioned the Federal Government to revoke its 1985 decision. The Federal Government did so and in 1996, recognizing the importance of this regional line as a public transportation carrier, awarded the line with a contract to provide a public transportation service. This brought about, in 1999, the founding of Transports Publics du Chablais as the parent body of local public transportation with the four local railway companies as founding members.

== Railcars and rolling stock ==
Details from official stock lists, May 2006.

- Railcars, Class "Bde4/4"
- Driving Trailers, Class "Bt" and "Arst"
- Non-Driving Trailers, class "B2"/"B2r", "Ars" and "By"

Number	Name	Class	Builders Details.	Date Completed	Notes
1		BDe 4/4	SWS/BBC	1913	Painted Alpine Livery
2		BDe 4/4	SWS/BBC	1913	Painted Alpine Livery
401	Ormonts Dessus	BDe 4/4	ACMV/BBC	1987	
402	Ormonts Dessous	BDe 4/4	ACMV/BBC	1987	
403	Ollon	BDe 4/4	ACMV/BBC	1987	From Summer 2010 liveried in new tpc two tone green scheme.
404	Aigle	BDe 4/4	ACMV/BBC	1987	
34		B2r		1913	24 seat trailer car
35		B2		1913	24 seat trailer car (1)
421		Ars		1966	Ex-BTB No.62. Rebuilt 1984, Painted with alpine meadow scene
431	Chez Rose	Bt		1966	Ex-BTB No.26. Rebuilt 1984, Painted, alpine rose livery
432		Bt	Schindler/BBC	1966	Ex-BTB No.21. Rebuilt 1984
433		Arst	Schindler/BBC	1966	Ex-BTB No.27. Rebuilt 1984 as "salon bar" coach
434		Bt	Schindler/BBC	1966	Ex-AOMC, Rebuilt 2000
881-9		By		1994	
884-3		By		1995	

Abbreviations:

- ACMV : Ateliers de constructions mécaniques de Vevey
- BBC : Brown, Boveri & Cie.

Notes:

- (1) Coach returned from Chemin de fer de La Mure.

== Gallery ==
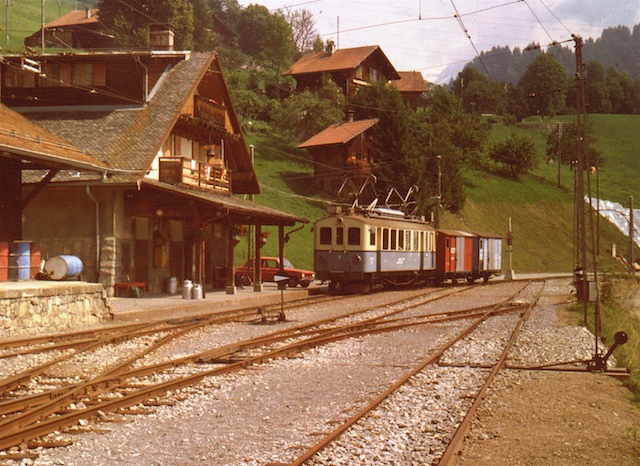
Goods traffic was still handled in 1979

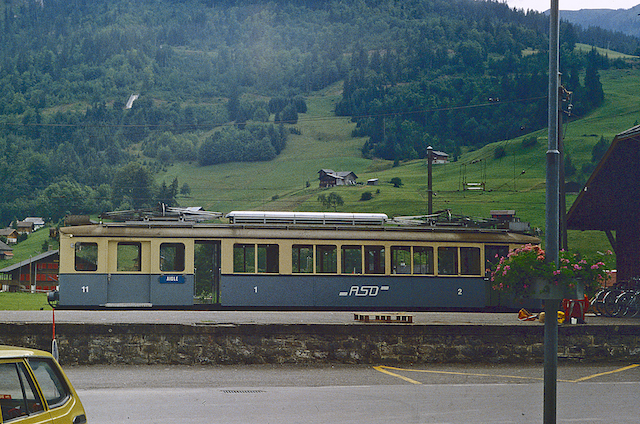
Most 1914 cars were unchanged in 1979, though some were rebuilt after the 1940 fire

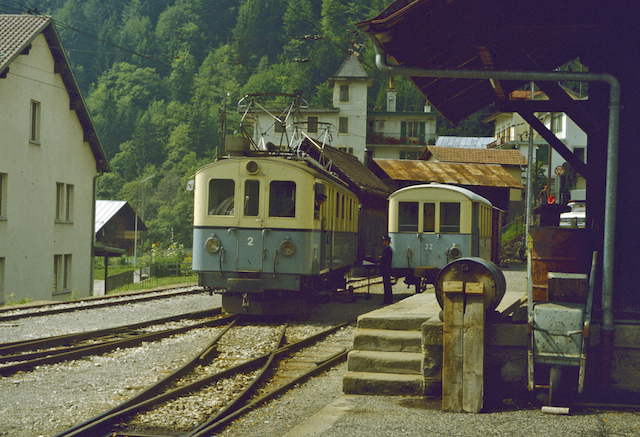
Through trains reverse at Le Sepey, with motor cars running round their trailers

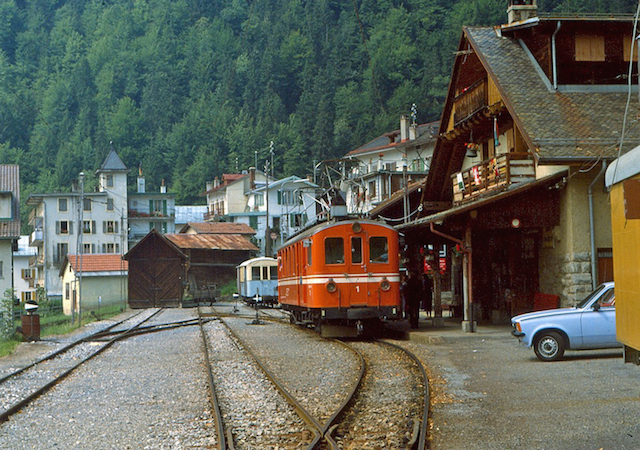
Repainted 1914 railcar at Le Sepey

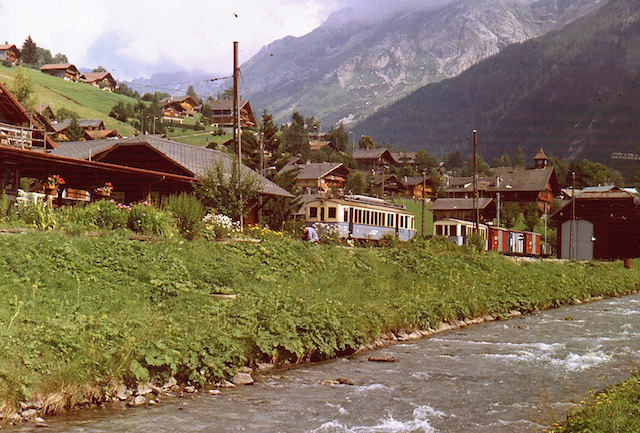
The Diablerets terminus in 1979

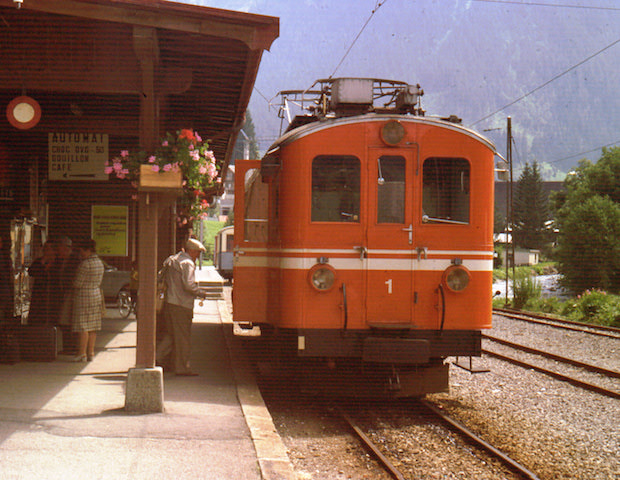
The original rolling stock at Diablerets in 1979

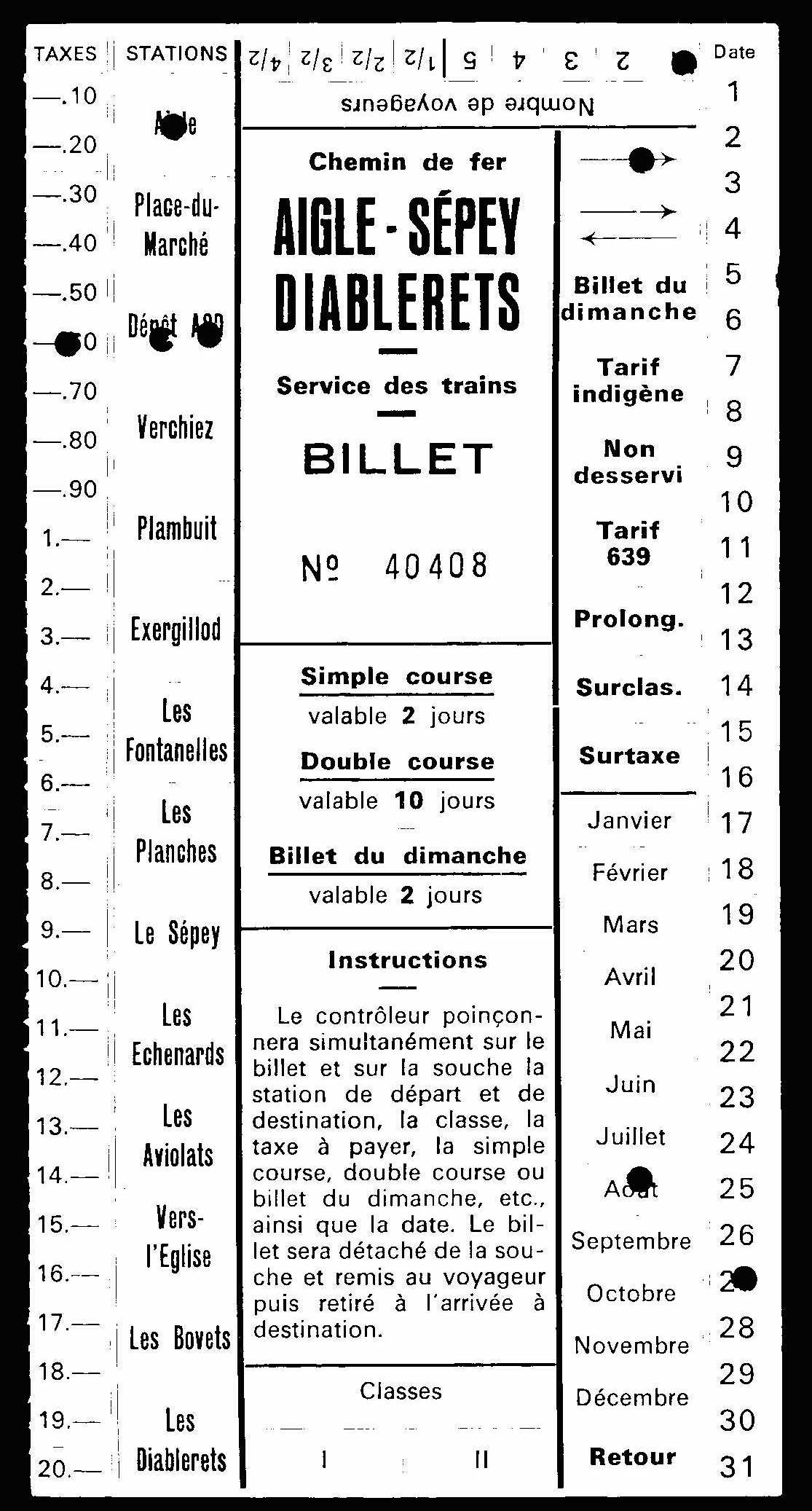
ASD ticket
