= Transports Publics du Chablais =

Transport company in Switzerland

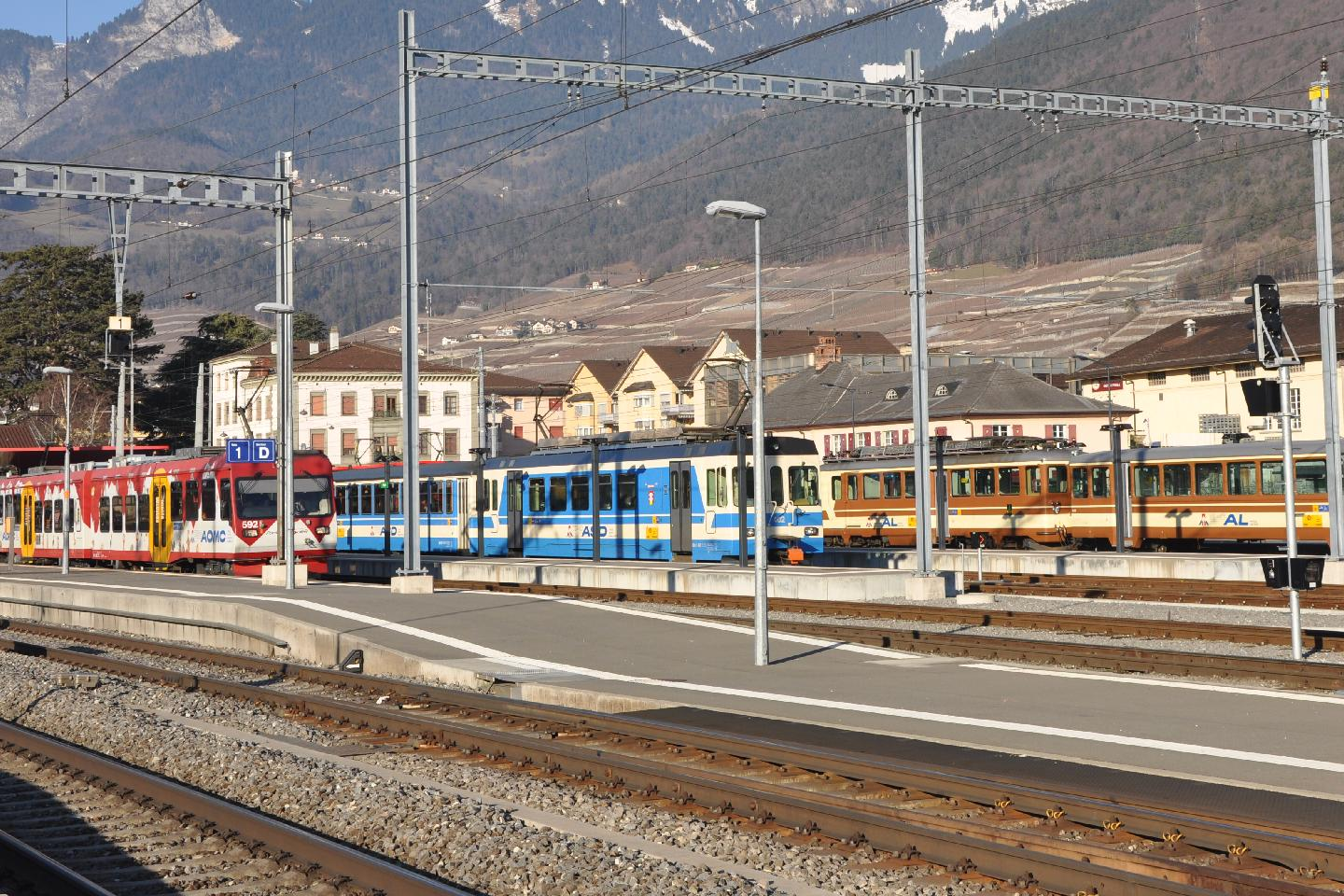
- Aigle train station with AOMC, ASD and AL trains (from left to right)

Technical
- Track gauge: 1,000 mm (3 ft 3 3/8 in)

The Transports Publics du Chablais (TPC) is a transportation company that operates various rail and bus services in the Chablais region, at the eastern end of Lake Geneva. It was formed in 1999 from the merger of four companies.

== History ==
A precursor of the TPC was the Transports Publics du Chablais Operating Community (French: a Communauté d'exploitation des Transports Publics du Chablais), which was formed in 1975 to improve coordination between various companies in the Chablais region. Three railways were involved at first:

- Chemin de fer Aigle-Leysin (AL)
- Chemin de fer Aigle-Sépey-Diablerets (ASD)
- Chemin de fer Bex-Villars-Bretaye (BVB)

A fourth, the Chemin de fer Aigle-Ollon-Monthey-Champéry (AOM), joined in 1977. The four companies merged on 1 January 1999.

The TPC has also developed its bus lines by operating several of these at the request of local authorities : Tonkin bus service (Aigle-Vionnaz-St. Gingolph), Aigle-Villeneuve bus service as part of the Réseau Express Vaudois commuter system, municipal bus service in Aigle, and the Bex-Monthey bus line in partnership with PostBus.

== Investment ==
The investments are significant and constitute a major burden for some of the local communities but with the stringent management methods imposed by the 1996 Railway Reform Act, applicable to all concession transport companies, TPC is responsible for staying within the budget negotiated with the cantonal and federal authorities. However the company still continues to receive the support in recognition of the domestic and tourism value of an attractive public transport system.

Key projects, taking the system into the first years of the new millennium, have involved a three-year programme, at a cost of CHF 42 million, to completely rebuild Aigle's Place de la Gare in partnership with the local authority and the Swiss Federal Railways (SBB/CFF/FFS). The project, which has seen new platforms brought into use at the main station to accommodate the AL, ASD and AOMC, adjacent to those of the SBB/CFF/FFS, also included the construction of AOMC track alongside CFF track towards the new Transports Publics du Chablais depot and workshops at En Châlex. A special ceremony was held on Saturday, 6 October 2007 to mark the completion of the work. With approximately 3 million passengers using its facilities each year Aigle is the second most important station in Vaud after Lausanne. (Source : Le bleu matin, 8.10.2007).

On 27 August 2007 it was announced that major works, involving extensive, temporary, closures requiring trains service replaced by buses, would take place over the winter months involving all the Transports Publics du Chablais railway lines.

There are also plans, for the extension of the Aigle-Leysin line towards the Berneuse gondola. If this extension happens passengers will be able to travel, with transfers, to a site which has views of the Alps, Jura and Lake Geneva.

== Landslide problems ==
Following research into landslide problems on sections of the line it was found necessary to carry out urgent work. The Aigle-Sepey-Diablerets line closed for one week over the Christmas and New Year period 2006/7 and for a month from 27 March 2007, following the end of the high season for tourists, the largest users of the line. This is not a new problem for the line which needs work to stabilise the adjacent soil and rock, much of which is covered in coniferous forest. The work was carried out in four stages, the initial work being to erect just over 150 m of mesh barrier to prevent falling rock reaching the line and to offer protection to the workers on later stages of the scheme when supporting walls were rebuilt. During the work the trains were replaced by bus services covering the affected parts of the line. The total cost of CHF 1.5 million, seen as an investment by the Transport Public Chablais, saw the line fully reopened by the end of April 2007.

== From ASD, AL, AOMC, and BVB railways of the TPC ==
The ASD (Aigle-Sepey-Diablerets) railway routes east from Aigle to the ski resort of Diablerets. The AL (Aigle-Leysin) railway routes east from Aigle to the ski resort and grand vista of Leysin. The AOMC (Aigle-Ollon-Monthey-Champerey) railway routes west from Aigle to the ski resort of Champery. These railways plus the BVB (Bex-Villars-Bretaye) which railway routes east from Bex, a village just south of Aigle are operated by Transports Publics du Chablais with motto: "Depuis plus de cent ans et contre toute attente, des lignes des TPC reunissent plaine et montagne, Vaud et Valais, ville et campagne, terres catholiques et protestantes." Translated roughly: "For over 100 years and contrary to all expectations, the railways of TPC have joined plain and mountain, town and country, of the Vaud and Valais districts of Switzerland, land of both Catholics and Protestants." The ASD, the AL, and the BVB railways operate in the Canton of Vaud. The AOMC operates into the Canton of Valais when it leaves Aigle and crosses the Rhone river to reach Monthey and Champery.

In 2010 the railway took a step towards a unified brand image with the introduction of a two - tone green livery for its units.

== Line lengths and voltages ==
Passengers carried: In 2007 TPC carried 2.1 million passengers, producing 14.5 million passenger-km. In 2008, after opening of the new narrow-gauge platforms in Aigle and the new depot, it was decided to change the voltage on the AOMC line from 900 to 1500 V DC. Some AOMC trainsets were adapted while older ones will be retired. Some AL and ASD trainsets reach the new depot trackage under reduced power.

- BVB: 17 km narrow gauge (1000 mm), electrified at 650 VDC.
- AOMC: 23 km narrow gauge (1000 mm), electrified at 850 VDC.
- AL and ASD: 6.2 km and 23 km narrow gauge (1000 mm), electrified at 1500 VAC.
