= Aigle–Ollon–Monthey–Champéry railway line =

Railway line in Switzerland

Aigle–Ollon-Monthey-Champéry

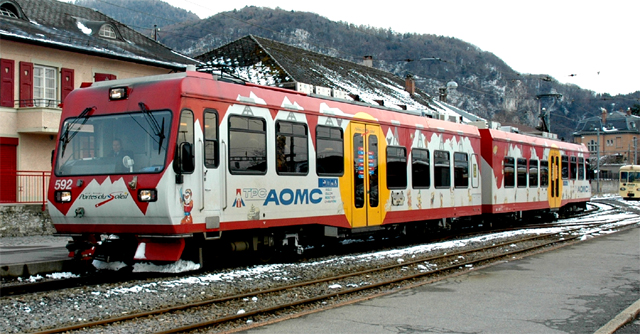

Overview
- Owner: Transports Publics du Chablais
- Termini: Aigle; Champéry, Switzerland

Service
- Operator(s): Transports Publics du Chablais
- Depot(s): Aigle

History
- Opened: 1907-1908

Technical
- Line length: 23.138 km (14.377 mi)
- Rack system: Strub
- Track gauge: Metre (3 ft 3 3/8 in)
- Electrification: 1500 V DC
- Highest elevation: 1,047 m (3,435 ft)
- Maximum incline: 13.5 %

The Aigle–Ollon–Monthey–Champéry railway line is a metre-gauge railway line in the Chablais region of Switzerland. It was originally built by the Chemin de fer Aigle–Ollon–Monthey (AOM) in 1907–1908. Ownership passed to the Chemin de fer Aigle-Ollon-Monthey-Champéry (AOMC) in 1946. Today, it is part of the Transports Publics du Chablais. Trains originate from bay platforms at Aigle, adjacent to the Simplon line of Swiss Federal Railways.

== History ==
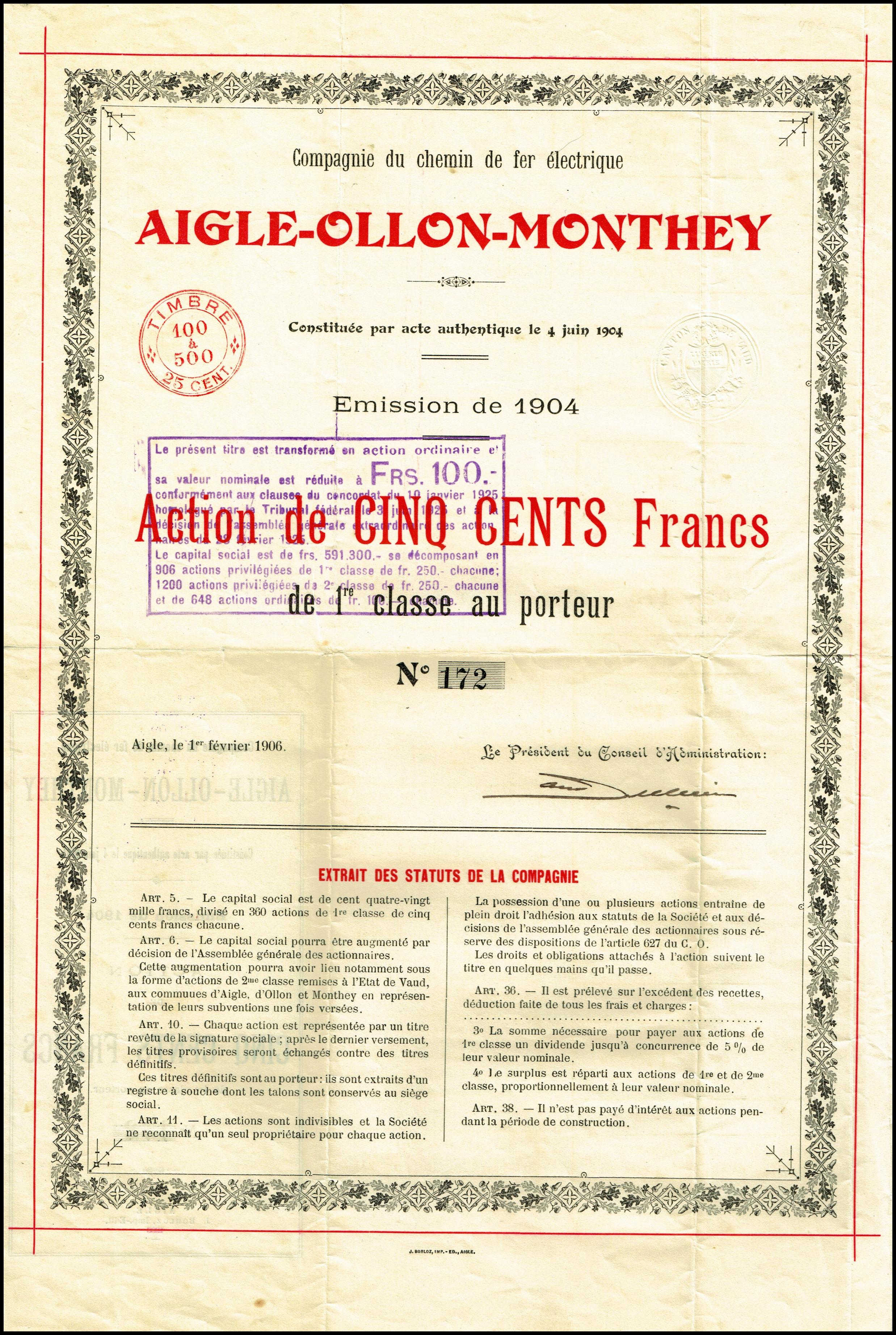
Share of the Compagnie du chemin de fer électrique Aigle-Ollon-Monthey, issued 1 February 1906

The original intention had been to construct a railway from Aigle to Villars via Ollon and the concession was awarded on 27 April 1897. The Chemin de fer Bex-Gryon-Villars, however, strongly objected to the new line, arguing that there was insufficient traffic for two lines to serve Villars. After listening to the arguments, the federal authorities agreed and the original concession was withdrawn to be replaced by a new one for a line from Aigle to Monthey via Ollon. Concession to build the line was awarded on 6 February 1899 and was followed by that for a line from Monthey to Champéry on 22 June of the same year. The latter would be built by the Chemin de fer Monthey-Champéry-Morgins (MCM).

The AOM opened to traffic on 3 April 1907. Construction of the line to Champéry was slower and this was not ready for traffic by the time of the opening of the AOM, but took place on 30 January 1908. The plans for a line from the village of Val d'Illiez to Morgins were scrapped following poor profit forecasts.

From 1 January 1946 the two companies amalgamated to form the AOMC and plans were put forward to bring the line up to date. With regard to the rolling stock for the line, this meant the construction of four new railcars of Series BDeh4/4, numbered 511–4, which were delivered in 1954.

Passenger rolling stock has been regularly updated since that time, with the latest delivery, two twin-car railcars (numbered 591 and 592), arriving in 2001.

Although the line to Morgins was not built, the present day system does include a short, one kilometre section from the town station in Champéry to Champéry-Planachaux, where a lift forms part of the public access to the mountains.

Nowadays the AOMC is part of a larger, regional system operated, along with local bus services, by the Transports Publics du Chablais.

== The line ==
The line, built to a metre gauge, is 23.14 km (14.38 mi) in length of which 3.66 km (2.274 mi) is operated on the Strub rack system at a maximum gradient of 13.5%. The line rises from 404 m (1,325.5 ft) at Aigle to a height of 1,049 m (3,441.6 ft) at Champéry, a total rise of 645 m (2,116.1 ft). It is electrically operated by overhead contact at 850 V DC.

Important investment plans were developed by the AOMC in 1995. One plan involved the construction of a large maintenance workshop and stockholding facility. This work was completed and opened by the TPC in 2001. The new dépôt at En Châlex, alongside the line a short distance east of Aigle has over 26,500 sq.m. of space available for workshops and nowadays is the main depot for the three TPC narrow gauge lines in Aigle. Space is also available on the site for expansion in the future should this be required.

In 2006 the TPC commenced a programme of building works at Aigle in collaboration with the CFF/SBB/FFS. This was to bring together all three of the metre gauge lines at new platforms adjacent to those of the main line company. Work was completed in early 2007 when the services were brought together; the AOCM making use of the two platforms nearest the main line. These platforms feature new lighting and public address systems and have easy access from the town's Place de la Gare.

== Rolling stock ==
Vehicle Type	Running No.	Name	Series No.	Builder	Date	Rebuilt	Notes
Automotrice	101	Yvorne	Be 4/4	Schindler/BBC	1966	1985	Ex-BTB No.14, Adhesion only
Automotrice	102	Chablais	Be 4/4	Schindler/BBC	1966	1985	Ex-BTB No.12, Adhesion only
Automotrice	103	Collombey-Muraz	Be 4/4	Schindler/BBC	1966	1985	Ex-BTB No.13, Adhesion only
Automotrice	104	Ollon	Be 4/4	Schindler/BBC	1966	1985	Ex-BTB / scrapped 2007
Automotice	105	Aigle	Be 4/4	Schindler/BBC	1966	1985	Ex-BTB No.11, Adhesion only
Automotrice	501	Vaud	BDeh 4/4	ACMV/SLM/BBC	1986		(a)
Automotrice	502	Valais	BDeh 4/4	ACMV/SLM/BBC	1987		(a)
Automotrice	503	Europe	BDeh 4/4	ACMV/SLM/BBC	1992		
Automotrice	511	Champéry	BDeh 4/4	Schindler/BBC	1954		Rack equipped, Out of order
Automotrice	512	Val d'Illiez	BDeh 4/4	Schindler/BBC	1954		Rack equipped
Automotrice	513	Monthey	BDeh 4/4	Schindler/BBC	1954		Rack equipped
Automotrice	514	Troistorrents	BDeh 4/4	Schindler/BBC	1954		Rack equipped
Automotrice-Double	591		Beh 4/8	BT/Stadler	2001		Rack equipped
Automotrice-Double	592	Portes-du-Soleil	Beh 4/8	BT/Stadler	2001		Rack equipped
Voiture pilote	132		Bt	Schindler/BBC	1966	1985	Driving Trailer
Voiture pilote	133		Bt	Schindler/BBC	1966	1985	Driving Trailer / scrapped 2007
Voiture pilote	134		Bt	Schindler/BBC	1966	1985	Driving Trailer
Voiture pilote	531		Bt	ACMV/BBC	1987		Driving Trailer (a)
Voiture pilote	532		Bt	ACMV/BBC	1987		
Voiture voyageur	122		B2		1932		2nd class coach/now VFV
Voiture voyageur	523		B	ACMV	1967		2nd class coach (b)
Voiture voyageur	524		B	ACMV	1968		2nd class coach (b)
Voiture voyageur	525		B	ACMV	1969		2nd class coach (b)

- (a) Builders plate shows 1986, delivery was in 1987
- (b) Not in service at present.

== Gallery ==
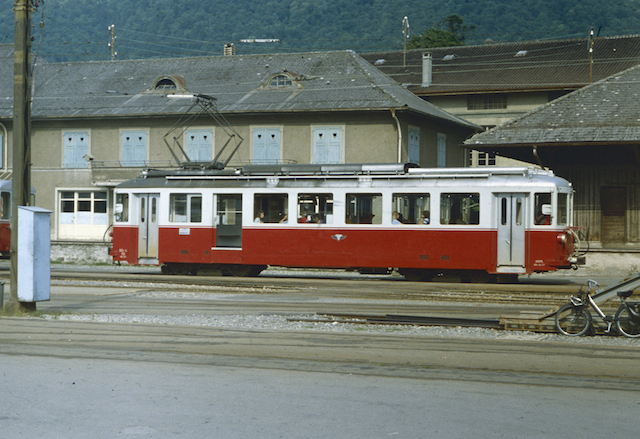
AOMC car outside Aigle CFF station

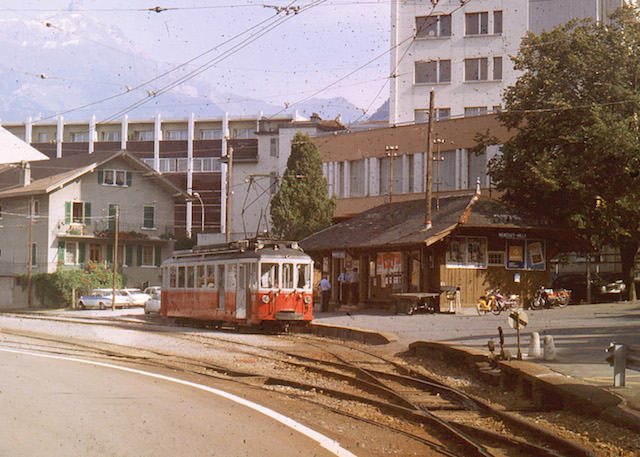
The former Monthey Ville terminus, September 1979

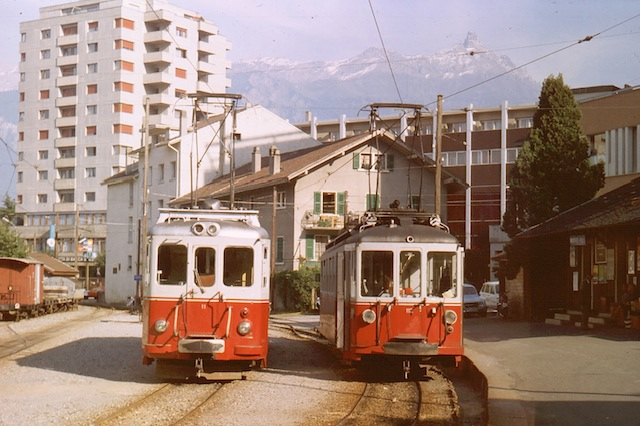
Two railcars at Monthey in 1979. The terminus is now located further out of the town

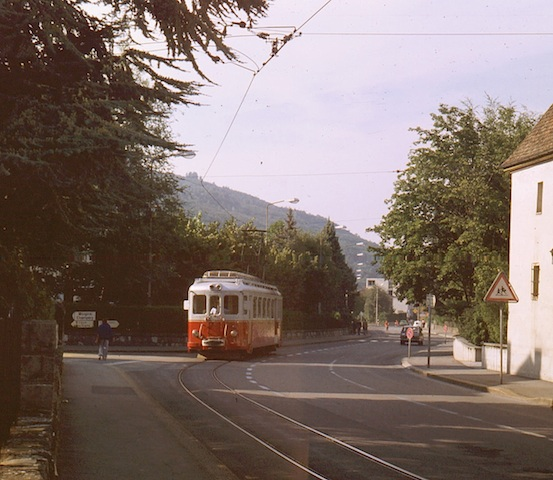
The AOMC left Monthey as a street tramway

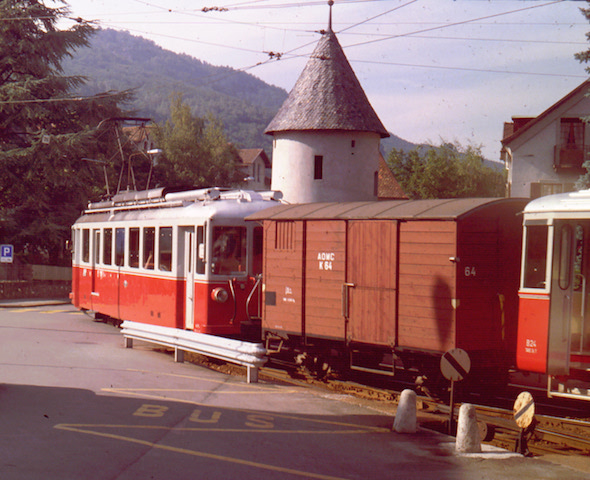
In 1979, goods and postal traffic was still handled

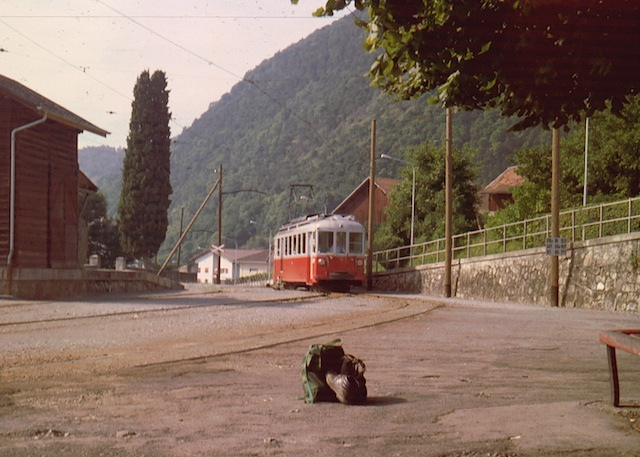
The intermediate station and passing loop at Ollon

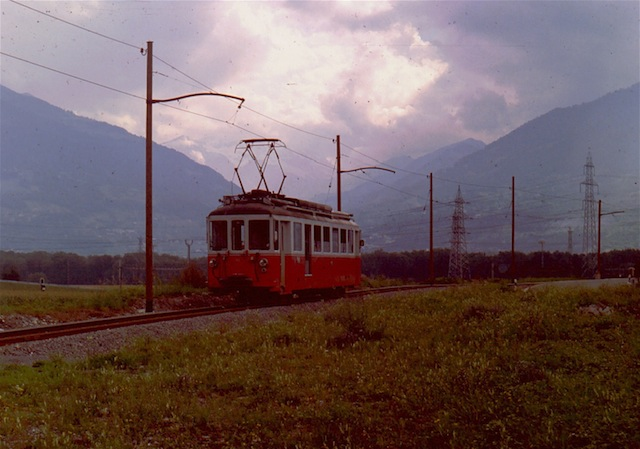
A car leaves St Triphon, September 1979

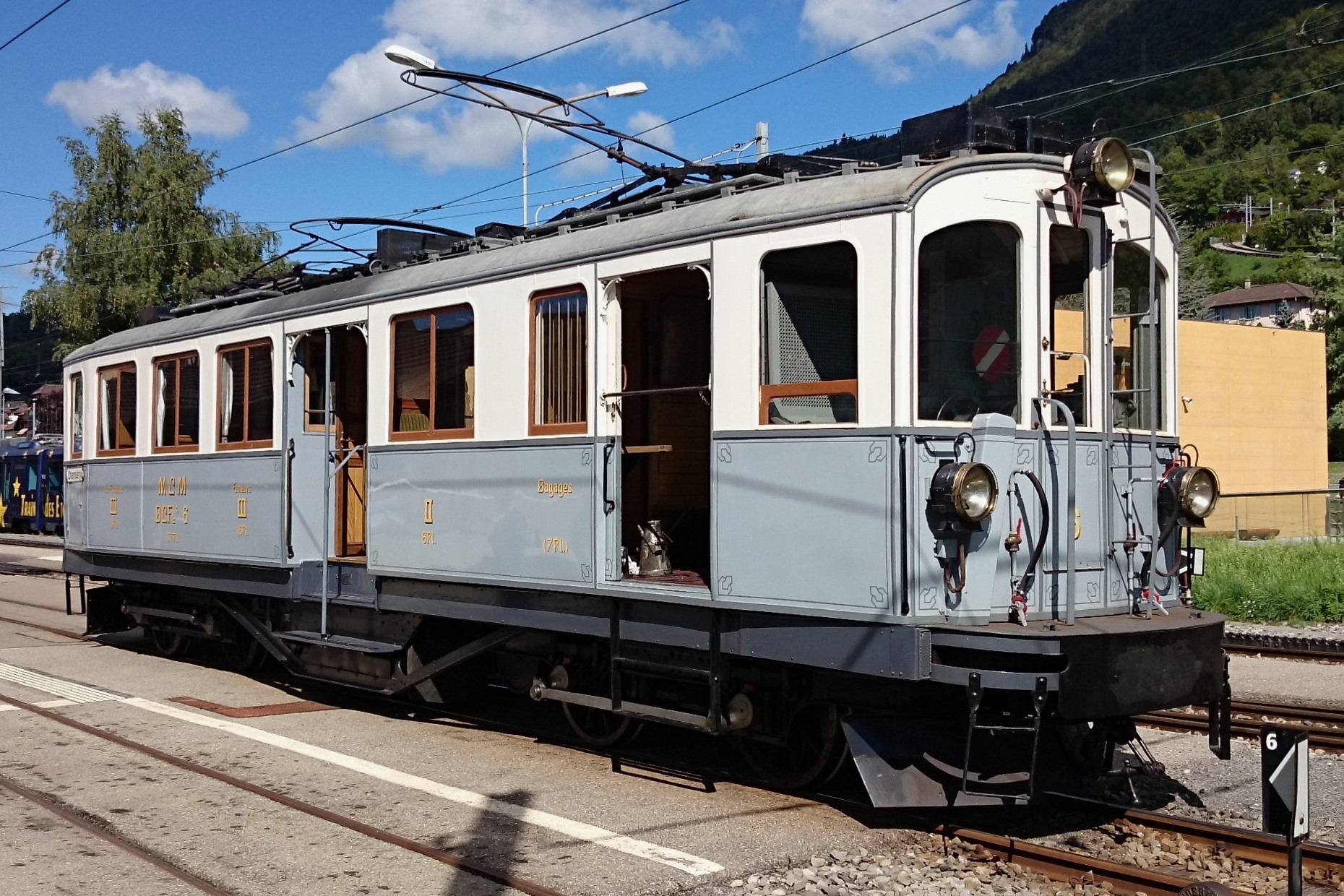
Old electric railcars BCFeh 4/4 6 of the Monthey–Champéry–Morgins-Railway on the Blonay–Chamby heritage railway, September 2015

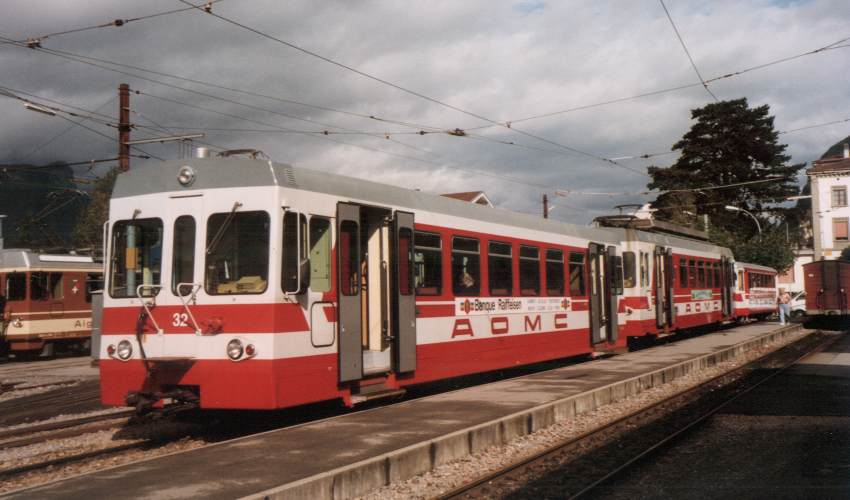
AOMC shuttle in Aigle station

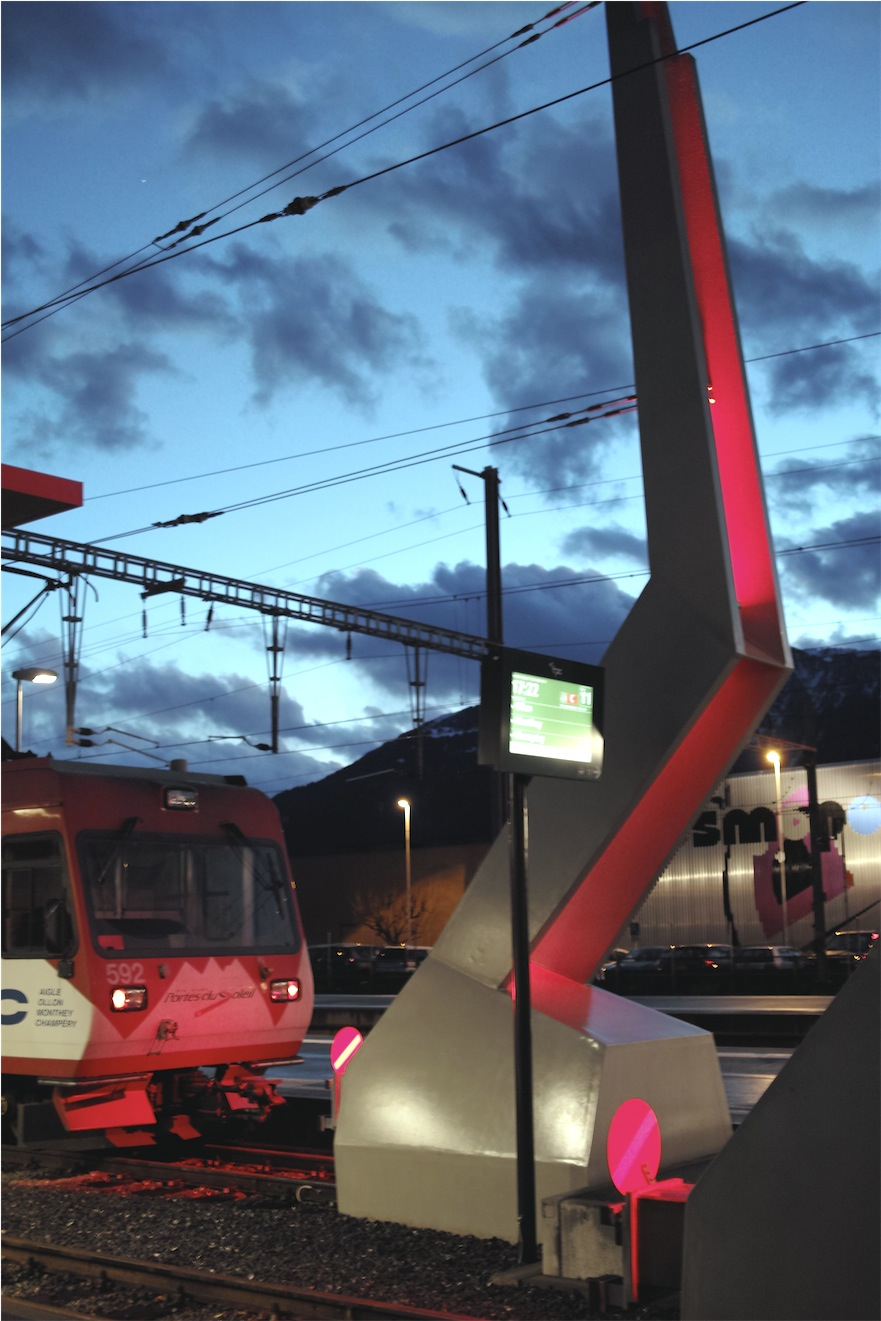
AOMC train in the new Aigle station

== Abbreviations ==
- ACMV Ateliers de constructions mécaniques de Vevey
- BBC Brown, Boveri & Cie
- BTB Birstigtalbahn (Baselland Transport)
- BT Bombardier Transportation (Vevey)
- SLM Swiss Locomotive and Machine Works, Winterthur.
