= Ergnaud Castle (Bex, Switzerland) =

Coordinates: 46.2623504°N 7.0401444°E

The Castle of Ergnaud (or "Ergnau") is an historic ruin located on a hill close to Plan-Saugey, in the municipality of Bex, Switzerland.

== History ==
The castle, or fort, dating from the 12th century, was likely meant to communicate with the Castle of Bex (the Duin Tower) and the fort of Seguin.
