= Duin Tower =

Coordinates: 46.24131°N 7.02105°E

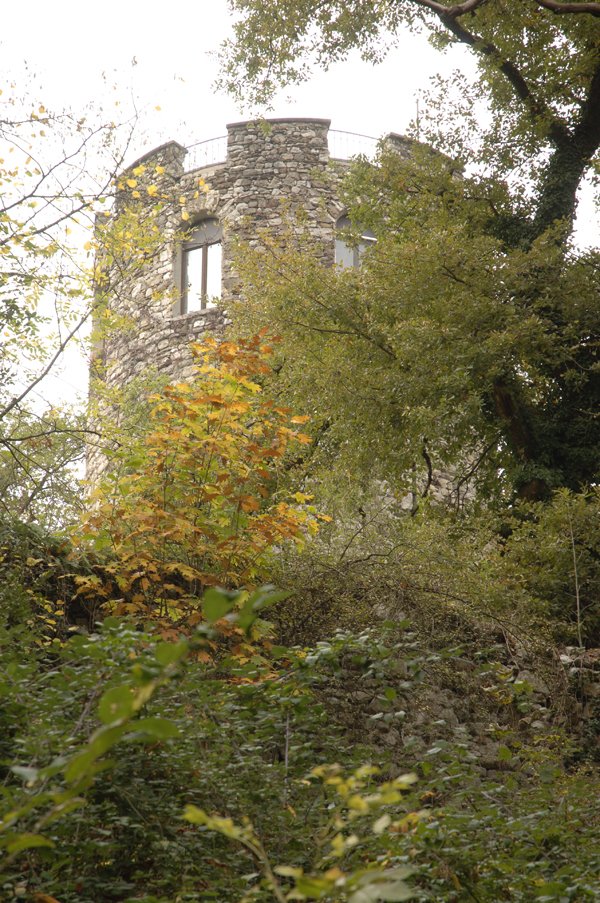
Duin Tower

The Tower of Duin is the last remaining tower of a former medieval castle located on a hill south of Bex, Switzerland.

== History ==
The castle was built during the 13th century and subsequently abandoned in 1641 after it was burnt during the Burgundian wars. The former castle was connected to the Ergnaud Castle.

For more information you can read the official website from La Tour de Duin www.tourdeduin.ch
