= Pauvres Pass (Bex, Switzerland) =

Mountain pass

Coordinates: 46.2330076°N 7.0833743°E

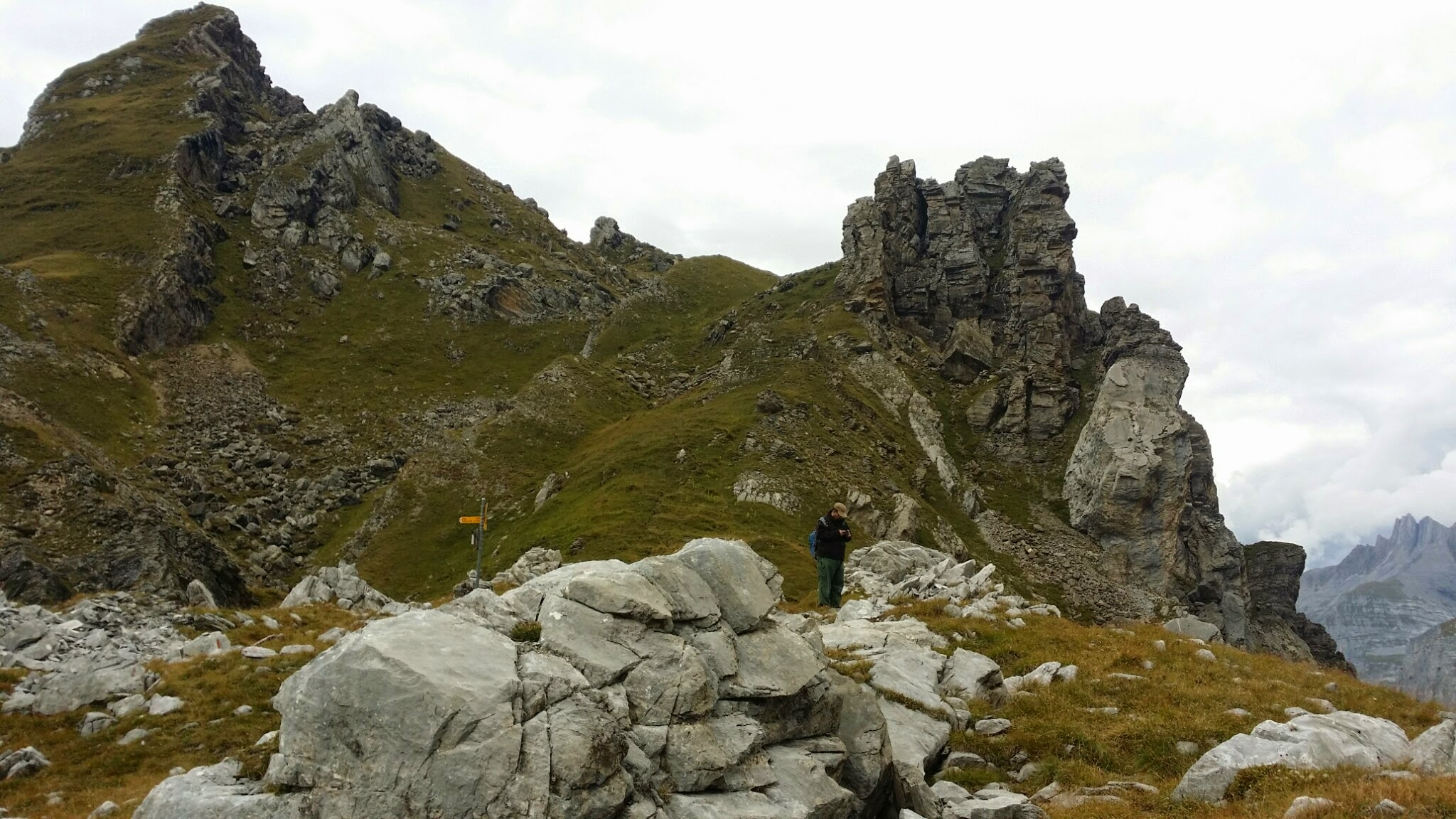
Pauvres Pass

The Pauvres Pass is a 2111 meters high mountain pass located in the municipality of Bex, Switzerland.
