= Gabriel Forneret Monument =

Coordinates: 46.244985°N 7.021229°E

The Forneret Monument, a memorial located in the village of Bex, commemorates the battle of the Col de la Croix and the fallen soldiers from Bex.

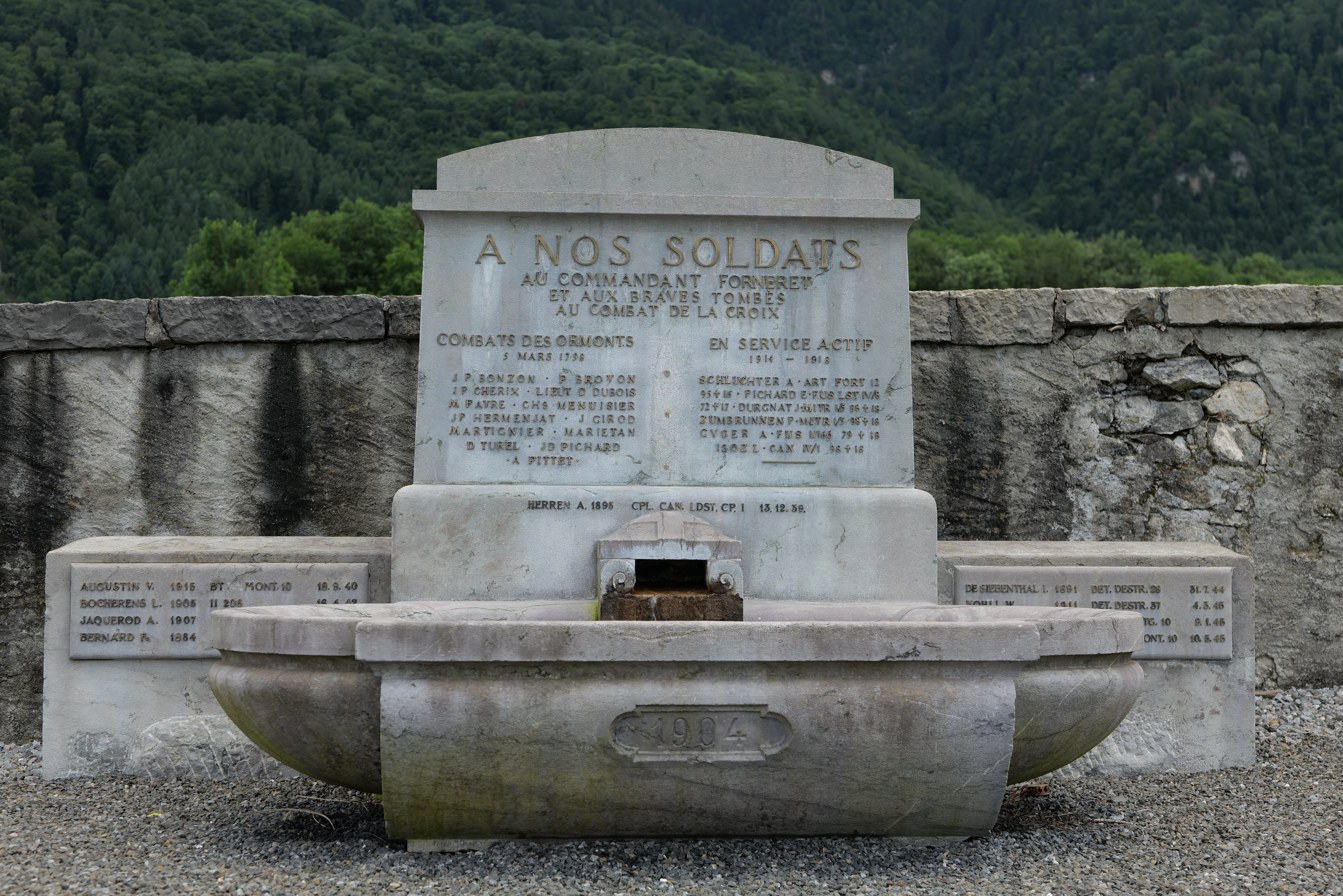
the Forneret Monument in its current location

The monument was built on April 19, 1925 on the market square of Bex. The battle it commemorates, which opposed the Ormonts militia loyal to the Canton of Bern and the occupying French troops supported by local volunteers during the French invasion of Switzerland, occurred 127 years earlier, on March 5, 1798. However, the town authorities had initially promised to place a tombstone bearing the following marking "Traveller, here lies Forneret. Run if you are a tyrant, sit if you are a brother". The other side of the tombstone would have beard the writing "On this tomb, following the victory of March 5 and 6 1798, Mangourit, resident of the French Republic, received the oaths of eternal fraternity from the French, the Vaud and the valais people, in arms for the world's freedom".

As the construction of the monument took place after the first world war, it was decided to add the names of the local soldiers deceased during the mobilization of the first world war. After the 1945, two additional memorial plaques were built in order to commemorate local soldiers who died during following active duty.

During the summer 2019, the town council moved the monument from the market square to the village cemetery.
