= Javerne =

Coordinates: 46.2367594°N 7.0622287°E

Javerne is an alpine pasture located in the municipality of Bex, in Switzerland. The name of the locality might be used to describe the little valley itself: "vallon de Javerne".

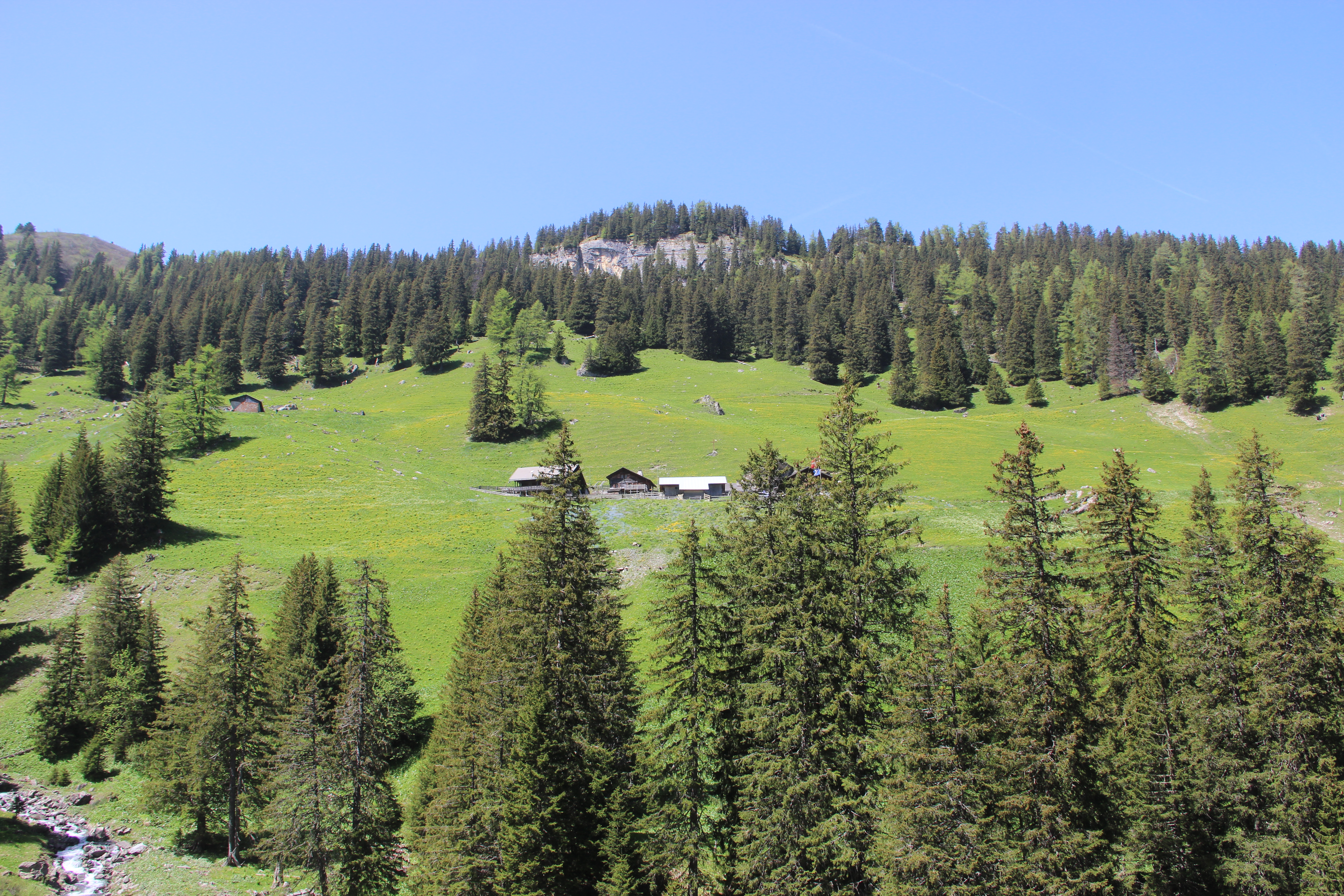
Javerne farm buildings
