= Gryon =

- Municipality
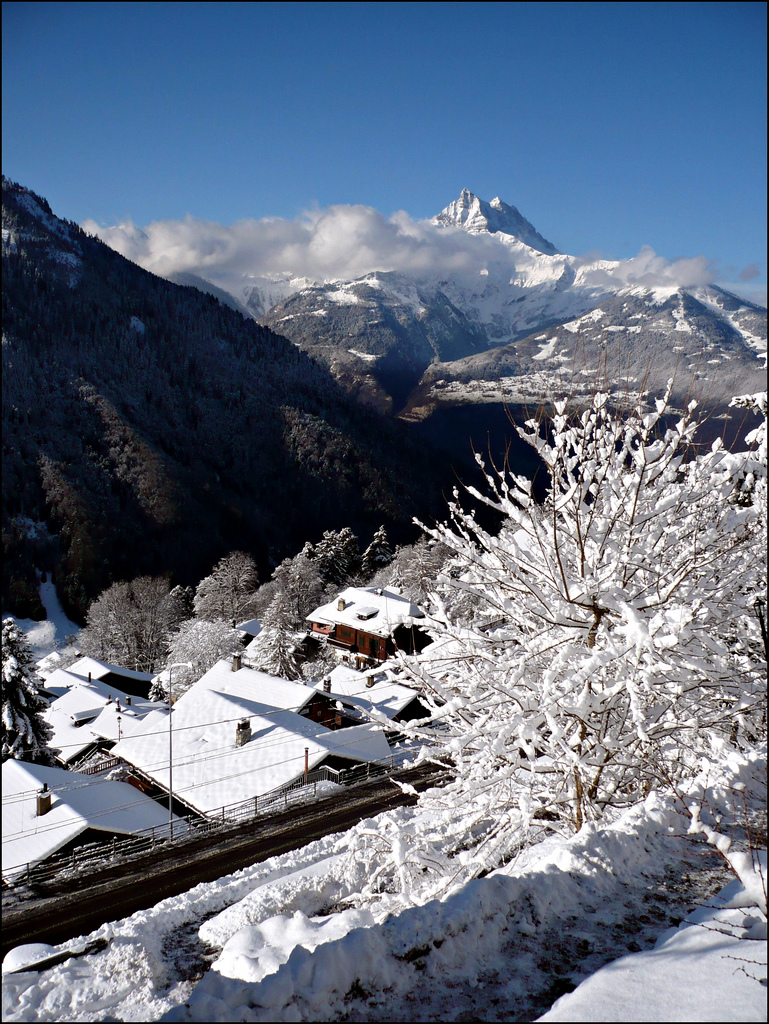
- Gryon village

- Flag Coat of arms
- Location of Gryon
- Location within Switzerland Location within Canton of Vaud
- Coordinates: 46°16′N 7°04′E
- Country: Switzerland
- Canton: Vaud
- District: Aigle

Government
  - Mayor: Syndic; Pierre-André Burnier (PLR)

Area
  - Total: 15.22 km^{2} (5.88 sq mi)
- Elevation: 1,114 m (3,655 ft)

Population (2007)
  - Total: 1,142
  - Density: 75.03/km^{2} (194.3/sq mi)
- Demonym: Les Tachis
- Time zone: UTC+01:00 (CET)
  - Summer (DST): UTC+02:00 (CEST)
- Postal code: 1882
- SFOS number: 5405
- ISO 3166 code: CH-VD
- Localities: La Barboleusaz, Les Pars
- Surrounded by: Ollon, Ormont-Dessus, Bex
- Website: gryon.ch

Gryon (French pronunciation: [gʁijɔ̃]) is a municipality of the canton of Vaud in Switzerland, located in the district of Aigle. The entire village of Gryon and the Taveyanne area are designated as part of the Inventory of Swiss Heritage Sites.

== Geography ==
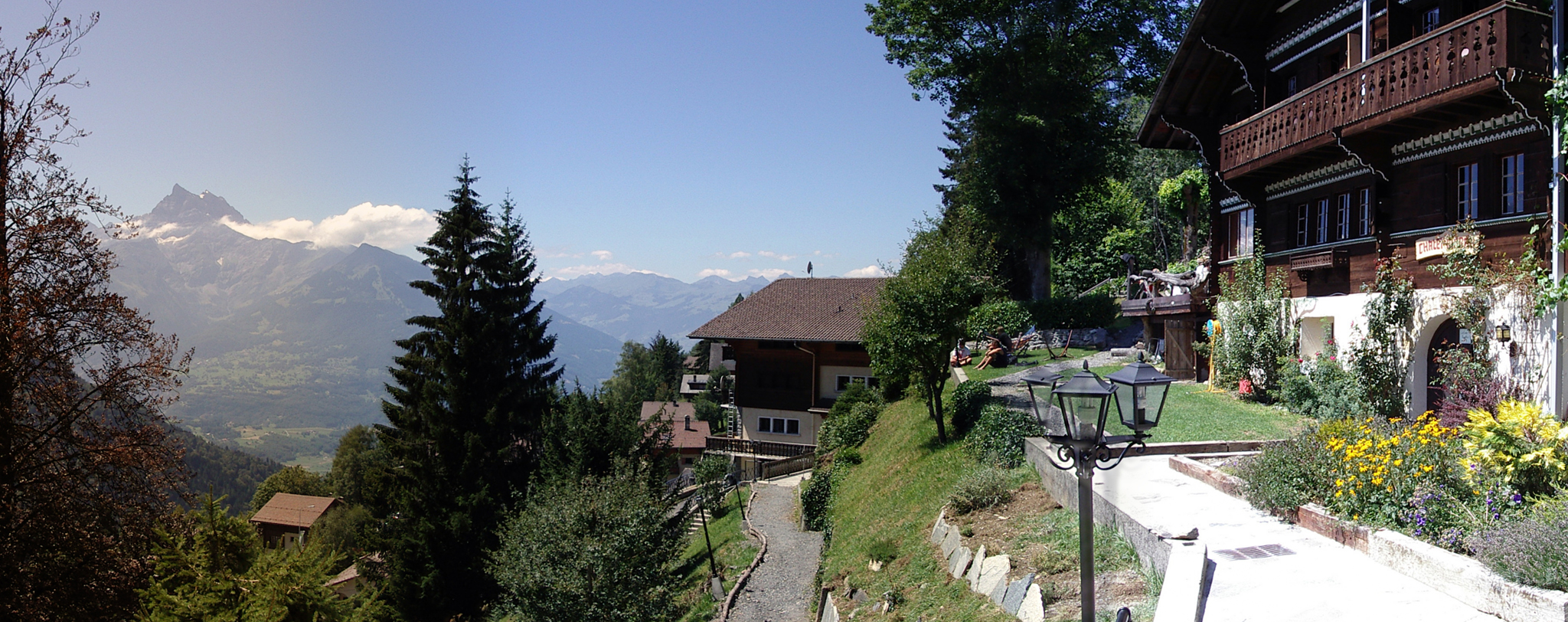
Chalets in Gryon

The municipality is located in the Aigle district, on a narrow terrace at an elevation of 1,110 m (3,640 ft) between the Gryonne and Avançon canyons. The commune is composed of multiple settlements, which include the Gryon village, Barboleuse, Alpe des Chaux, Taveyanne, and Peuffeyre. In the western part behind the forests lies the alpine pasture of Taveyanne. The highest point of the commune reaches 2'620 m a.s.l. on the slopes of mountain Culan, which is part of the Diablerets massif. The lowest point is located at an altitude of 680 m at Peuffeyre next to the river Avançon d'Anzeinde.

Gryon's neighbouring communes are Bex, Ollon, and very partially Ormont-Dessus. The eastern and northern borders were established with Bex back in 1676.

Gryon has an area, as of 2021, of 15.22 square kilometers (5.88 sq mi). Of this area, 4.31 km^{2} (1.66 sq mi) or 28.3% is used for agricultural purposes, while 7.94 km^{2} (3.07 sq mi) or 52.2% is forested. Of the rest of the land, 1.71 km^{2} (0.66 sq mi) or 11.2% is settled (buildings or roads), 0.07 km^{2} (17 acres) or 0.5% is either rivers or lakes and 1.37 km^{2} (0.53 sq mi) or 7.8% is unproductive land.

Of the built up area, housing and buildings made up 7.9% and transportation infrastructure made up 2.9%. Out of the forested land, 42.1% of the total land area is heavily forested and 4.2% is covered with orchards or small clusters of trees. Of the agricultural land, 0.0% is used for growing crops and 7.0% is pastures and 21.3% is used for alpine pastures. All the water in the municipality is flowing water. Of the unproductive areas, 4.3% is unproductive vegetation and 3.5% is too rocky for vegetation.

Aerial view (1964)

== History ==
Gryon is first mentioned in 1189 as Griuns. The old records dating until 1867 recite Grion as the commune's name.

Before 1189 the territory of Gryon was part of the Bex region but following the generous donation of Peter von Gruins the territory would progressively become the property of the Abbey of Saint-Maurice.

During the Bernese reign (1484–1789), Gryon gained a special status by remaining under the jurisdiction of the Abbey of Saint-Maurice while also having a General Council in Gryon (court of justice was based in Gryon while appeals had to be made at the bottom of the valley in Salaz). Until the Reformation (around 1539), Gryon was part of Bex's parish, which itself was part of the diocese of Sion.

After the old regime's fall, Gryon became part of the newly formed canton of Leman (1798–1803), which was consequently renamed Vaud after the Act of Mediation. In 1798, the commune was attributed to the Aigle district, which remains part of today.

Towards the second half of the 19th century, the region became more open by constructing novel infrastructure. A motorable road was inaugurated in 1857, while the rack railway (Bex-Gryon-Villars-Chesières (BGVC)) opened in 1900. In 1895 an electric factory of Peuffeyre was constructed.

In parallel, the poet Juste Olivier passed the later stages of his life in Gryon (1871–1876) where he wrote the famous song "Mi-été de Taveyeane", which was first sung in 1869. In 1875, he published his work "Sentiers de Montagne", leaving a lasting mark on the history of Gryon through his contributions to the commune. In the meantime, people from Lausanne and Geneva increasingly come to pass summer in Gryon. The first known holiday chalet was constructed in 1860. From 1900s winter tourism became increasingly popular with the apparition of skis. In 1942, the two railway lines, BGVC and Villars-Bretaye fused to form a new train track Bex-Villars-Bretaye (BVB). In 1956, the gondola lift linking Gryon to les Chaux was realised, which was soon followed by a construction boom in the ski area. From the 1970s, a tourist complex was developed in the Alpe des Chaux.

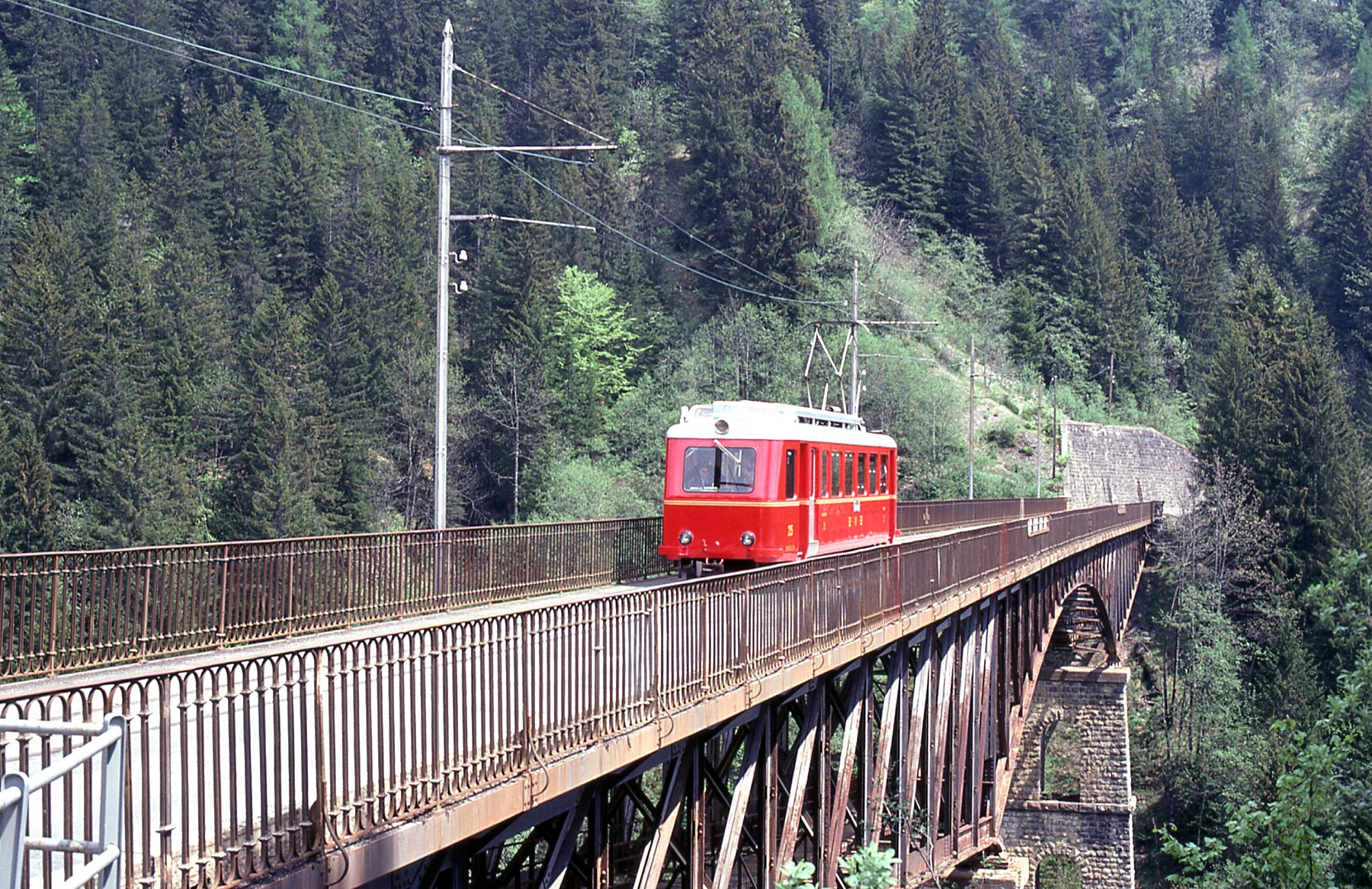
Old train passing over the bridge heading towards Villars-sur-Ollon

The bridge over Gryonne (originally constructed in 1901) which provided a direct link with Villars-sur-Ollon was reconstructed in 1980.

== Coat of arms ==
The blazon of the municipal coat of arms is Gules, under a Cross Bottony Argent two Axes of the same handled Or in saltire.

== Demographics ==
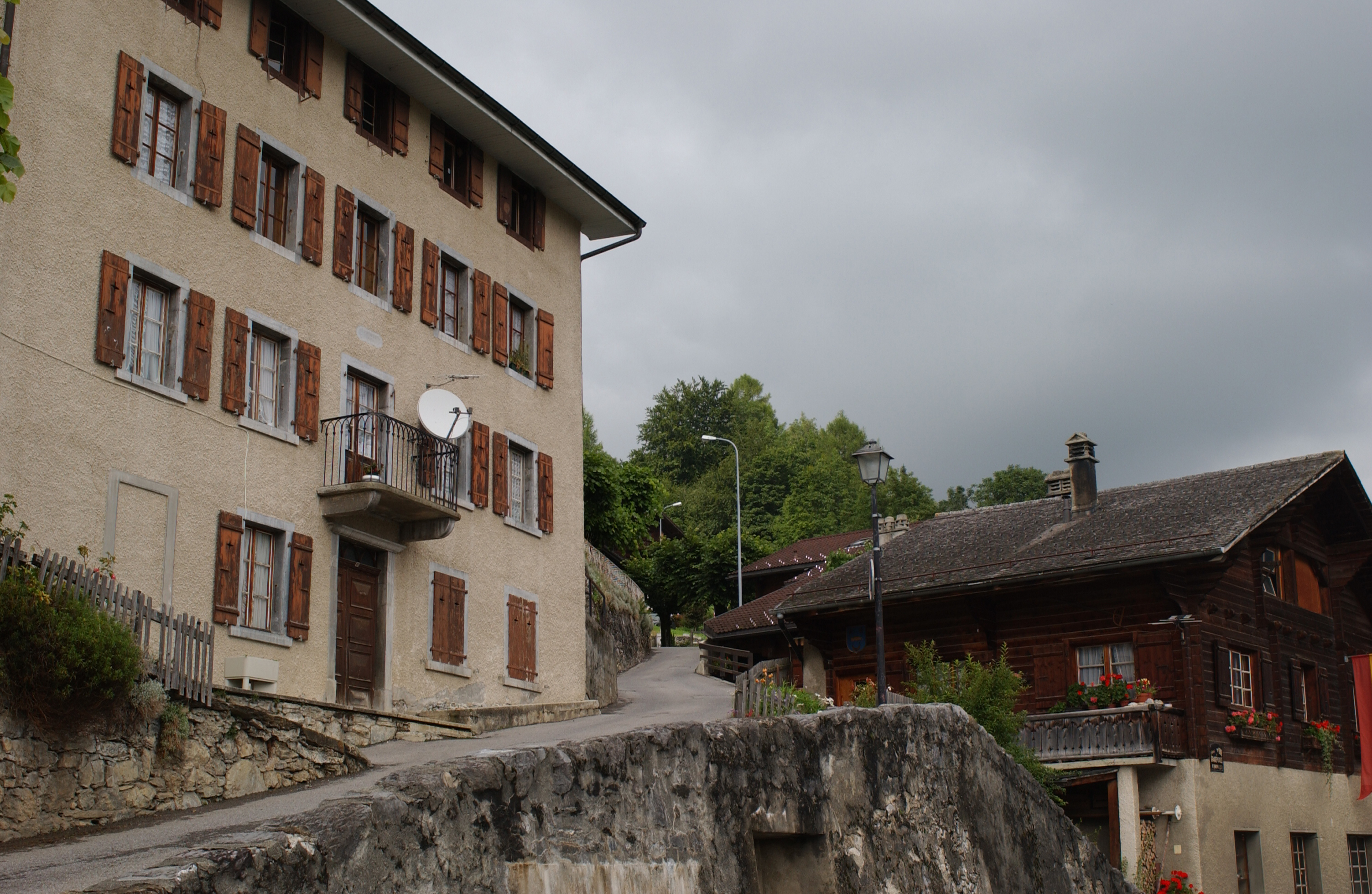
Houses in Gryon

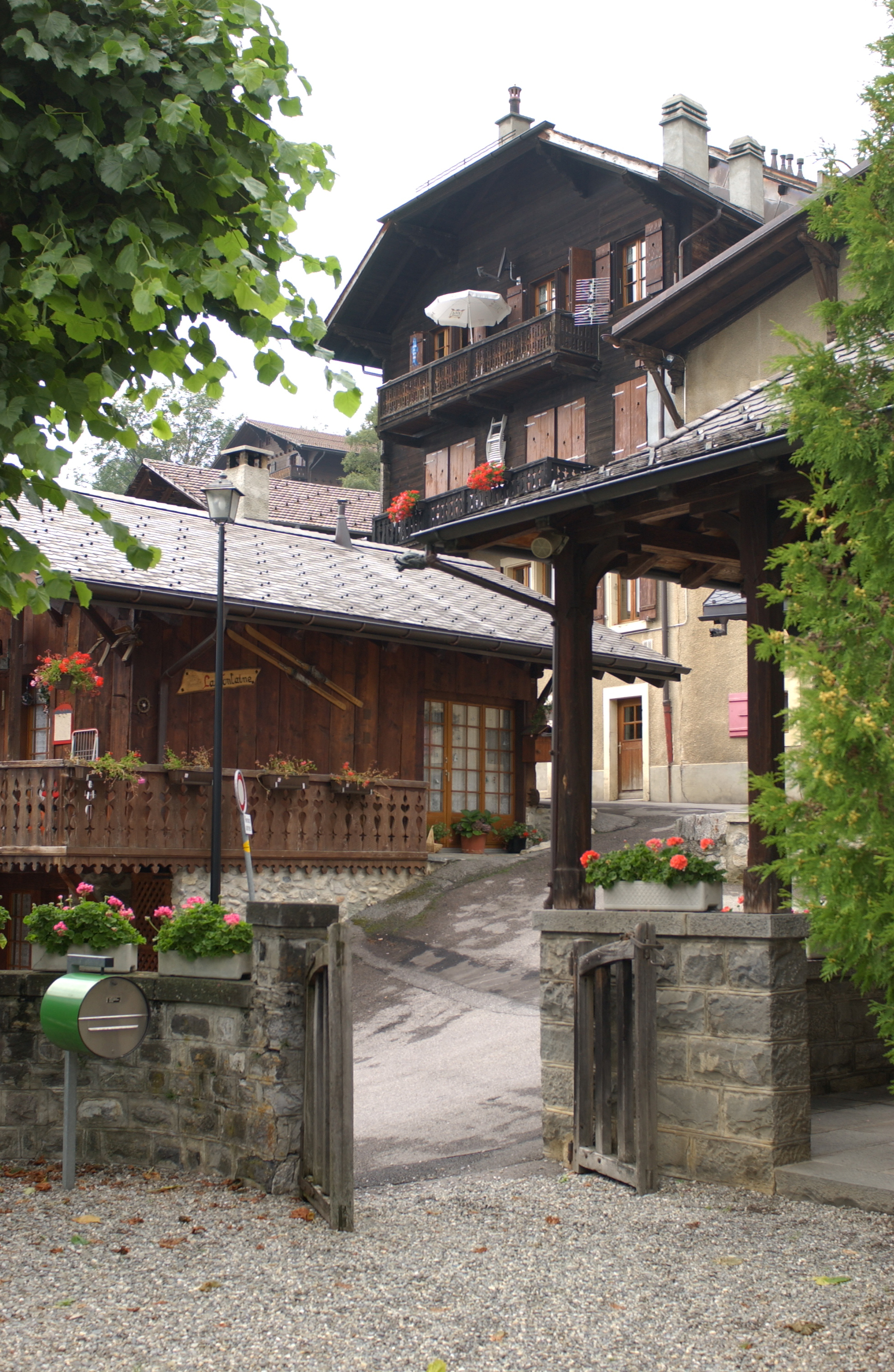
House in Gryon

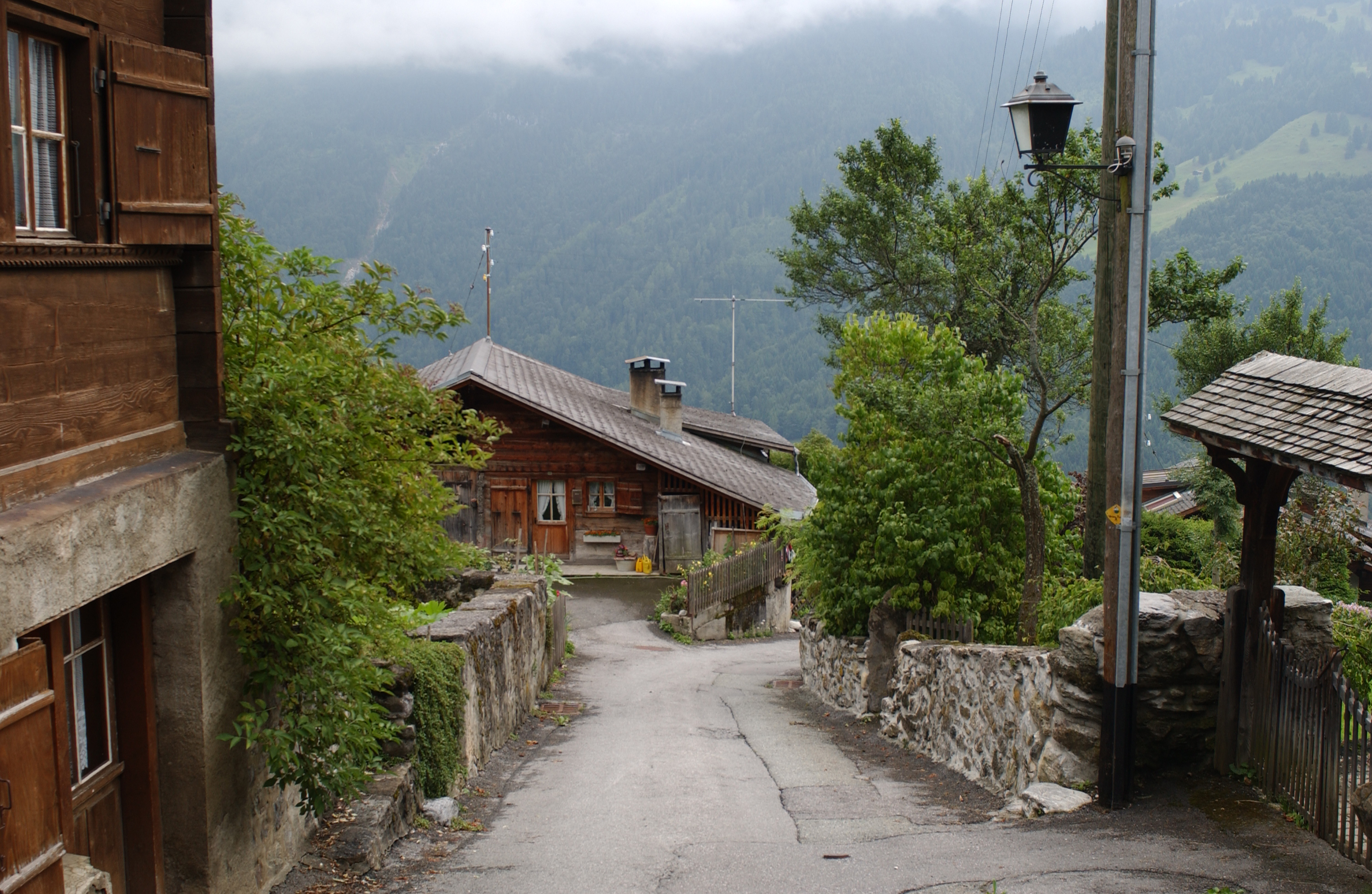
Gryon village

Gryon has a population (as of December 2020) of 1,376. As of 2019, 27.9% of the population are resident foreign nationals. Over the last 10 years (2009–2019) the population has changed at a rate of 13.3%.

Most of the population (as of 2000) speaks French (870 or 87.6%), with German being second most common (40 or 4.0%) and English being third (32 or 3.2%). There are 19 people who speak Italian.

Of the population in the municipality 280 or about 28.2% were born in Gryon and lived there in 2000. There were 310 or 31.2% who were born in the same canton, while 170 or 17.1% were born somewhere else in Switzerland, and 225 or 22.7% were born outside of Switzerland.

In 2008 there were 4 live births to Swiss citizens and 4 births to non-Swiss citizens, and in same time span there were 6 deaths of Swiss citizens. Ignoring immigration and emigration, the population of Swiss citizens decreased by 2 while the foreign population increased by 4. There were 2 Swiss men who emigrated from Switzerland and 5 Swiss women who immigrated back to Switzerland. At the same time, there were 9 non-Swiss men and 9 non-Swiss women who immigrated from another country to Switzerland. The total Swiss population change in 2008 (from all sources, including moves across municipal borders) was a decrease of 15 and the non-Swiss population increased by 30 people. This represents a population growth rate of 1.3%.

The age distribution, as of 2009, in Gryon is; 132 children or 11.2% of the population are between 0 and 9 years old and 117 teenagers or 9.9% are between 10 and 19. Of the adult population, 113 people or 9.6% of the population are between 20 and 29 years old. 167 people or 14.2% are between 30 and 39, 183 people or 15.5% are between 40 and 49, and 144 people or 12.2% are between 50 and 59. The senior population distribution is 178 people or 15.1% of the population are between 60 and 69 years old, 86 people or 7.3% are between 70 and 79, there are 49 people or 4.2% who are 80 and 89, and there are 11 people or 0.9% who are 90 and older.

As of 2000, there were 358 people who were single and never married in the municipality. There were 511 married individuals, 56 widows or widowers and 68 individuals who are divorced.

As of 2000, there were 459 private households in the municipality, and an average of 2.1 persons per household. There were 177 households that consist of only one person and 23 households with five or more people. Out of a total of 473 households that answered this question, 37.4% were households made up of just one person and there was 1 adult who lived with their parents. Of the rest of the households, there are 148 married couples without children, 113 married couples with children There were 14 single parents with a child or children. There were 6 households that were made up of unrelated people and 14 households that were made up of some sort of institution or another collective housing.

In 2000 there were 709 single family homes (or 72.1% of the total) out of a total of 983 inhabited buildings. There were 205 multi-family buildings (20.9%), along with 30 multi-purpose buildings that were mostly used for housing (3.1%) and 39 other use buildings (commercial or industrial) that also had some housing (4.0%). Of the single family homes 104 were built before 1919, while 42 were built between 1990 and 2000. The greatest number of single family homes (166) were built between 1961 and 1970. The most multi-family homes (52) were built between 1971 and 1980 and the next most (51) were built between 1981 and 1990.

In 2000 there were 1,765 apartments in the municipality. The most common apartment size was 3 rooms of which there were 439. There were 184 single room apartments and 384 apartments with five or more rooms. Of these apartments, a total of 449 apartments (25.4% of the total) were permanently occupied, while 1,231 apartments (69.7%) were seasonally occupied and 85 apartments (4.8%) were empty. As of 2009, the construction rate of new housing units was 11.8 new units per 1000 residents. The vacancy rate for the municipality, in 2010, was 2.01%.

The historical population is given in the following chart:

== Politics ==
In the 2007 federal election the most popular party was the SVP which received 23% of the vote. The next three most popular parties were the FDP (22.05%), the SP (15.46%) and the Green Party (12.76%). In the federal election, a total of 283 votes were cast, and the voter turnout was 41.0%.

== Economy ==
In 2018 the total number of full-time equivalent jobs was 403. There were 11 (2.7%) people employed in the primary economic sector and about 6 businesses involved in the same sector. 84 (20.8%) people were employed in the secondary sector working across 18 businesses. 308 (76.4%) people were employed in the tertiary sector, with 111 businesses in this sector. There were 475 residents of the municipality who were employed in some capacity, of which females made up 42.9% of the workforce. As of 2010, Gryon had an unemployment rate of 4.8%.

In 2000, there were 53 workers who commuted into the municipality and 256 workers who commuted away. The municipality is a net exporter of workers, with about 4.8 workers leaving the municipality for every one entering. Of the working population, 11.8% used public transportation to get to work, and 65.3% used a private car.

== Religion ==
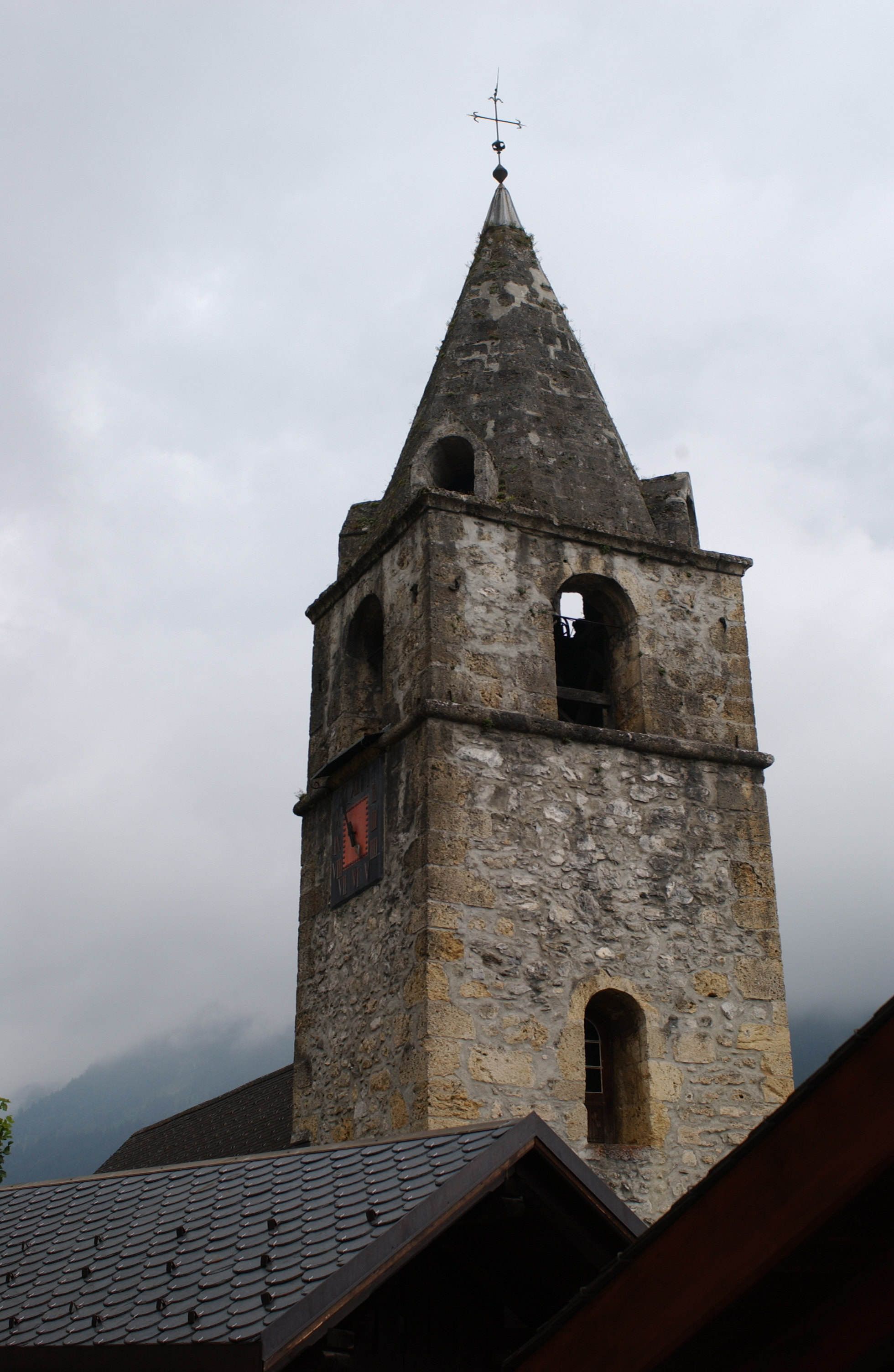
Tower of Gryon village church

From the 2000 census, 254 or 25.6% were Roman Catholic, while 524 or 52.8% belonged to the Swiss Reformed Church. Of the rest of the population, there were 9 members of an Orthodox church (or about 0.91% of the population), and there were 15 individuals (or about 1.51% of the population) who belonged to another Christian church. There were 12 (or about 1.21% of the population) who were Islamic. There were and 4 individuals who belonged to another church. 153 (or about 15.41% of the population) belonged to no church, are agnostic or atheist, and 22 individuals (or about 2.22% of the population) did not answer the question.

== Weather ==
Gryon has an average of 139.4 days of rain or snow per year and on average receives 1,367 mm (53.8 in) of precipitation. The wettest month is June during which time Gryon receives an average of 134 mm (5.3 in) of rain or snow. During this month there is precipitation for an average of 13.9 days. The month with the most days of precipitation is May, with an average of 13.9, but with only 120 mm (4.7 in) of rain or snow. The driest month of the year is October with an average of 94 mm (3.7 in) of precipitation over 9 days.

== Education ==
In Gryon about 387 or (39.0%) of the population have completed non-mandatory upper secondary education, and 160 or (16.1%) have completed additional higher education (either university or a Fachhochschule). Of the 160 who completed tertiary schooling, 42.5% were Swiss men, 25.6% were Swiss women, 16.9% were non-Swiss men and 15.0% were non-Swiss women.

In the 2009/2010 school year there were a total of 111 students in the Gryon school district. In the Vaud cantonal school system, two years of non-obligatory pre-school are provided by the political districts. During the school year, the district provided pre-school care for a total of 205 children of which 96 children (46.8%) received subsidized pre-school care. There were 70 students in the primary school program, which lasts four years. The obligatory lower secondary school program lasts for six years and there were 41 students in those schools.

As of 2000, there were 27 students in Gryon who came from another municipality, while 83 residents attended schools outside the municipality.
