= Saint-Triphon =

Coordinates: 46°17′42″N 6°58′32″E

Saint-Triphon is a village and a Swiss heritage site of national significance in the municipality of Ollon in the canton of Vaud in Switzerland. It was a prehistoric to medieval hilltop settlement.

== History ==
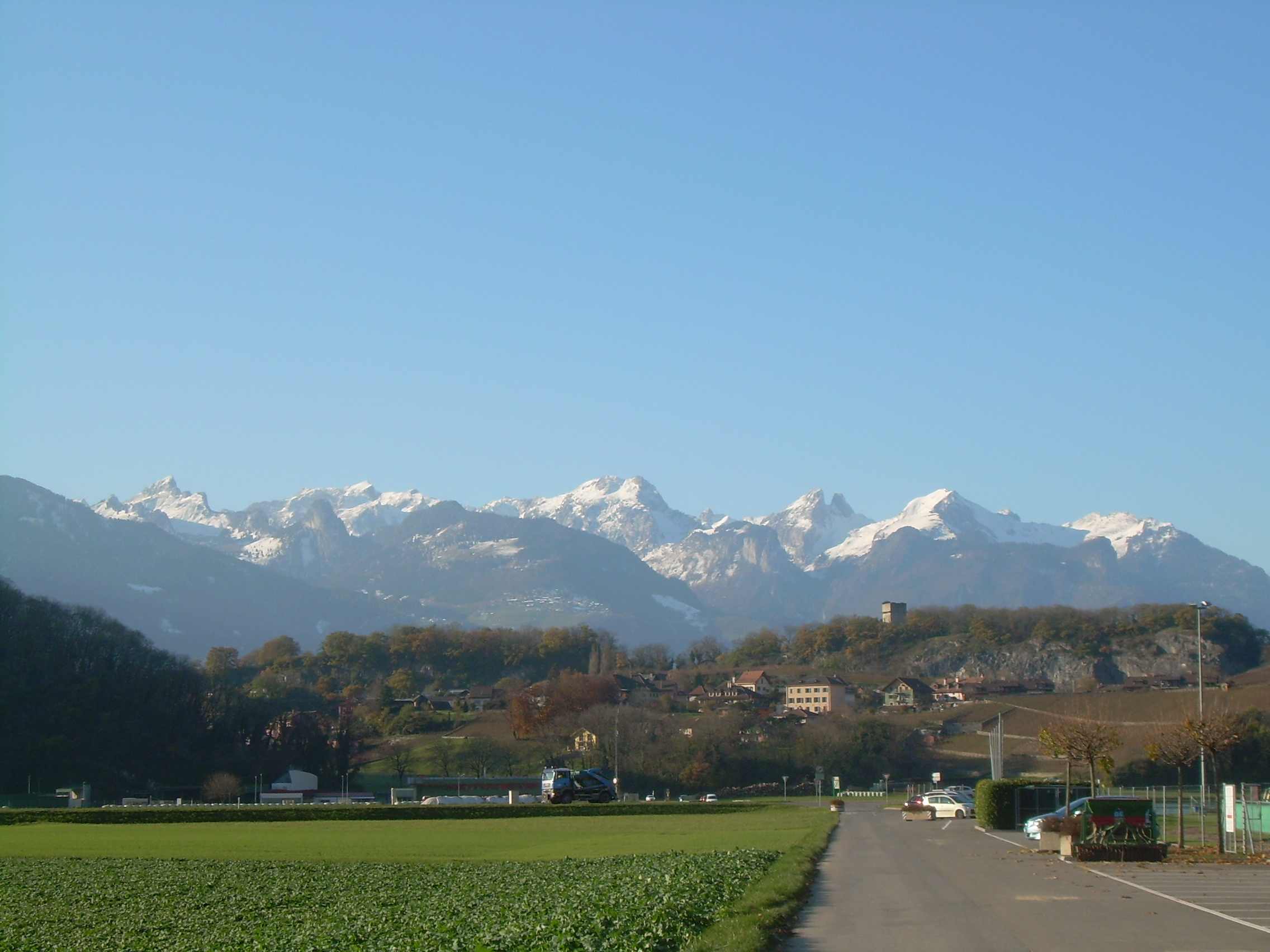
Looking east toward Saint Triphon village and the tower.

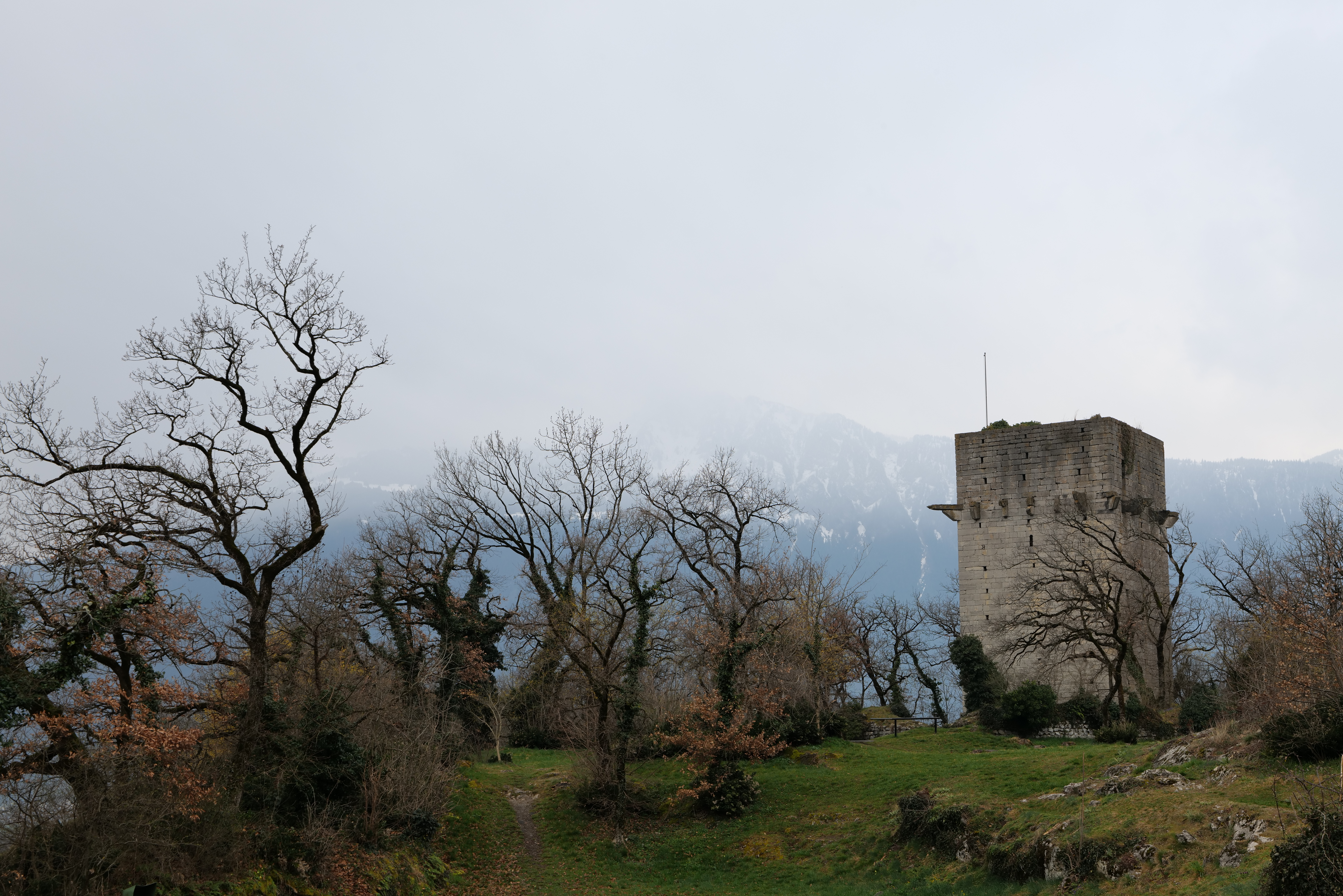
Impression of the St-Triphon tower photographed from the North East.

The village is situated on three hills overlooking the Rhone valley. It was first mentioned in 1332 as Triphonis Sancti. Archeological finds include items from the Middle Neolithic to the Roman era, including an Early Bronze Age necropolis and a Late Bronze Age smelter for copper processing.

On the hill Le Lessus stands a 18 m (59 ft) high square tower, probably from the 13th Century. The tower was partially destroyed in 1476. Foundations indicate that the tower was reached by a walkway. Nearby, the remains of a romanesque chapel from the 12th Century, the St Blaise Chapel, is still visible. In 1232 the Counts of Savoy granted the castle to Guy de Saillon. The fief was dismembered in the 14th Century and reunited in the 16th Century under the Rovéréa family. Between 1476-1798 it was one of the twelve Zenden des Mandements Ollon in the government of Aigle. The village was ruled by a Bernese mayor. Since the Middle Ages, black marble has been mined in the village.
