= Plan Saugey =

Coordinates: 46.26106°N 7.04382°E

Plan Saugey is a locality of the municipality of Bex, in Switzerland.
