= Ollon =

- Municipality
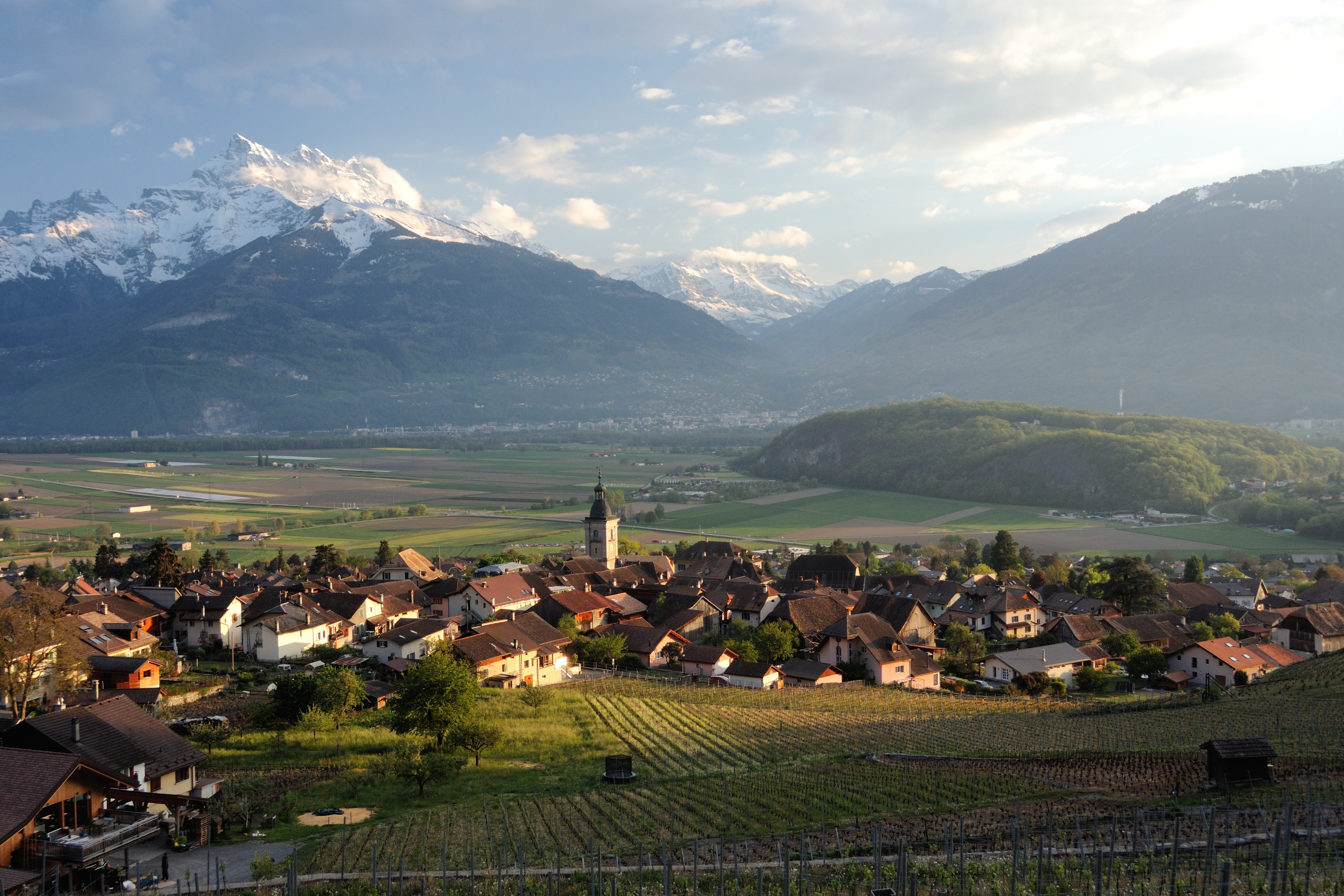
- Ollon village with vineyards in the foreground and the Dents du Midi in background

- Flag Coat of arms
- Location of Ollon
- Location within Switzerland Location within Canton of Vaud
- Coordinates: 46°18′N 7°00′E
- Country: Switzerland
- Canton: Vaud
- District: Aigle

Government
  - Mayor: Syndic; Patrick Turrian FDP/PRD/PLR (as of 2021–2026)

Area
  - Total: 59.54 km^{2} (22.99 sq mi)
- Elevation: 479 m (1,572 ft)

Population (2000)
  - Total: 6,307
  - Density: 105.9/km^{2} (274.4/sq mi)
- Time zone: UTC+01:00 (CET)
  - Summer (DST): UTC+02:00 (CEST)
- Postal code: 1867
- SFOS number: 5409
- ISO 3166 code: CH-VD
- Localities: Antagnes, Arveyes, Auliens, Bretaye, Chesières, Crettaz, Exergillod, Forchex, Glutières, Huémoz, Les Combes, Les Ecovets, Les Fontaines, Pallueyres, Panex, Plambuit, Plan d'Essert, Salaz, St-Triphon, Verschiez, Villars-sur-Ollon, Villy
- Surrounded by: Aigle, Bex, Collombey-Muraz (VS), Gryon, Monthey (VS), Ormont-Dessous, Ormont-Dessus
- Website: ollon.ch

Ollon is a municipality in the district of Aigle in the canton of Vaud in Switzerland, sited in the foothills of the mountains to the south-east of the Lake of Geneva. The old German language name Olun is no longer used.

== History ==
Ollon is first mentioned in 1018 as Aulonum though there is some debate about whether this refers to another settlement. In 1025-1032 it was mentioned as Olonum.

=== Saint-Triphon ===
The village of Saint-Triphon is situated on three hills overlooking the Rhone valley. It was first mentioned in 1332 as Triphonis Sancti. Archeological finds include items from the Middle Neolithic to the Roman era, including an Early Bronze Age necropolis and a Late Bronze Age smelter for copper processing.

On the hill Le Lessus stands a 18 m (59 ft) high square tower, probably from the 13th century. The tower was partially destroyed in 1476. Foundations indicate that the tower was reached by a walkway. Nearby, the remains of a romanesque chapel from the 12th century is still visible. In 1232 the Counts of Savoy granted the castle to Guy de Saillon. The fief was dismembered in the 14th century and reunited in the 16th century under the Rovéréa family. Between 1476 and 1798 it was one of the twelve Zenden des Mandements Ollon in the government of Aigle. The village was ruled by a Bernese mayor. Since the Middle Ages, black marble has been mined in the village.

== Geography ==
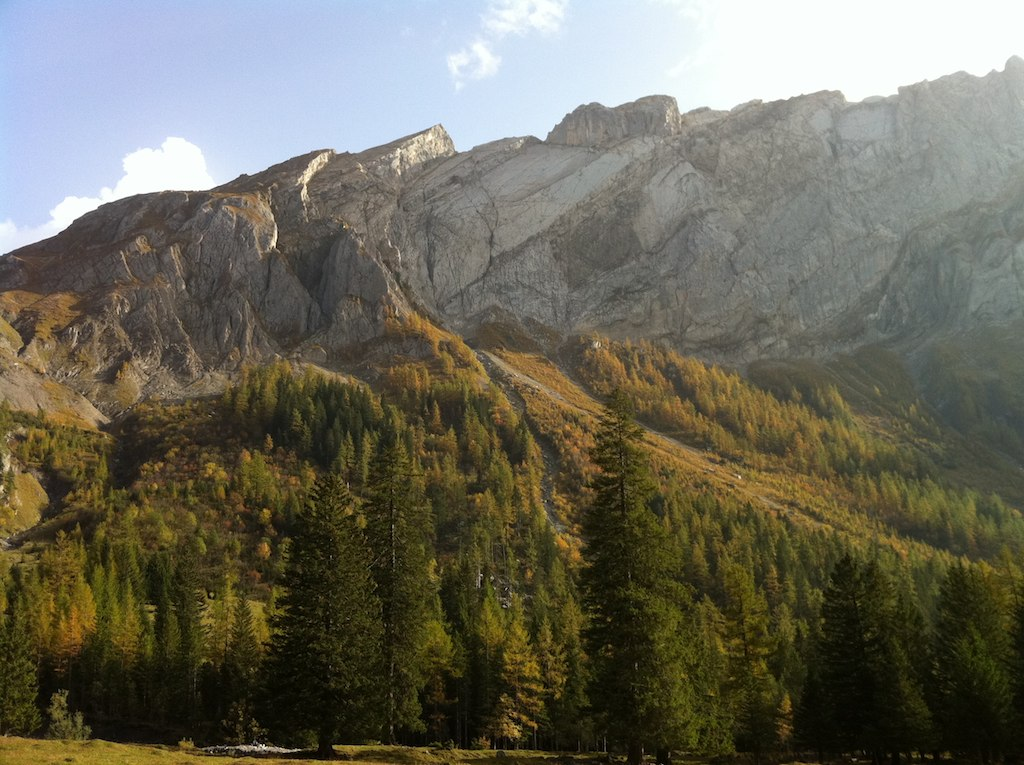
Mountains near Villar-sur-Ollon

Aerial view (1952)

Ollon has an area of 59.54 square kilometers (22.99 sq mi). Of this area, 23.86 km^{2} (9.21 sq mi) or 40.1% is used for agricultural purposes, while 27.11 km^{2} (10.47 sq mi) or 45.5% is forested. Of the rest of the land, 6.3 km^{2} (2.4 sq mi) or 10.6% is settled (buildings or roads), 0.55 km^{2} (0.21 sq mi) or 0.9% is either rivers or lakes and 1.68 km^{2} (0.65 sq mi) or 2.8% is unproductive land.

Of the built up area, housing and buildings made up 5.6% and transportation infrastructure made up 3.1%. Out of the forested land, 38.9% of the total land area is heavily forested and 4.8% is covered with orchards or small clusters of trees. Of the agricultural land, 11.1% is used for growing crops and 8.5% is pastures, while 2.9% is used for orchards or vine crops and 17.7% is used for alpine pastures. Of the water in the municipality, 0.3% is in lakes and 0.6% is in rivers and streams.

The municipality is located in the Aigle district. The area covered by Ollon borders the Rhône on the southwest side, and rises up the mountainside as far as Chamossaire. Ollon includes 123 hectares (300 acres) of vineyards. It is one of the largest municipalities in the canton. It consists of the village of Ollon and 23 other villages and hamlets (including; Antagnes, Arveyes, Chesières, Huémoz, Panex, Saint-Triphon, Villars-sur-Ollon) as well as scattered summer grazing camps (Bretaye, Les Closalets, La Barboleusaz).

== Coat of arms ==
The blazon of the municipal coat of arms is Quartered Vert and Gules, overall a Cross couped Argent.

== Demographics ==
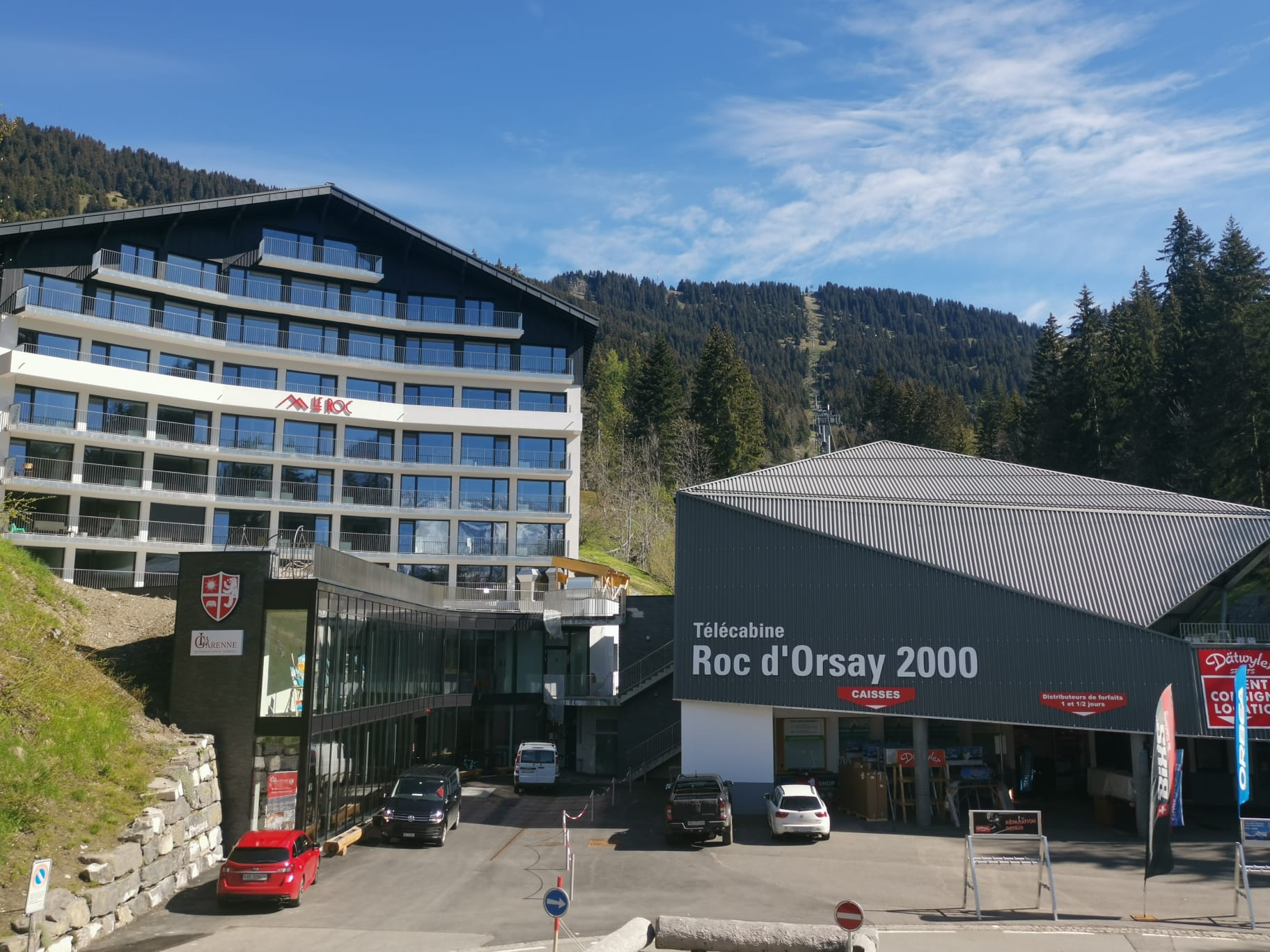
Roc d'Orsay gondola

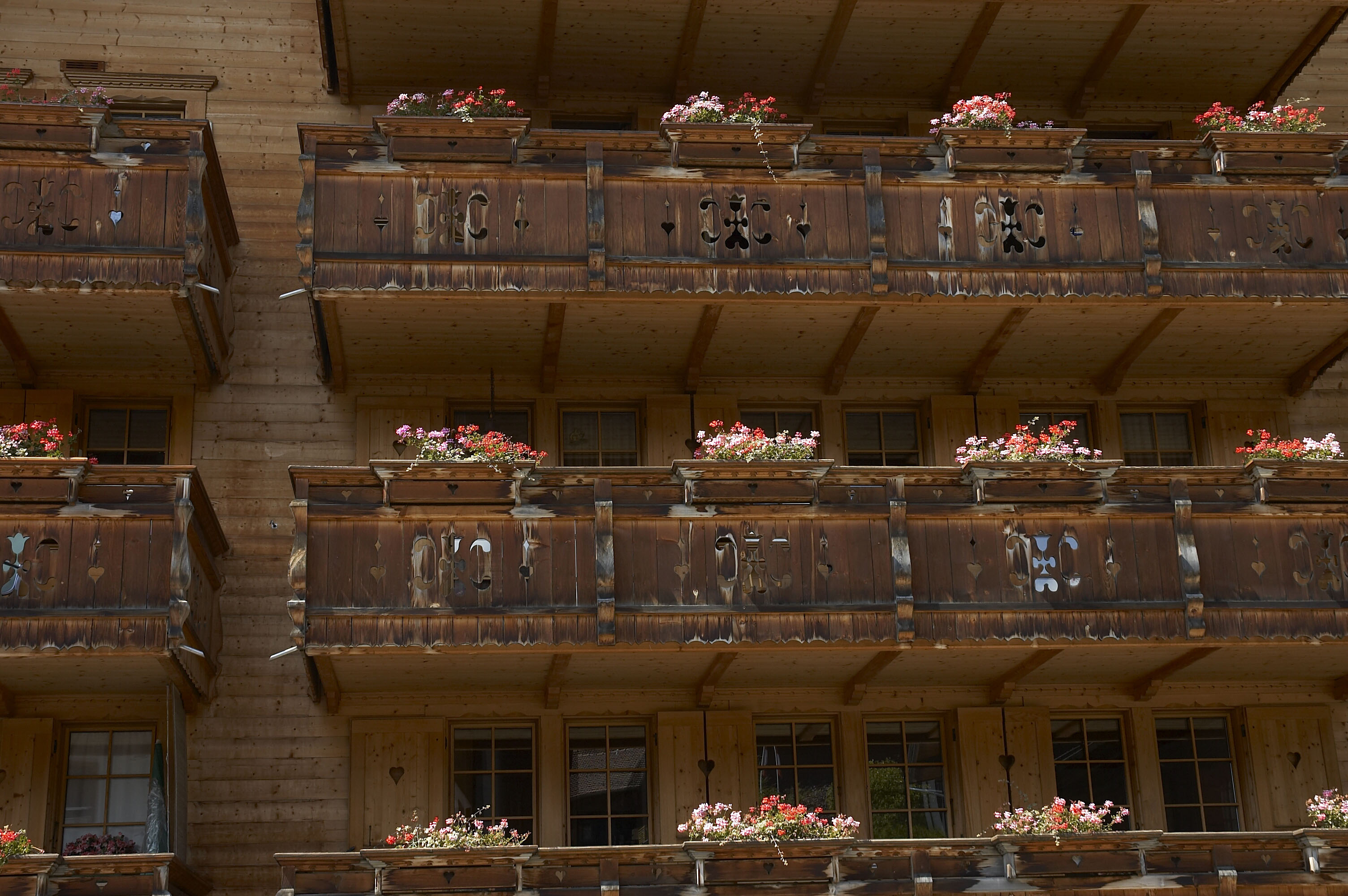
balconies in Villars-sur-Ollon

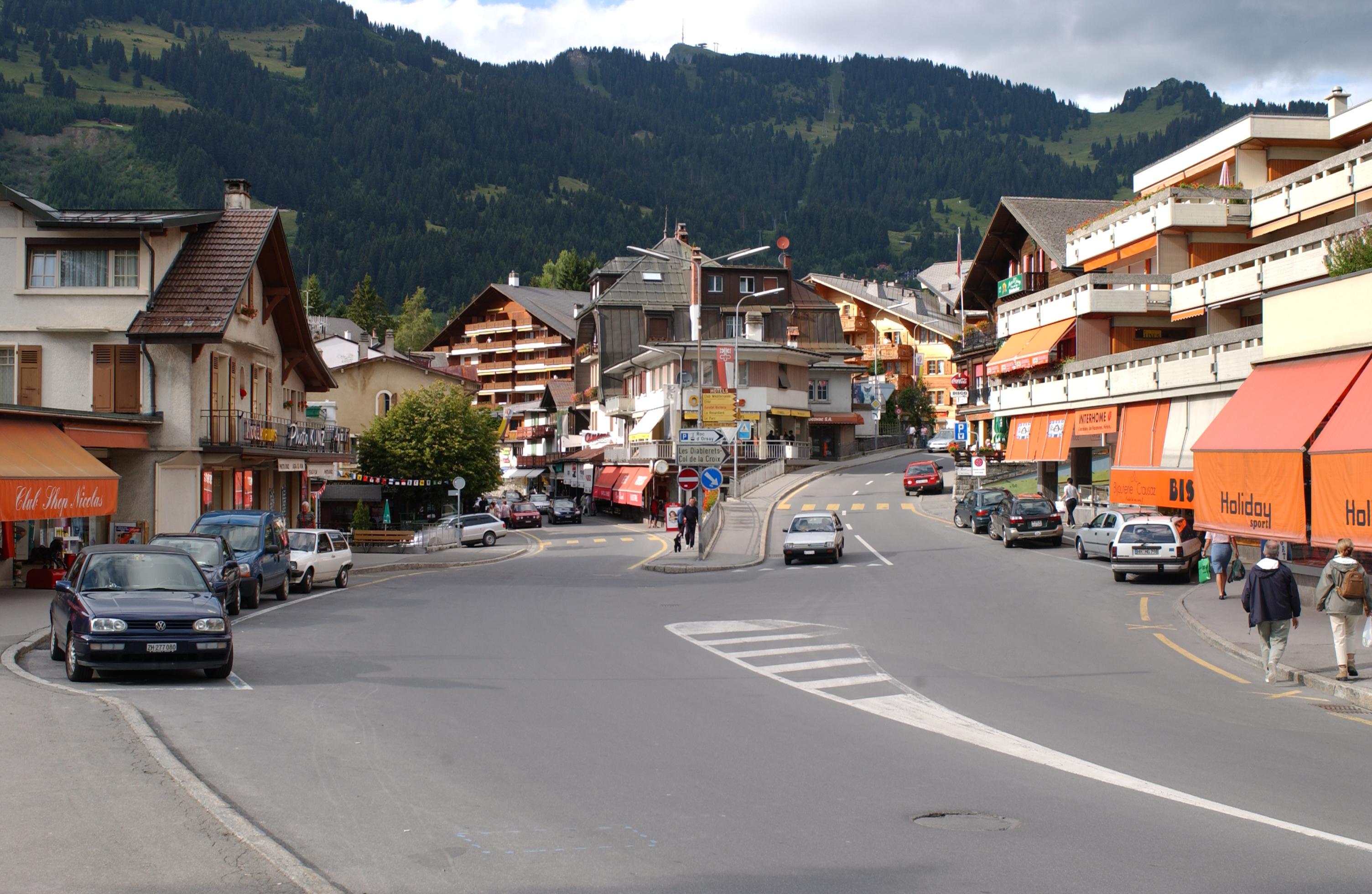
Villars-sur-Ollon

Ollon has a population (as of December 2020) of 7,624. As of 2008, 32.7% of the population are resident foreign nationals. Over the last 10 years (1999–2009) the population has changed at a rate of 11.7%. It has changed at a rate of 10.7% due to migration and at a rate of 1.2% due to births and deaths.

Most of the population (as of 2000) speaks French (4,955 or 79.2%), with English being second most common (335 or 5.4%) and German being third (246 or 3.9%). There are 96 people who speak Italian and 3 people who speak Romansh.

Of the population in the municipality 1,724 or about 27.6% were born in Ollon and lived there in 2000. There were 1,374 or 22.0% who were born in the same canton, while 1,011 or 16.2% were born somewhere else in Switzerland, and 1,869 or 29.9% were born outside of Switzerland.

In 2008 there were 38 live births to Swiss citizens and 15 births to non-Swiss citizens, and in same time span there were 45 deaths of Swiss citizens and 5 non-Swiss citizen deaths. Ignoring immigration and emigration, the population of Swiss citizens decreased by 7 while the foreign population increased by 10. There was 1 Swiss man and 1 Swiss woman who emigrated from Switzerland. At the same time, there were 81 non-Swiss men and 107 non-Swiss women who immigrated from another country to Switzerland. The total Swiss population change in 2008 (from all sources, including moves across municipal borders) was an increase of 91 and the non-Swiss population increased by 95 people. This represents a population growth rate of 2.8%.

The age distribution, as of 2009, in Ollon is; 690 children or 9.9% of the population are between 0 and 9 years old and 1,368 teenagers or 19.7% are between 10 and 19. Of the adult population, 622 people or 9.0% of the population are between 20 and 29 years old. 772 people or 11.1% are between 30 and 39, 1,142 people or 16.4% are between 40 and 49, and 900 people or 13.0% are between 50 and 59. The senior population distribution is 750 people or 10.8% of the population are between 60 and 69 years old, 437 people or 6.3% are between 70 and 79, there are 246 people or 3.5% who are 80 and 89, and there are 22 people or 0.3% who are 90 and older.

As of 2000, there were 2,723 people who were single and never married in the municipality. There were 2,915 married individuals, 318 widows or widowers and 301 individuals who are divorced.

As of 2000, there were 2,399 private households in the municipality, and an average of 2.3 persons per household. There were 839 households that consist of only one person and 151 households with five or more people. Out of a total of 2,519 households that answered this question, 33.3% were households made up of just one person and there were 15 adults who lived with their parents. Of the rest of the households, there are 627 married couples without children, 726 married couples with children. There were 158 single parents with a child or children. There were 34 households that were made up of unrelated people and 120 households that were made up of some sort of institution or another collective housing.

In 2000 there were 5,227 apartments in the municipality. The most common apartment size was 3 rooms of which there were 1,523. There were 486 single room apartments and 1,154 apartments with five or more rooms. Of these apartments, a total of 2,130 apartments (40.7% of the total) were permanently occupied, while 2,880 apartments (55.1%) were seasonally occupied and 217 apartments (4.2%) were empty. As of 2009, the construction rate of new housing units was 2 new units per 1000 residents. The vacancy rate for the municipality, in 2010, was 1.33%.

The historical population is given in the following chart:

== Heritage sites of national significance ==
The Saint-Triphon Et Charpigny, a prehistoric to medieval hilltop settlement, is listed as a Swiss heritage site of national significance. The entire villages of Huémoz and Ollon are part of the Inventory of Swiss Heritage Sites.

== Politics ==
In the 2023 federal election the most popular party was the FDP with 27.0% of the vote, followed by the SVP with 19.4% of the vote, and the SP with 21.2% of the vote.

== Economy ==
As of April 2025, Ollon had an unemployment rate of 3.1%.

The Villars-Chesières area is a home to four international boarding schools, which represent a significant sector of the local economy. Radio Télévision Suisse reported in 2019 that these schools generate approximately CHF 30 million in annual revenue for the resort, employing 463 people and hosting around 700 boarding students.

In 2008 the total number of full-time equivalent jobs was 1,777. The number of jobs in the primary sector was 139, of which 124 were in agriculture and 15 were in forestry or lumber production. The number of jobs in the secondary sector was 269 of which 78 or (29.0%) were in manufacturing and 168 (62.5%) were in construction. The number of jobs in the tertiary sector was 1,369. In the tertiary sector; 224 or 16.4% were in wholesale or retail sales or the repair of motor vehicles, 110 or 8.0% were in the movement and storage of goods, 355 or 25.9% were in a hotel or restaurant, 5 or 0.4% were in the information industry, 28 or 2.0% were the insurance or financial industry, 66 or 4.8% were technical professionals or scientists, 387 or 28.3% were in education and 8 or 0.6% were in health care.

In 2000, there were 499 workers who commuted into the municipality and 1,334 workers who commuted away. The municipality is a net exporter of workers, with about 2.7 workers leaving the municipality for every one entering. About 2.0% of the workforce coming into Ollon are coming from outside Switzerland, while 0.1% of the locals commute out of Switzerland for work. Of the working population, 10.5% used public transportation to get to work, and 59.5% used a private car.

== Religion ==
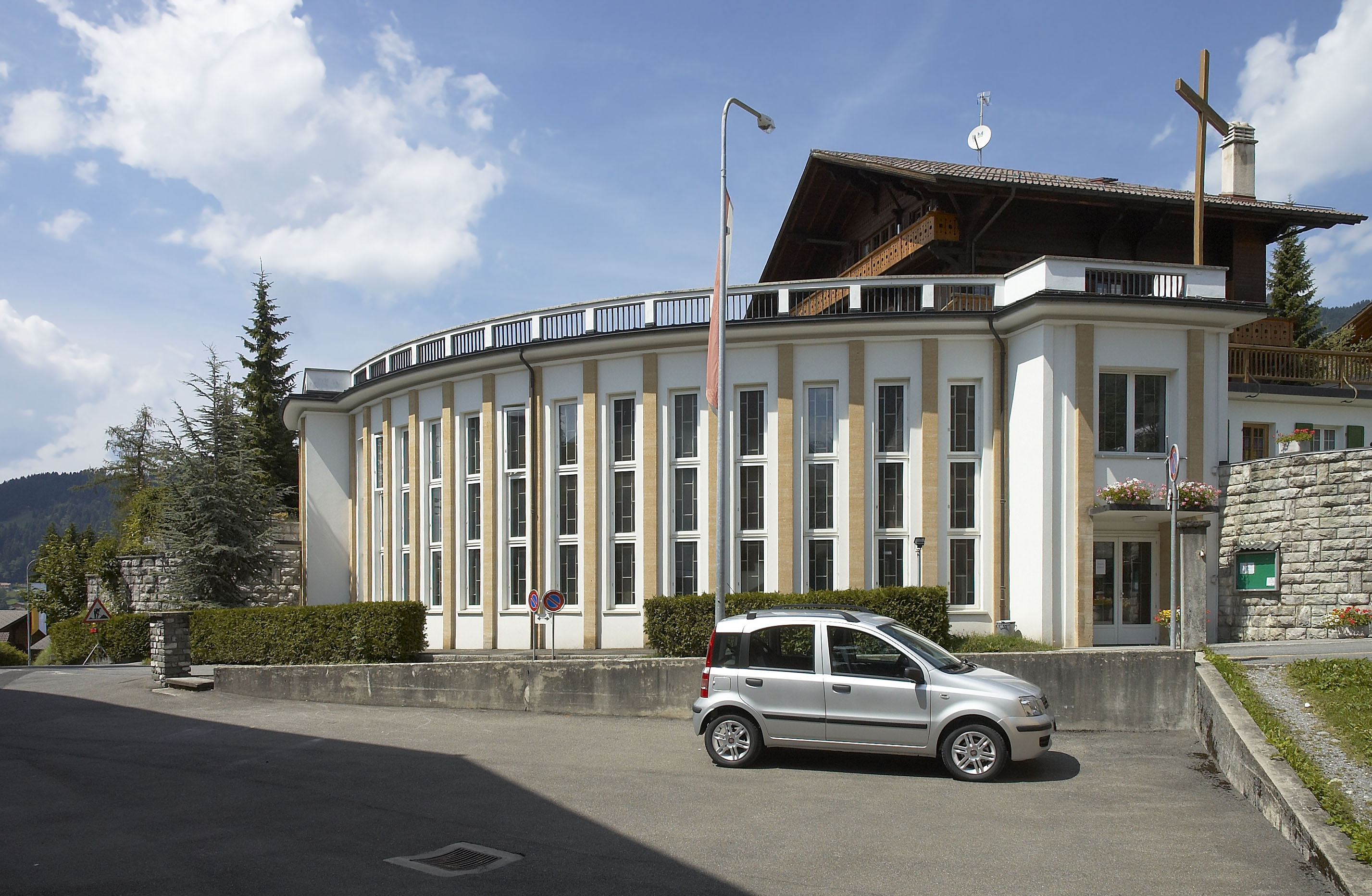
Catholic Church of Villars-sur-Ollon

From the 2000 census, 1,922 or 30.7% were Roman Catholic, while 2,603 or 41.6% belonged to the Swiss Reformed Church. Of the rest of the population, there were 128 members of an Orthodox church (or about 2.05% of the population), there were 3 individuals (or about 0.05% of the population) who belonged to the Christian Catholic Church, and there were 167 individuals (or about 2.67% of the population) who belonged to another Christian church. There were 14 individuals (or about 0.22% of the population) who were Jewish, and 175 (or about 2.80% of the population) who were Islamic. There were 11 individuals who were Buddhist, 14 individuals who were Hindu and 8 individuals who belonged to another church. 732 (or about 11.70% of the population) belonged to no church, are agnostic or atheist, and 480 individuals (or about 7.67% of the population) did not answer the question.

== Education ==
In Ollon about 1,975 or (31.6%) of the population have completed non-mandatory upper secondary education, and 885 or (14.1%) have completed additional higher education (either university or a Fachhochschule). Of the 885 who completed tertiary schooling, 44.2% were Swiss men, 23.2% were Swiss women, 18.0% were non-Swiss men and 14.7% were non-Swiss women.

In the 2009/2010 school year there were a total of 789 students in the Ollon school district. In the Vaud cantonal school system, two years of non-obligatory pre-school are provided by the political districts. During the school year, the political district provided pre-school care for a total of 205 children of which 96 children (46.8%) received subsidized pre-school care. The canton's primary school program requires students to attend for four years. There were 402 students in the municipal primary school program. The obligatory lower secondary school program lasts for six years and there were 386 students in those schools. There were also 1 students who were home schooled or attended another non-traditional school.

As of 2000, there were 46 students in Ollon who came from another municipality, while 346 residents attended schools outside the municipality.

The locality of Chesières is home to several international boarding schools that have been operating since the late 1940s: La Garenne International School (founded 1947), Aiglon College (founded 1949), and Collège Alpin International Beau Soleil. The schools are officially recognised under cantonal private school legislation.
