= Marie-Louise Dreier =

- Born: 3 October 1936 (age 89); Brussels, Belgium
- Occupation: poet

Marie-Louise Dreier (born 3 October 1936) in Brussels is a poet living in Bex in the canton of Vaud, Switzerland.

Dreier spent her childhood in Andenne. On the advice of her parents, she studied to become a secretary and then she took art studies at the Ecole Normale of the University of Quebec where she decided to become a French teacher. She has written several books of poems and has received distinctions. Dreier is a member of the Association vaudoise des écrivains (Vaud writers association) and the Association des écrivaines et écrivains suisses (Swiss writers association) and of the Olten Group.

== Awards ==
She received the Paul Budry Prize in 1977, the prize of the town of Montpellier (France), the gold medal of the Lutèce Academy in 1978, the golden medal of the town of Paris in 1979, the classical prize for the integral part of her works (Canada 1982) and the prize of honor for foreign poets by the Copenhagen Faculty of literature.

== Bibliography ==
- Aux vagues du jour, Éditions Eliane Vernay, Genève, 1977
- Avant qu`il ne fût jour, Éditions Eliane Vernay, Genève, 1978
- Spirales, Ed. Vieille Presse, Neuchâtel, 1981
- Plain-Chant, Ed. Randin, Aigle, 1984
- Garance, L`Aire, Lausanne, 1988
- Moissons, Ed. R. Layaz, 2002
