= St Blaise Chapel =

Coordinates: 46.29572°N 6.97743°E

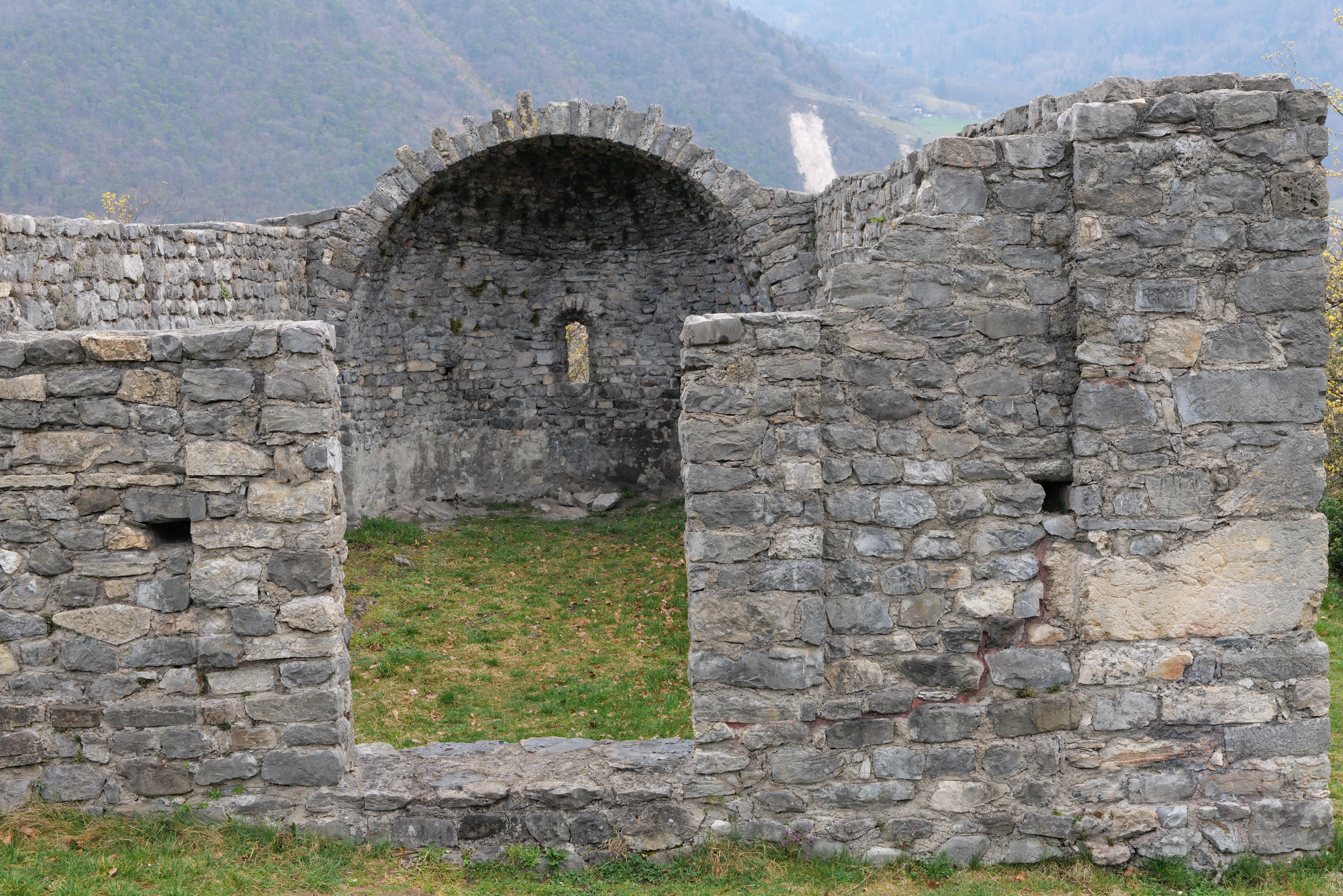
Roman arch of the St Blaise Chapel

The Saint Blaise Chapel is an historic ruin located in the hamlet of Saint-Triphon in Switzerland. This romanesque style chapel, which existed still at least 1174, was partially restored in 2009.
