= Bex =

- Municipality
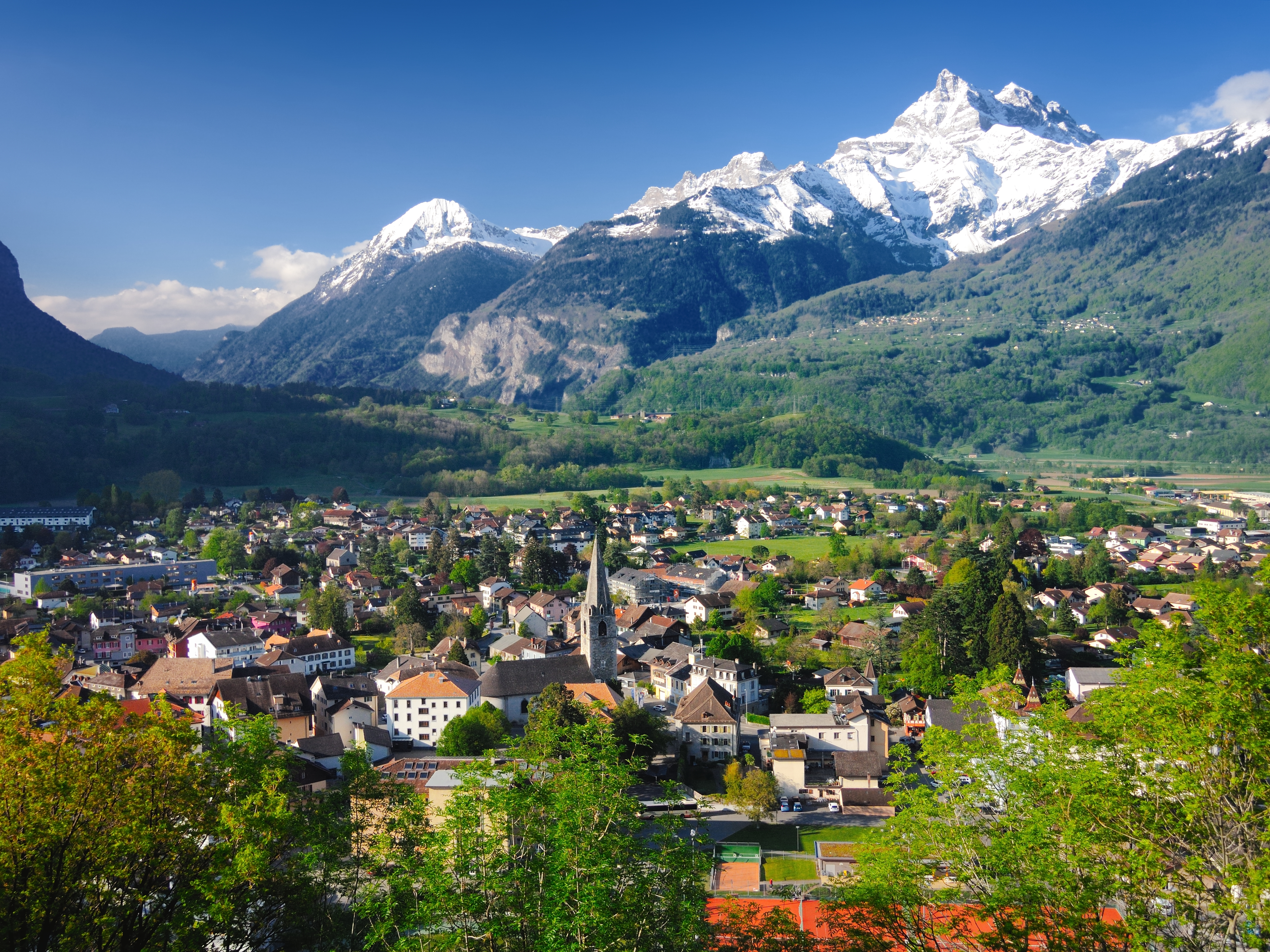
- Bex and the Dents du Midi across the Rhone valley

- Flag Coat of arms
- Location of Bex
- Location within Switzerland Location within Canton of Vaud
- Coordinates: 46°15′N 7°1′E
- Country: Switzerland
- Canton: Vaud
- District: Aigle

Government
  - Mayor: Syndic; Pierre Rochat

Area
  - Total: 96.56 km^{2} (37.28 sq mi)
- Elevation: 424 m (1,391 ft)

Population (2003)
  - Total: 5,751
  - Density: 59.56/km^{2} (154.3/sq mi)
- Time zone: UTC+01:00 (CET)
  - Summer (DST): UTC+02:00 (CEST)
- Postal code: 1880
- SFOS number: 5402
- ISO 3166 code: CH-VD
- Surrounded by: Chamoson (VS), Collonges (VS), Conthey (VS), Fully (VS), Gryon, Lavey-Morcles, Leytron (VS), Massongex (VS), Monthey (VS), Ollon, Ormont-Dessus, Saint-Maurice (VS)
- Twin towns: Tuttlingen (Germany)
- Website: www.bex.ch

Bex (French: [be]; German: Beis; Arpitan: Bés) is a municipality in the canton of Vaud, Switzerland, located in the district of Aigle. It is a few kilometers south of its sister town municipality of Aigle.

== History ==
Bex is first mentioned in 574 as in Baccis.

=== Salt mine ===
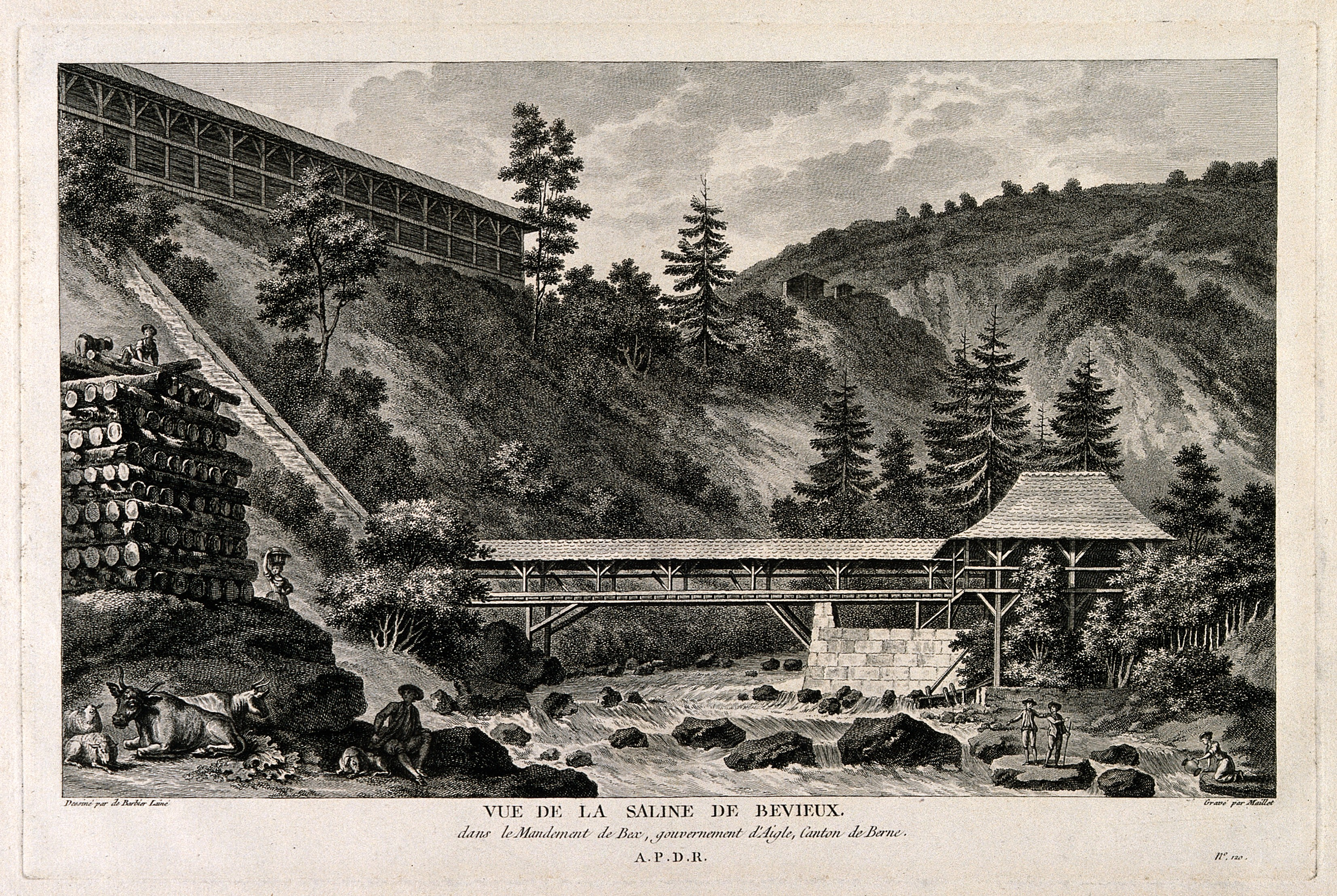
Bévieux salt mine

Bex is the site of a famous salt mine.

The salt deposits in Bex were the first ones discovered in Switzerland. In the 15th century, a salt source is mentioned in the area, but it was not until 1554 that a large deposit was discovered in Panex. Production of the salt began shortly thereafter. In 1582 a salt works was built in Roche. Initially the salt works were run by Bernese patricians, and then foreign nobles. In 1685 the salt mines came under the direct control of the Bernese state. At the beginning of the 18th century, it was entrusted to a general director, the most famous one being Albrecht von Haller.

To provide wood for the salt works in Roche, in 1695 a forest was planted in the Joux Verte gorge. Starting in the 16th century, natural evaporation was replaced by boiling to speed up salt production. The first tunnels were dug in 1684 to find new salt sources. Salt deposits were discovered in Le Bévieux and Les Devens (both part of the municipality of Bex) and Aigle. The mine at Le Bévieux was still in operation at the beginning of the 21st century.

== Geography ==
Aerial view (1952)

Bex has an area, as of 2009, of 96.56 square kilometers (37.28 sq mi). Of this area, 25.85 km^{2} (9.98 sq mi) or 26.8% is used for agricultural purposes, while 32.42 km^{2} (12.52 sq mi) or 33.6% is forested. Of the rest of the land, 4.48 km^{2} (1.73 sq mi) or 4.6% is settled (buildings or roads), 0.84 km^{2} (0.32 sq mi) or 0.9% is either rivers or lakes and 33.01 km^{2} (12.75 sq mi) or 34.2% is unproductive land.

Of the built up area, housing and buildings made up 2.0% and transportation infrastructure made up 1.6%. Out of the forested land, 28.1% of the total land area is heavily forested and 2.6% is covered with orchards or small clusters of trees. Of the agricultural land, 4.3% is used for growing crops and 5.8% is pastures, while 2.0% is used for orchards or vine crops and 14.7% is used for alpine pastures. All the water in the municipality is flowing water. Of the unproductive areas, 9.4% is unproductive vegetation, 23.1% is too rocky for vegetation and 1.7% of the land is covered by glaciers.

Bex sits on the east side of the Rhone River in a wide valley surrounded on the east by the Pays d'en Haut and the Bernese Alps and on the west by the Chablais Alps. The municipality is located in the Aigle district, along the Avançon river. It stretches from the banks of the Rhone (395 m (1,296 ft)) to the Alps. It includes most of the highest mountains of the canton: Les Diablerets peak (3,210 m (10,530 ft)), Grand Muveran, Dent Favre and Dent de Morcles. The municipality consists of the town of Bex and the hamlets of Le Châtel, Les Dévens, Le Chêne, Fenalet, Les Posses, Le Bévieux, Frenières and Les Plans-sur-Bex.

Famous ski resorts are nearby, notably Villars-sur-Ollon and Gryon, a few kilometres above the town. Bex is also connected to Les Diablerets by the mountain pass Col de la Croix.

== Coat of arms ==
The blazon of the municipal coat of arms is Azure, a ram Argent rampant, in chief dexter a mullet of eight Or.

== Demographics ==
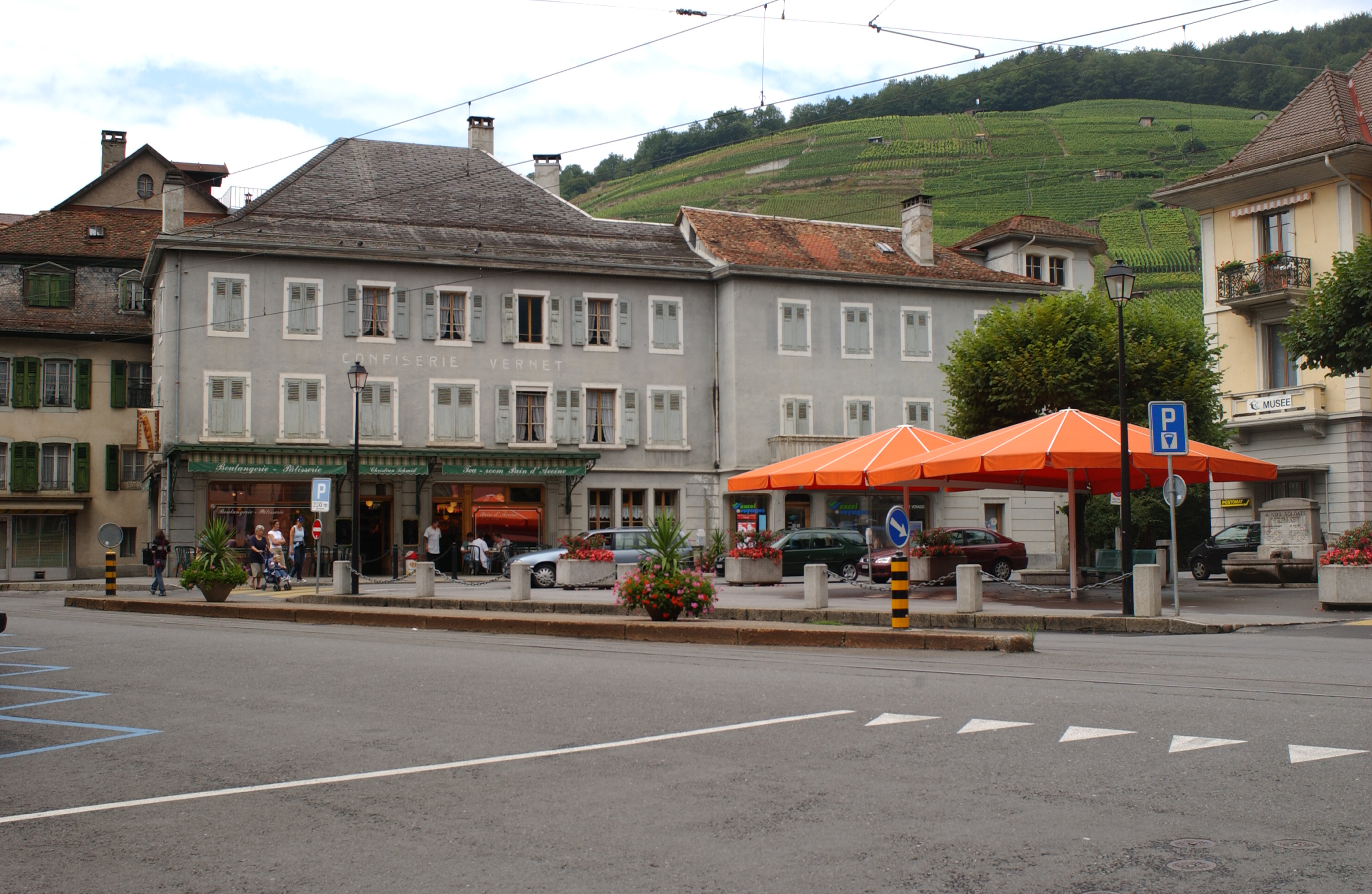
Place du Marché. Note the vineyards in background

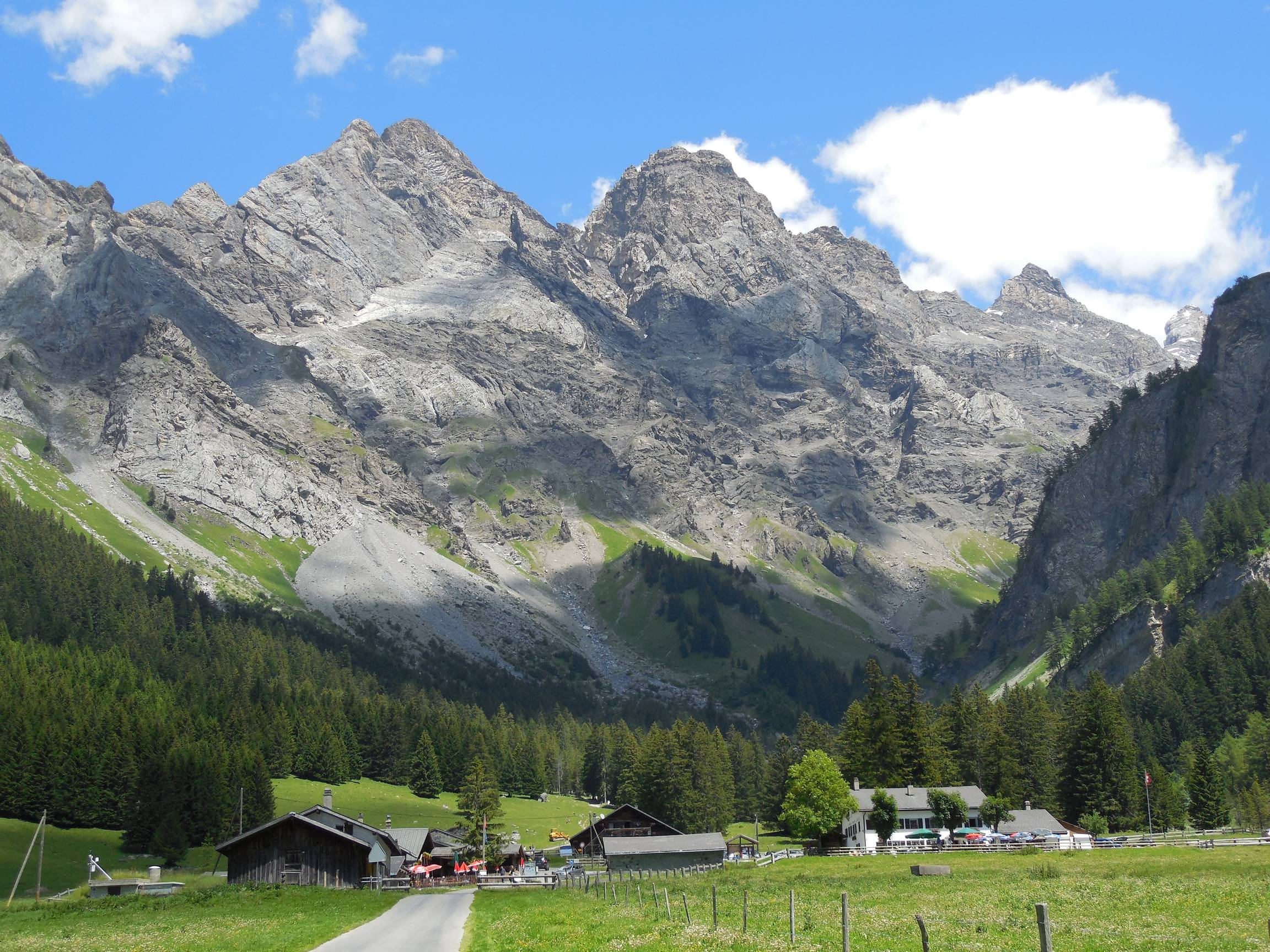
Solalex alpine pastures dominated by the Diablerets

Bex has a population (as of December 2020) of 7,845. As of 2008, 26.3% of the population are resident foreign nationals. Over the last 10 years (1999–2009 ) the population has changed at a rate of 12.8%. It has changed at a rate of 13.7% due to migration and at a rate of 0.5% due to births and deaths.

Most of the population (as of 2000) speaks French (5,008 or 83.8%), with Albanian being second most common (232 or 3.9%) and German being third (203 or 3.4%). There are 149 people who speak Italian and 2 people who speak Romansh.

Of the population in the municipality 1,937 or about 32.4% were born in Bex and lived there in 2000. There were 1,187 or 19.9% who were born in the same canton, while 1,063 or 17.8% were born somewhere else in Switzerland, and 1,414 or 23.7% were born outside of Switzerland.

In 2008 there were 46 live births to Swiss citizens and 18 births to non-Swiss citizens, and in same time span there were 54 deaths of Swiss citizens and 5 non-Swiss citizen deaths. Ignoring immigration and emigration, the population of Swiss citizens decreased by 8 while the foreign population increased by 13. There were 5 Swiss men and 1 Swiss woman who immigrated back to Switzerland. At the same time, there were 70 non-Swiss men and 65 non-Swiss women who immigrated from another country to Switzerland. The total Swiss population change in 2008 (from all sources, including moves across municipal borders) was an increase of 92 and the non-Swiss population increased by 43 people. This represents a population growth rate of 2.2%.

The age distribution, as of 2009, in Bex is; 646 children or 10.3% of the population are between 0 and 9 years old and 810 teenagers or 12.9% are between 10 and 19. Of the adult population, 713 people or 11.4% of the population are between 20 and 29 years old. 731 people or 11.7% are between 30 and 39, 1,000 people or 16.0% are between 40 and 49, and 815 people or 13.0% are between 50 and 59. The senior population distribution is 710 people or 11.3% of the population are between 60 and 69 years old, 534 people or 8.5% are between 70 and 79, there are 249 people or 4.0% who are 80 and 89, and there are 59 people or 0.9% who are 90 and older.

As of 2000, there were 2,346 people who were single and never married in the municipality. There were 2,868 married individuals, 409 widows or widowers and 350 individuals who are divorced.

As of 2000, there were 2,403 private households in the municipality, and an average of 2.3 persons per household. There were 820 households that consist of only one person and 177 households with five or more people. Out of a total of 2,468 households that answered this question, 33.2% were households made up of just one person and there were 14 adults who lived with their parents. Of the rest of the households, there are 678 married couples without children, 721 married couples with children There were 137 single parents with a child or children. There were 33 households that were made up of unrelated people and 65 households that were made up of some sort of institution or another collective housing.

In 2000 there were 1,062 single family homes (or 59.5% of the total) out of a total of 1,785 inhabited buildings. There were 372 multi-family buildings (20.8%), along with 208 multi-purpose buildings that were mostly used for housing (11.7%) and 143 other use buildings (commercial or industrial) that also had some housing (8.0%). Of the single family homes 303 were built before 1919, while 93 were built between 1990 and 2000. The most multi-family homes (173) were built before 1919 and the next most (44) were built between 1919 and 1945. There were 6 multi-family houses built between 1996 and 2000.

In 2000 there were 3,346 apartments in the municipality. The most common apartment size was 3 rooms of which there were 1,068. There were 176 single room apartments and 716 apartments with five or more rooms. Of these apartments, a total of 2,334 apartments (69.8% of the total) were permanently occupied, while 675 apartments (20.2%) were seasonally occupied and 337 apartments (10.1%) were empty. As of 2009, the construction rate of new housing units was 2.9 new units per 1000 residents. The vacancy rate for the municipality, in 2010, was 0.43%.

The historical population is given in the following chart:

== Heritage sites of national significance ==
The Church Bell Tower, the Salt Mining Complex, the Fortifications de l’Arzillier and the Bridge over the Rhone River (which is shared with St-Maurice in Valais) are listed as Swiss heritage site of national significance. The entire village of Les Posses and the Le Bévieux area are both part of the Inventory of Swiss Heritage Sites.

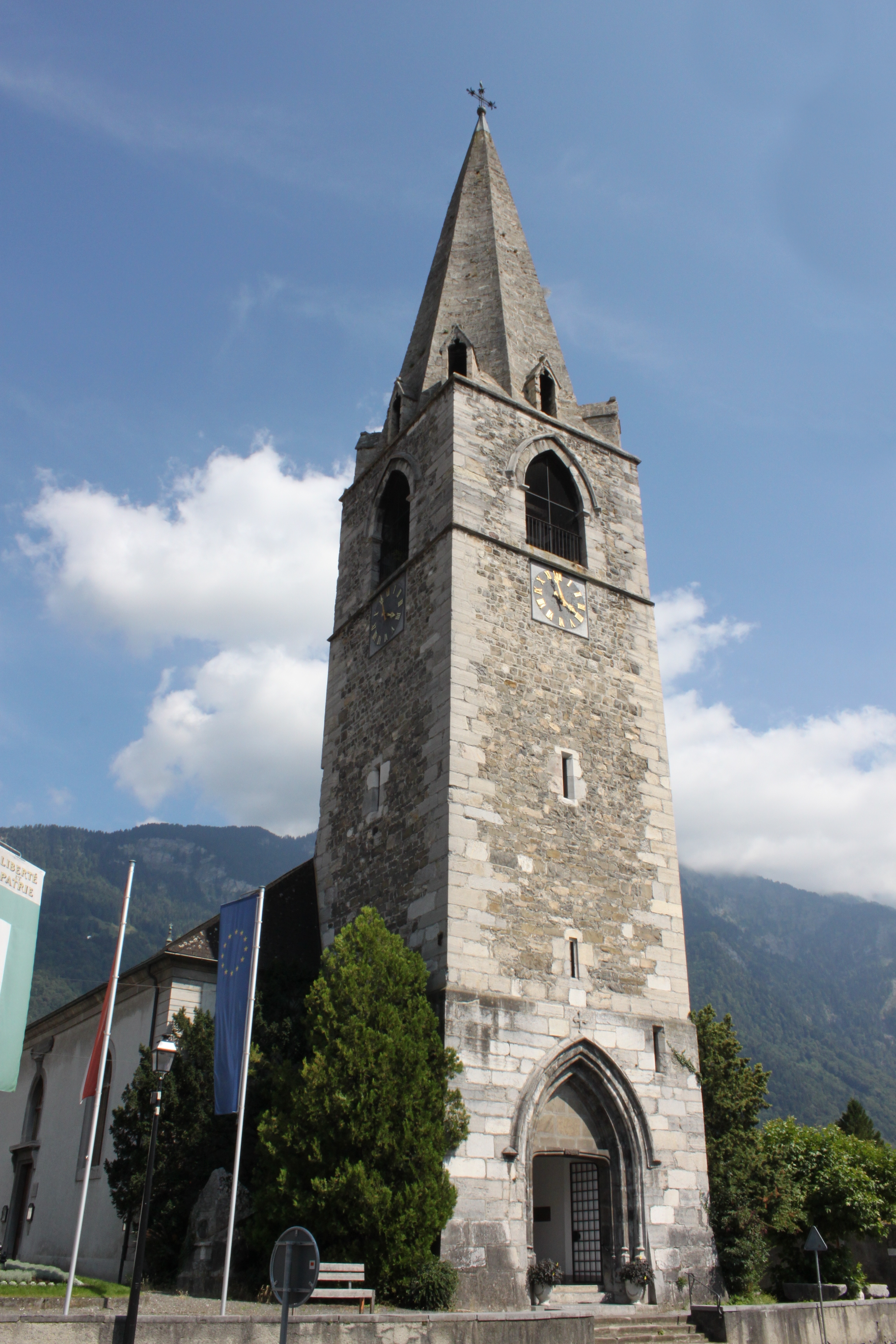
Church Bell Tower

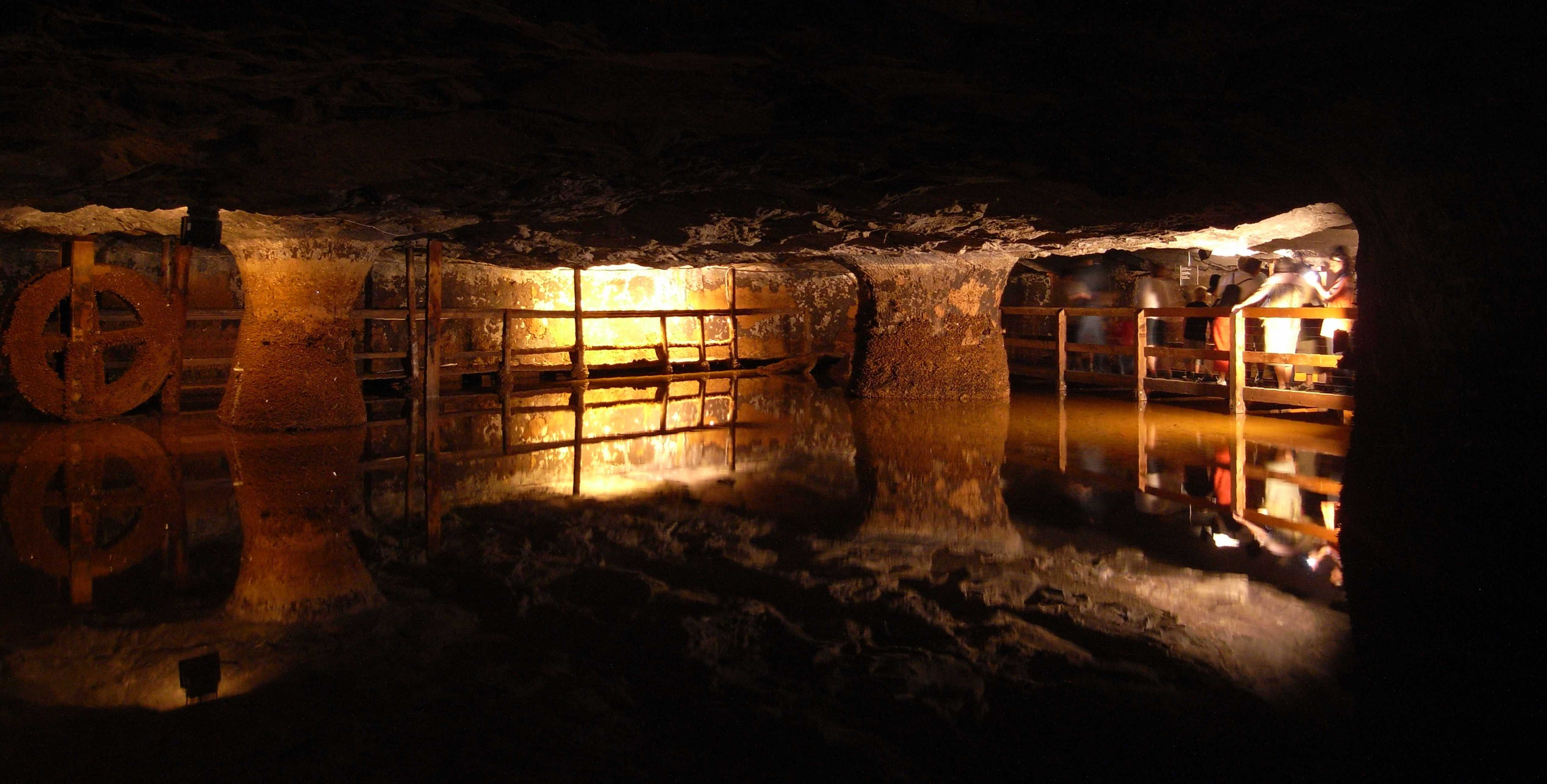
Salt Mining Complex

== Politics ==
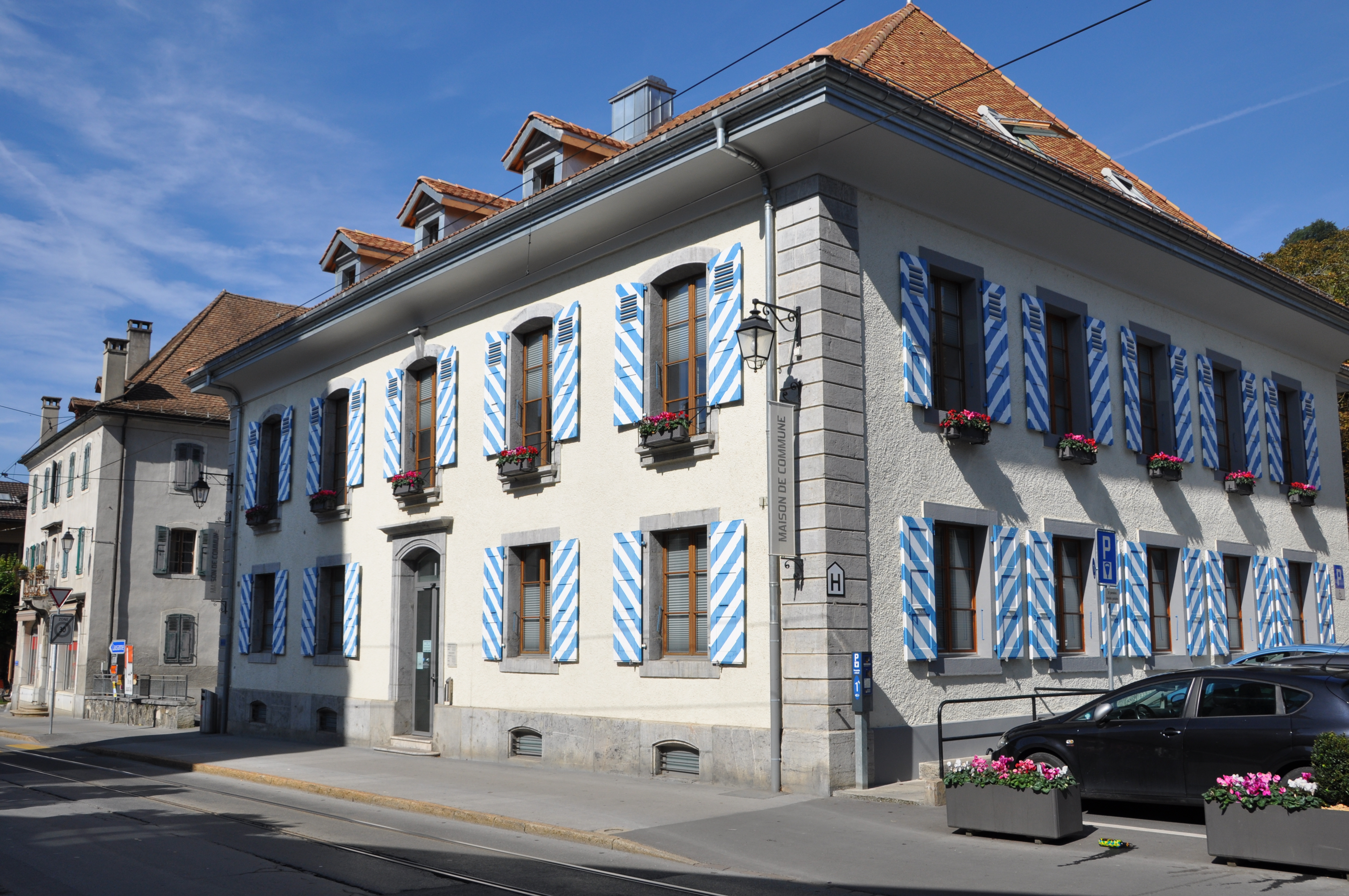
Town hall

In the 2007 federal election the most popular party was the SVP which received 30.69% of the vote. The next three most popular parties were the SP (27.02%), the FDP (12.65%) and the Green Party (11.75%). In the federal election, a total of 1,565 votes were cast, and the voter turnout was 43.1%.

== Economy ==
As of 2010, Bex had an unemployment rate of 6.9%. As of 2008, there were 234 people employed in the primary economic sector and about 66 businesses involved in this sector. 746 people were employed in the secondary sector and there were 72 businesses in this sector. 1,157 people were employed in the tertiary sector, with 196 businesses in this sector. There were 2,608 residents of the municipality who were employed in some capacity, of which females made up 42.5% of the workforce.

In 2008 the total number of full-time equivalent jobs was 1,794. The number of jobs in the primary sector was 137, of which 128 were in agriculture and 9 were in forestry or lumber production. The number of jobs in the secondary sector was 706 of which 361 or (51.1%) were in manufacturing, 51 or (7.2%) were in mining and 178 (25.2%) were in construction. The number of jobs in the tertiary sector was 951. In the tertiary sector; 201 or 21.1% were in wholesale or retail sales or the repair of motor vehicles, 56 or 5.9% were in the movement and storage of goods, 137 or 14.4% were in a hotel or restaurant, 8 or 0.8% were in the information industry, 5 or 0.5% were the insurance or financial industry, 86 or 9.0% were technical professionals or scientists, 82 or 8.6% were in education and 146 or 15.4% were in health care.

In 2000, there were 1,077 workers who commuted into the municipality and 1,294 workers who commuted away. The municipality is a net exporter of workers, with about 1.2 workers leaving the municipality for every one entering. About 4.5% of the workforce coming into Bex are coming from outside Switzerland, while 0.0% of the locals commute out of Switzerland for work. Of the working population, 13.5% used public transportation to get to work, and 61.6% used a private car.

== Religion ==
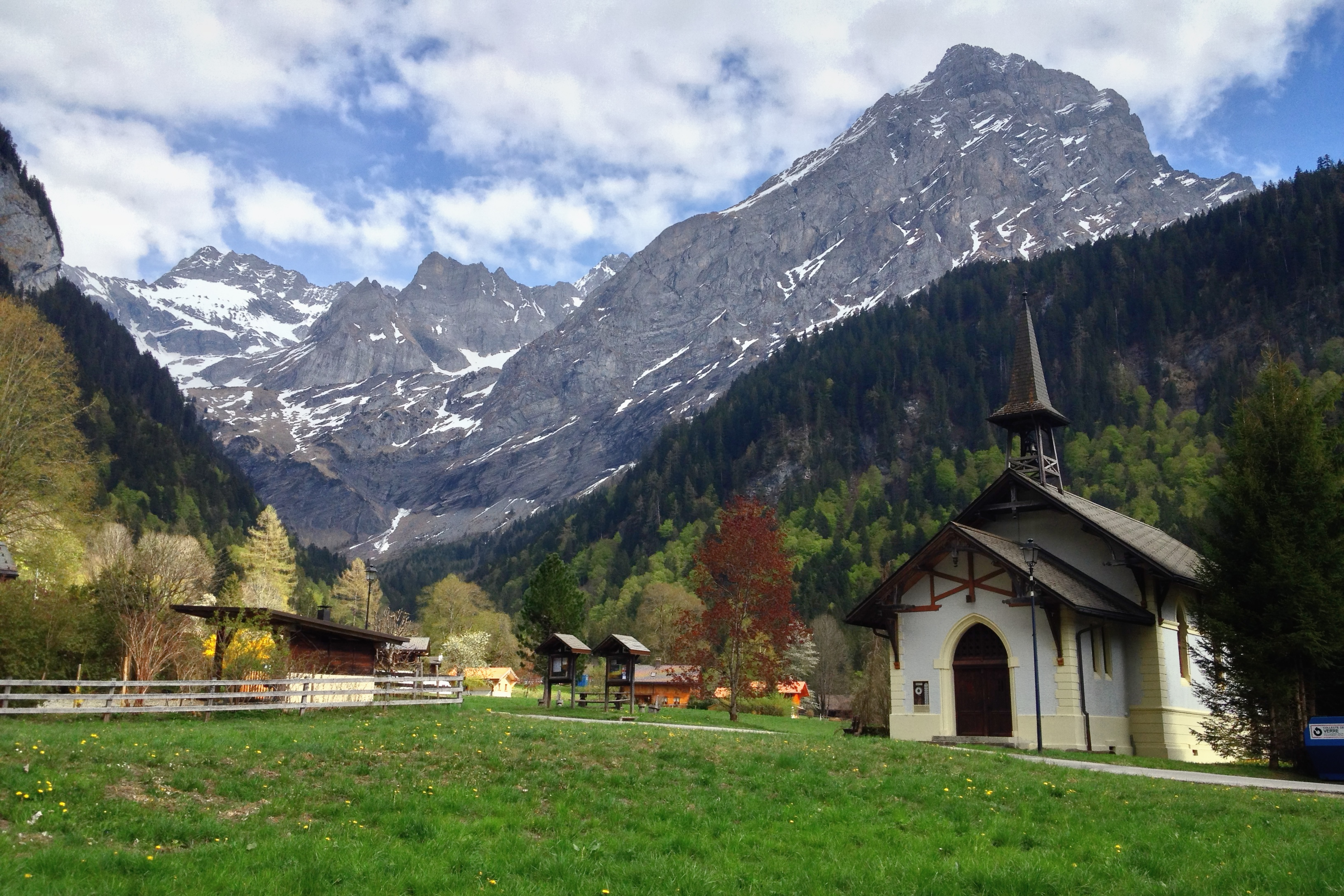
Les Plans-sur-Bex chapel dominated by the Grand Muveran

From the 2000 census, 1,986 or 33.2% were Roman Catholic, while 2,356 or 39.4% belonged to the Swiss Reformed Church. Of the rest of the population, there were 44 members of an Orthodox church (or about 0.74% of the population), there were 5 individuals (or about 0.08% of the population) who belonged to the Christian Catholic Church, and there were 60 individuals (or about 1.00% of the population) who belonged to another Christian church. There were 462 (or about 7.73% of the population) who were Islamic. There were 12 individuals who were Buddhist, 41 individuals who were Hindu and 21 individuals who belonged to another church. 554 (or about 9.28% of the population) belonged to no church, are agnostic or atheist, and 432 individuals (or about 7.23% of the population) did not answer the question.

== Weather ==
Bex has an average of 123.3 days of rain or snow per year and on average receives 1,055 mm (41.5 in) of precipitation. The wettest month is August during which time Bex receives an average of 119 mm (4.7 in) of rain or snow. During this month there is precipitation for an average of 11.5 days. The month with the most days of precipitation is June, with an average of 12.4, but with only 109 mm (4.3 in) of rain or snow. The driest month of the year is February with an average of 69 mm (2.7 in) of precipitation over 9.4 days.

== Education ==
In Bex about 1,897 or (31.8%) of the population have completed non-mandatory upper secondary education, and 523 or (8.8%) have completed additional higher education (either university or a Fachhochschule). Of the 523 who completed tertiary schooling, 52.6% were Swiss men, 29.1% were Swiss women, 11.5% were non-Swiss men and 6.9% were non-Swiss women.

In the 2009/2010 school year there were a total of 790 students in the Bex school district. In the Vaud cantonal school system, two years of non-obligatory pre-school are provided by the political districts. During the school year, the district provided pre-school care for a total of 205 children of which 96 children (46.8%) received subsidized pre-school care. There were 378 students in the primary school program, which lasts four years. The obligatory lower secondary school program lasts for six years and there were 356 students in those schools. There were also 56 students who were home schooled or attended another non-traditional school.

As of 2000, there were 105 students in Bex who came from another municipality, while 189 residents attended schools outside the municipality.

== Transportation and railroads ==
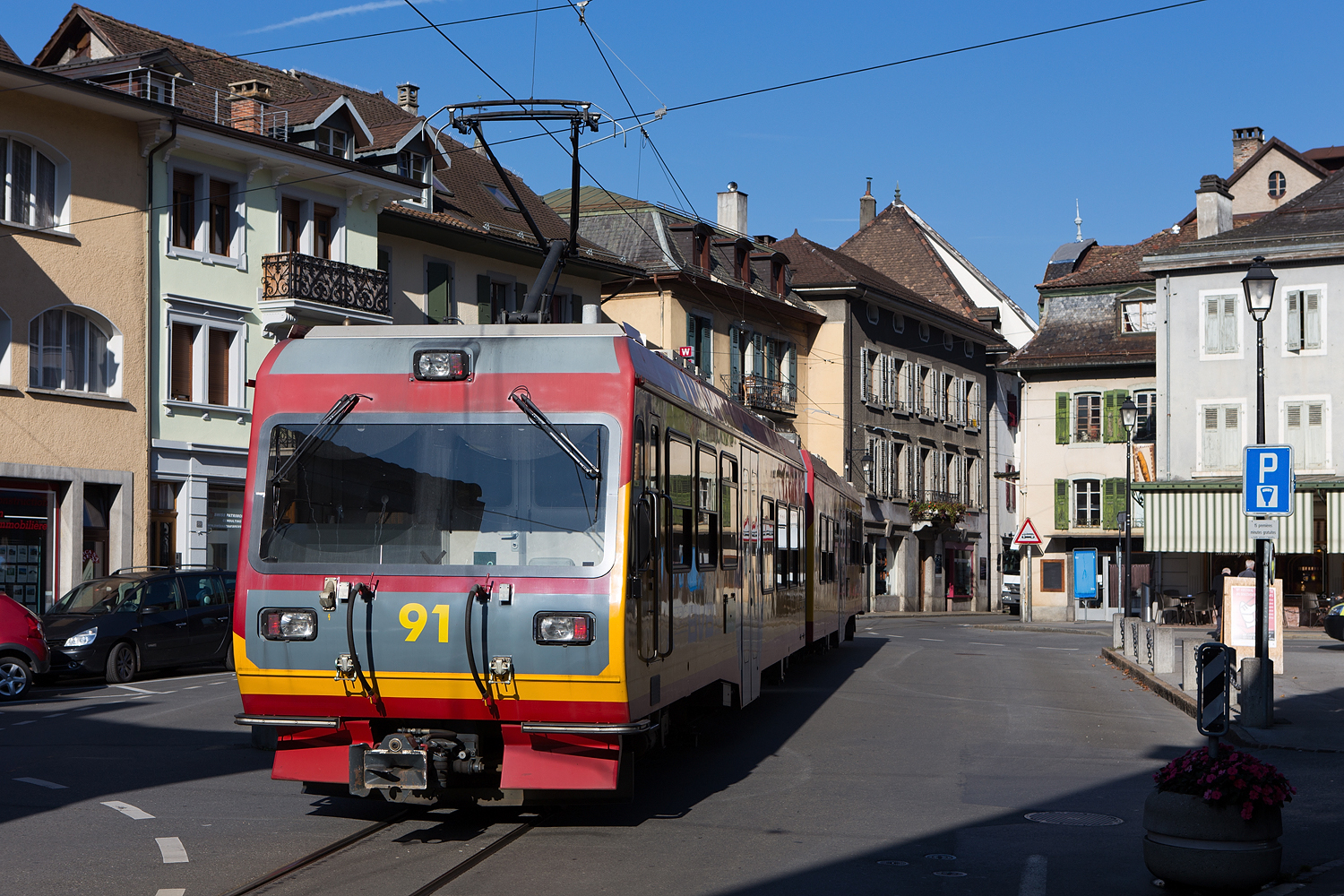
Bex–Villars train passing through the Rue Centrale

Bex is a stop on the Swiss Federal Railways' (SBB/CFF) main-line Simplon route from Italy (Domodossola) and southern Switzerland to Lausanne then on to Geneva. Bex is also the terminus of the Bex–Villars–Bretaye railway (BVB), which is one of four railways of the local TPC company, the Transports Publics du Chablais. The BVB runs east from Bex to Villars and Bretaye. At nearby Aigle, connections are available at the Aigle SBB/CFF station to the other three very scenic narrow gauge railways of TPC.

Transports Publics du Chablais uses the motto "Depuis plus de cent ans et contre toute attente, des lignes des TPC réunissent plaine et montagne, Vaud et Valais, ville et campagne, terres catholiques et protestantes." Translated roughly: "For over 100 years and contrary to all expectations, the railways of TPC have joined plain and mountain, town and country, of the Vaud and Valais districts of Switzerland, land of both Catholics and Protestants." The ASD, the AL, and the BVB railways operate within the Canton of Vaud. The AOMC also operates into the Canton of Valais when it leaves Aigle and crosses the Rhone river to reach Monthey and Champéry. The TPC "motto" refers to the religious composition and history of the region historically known as the Chablais. In 1846-7 the Valais canton attempted to secede from Switzerland with the intention of joining a Catholic confederation of cantons called the Sonderbund, but this was put down by Swiss Federal troops in the brief and relatively bloodless Sonderbund civil war.

== Personalities ==
- Marie-Louise Dreier (born 1936), poet
- Catherine Mabillard (born 1964), ski mountaineer and marathon mountain biker
- Henri François Pittier (1857–1950), geographer and botanist

== Twin towns – sister cities ==
Bex is twinned with:

- Tuttlingen, Germany
