= Vaud Alps =

Part of the Alps mountain range in Switzerland

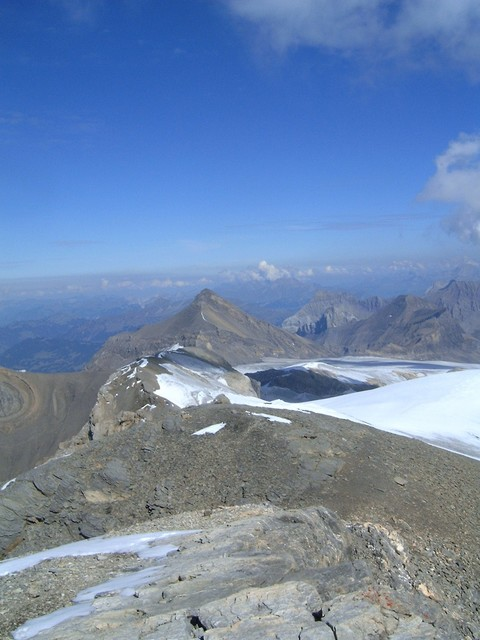
- View from the Sommet des Diablerets to the northeast to the Oldenhorn.

Highest point
- Peak: Diablerets
- Elevation: 3,216 m (10,551 ft)
- Coordinates: 46°18′14″N 7°11′20″E

Naming
- Native name: German: Waadtländer Alpen; French: Alpes vaudoises

Geography
- Country: Switzerland
- Cantons: Vaud and Valais
- Range coordinates: 46°18′N 7°11′E
- Parent range: Bernese Alps
- Topo map: Swiss Federal Office of Topography swisstopo

The Vaud Alps (German: Waadtländer Alpen, French: Alpes vaudoises, Italian: Alpi di Vaud) are a mountain range of the Western Alps, located in western Switzerland. They are sometimes also referred to as the western Bernese Limestone Alps and as an extension of the Bernese Alps. According to SOIUSA, they are thus the western subsection 12.III according to SOIUSA of the Bernese Alps in the wide meaning.

The highest peak is Le Sommet des Diablerets, 3216 m above sea level. In the alpine guides of the Swiss Alpine Club, they are summarised with the Vaudois pre-Alps.

== Alpes Vaudoises, société coopérative (cooperative society) ==
The Vaud Alps are made up of numerous mountain resorts, seven of which are represented by the umbrella brand Alpes Vaudoises, société coopérative (AVSC). It is the promotional body for the Vaud Alps and was formed following the desire of tourist associations to join forces to promote the villages and resorts of Aigle, Bex, Les Diablerets, Gryon, Leysin, Col des Mosses and Villars. Until 2026, the Pays-d'Enhaut destination was also part of Alpes Vaudoises, bringing together the villages of Rossinière, Château-d'Œx and Rougemont.

Alpes Vaudoises, cooperative society is mainly responsible for promoting the resorts and activities in the region, both nationally and internationally. It is also responsible for press and marketing, and manages the website www.alpesvaudoises.ch in collaboration with the tourist offices of the member destinations. The website provides tourist information, event calendars for each village and details of all activities that can be booked online.

== List of peaks ==
The chief peaks of the Vaud Alps are:

	Nom	Altitude
1	Le Sommet des Diablerets	3,216 m (10,551 ft)
2	Oldehorn (Becca d'Audon)	3,123 m (10,246 ft)
3	Grand Muveran	3,051 m (10,010 ft)
4	Tête Ronde	3,036 m (9,961 ft)
5	Sex Rouge	2,971 m (9,747 ft)
6	Grand Dent de Morcles	2,968 m (9,738 ft)
7	Petite Dent de Morcles	2,929 m (9,610 ft)
8	Dent Favre	2,916 m (9,567 ft)
9	Tête à Pierre Grept	2,904 m (9,528 ft)
10	Tête Noire	2,871 m (9,419 ft)
11	Tête aux Veillon	2,846 m (9,337 ft)
12	Pointe de Paneirosse	2,840 m (9,318 ft)
13	Petit Muveran	2,810 m (9,219 ft)
14	Culan	2,789 m (9,150 ft)
15	Pointe d'Aufalle	2,725 m (8,940 ft)
16	Le Tarent	2,548 m (8,360 ft)
17	Haute Pointe (l'Argentine)	2,422 metres (7,946 ft)
18	Tour d'Aï	2,331 m (7,648 ft)
19	Tour de Mayen	2,327 m (7,635 ft)
20	Pointe des Savolaires	2,294 m (7,526 ft)

Note the list of chief peak of Vaud Alps is not complete and is subject to future modifications.
