= Tête aux Chamois =

Mountain in Switzerland

- Location within Switzerland

Highest point
- Elevation: 2,525 m (8,284 ft)
- Prominence: 40 m (130 ft)
- Parent peak: Diablerets
- Coordinates: 46°20′23″N 07°12′53″E

Geography
- Location: Vaud, Switzerland
- Parent range: Bernese Alps

Climbing
- Easiest route: Aerial tramway

The Tête aux Chamois (2,525 m) is a summit of the Diablerets massif, overlooking the Col du Pillon in the canton of Vaud. It is accessible by aerial tramway from the Col du Pillon and from Reusch via Oldenegg (canton of Bern). From the summit of the Tête aux Chamois another aerial tramway leads to the summit of the Scex Rouge and the nearby Tsanfleuron Glacier.

On the northern cliffs is a via ferrata. The mountain hut Cabane des Diablerets, owned by the Swiss Alpine Club, is located on the saddle south of the summit (2,485 m).

== See also ==
- List of mountains of Switzerland accessible by public transport
