= Wittenberghorn =

Mountain in Switzerland

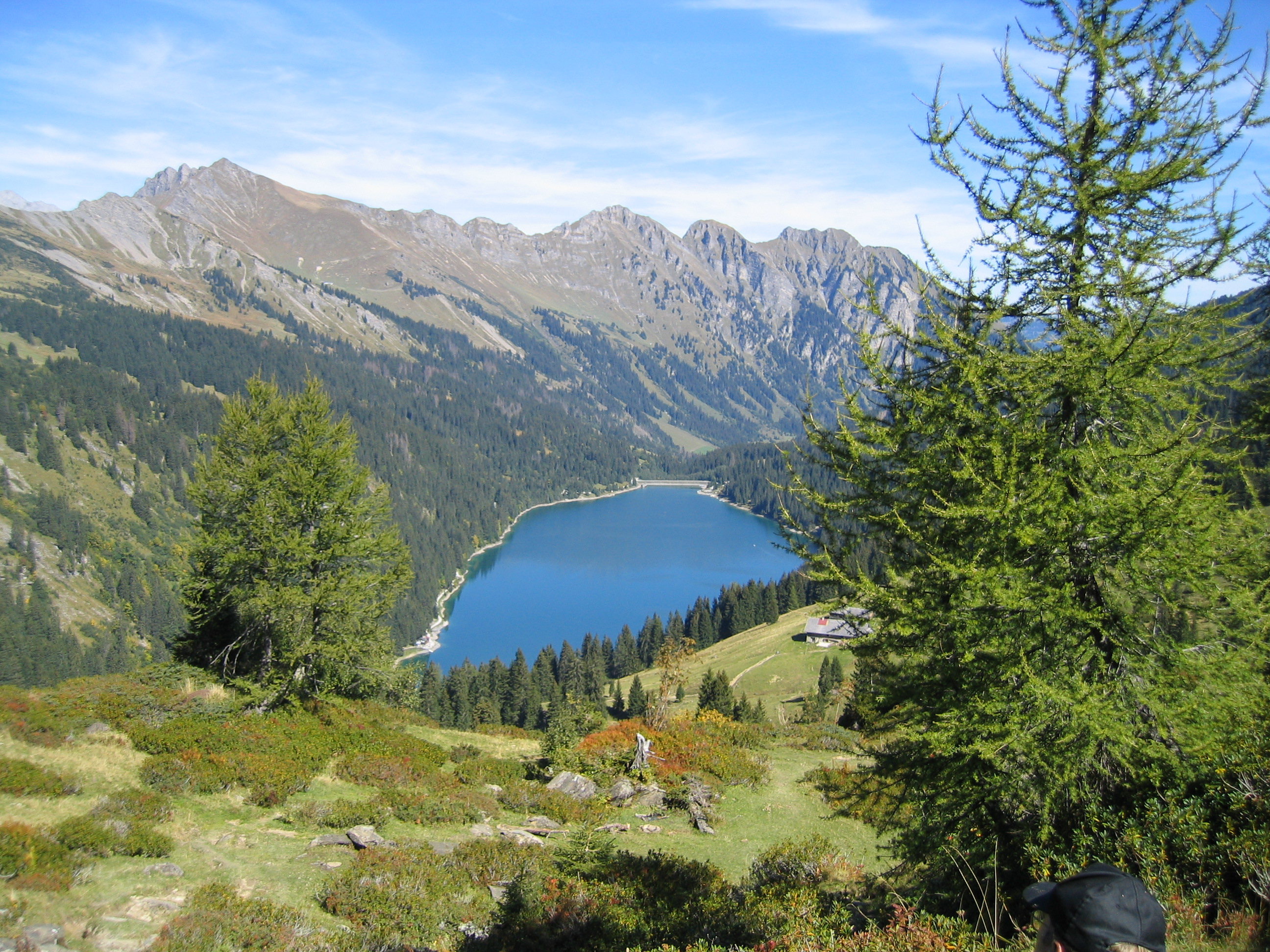
- The Wittenberghorn (left) with the Arnensee

Highest point
- Elevation: 2,350 m (7,710 ft)
- Prominence: 465 m (1,526 ft)
- Parent peak: Le Tarent
- Coordinates: 46°24′58.1″N 7°12′35.7″E

Geography
- Location within Switzerland
- Location: Vaud/Bern, Switzerland
- Parent range: Bernese Alps

The Wittenberghorn is a mountain of the Bernese Alps, located on the border between the Swiss cantons of Vaud and Bern. It lies approximately halfway between L'Etivaz (Vaud) and Feutersoey (Bern), south of the Col de Jable.
