= Pas de Cheville =

High pass in western Bernese Alps, Switzerland

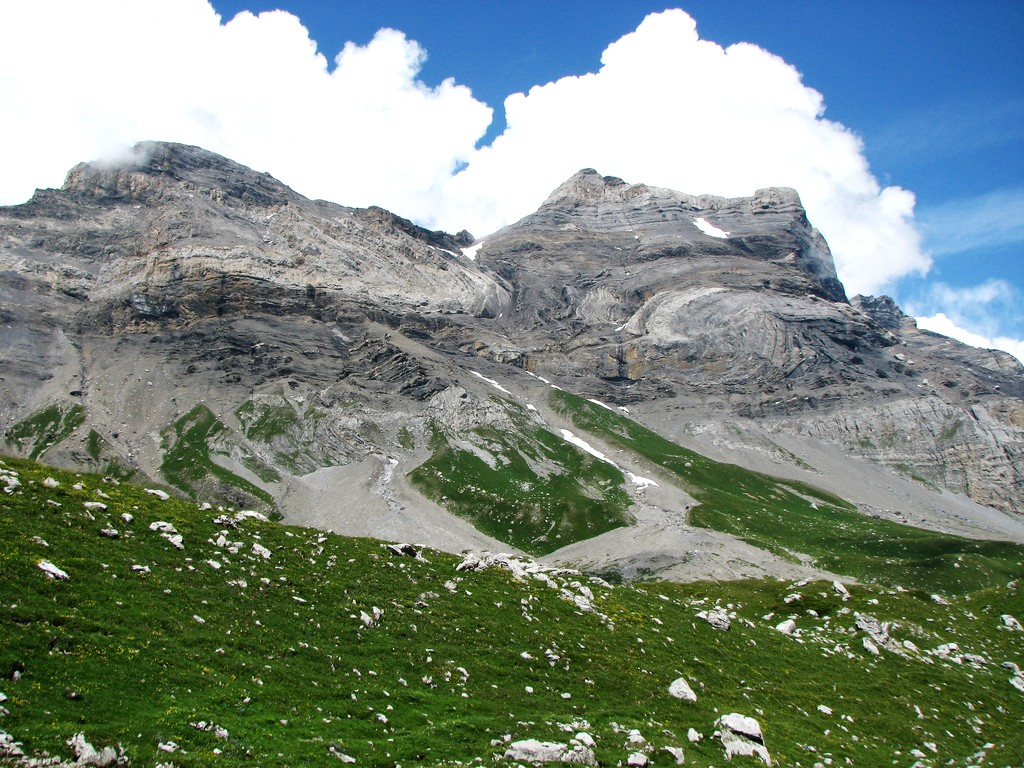
- The Diablerets as seen from Pas de Cheville
- Interactive map of Pas de Cheville
- Elevation: 2,038 metres (6,686 ft)
- Traversed by: Trail

Third Approach
- Location: Switzerland
- Range: Vaud Alps
- Coordinates: 46°17′14″N 7°11′30″E

The Pas de Cheville (2038 m) (also the Col de Cheville) is a high mountain pass across the Vaud Alps (western Bernese Alps), connecting Gryon in the canton of Vaud in Switzerland and Derborence in the canton of Valais.

The pass lies between Les Diablerets in the north and Tête à Pierre Grept, Grand Muveran to the south.

== See also ==
- List of mountain passes in Switzerland
