= Gsteig bei Gstaad =

Municipality in canton of Bern, Switzerland

- Municipality
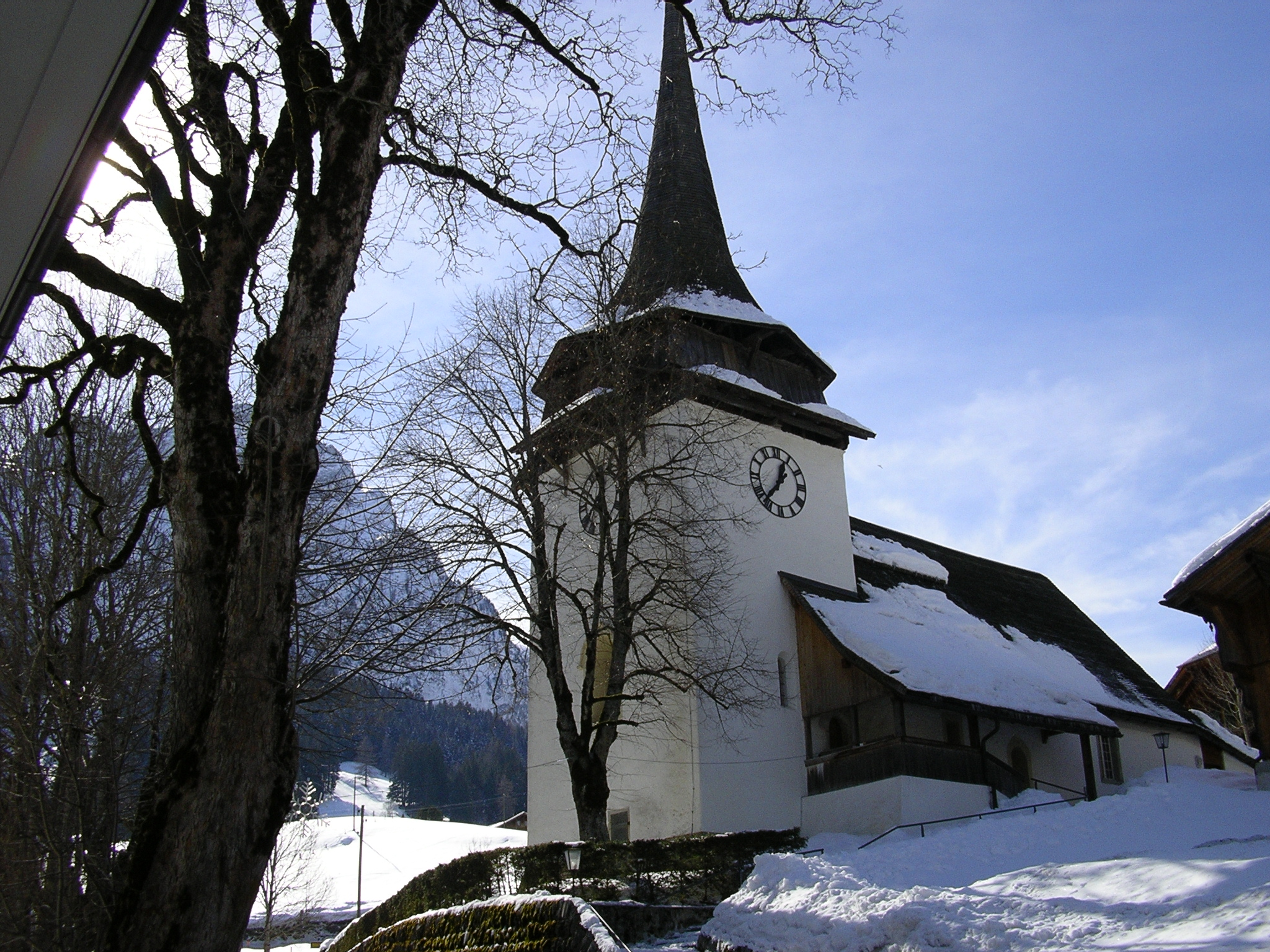

- Flag Coat of arms
- Location of Gsteig bei Gstaad
- Location within Switzerland Location within Canton of Bern
- Coordinates: 46°23′N 7°16′E
- Country: Switzerland
- Canton: Bern
- District: Obersimmental-Saanen

Area
  - Total: 62.44 km^{2} (24.11 sq mi)
- Elevation: 1,184 m (3,885 ft)

Population (Dec 2011)
  - Total: 970
  - Density: 16/km^{2} (40/sq mi)
- Time zone: UTC+01:00 (CET)
  - Summer (DST): UTC+02:00 (CEST)
- Postal code: 3785
- SFOS number: 841
- ISO 3166 code: CH-BE
- Surrounded by: Château-d'Œx (VD), Lauenen, Ormont-Dessus (VD), Saanen, Savièse (VS)
- Website: www.gsteig.ch

Gsteig bei Gstaad is a municipality in the Obersimmental-Saanen administrative district in the canton of Bern in Switzerland. Gsteig was formerly known by the French name of Châtelet.

== History ==
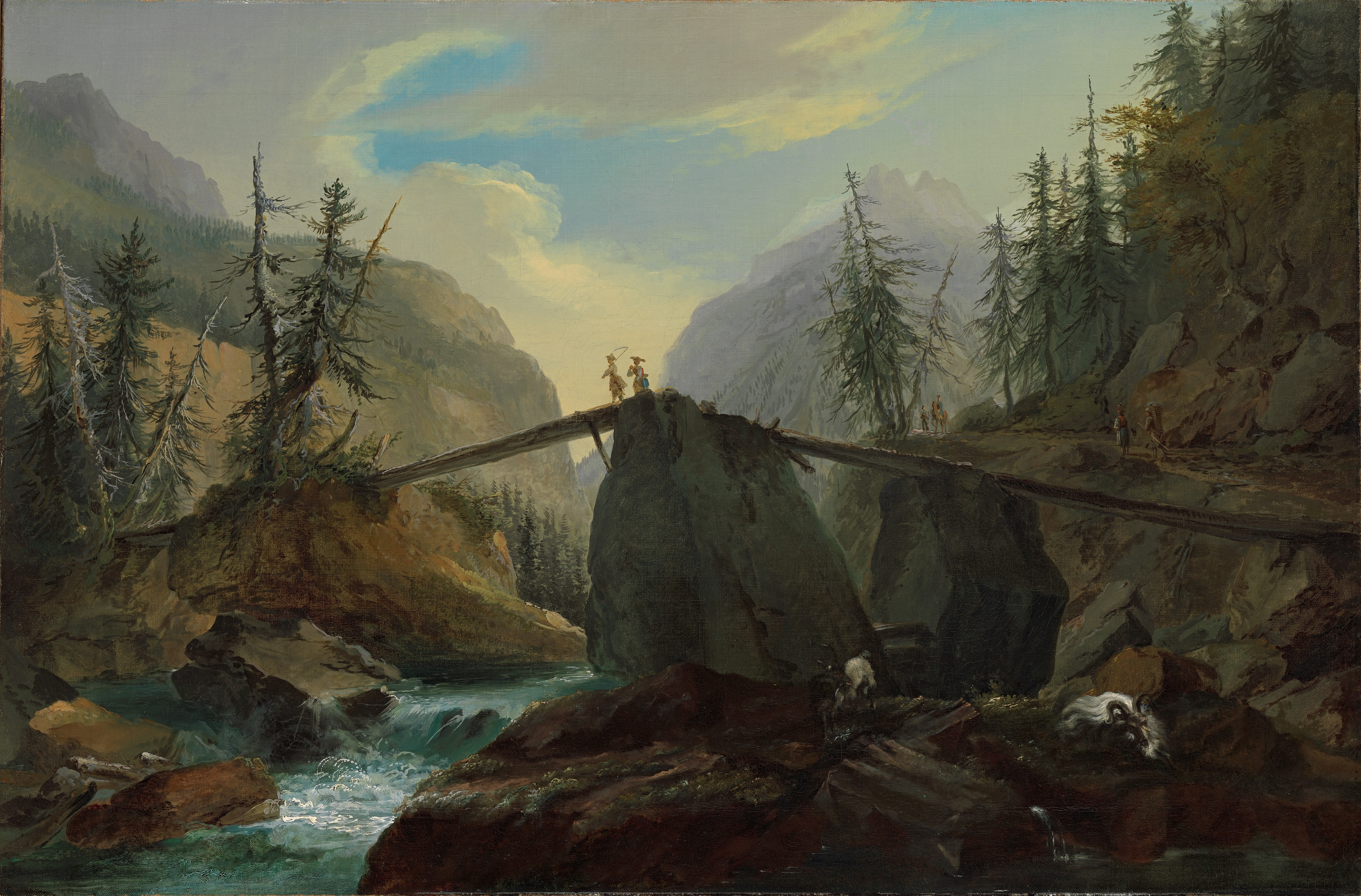
Painting by Caspar Wolf from 1774 showing a wooden bridge over the Lütschine river near Gsteig

Aerial view of Gsteig with Schluchhorn and Oldenhorn (1946)

Gsteig is first mentioned in 1312 as Chastelet. In 1453, it was mentioned as Steig.

The villages of Gsteig and Feutersoey grew up along the roads over the Col du Pillon and the Sanetsch Pass. During the Middle Ages, a castle was built in the valley to protect and control the passes. The castle is first mentioned in 1458 and today is in ruins. At one time there was a settlement at Ussers Gründ which was destroyed by a landslide. Originally Gsteig was part of the district and parish of Saanen. The village church of St. Theodul was consecrated in 1453. It became a filial church of Saanen in 1500. In the early 16th century, Bern adopted the new faith of the Protestant Reformation, however Gsteig did not convert until 1556.

Traditionally the villagers practiced seasonal alpine herding and farming and made a little money off trade over the passes. Beginning around 1900, tourism became a major part of the local economy. Today there are several hotels and a number of vacation homes in the municipality. Tourist sites include the Diablerets Glacier, the castle ruins, the Arnensee and the nature preserve at Oldenhorn.

== Geography ==
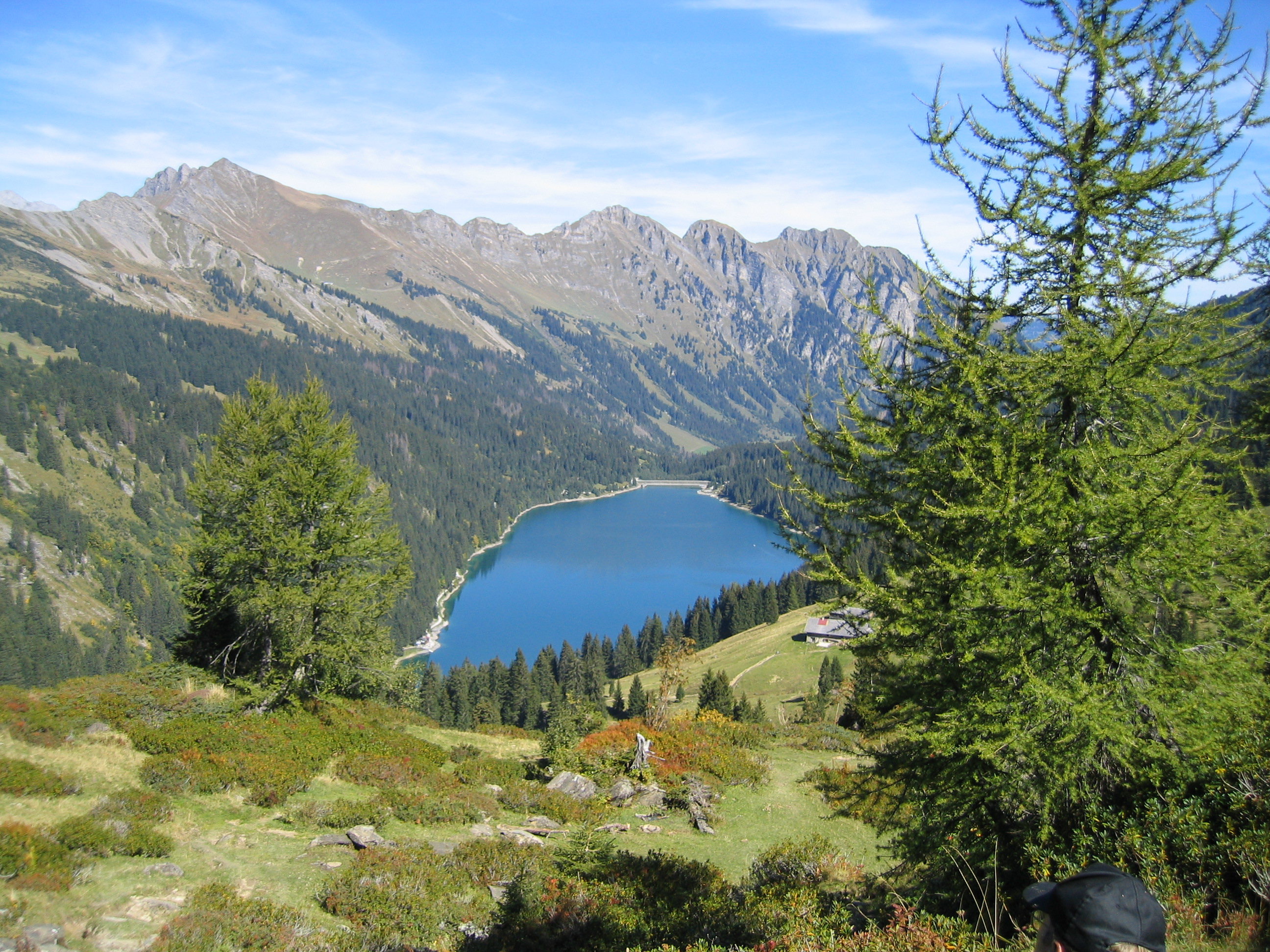
The Arnensee reservoir near Gsteig

Gsteig bei Gstaad has an area of 62.41 km^{2} (24.10 sq mi). As of 2012, a total of 23.16 km^{2} (8.94 mi^{2}) or 37.1% is used for agricultural purposes, while 22.6 km^{2} (8.7 mi^{2}) or 36.2% is forested. The rest of the municipality is 0.86 km^{2} (0.33 mi^{2}) or 1.4% is settled (buildings or roads), 0.78 km^{2} (0.30 mi^{2}) or 1.2% is either rivers or lakes and 15.01 km^{2} (5.80 mi^{2}) or 24.0% is unproductive land.

During the same year, housing and buildings made up 0.7% and transportation infrastructure made up 0.6%. A total of 28.8% of the total land area is heavily forested and 5.4% is covered with orchards or small clusters of trees. Of the agricultural land, 8.7% is pasturage and 28.4% is used for alpine pastures. Of the water in the municipality, 0.8% is in lakes and 0.5% is in rivers and streams. Of the unproductive areas, 9.2% is unproductive vegetation and 14.6% is too rocky for vegetation.

The municipality lies in an upper valley of the river Saane in the Bernese Oberland and consists of the villages of Gsteig and Feutersoey, plus a number of outlying farms. The route to the Col du Pillon, an alpine pass, runs through both villages. Near the pass is the locality of Reusch, where an aerial tramway to the Scex Rouge is operated.

The reservoir Arnensee is located in the municipality.

On 31 December 2009 Amtsbezirk Saanen, the municipality's former district, was dissolved. On the following day, 1 January 2010, it joined the newly created Verwaltungskreis Obersimmental-Saanen.

== Coat of arms ==
The blazon of the municipal coat of arms is Gules a Crane rising Argent beaked and membered Or on a Mount of 3 Coupeaux of the second all dimidiated impaled with Azure a Tower embatteled Or.

== Demographics ==
Gsteig bei Gstaad has a population (as of December 2020) of 981. As of 2011, 13.0% of the population are resident foreign nationals. Over the last year (2010-2011) the population has changed at a rate of -1.3%. Migration accounted for -1.7%, while births and deaths accounted for 0.3%.

Most of the population (as of 2000) speaks German (849 or 93.2%) as their first language, French is the second most common (20 or 2.2%) and English is the third (10 or 1.1%). There are 2 people who speak Italian and 4 people who speak Romansh.

Of the population in the municipality, 457 or about 50.2% were born in Gsteig bei Gstaad and lived there in 2000. There were 275 or 30.2% who were born in the same canton, while 85 or 9.3% were born somewhere else in Switzerland, and 74 or 8.1% were born outside of Switzerland.

As of 2011, children and teenagers (0–19 years old) make up 19.1% of the population, while adults (20–64 years old) make up 63.9% and seniors (over 64 years old) make up 17%.

As of 2000, there were 381 people who were single and never married in the municipality. There were 440 married individuals, 64 widows or widowers and 26 individuals who are divorced.

As of 2010, there were 171 households that consist of only one person and 23 households with five or more people. In 2000, a total of 382 apartments (67.3% of the total) were permanently occupied, while 155 apartments (27.3%) were seasonally occupied and 31 apartments (5.5%) were empty. As of 2010, the construction rate of new housing units was 4.1 new units per 1000 residents. The vacancy rate for the municipality, in 2010, was 0.28%. In 2011, single family homes made up 33.4% of the total housing in the municipality.

The historical population is given in the following chart:

== Heritage sites of national significance ==
The farm house at Saali 594 and the farm house in Feutersoey at Zelg 408 are listed as Swiss heritage site of national significance. The entire village of Gsteig is part of the Inventory of Swiss Heritage Sites.

== Politics ==
In the 2011 federal election the most popular party was the Swiss People's Party (SVP) which received 61.9% of the vote. The next three most popular parties were the Conservative Democratic Party (BDP) (14.5%), the Green Liberal Party (GLP) (7.1%) and the Social Democratic Party (SP) (4.9%). In the federal election, a total of 363 votes were cast, and the voter turnout was 49.5%.

== Economy ==
As of 2011, Gsteig bei Gstaad had an unemployment rate of 1.05%. As of 2008, there were a total of 350 people employed in the municipality. Of these, there were 133 people employed in the primary economic sector and about 53 businesses involved in this sector. 73 people were employed in the secondary sector and there were 15 businesses in this sector. 144 people were employed in the tertiary sector, with 28 businesses in this sector. There were 494 residents of the municipality who were employed in some capacity, of which females made up 40.5% of the workforce.

In 2008 there were a total of 269 full-time equivalent jobs. The number of jobs in the primary sector was 79, all of which were in agriculture. The number of jobs in the secondary sector was 67 of which 21 or (31.3%) were in manufacturing and 43 (64.2%) were in construction. The number of jobs in the tertiary sector was 123. In the tertiary sector; 49 or 39.8% were in wholesale or retail sales or the repair of motor vehicles, 6 or 4.9% were in the movement and storage of goods, 38 or 30.9% were in a hotel or restaurant, 3 or 2.4% were technical professionals or scientists, 9 or 7.3% were in education.

In 2000, there were 55 workers who commuted into the municipality and 264 workers who commuted away. The municipality is a net exporter of workers, with about 4.8 workers leaving the municipality for every one entering. A total of 230 workers (80.7% of the 285 total workers in the municipality) both lived and worked in Gsteig bei Gstaad. Of the working population, 8.7% used public transportation to get to work, and 62.3% used a private car.

In 2011 the average local and cantonal tax rate on a married resident, with two children, of Gsteig bei Gstaad making 150,000 CHF was 12.3%, while an unmarried resident's rate was 18.1%. For comparison, the average rate for the entire canton in the same year, was 14.2% and 22.0%, while the nationwide average was 12.3% and 21.1% respectively.

In 2009 there were a total of 410 tax payers in the municipality. Of that total, 99 made over 75,000 CHF per year. There were 5 people who made between 15,000 and 20,000 per year. The greatest number of workers, 118, made between 50,000 and 75,000 CHF per year. The average income of the over 75,000 CHF group in Gsteig bei Gstaad was 112,324 CHF, while the average across all of Switzerland was 130,478 CHF.

In 2011 a total of 2.1% of the population received direct financial assistance from the government.

== Religion ==
From the 2000 census, 737 or 80.9% belonged to the Swiss Reformed Church, while 81 or 8.9% were Roman Catholic. Of the rest of the population, there was 1 member of an Orthodox church, and there were 21 individuals (or about 2.31% of the population) who belonged to another Christian church. There were 14 (or about 1.54% of the population) who were Muslim. There was 1 person who was Buddhist and 1 individual who belonged to another church. 41 (or about 4.50% of the population) belonged to no church, are agnostic or atheist, and 14 individuals (or about 1.54% of the population) did not answer the question.

== Education ==
In Gsteig bei Gstaad about 54.2% of the population have completed non-mandatory upper secondary education, and 8.2% have completed additional higher education (either university or a Fachhochschule). Of the 46 who had completed some form of tertiary schooling listed in the census, 65.2% were Swiss men, 10.9% were Swiss women, 19.6% were non-Swiss men.

The Canton of Bern school system provides one year of non-obligatory Kindergarten, followed by six years of Primary school. This is followed by three years of obligatory lower Secondary school where the students are separated according to ability and aptitude. Following the lower Secondary students may attend additional schooling or they may enter an apprenticeship.

During the 2011–12 school year, there were a total of 71 students attending classes in Gsteig bei Gstaad. There was one kindergarten class with a total of 7 students in the municipality. Of the kindergarten students, 14.3% were permanent or temporary residents of Switzerland (not citizens). The municipality had 2 primary classes and 54 students. Of the primary students, 11.1% were permanent or temporary residents of Switzerland (not citizens) and 9.3% have a different mother language than the classroom language. During the same year, there was one lower secondary class with a total of 10 students. There were 20.0% who were permanent or temporary residents of Switzerland (not citizens) and 20.0% have a different mother language than the classroom language.

As of 2000, there were a total of 96 students attending any school in the municipality. Of those, 95 both lived and attended school in the municipality, while one student came from another municipality. During the same year, 27 residents attended schools outside the municipality.
