= Peak Walk =

Pedestrian suspension bridge in Vaud, Switzerland

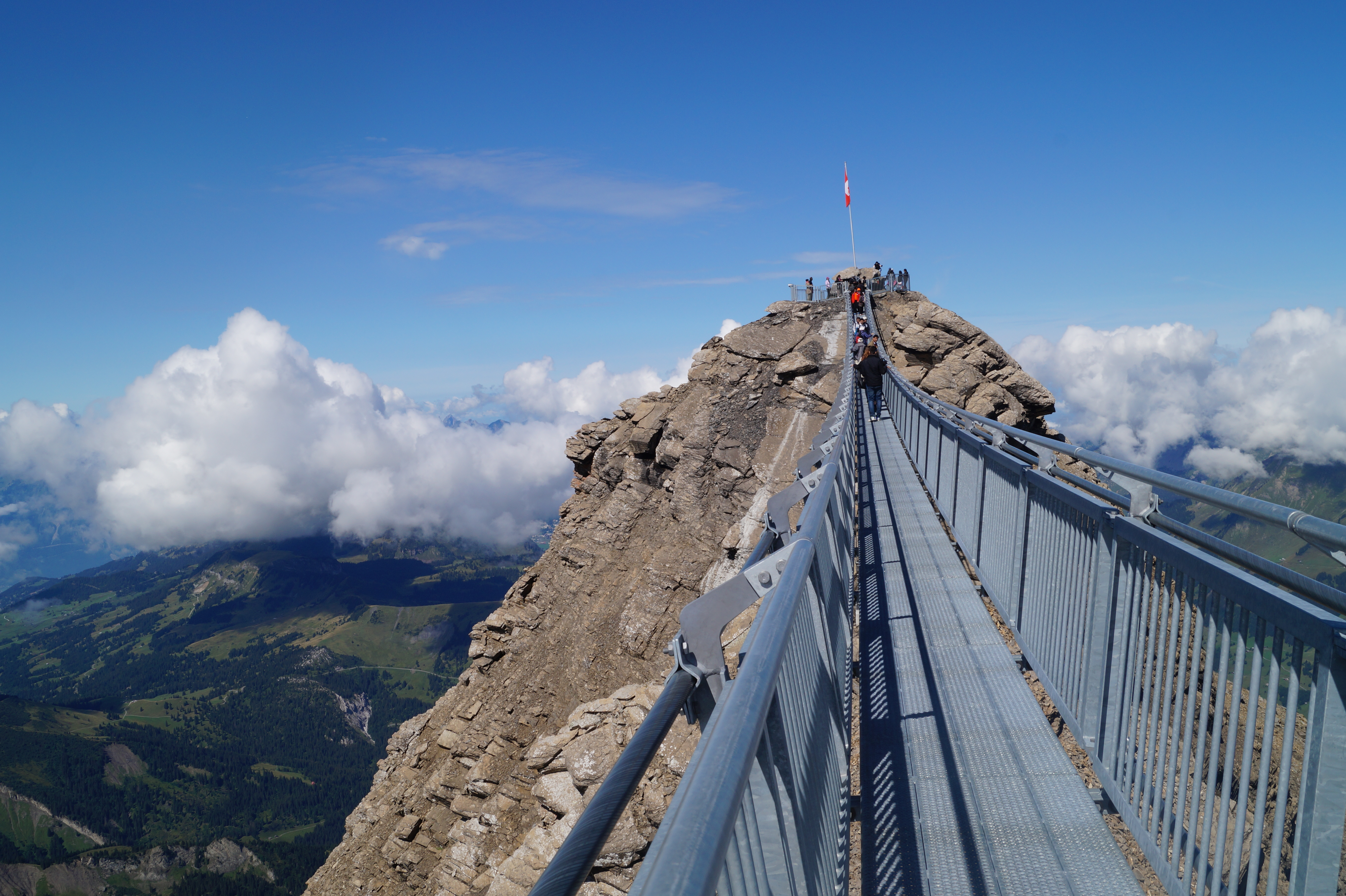
- View towards the Scex Rouge
- Coordinates: 46°19′37″N 7°12′11″E
- Carries: Pedestrians
- Locale: Vaud

Characteristics
- Design: Suspension bridge
- Total length: 107 m (351 ft)
- Width: 0.8 m (2.6 ft)
- Clearance below: 2,956.56 m (9,700.0 ft) above sea level

History
- Opened: October 25, 2014

Statistics
- Toll: Free

Location
- Interactive map of Peak Walk

Peak Walk is a pedestrian suspension bridge linking two mountain peaks in the Swiss Alps. It is situated in the Diablerets massif of the Bernese Alps in the canton of Vaud, and connects the peak of Scex Rouge with another peak. On the other peak is the viewpoint of the Glacier 3000 company. Scex Rouge is about 5 m (16 ft) higher than Glacier 3000's viewpoint. Peak Walk is the world's first suspension bridge which connects two mountain peaks.

The bridge, which has been built by the firm Seiler AG (Steel and metal constructions) in Bönigen, is 107 m (351 ft) long, 0.8 m (2.6 ft) wide and 1.2 m (3.9 ft) high with a 15% slope. It has four pieces of key supporting steel cables with a 120 tonne loading capacity. Peak Walk is anchored by 20 pieces in the rock. (Note: "Download the factsheet". (1.26 MB) to see the previous reference) It is expected that the current number of summertime visitors of around 50,000 will double as a result of the new bridge. The designers took the extreme conditions into account, with winds of about 200 km/h (120 mph). Mountains that can be seen from the bridge include Mont Blanc (the Alps' highest point), the Matterhorn, Mönch, Jungfrau and Eiger, and the bridge has a partial glass floor that afford views down through it. In addition, the bridge became the world's second highest suspension bridge after the Titlis Cliff Walk, which is 3,000 m (9,800 ft) above sea level. The thin air at high altitudes and poor weather hampered construction work, and summer storms delayed the transportation of construction materials.
