= Mont Gond =

Mountain in Switzerland

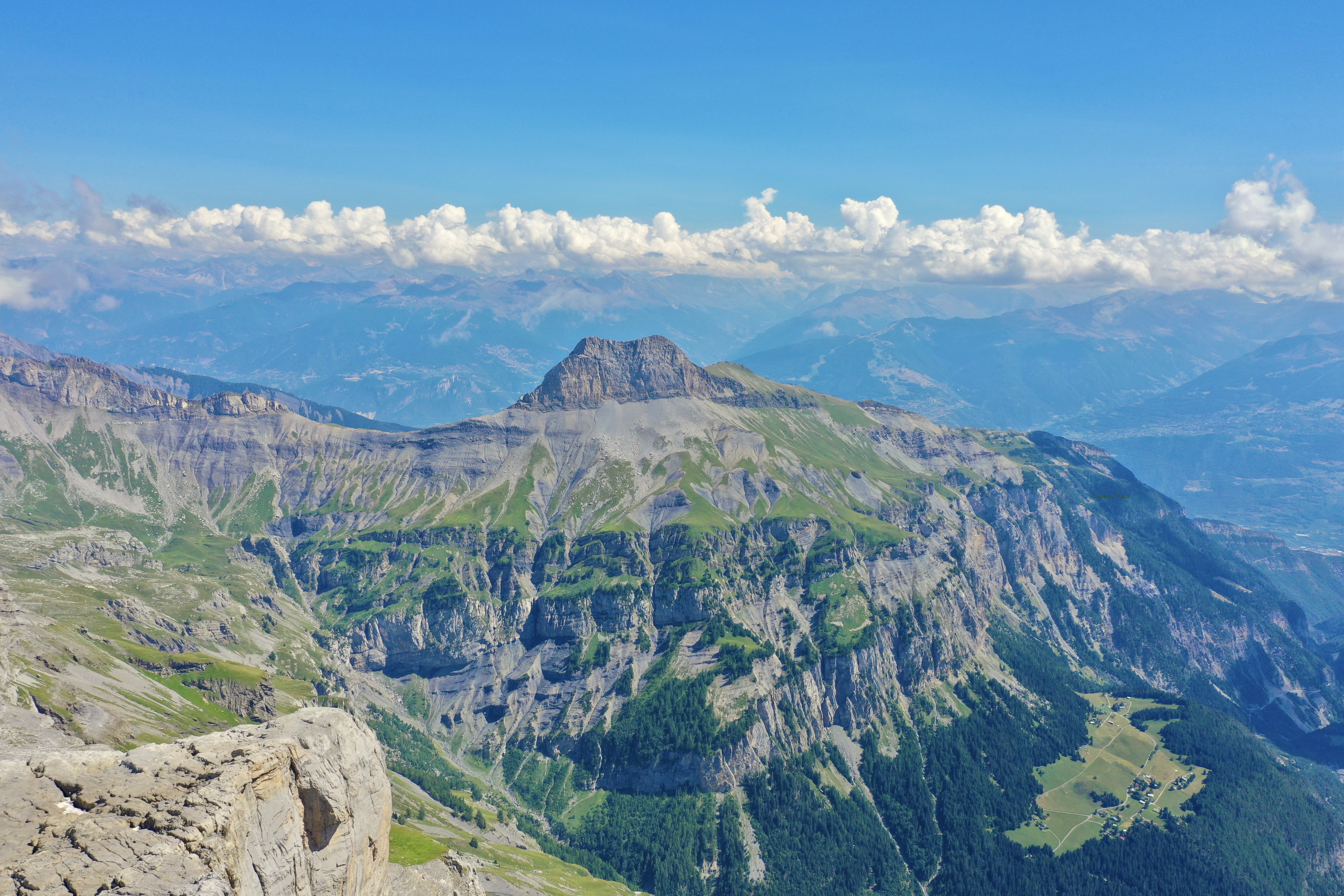
- Mont Gond, from Quille du Diable

Highest point
- Elevation: 2,710 m (8,890 ft)
- Prominence: 395 m (1,296 ft)
- Parent peak: Diablerets
- Coordinates: 46°17′07.9″N 7°15′48.7″E

Geography
- Location within Switzerland
- Location: Valais, Switzerland
- Parent range: Bernese Alps

Mont Gond is a mountain of the Bernese Alps, overlooking Derborence in Valais. It is located between the Diablerets and the Rhone valley. Etang de Trente Pas is a small lake and bog below Mont Gond.
