= Tête Ronde =

Mountain in Switzerland

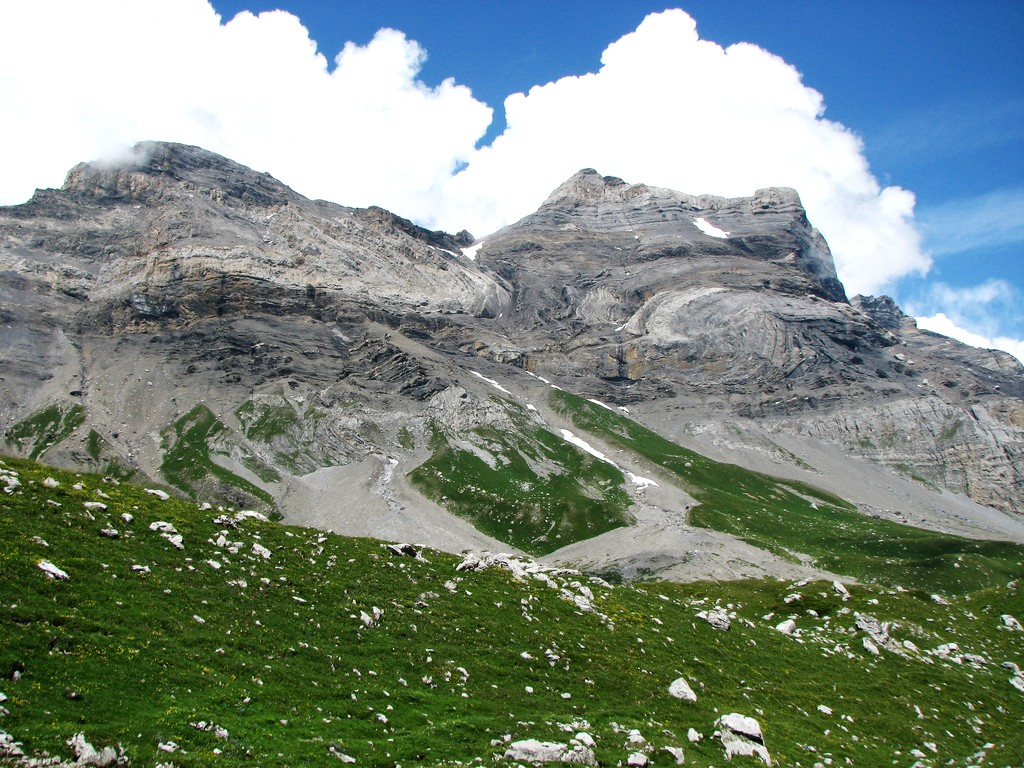
- Tête Ronde (left) and the Diablerets from Pas de Cheville

Highest point
- Elevation: 3,037 m (9,964 ft)
- Prominence: 108 m (354 ft)
- Parent peak: Diablerets
- Coordinates: 46°18′13.8″N 7°10′40.1″E

Geography
- Location within Switzerland
- Location: Vaud, Switzerland
- Parent range: Bernese Alps

The Tête Ronde is a mountain of the Bernese Alps, located in the canton of Vaud, near the summit of the Diablerets massif of which it is a part. With an elevation of 3,037 metres above sea level, the Tête Ronde is the highest summit entirely within the canton of Vaud. Within the Diablerets massif, two summits that form part of the canton's border, the Diableret summit directly to the east and Oldenhorn peak, a short distance to the northeast, are both higher than the Tête Ronde.
