= Le Tarent =

Mountain in Switzerland

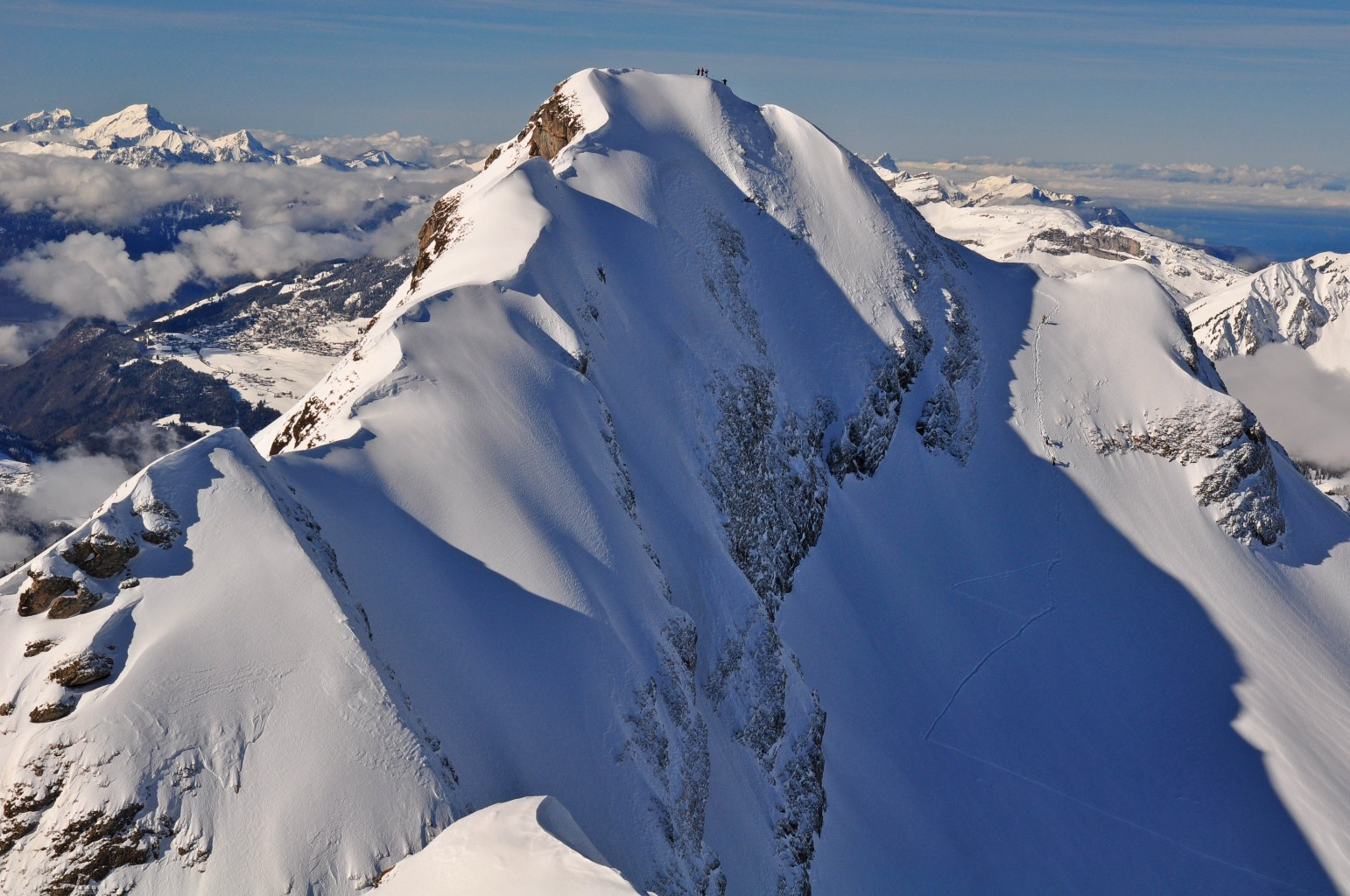
- Le Tarent from La Para

Highest point
- Elevation: 2,548 m (8,360 ft)
- Prominence: 1,002 m (3,287 ft)
- Coordinates: 46°22′55.9″N 7°8′50.9″E

Geography
- Location within Switzerland
- Location: Vaud, Switzerland
- Parent range: Vaud Alps

Le Tarent is a mountain in the western Bernese Alps, overlooking Les Diablerets in the canton of Vaud. At 2,548 metres above sea level, it is the highest mountain of the range lying north of the Col du Pillon. The mountain, which lies near the border with the canton of Bern, is composed of several subsidiary summits, the highest being the Châtillon (2,478 m) and La Para (2,540 m).
