= L'Argentine =

Mountain in Switzerland

- Haute Pointe
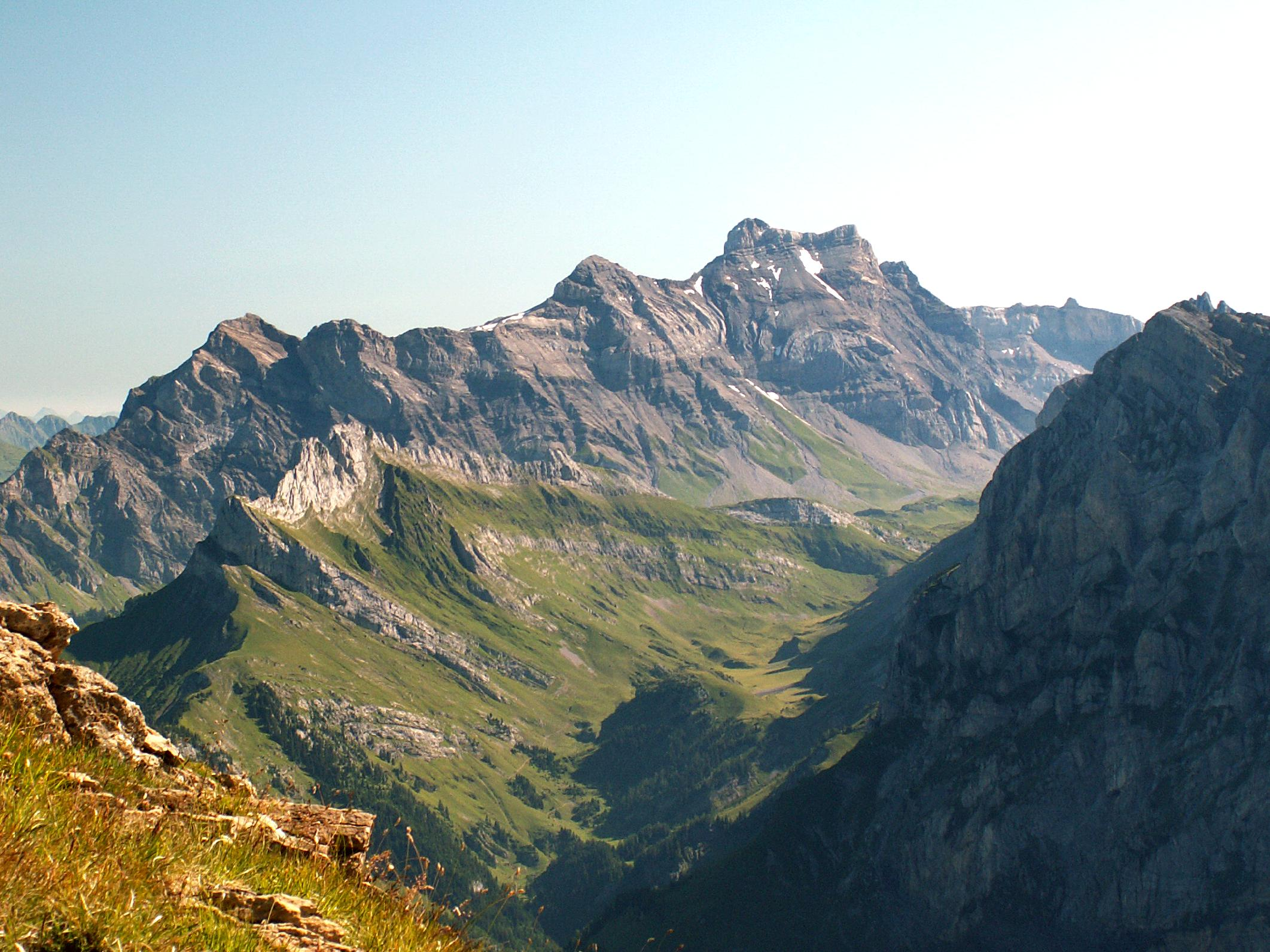
- L'Argentine (centre left) and the Diablerets (background)

Highest point
- Elevation: 2,421 m (7,943 ft)
- Prominence: 393 m (1,289 ft)
- Parent peak: Finsteraarhorn
- Coordinates: 46°16′23.8″N 7°07′55.1″E

Geography
- Location within Switzerland
- Location: Vaud, Switzerland
- Parent range: Bernese Alps

L'Argentine is a mountain of the Vaud Alps, overlooking Solalex above Gryon in the canton of Vaud. The mountain is known by climbers for its Northwest face, the Miroir d'Argentine, which is smooth like a "mirror". The summit is distinguished by the name Haute Pointe and culminates at 2,421 metres above sea level.
