= La Para =

Mountain in Switzerland

- La Tornette
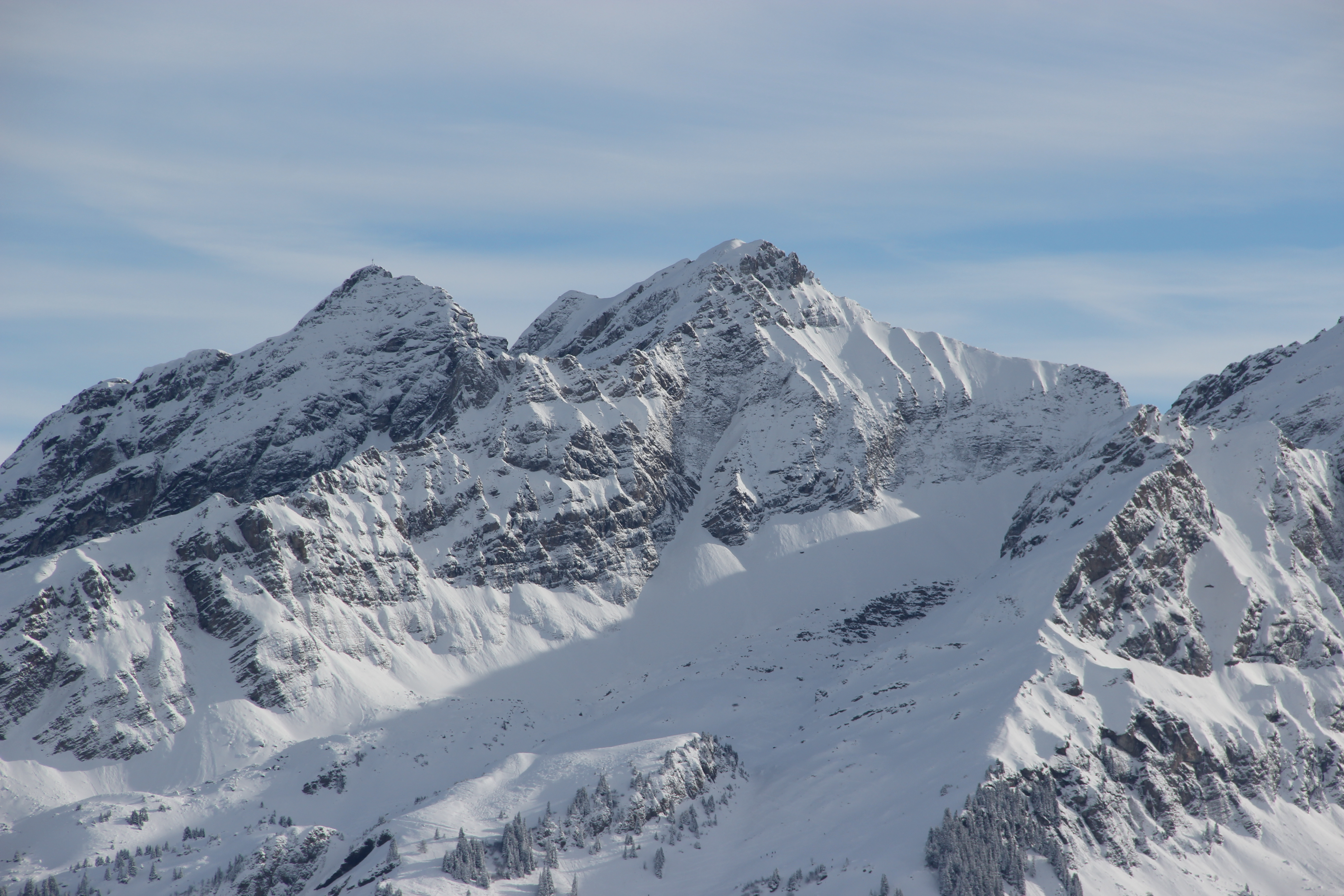
- La Para (left) and Le Tarent (center).

Highest point
- Elevation: 2,540 m (8,330 ft)
- Prominence: 90 m (300 ft)
- Parent peak: Le Tarent
- Coordinates: 46°22′58.4″N 7°9′8.4″E

Geography
- Location within Switzerland
- Location: Vaud, Switzerland
- Parent range: Bernese Alps

La Para (also named La Pare or La Tornette) is a mountain of the western Bernese Alps, overlooking Les Diablerets in the canton of Vaud.
