= Scex Rouge =

Mountain in Switzerland

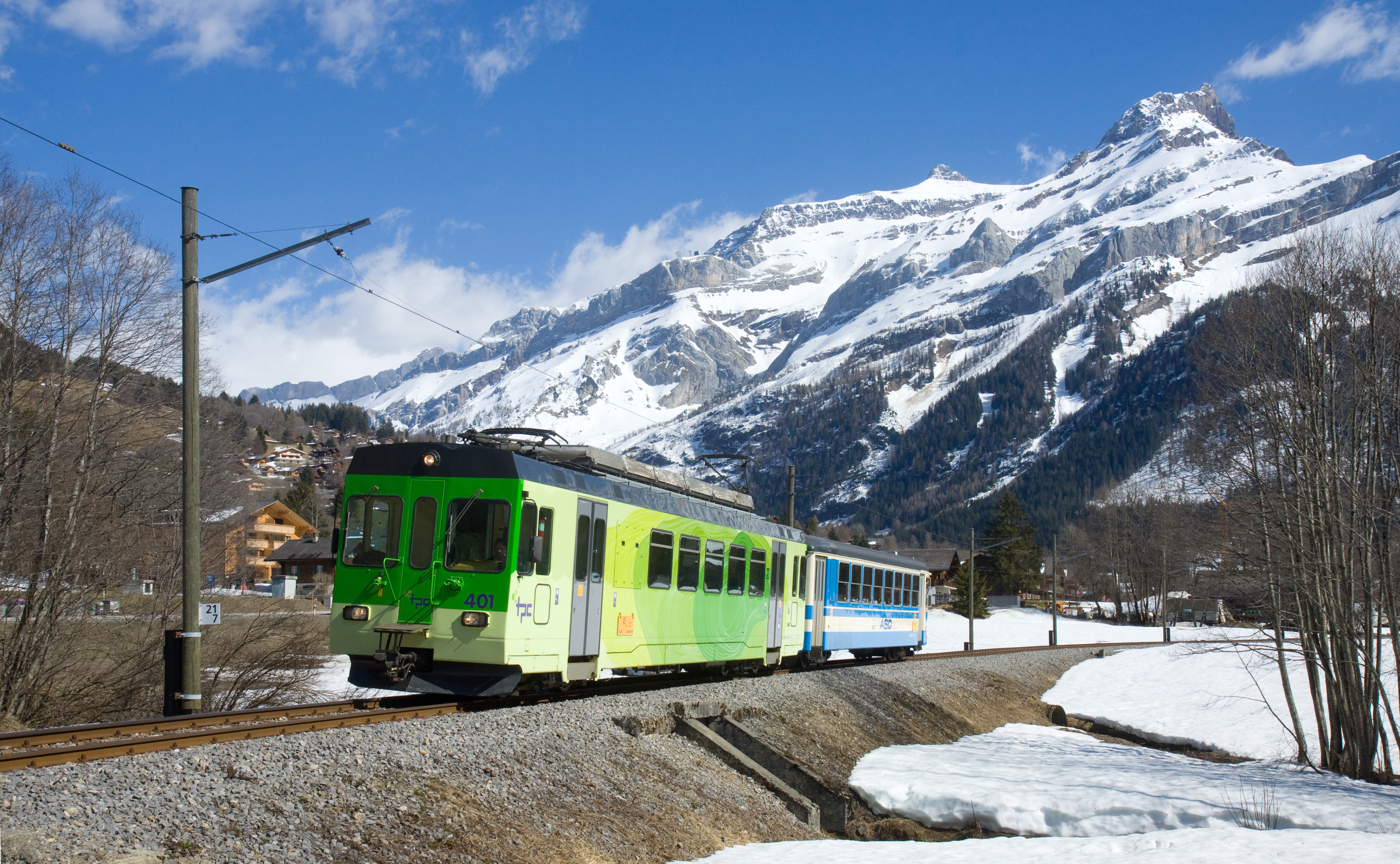
- The northwest side of the Scex Rouge (right) from the Aigle–Les Diablerets railway

Highest point
- Elevation: 2,972 m (9,751 ft)
- Prominence: 141 m (463 ft)
- Parent peak: Diablerets
- Coordinates: 46°19′38″N 7°12′09″E

Geography
- Location within Switzerland
- Location: Vaud, Switzerland
- Parent range: Bernese Alps

Climbing
- Easiest route: Pedestrian access from the station (30 m ascent)

The Scex Rouge (also spelled Sex Rouge; lit. "red rock"; 2,972 metres (9,751 ft)) is a mountain of the Alps, overlooking Les Diablerets in the canton of Vaud. Along with the Oldenhorn to the east, it is one of the main peaks of the Diablerets, a huge ice-covered mountain near the western end of the Bernese Alps, straddling the border between the cantons of Vaud, Valais, and Bern, and exceeding 3,000 metres (9,800 ft) above sea level. On its west side, the Scex Rouge is part of a nearly 2,000-metre-high (6,600 ft) amphitheatre of cliffs surrounding the Creux de Champ valley, south of Les Diablerets. On its southeast side, the Scex Rouge overlooks the Tsanfleuron Glacier, the largest in the massif. Administratively, the mountain is part of the municipality of Ormont-Dessus, which also includes Les Diablerets.

The Scex Rouge is connected from the Col du Pillon (Vaud) by two aerial tramways and from Reusch (Bern) by three, all operated by Glacier 3000. The first leads to the summit of the Tête aux Chamois (2,525 metres (8,284 ft)), which can also be reached from Reusch and Oldenegg on the Bernese side. From the Tête aux Chamois, the highest aerial tramway leads to near the summit of the Scex Rouge, or more precisely, a 2,965-metre-high (9,728 ft) subsidiary summit. The mountain station lies at an elevation of 2,940 metres (9,650 ft) and consists of a large building, designed by Mario Botta, including a panoramic restaurant.

The true summit of the Scex Rouge can only be reached by a bridge connecting it with the subsidiary peak, which is in turn connected to the station by stairs. The 107-metre-long (351 ft) so-called "suspension bridge" (without towers), called Peak Walk, is the world's first suspension bridge which connects two mountain peaks. Many of the highest Alpine summits can be seen from the top.

The area is used for winter sports from October to May, with several ski lifts being located on the Tsanfleuron Glacier. In the summer season, several hiking trails cross the glacier between the Scex Rouge, the Quille du Diable and the Oldensattel, at the foot of the Oldenhorn. The Glacier 3000 company also operates a snow coach on the glacier. Without the aerial tramways, the Scex Rouge itself can be reached by experienced hikers from Reusch via the Oldensattel or from Derborence and the Sanetsch Pass via the Quille du Diable. Two other more difficult access are from Les Diablerets via the Col de Prapio and from the Col du Pillon via the Scex Rouge Glacier.

The first connection to the Scex Rouge was inaugurated in July 1964, at the time of Expo64, the fifth Swiss national exhibition. All the facilities were entirely renewed in 2001. The true summit, however, is accessible to tourists only since October 2014, when the suspension bridge was inaugurated. The Scex Rouge remains nowadays the highest mountain of the canton with public transport access.

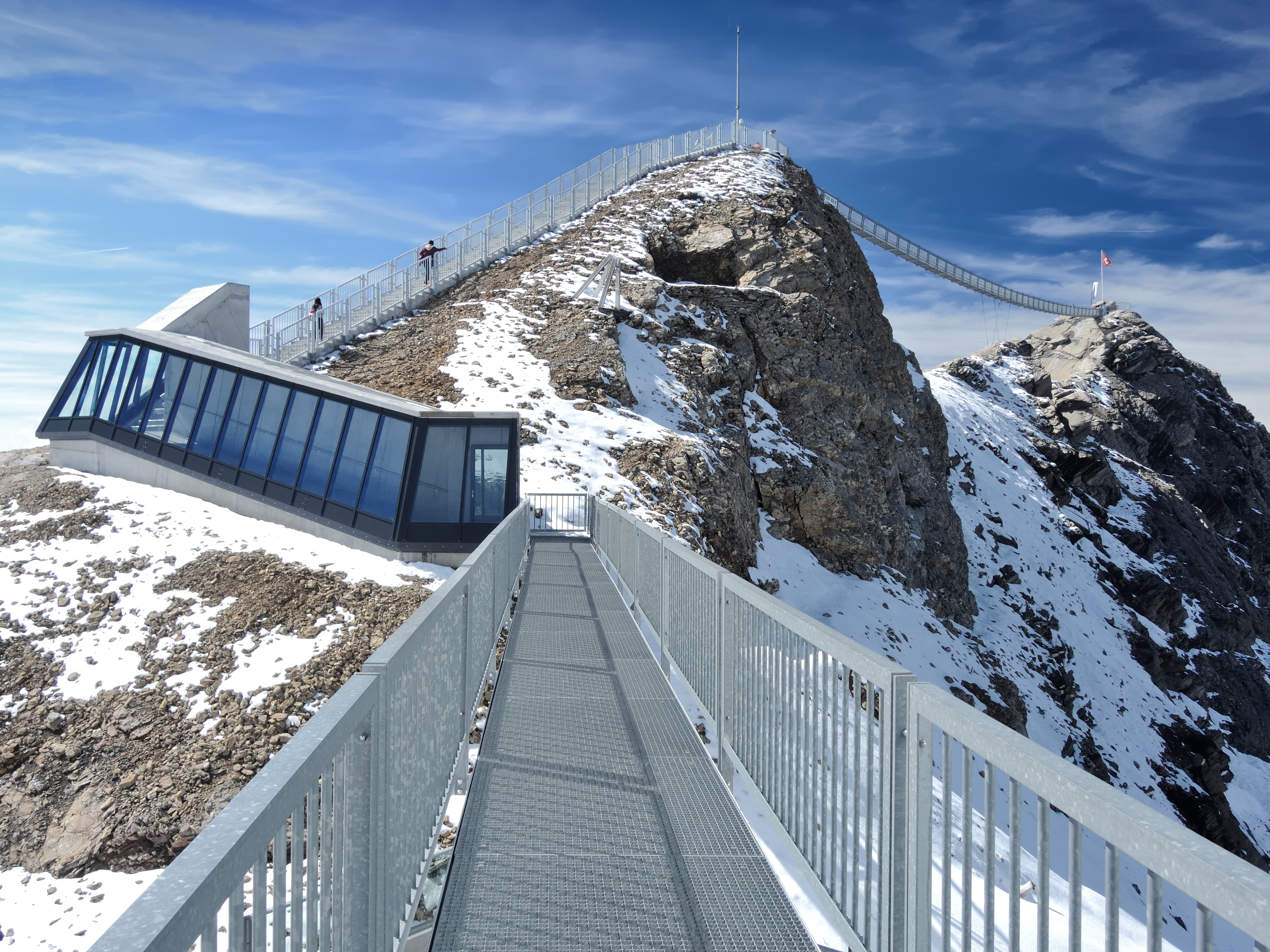
Artificial access to the summit (right), through the lower summit (centre), with snow protection and bridges.

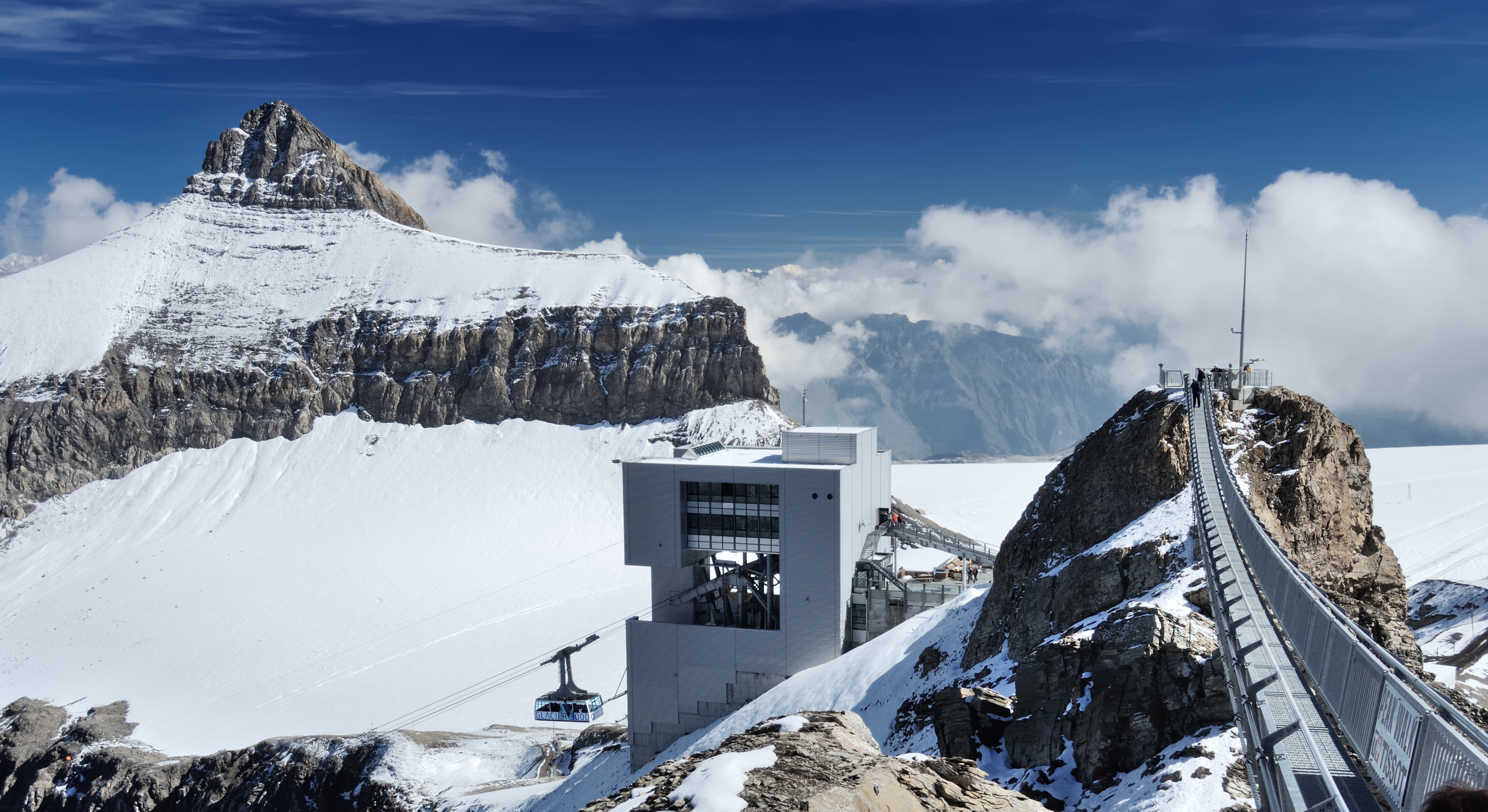
View from the summit: Oldenhorn and Tsanfleuron Glacier (background), Mario Botta station and lower summit (foreground)

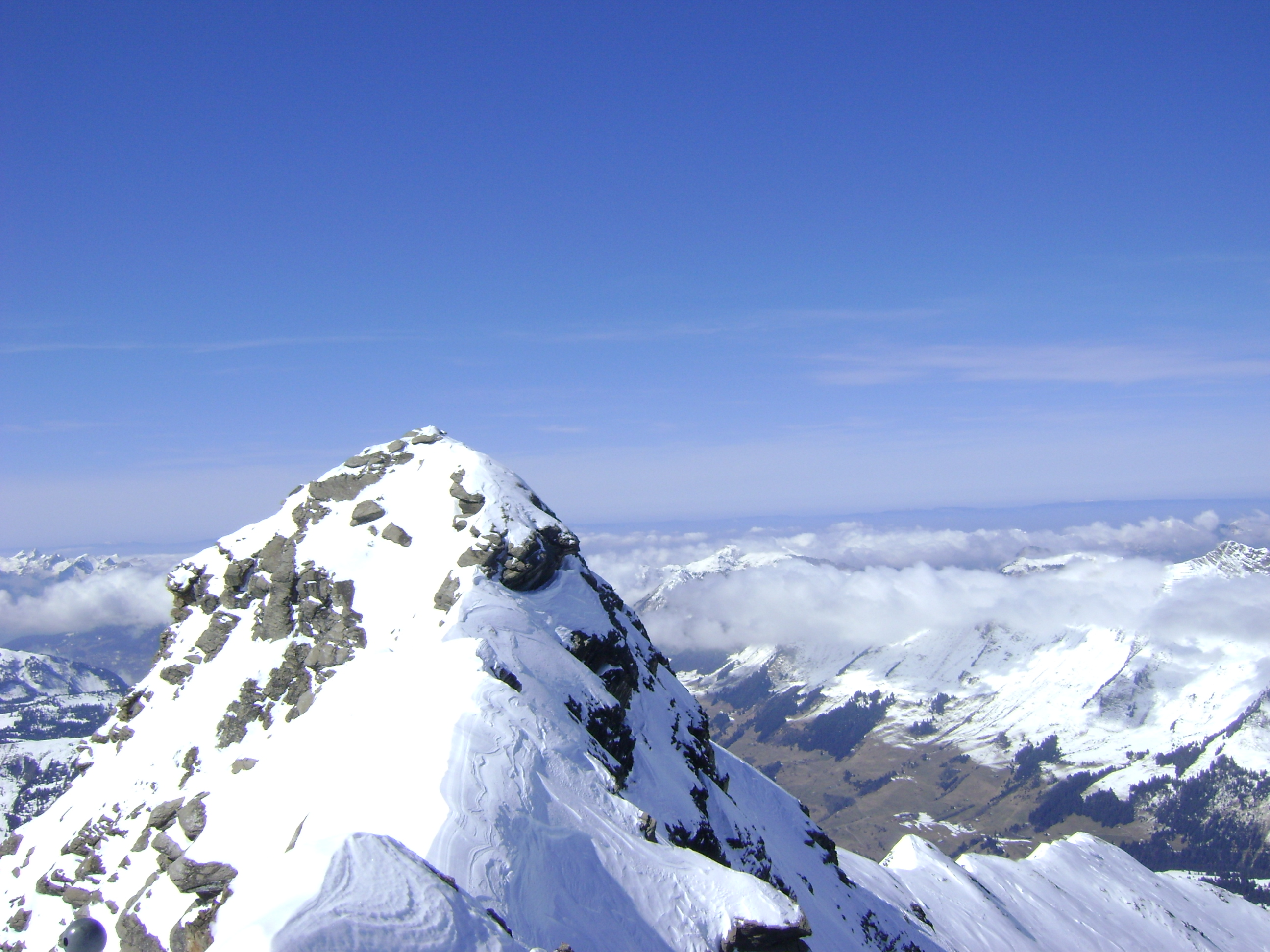
The summit prior to 2014

== See also ==
- List of mountains of Switzerland accessible by public transport
