= Col de Jable =

Mountain pass in Switzerland

- Location within Switzerland
- Elevation: 1,884 metres (6,181 ft)
- Traversed by: Trail

Third Approach
- Location: Vaud/Bern, Switzerland
- Range: Alps
- Coordinates: 46°25′38″N 07°12′00″E

The Col de Jable (1,884 m) is a mountain pass in the western Swiss Alps, connecting L'Etivaz in the canton of Vaud to Gstaad in the canton of Bern. The pass is located between the Gummfluh and the Wittenberghorn. It is traversed by a trail.

== See also ==
- List of mountain passes in Switzerland
