= Diablerets =

Mountain in Switzerland

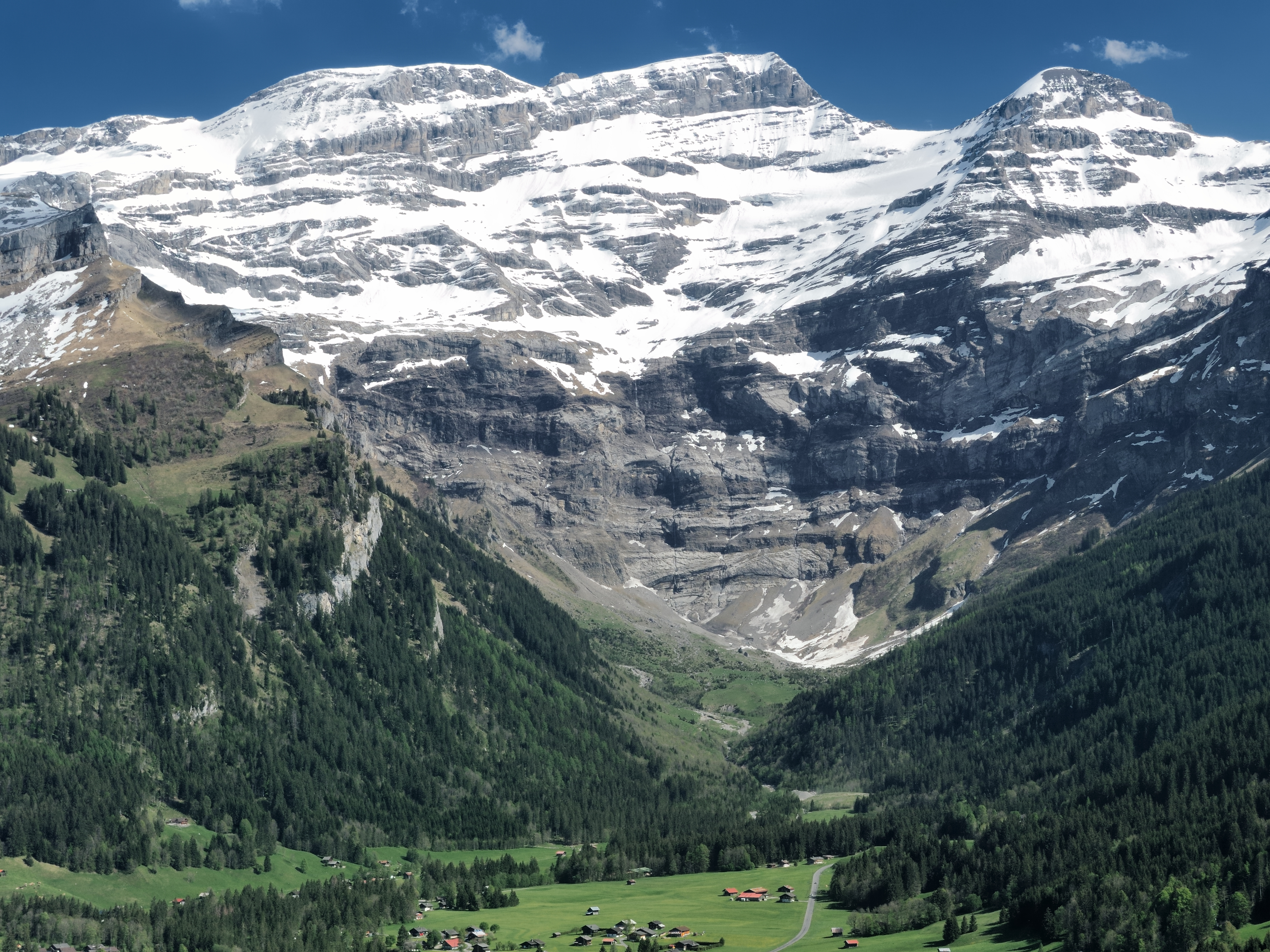
- The 2,000-metre-high north side of the Diablerets

Highest point
- Peak: Sommet des Diablerets
- Elevation: 3,216 m (10,551 ft)
- Prominence: 975 m (3,199 ft)
- Parent peak: Finsteraarhorn
- Isolation: 14.3 km (8.9 mi)
- Listing: Canton high point, Alpine mountains above 3000 m
- Coordinates: 46°18′14″N 7°11′21″E

Naming
- Native name: Les Diablerets (French)
- English translation: The Abode of Devils

Geography
- Location within Switzerland
- Country: Switzerland
- Cantons: Vaud; Valais; Bern
- Parent range: Bernese Alps
- Topo map: Swiss Federal Office of Topography swisstopo

Geology
- Mountain type: Limestone

The Diablerets (French: Les Diablerets; lit. "the abode of devils") are a huge ice-covered mountain massif of the Alps, culminating at the Sommet des Diablerets (VS) at 3,216 metres (10,551 ft) above sea level and almost straddling the border between the Swiss cantons of Vaud (VD) and Valais (VS). The northeastern part of the massif stretches also into the canton of Bern (BE).

The Diablerets massif, which consists of several peaks, extends for about 10 kilometres near the western extremity of the Bernese Alps, between the two deep passes, the Cheville Pass (2,038 m (6,686 ft)) right below the main summit to the south, and the Sanetsch/Sénin Pass (2,252 m (7,388 ft)) to the east. The mountain is covered by two distinct glaciers, the largest being the Tsanfleuron Glacier and the highest being the Diablerets Glacier.

The main summit (officially referred to as Sommet des Diablerets) is the highest point in the massif and the sud-west summit is the highest point in the canton of Vaud. In the latter canton, the mountain has given its name to the nearby village and resort of Les Diablerets, which lies on the north side of the massif. On the south side (Valais) the mountain overlooks the hamlet and valley of Derborence.

== Description ==
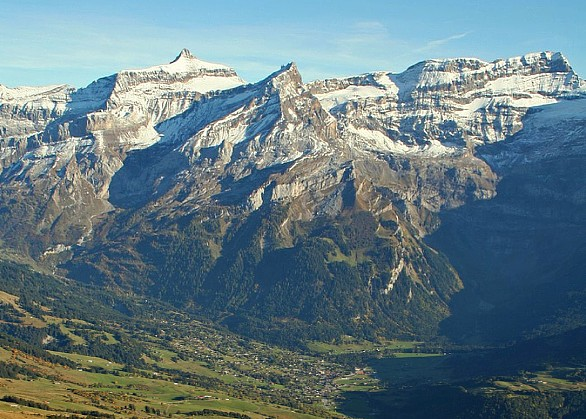
The Diablerets massif from the north including the Oldehore (left), the Scex Rouge (centre) and the main summit (right)

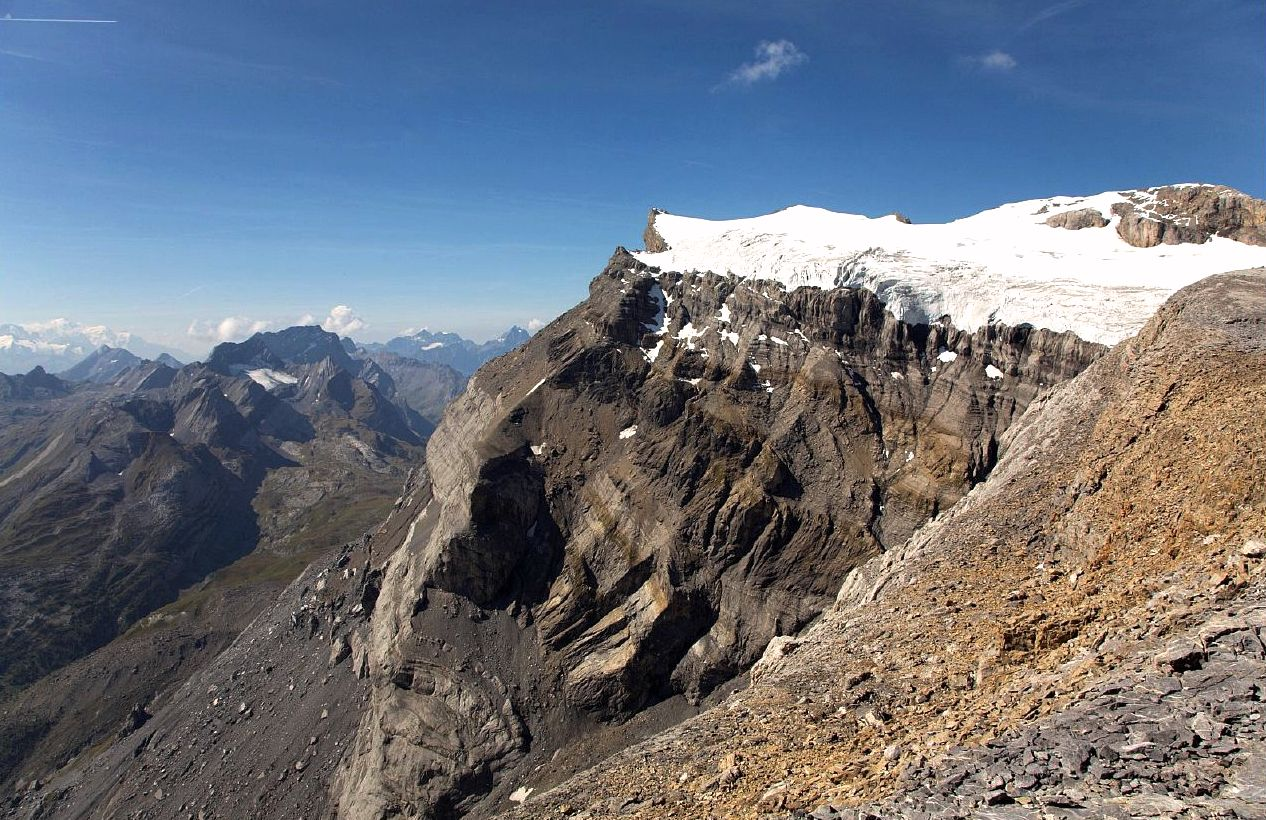
The main summit from the southeast side

Along with the Muverans, the Wildhorn and the Wildstrubel, the Diablerets are one of the four distinct and glaciated massifs of the Bernese Alps that lie between the Rhone elbow and the Gemmi Pass. The main section of the mountain, between the cantons of Vaud and Valais, is part of the Rhone basin, through the rivers Grande Eau (north) and Lizerne (south). The easternmost part of the massif, that lies in the canton of Bern, is part of the Rhine basin, through the river Sarine (French, Saane in German). The Oldehore (Swiss German, Germanized: Oldenhorn) is the tripoint of the three cantons of Vaud, Valais and Bern, and several of the peaks have a German as well as a French name.

The main peaks of the massif are, from west to east: the Culan (VD, 2,789 m (9,150 ft)) at the western end of the massif, the Tête Ronde (VD, 3,037 m (9,964 ft)) approximately 800 meters west of the main summit, the Sommet des Diablerets (main summit), Le Dôme (VS, 2,986 m (9,797 ft)) east of the main summit and between the two glaciers, the Sex Rouge (also called Scex Rouge; VD, 2,971 m (9,747 ft)) and the Oldehorn/Becca d'Audon (VD, BE, VS; 3,123 m (10,246 ft)) across the Tsanfleuron Glacier, and the Sentschore/Mont Brun (BE, VS; 2,924 m (9,593 ft)) further to the northeast. Also notable is the tower-like peak of the Quille du Diable ("devil's skittle," also known as Tour St-Martin; VS, 2,908 m (9,541 ft)) that overlooks Derborence from the edge of the Tsanfleuron plateau.

The two largest glaciers on the massif (Tsanfleuron and Diablerets) are both on the Valais side. They form a single inclined plane towards the east, although they are separated by the rocky summit of Le Dôme (2,986 m), which lies just east of the main summit. They are not very steep, especially the Tsanfleuron Glacier, as the rock strata are close to horizontal. The smaller and higher Diablerets Glacier, however, is much wilder than the Tsanfleuron Glacier as it is steeper and more crevassed. The Tsanfleuron plateau, between Le Dôme and the Sanetsch Pass is only partly glaciated. Below 2,600 m is a large karst zone, called Lapis de Tsanfleuron and covering an area of about 8 square kilometres (3.1 sq mi).

Along with the Culan, the Tête Ronde, and the Scex Rouge, the main summit forms an amphitheatre of limestone cliffs with numerous water falls, surrounding the valley of Creux de Champ and overlooking the village of Les Diablerets from a height of over 2,000 metres. The height of the north wall is about 1,600 metres, its bottom (named Rochers de Champ) lying at 1,600 metres.

As with other mountains on the crest of the Bernese Alps, the slopes of the Diablerets experience different types of climate depending on their location: the northern slopes are cooler and wetter while the southern slopes are drier and warmer. Forests are found up to 1,900 metres on the north side and up to 2,000 metres on the south side. Further south in Valais, on the slopes of Mont Gond, vineyards are also very common below 1000 metres, but completely absent on the north side. There, alpine pastures dominate the landscape, as in many other areas of the northern Alpine foothills.

== Tourism and climbing ==
Since 1964, an aerial tramway connects the Scex Rouge from the Col du Pillon, 4 kilometres east of the village of Les Diablerets. The Tsanfleuron Glacier, easily accessible from the Scex Rouge mountain station, has then become part of a large ski area with several ski lifts on it, culminating at nearly 3,000 metres, that goes by the commercial name of Glacier 3000. The area is also popular in summer for the snow hikes on the glacier. The summits of Le Dôme and Oldenhorn can be reached in a few hours from the station. The Peak Walk, a 107 m suspension bridge to Scex Rouge from the peak at the top of the lift station, was constructed as a tourist attraction in 2014.

The main summit, although not very distant from the Scex Rouge station, can not be easily reached as it involves the crossing of the much-crevassed Diablerets Glacier, though it is accessible to more intrepid hikers.

Administratively, le Sommet des Diablerets is shared between the municipalities of Conthey (VS), Ormont-Dessus and Bex (VD).

== See also ==
- List of mountains of Vaud
- List of mountains of Valais
- List of mountains of Switzerland
- List of most isolated mountains of Switzerland
