= Etang de Trente Pas =

Lake in Valais, Switzerland

- Location within Canton of Valais Location within Switzerland Location within Alps
- Interactive map of Etang de Trente Pas
- Location: Valais
- Coordinates: 46°17′18″N 7°16′52″E
- Basin countries: Switzerland
- Surface elevation: 2,196 m (7,205 ft)

Etang de Trente Pas is a small lake and bog below Mont Gond (2709 m), above Conthey, in Valais, Switzerland.

A literal translation of its name is "Pond of 30 steps". The unit of measure "pas" equaled about 60 centimeters.
