= Quille du Diable =

Mountain in Switzerland

- Tour St-Martin
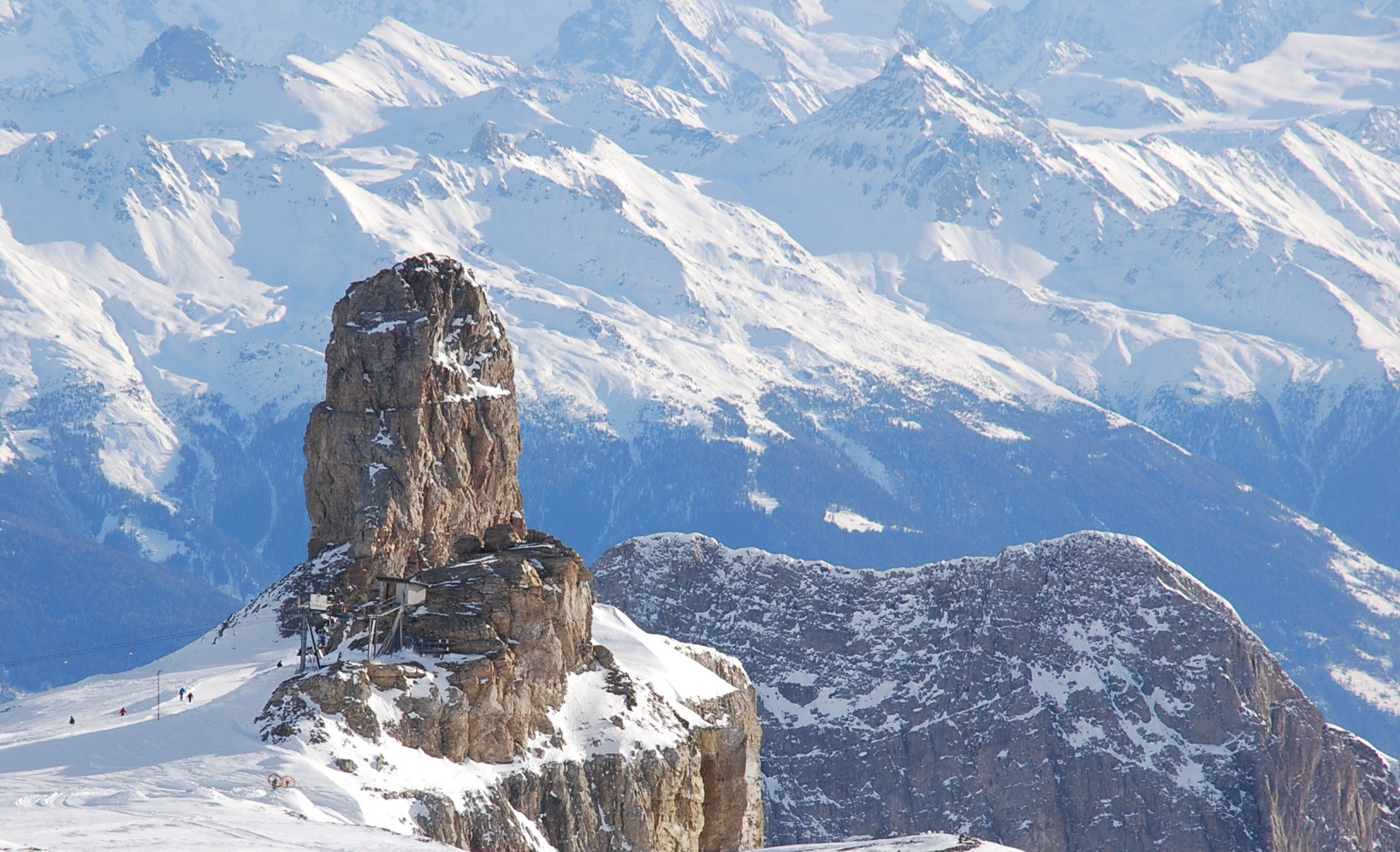
- The west side of the Quille du Diable

Highest point
- Elevation: 2,908 m (9,541 ft)
- Prominence: 53 m (174 ft)
- Parent peak: Diablerets
- Coordinates: 46°18′34″N 07°13′29″E

Naming
- English translation: Devil's skittle, Saint Martin's Tower
- Language of name: French

Geography
- Location within Switzerland
- Country: Switzerland
- Canton: Valais
- Parent range: Bernese Alps
- Topo map: Swiss Federal Office of Topography swisstopo

The Quille du Diable (lit. "devil's skittle"; also known as Tour St-Martin) is a peak of the Diablerets massif, located on the border of the municipalities of Conthey and Savièse in the canton of Valais. It lies on the edge of the high Tsanfleuron Glacier plateau and overlooks the valley around of Derborence 1,500 metres (4,900 ft) lower.

At the foot of the Quille du Diable is the restaurant Refuge l'Espace. It can be reached by crossing the Tsanfleuron Glacier from the Scex Rouge mountain station.
