= Diablerets Glacier =

Glacier in Bernese Alps, Switzerland

- French: Glacier des Diablerets
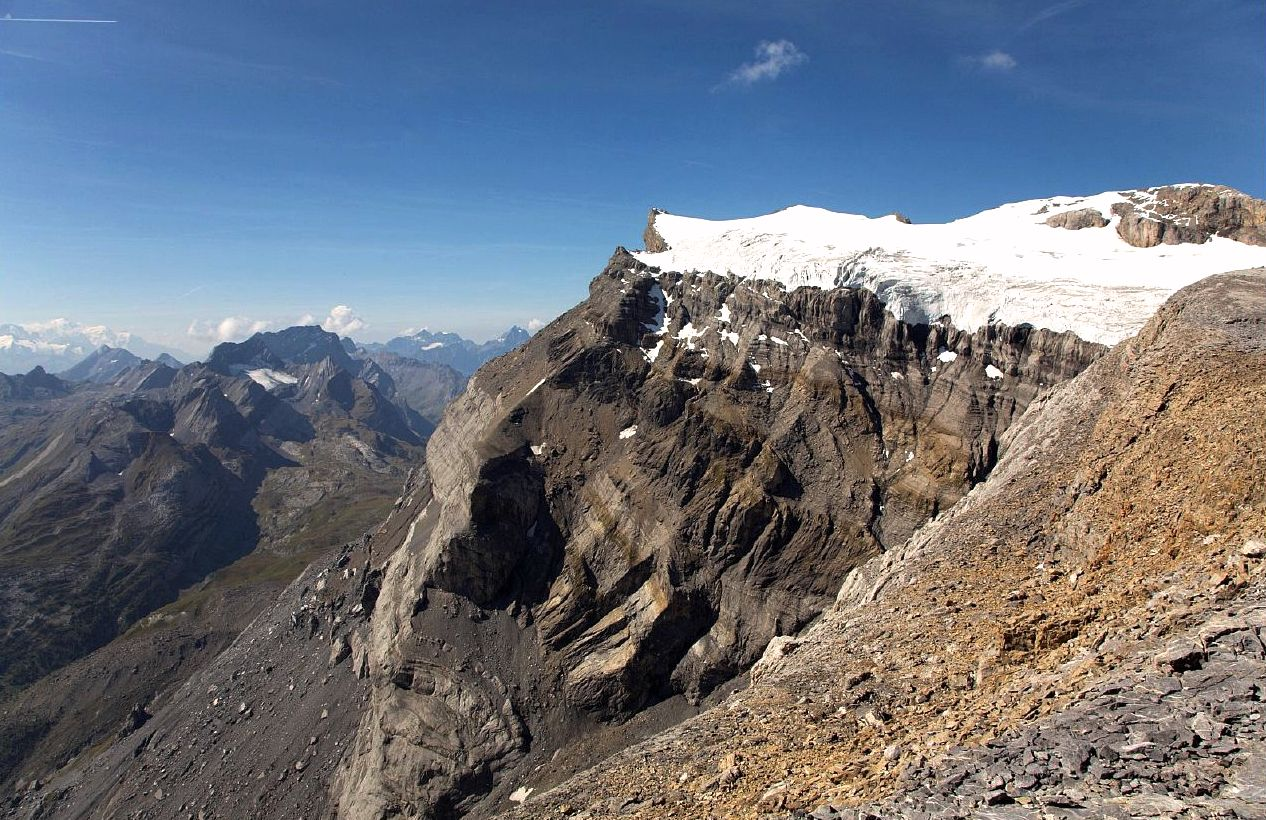
- Glacier over the south wall of Les Diablerets
- Interactive map of Diablerets Glacier
- Type: Ice cap
- Location: Valais, Switzerland
- Coordinates: 46°18′16″N 7°11′26″E

The Diablerets Glacier (French: Glacier des Diablerets) is a glacier situated on the summit of Les Diablerets in the Bernese Alps. It covers an area of approximatively 1 km^{2}.

The Diablerets Glacier is often confused with the nearby much larger and popular Tsanfleuron Glacier.
