= Tsanfleuron Glacier =

Glacier in western Bernese Alps, Switzerland

- French: Glacier de Tsanfleuron
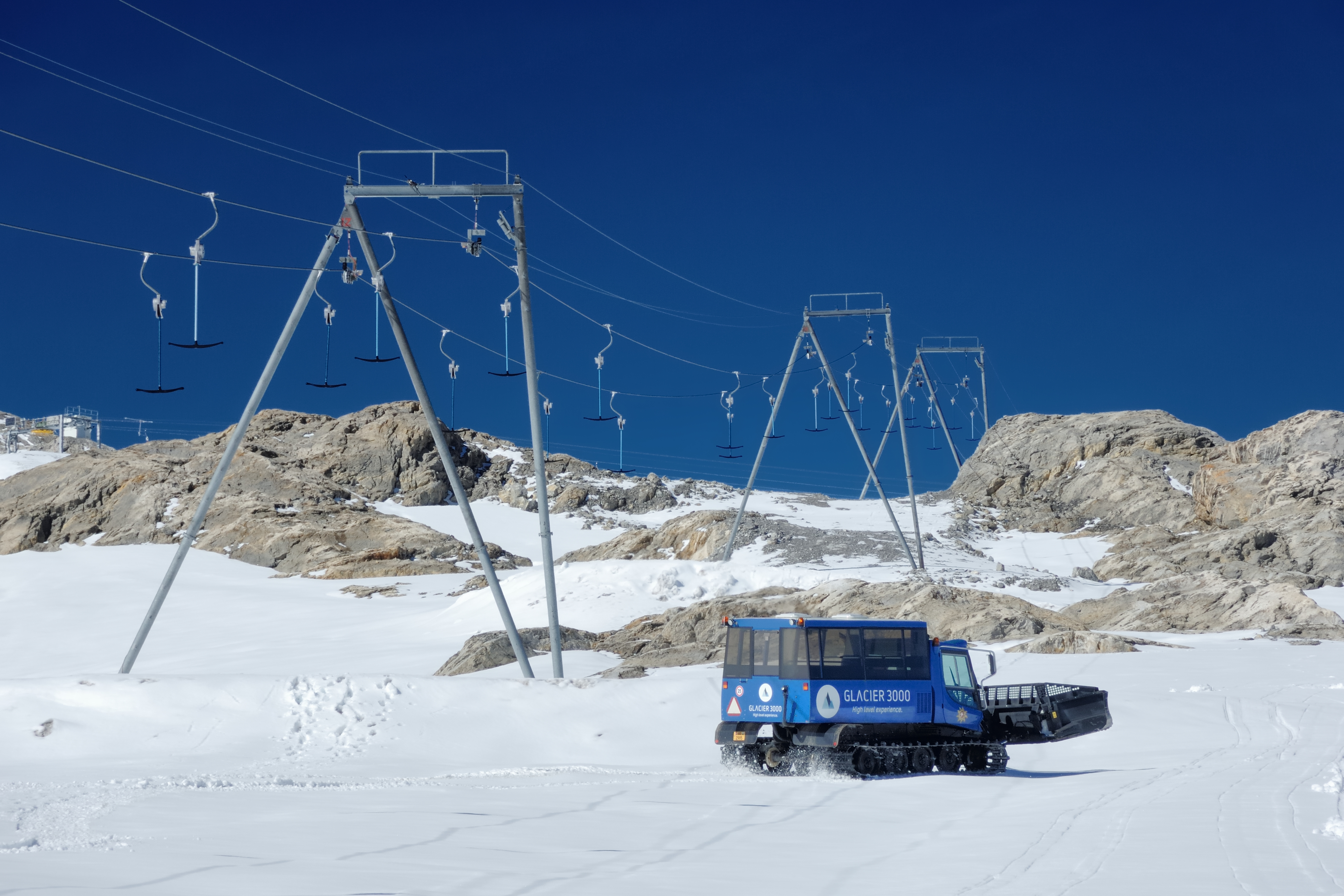
- Summer view from the Tsanfleuron skiflit towards the Dôme
- Interactive map of Tsanfleuron Glacier
- Location: Switzerland
- Coordinates: 46°19′8″N 7°13′21″E
- Length: 3.5 km

The Tsanfleuron Glacier (French: Glacier de Tsanfleuron, German: Tsanfleurongletscher) is a 3.5 km (2.2 mi) long glacier (2005) situated in the western Bernese Alps in the cantons of Valais and Vaud in Switzerland. In 1973 it had an area of 3.81 km^{2} (1.47 sq mi). It culminates at the Dôme, at approximately 3,000 metres above sea level, where it is separated from the Diablerets Glacier. The lowest point is at approx. 2,500 metres. The glacier is overlooked by the Scex Rouge and the Oldenhorn on the north, and by the Quille du Diable on the south.

Most of the glacier is used as a ski area and is better known under the name of the company operating the ski area Glacier 3000 or Glacier des Diablerets (the latter is in fact a nearby smaller glacier on the summit of the Diablerets). The area can be reached easily from the Scex Rouge station with the help of a chairlift. Several secured paths allow pedestrians to walk on the glacier. Snow buses are also operated on the glacier.

== History ==
In July 2017, the remains of a Swiss couple who had gone missing in 1942 were discovered on the Tsanfleuron Glacier. Their bodies and personal belongings were revealed as the glacier receded, having been preserved in the ice for 75 years. According to a 2018 Swissinfo report, the glacier had retreated by approximately half a kilometre since 1960.

In 2021, researchers from the University of Lausanne conducted ground-penetrating radar (GPR) surveys on the Tsanfleuron Glacier using both sled-based and drone-mounted systems to measure ice thickness, particularly near the Tsanfleuron Pass, which connects it to the Scex-Rouge Glacier. They found that in some areas the ice was only about 3.5 metres thick, indicating an imminent separation. In the summer of 2022, following an unusually warm season, the two glaciers became physically disconnected, exposing the Tsanfleuron Pass for the first time in over 2,000 years. The pass had been continuously covered by ice since at least the Roman era and was expected to be entirely ice-free by the end of that summer.

== See also ==
- List of glaciers in Switzerland
- Swiss Alps
