= Culan (mountain) =

Mountain in Switzerland

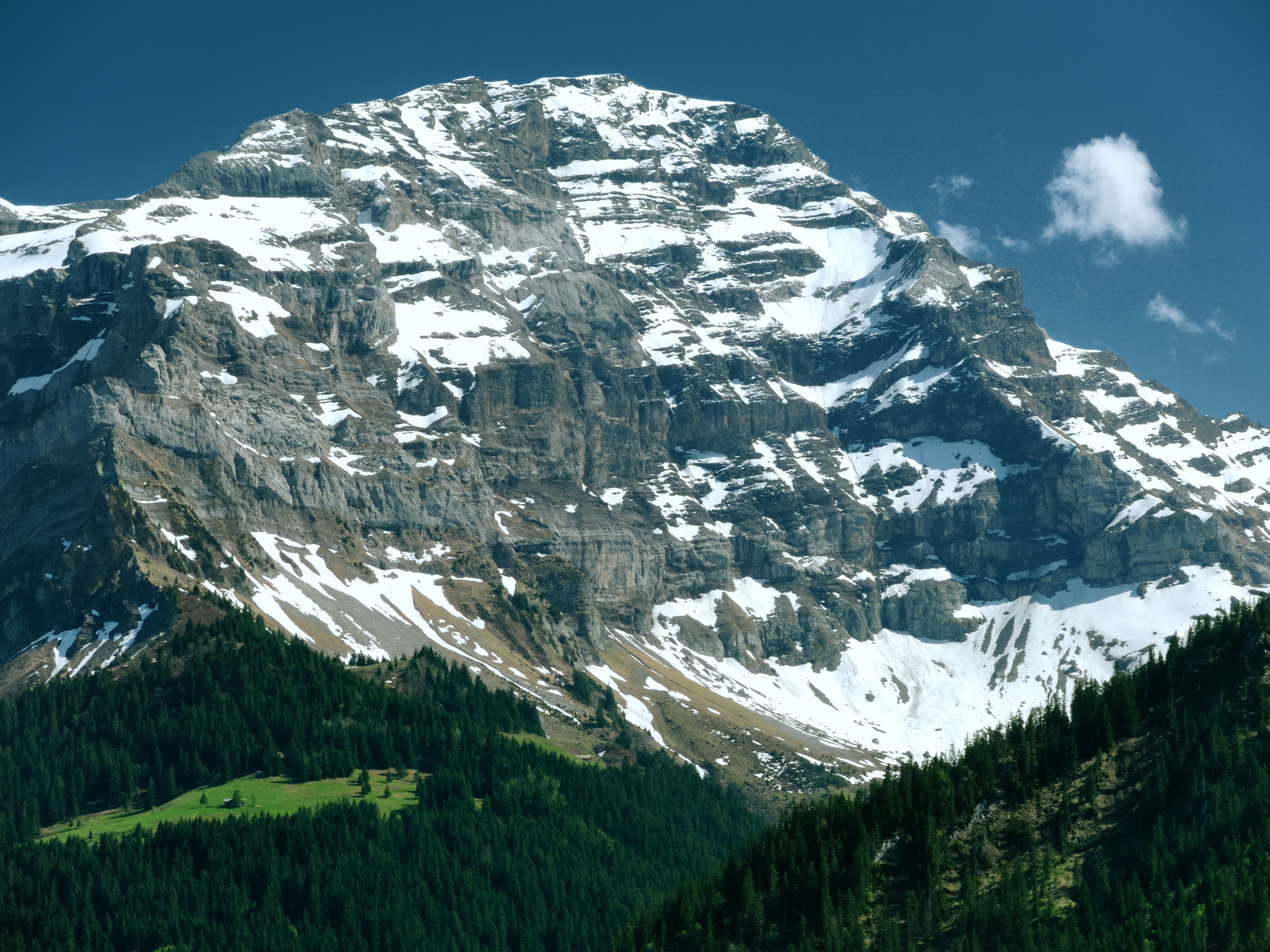
- North face

Highest point
- Elevation: 2,789 m (9,150 ft)
- Prominence: 113 m (371 ft)
- Parent peak: Diablerets
- Coordinates: 46°18′16.7″N 7°9′23.2″E

Geography
- Location within Switzerland
- Location: Vaud, Switzerland
- Parent range: Bernese Alps

The Culan is a mountain of the Bernese Alps, overlooking the Col de la Croix in the Swiss canton of Vaud. It lies approximately 3 kilometres (2 mi) west of the Diablerets summit.
