= Glacier 3000 =

Swiss ski lift company

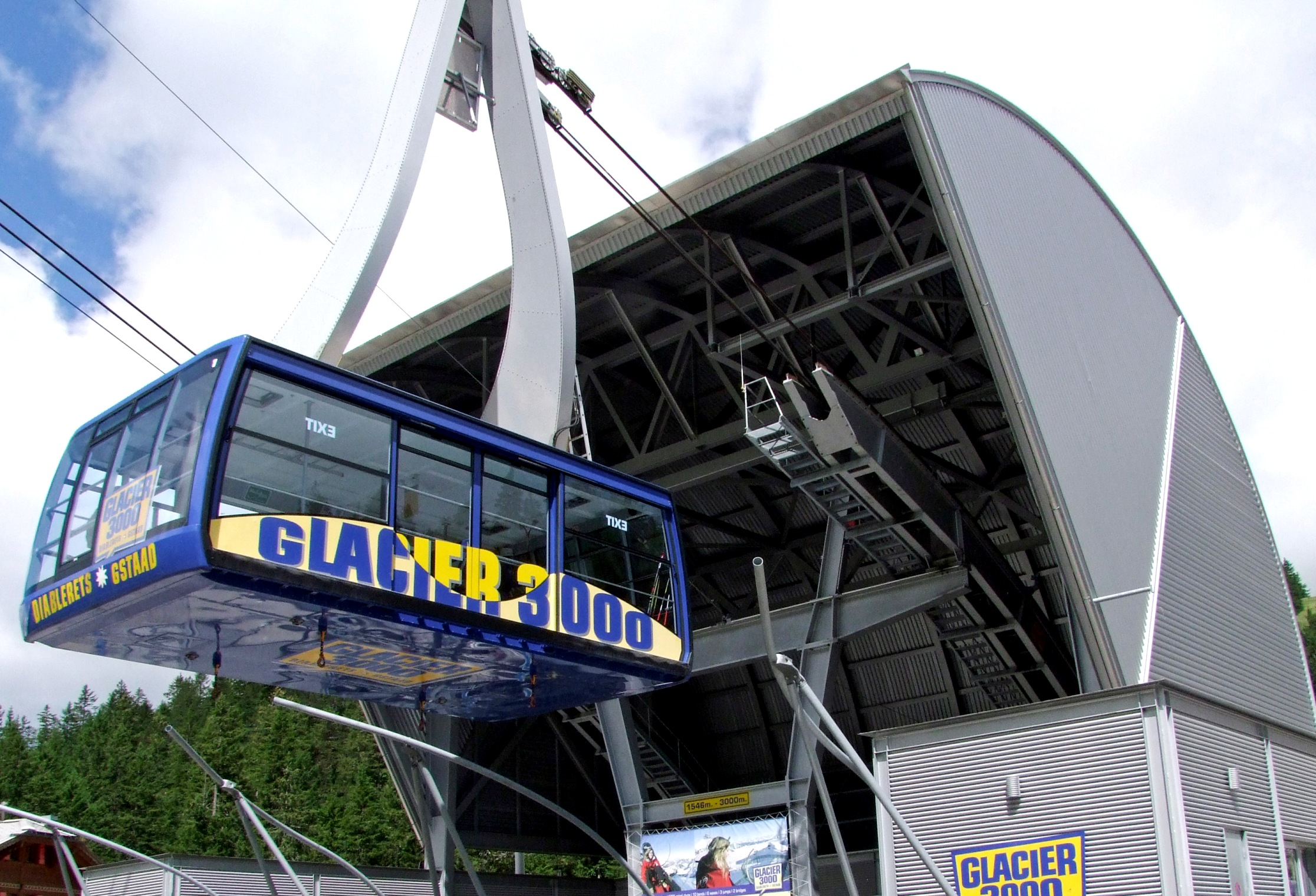
The station at the Col du Pillon

Glacier 3000 (officially Gstaad 3000 AG) is a company that operates several cable cars. It was created in 2005 and took over the assets of the then bankrupt Glacier 3000 Région Les Diablerets-Gstaad S.A., founded in 1993. The company is now based in Gstaad (Switzerland).

The main cable car was opened in 1964 and rebuilt in 1999. It connects the Col du Pillon (1,546) from the Scex Rouge (2,950 m). The company also operates ski lifts on the Tsanfleuron Glacier and a suspension bridge, called the Peak Walk by Tissot, that connects a viewpoint with Scex Rouge. In 2005 the rights to Glacier 3000 were bought by a triumvirate of the French businessman Jean Claude Mimran, the British businessman and Formula One Executive Bernie Ecclestone, and the local Swiss property developer Marcel Bach.
