= Derborence =

Hamlet in Conthey, Valais, Switzerland

Coordinates: 46°16′47″N 7°12′53″E

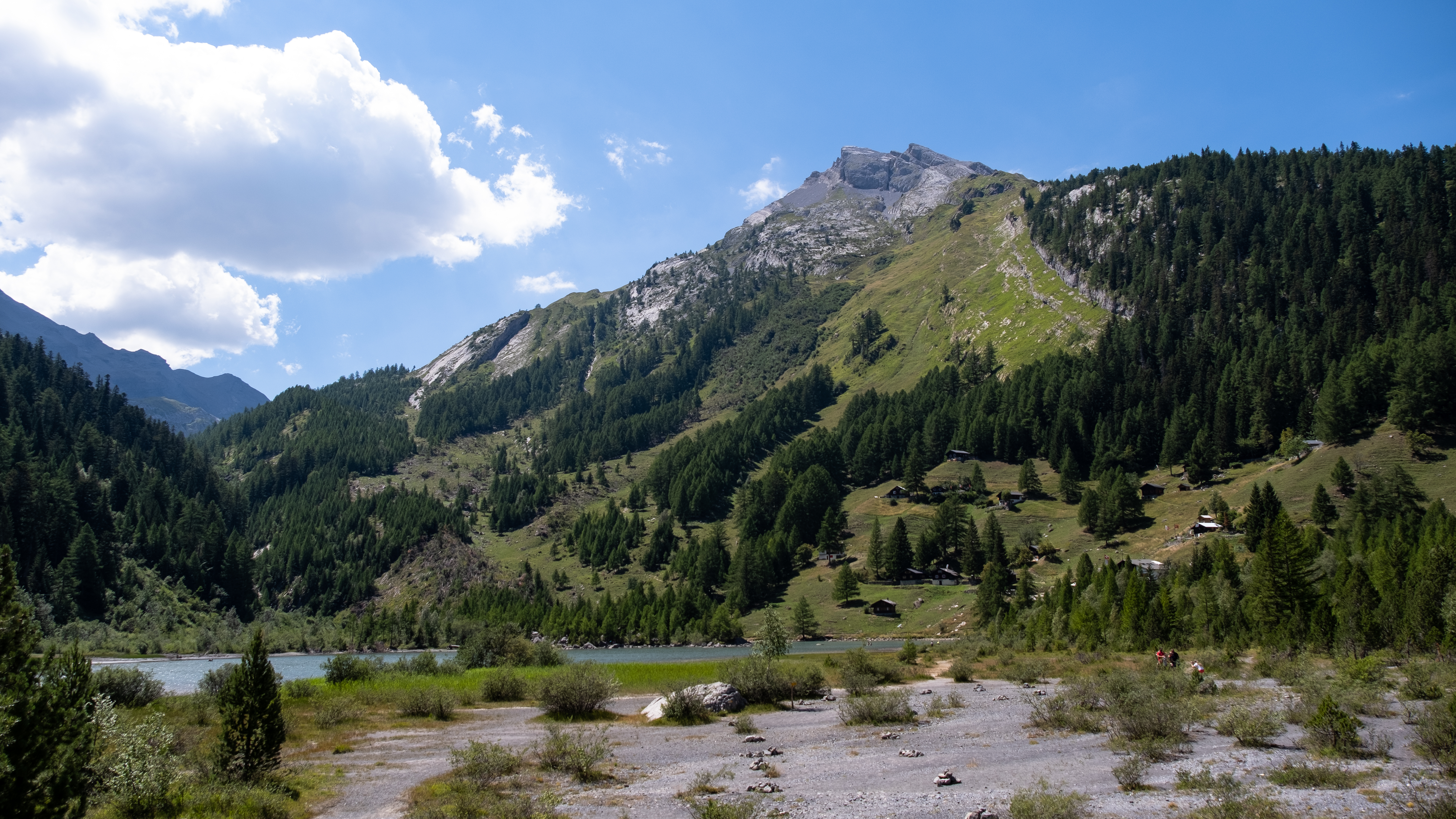
Derborence above the lake

Derborence is a hamlet in the municipality of Conthey, in the canton of Valais, in Switzerland. It is located at 1,450 metres in an isolated valley on the south side of the Bernese Alps and is not permanently inhabited. Derborence is completely surrounded by mountains: The Diablerets (highest) on the north, Haut de Cry on the south and Mont Gond on the east. Derborence can be reached by a road from Conthey, or by foot from Gryon, using the Pas de Cheville.

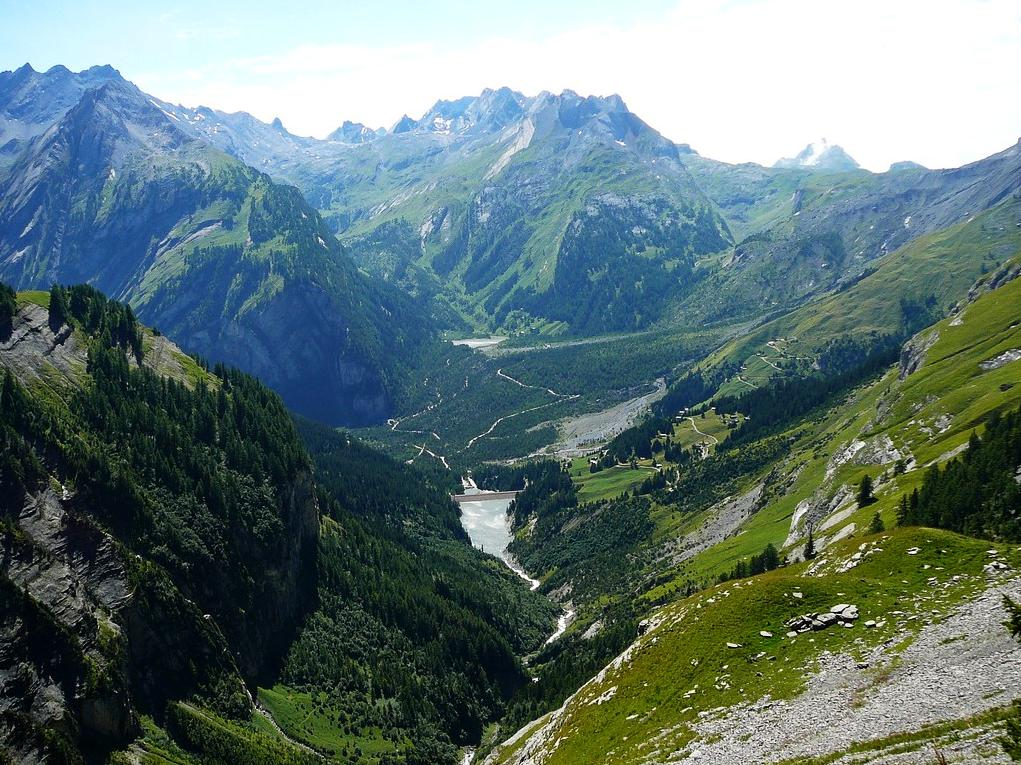
Valley of Derborence

Lake Derborence was formed in 1749 after two landslides coming from the south wall of the Diablerets. Thousands of tons of rock came crashing down from a height of 1900 metres in 1714 and 1749, coming to 400 metres below and forming a 2 kilometre-long natural barrier which gradually filled with water. A virgin forest grew on the rock debris. It consists of spruce, pine, larch, scots pine, beech and willows. The area was acquired by Pro Natura in 1961 and is now protected.

The valley, which is exceptionally rich in fauna, is a natural habitat for ibex, chamois, deer, marmots and hares and several bird species including the owl, golden eagle, bearded vulture and alpine chough.
