= Les Diablerets =

Village and ski resort in Ormont-Dessus, Vaud, Switzerland

Coordinates: 46°21′05″N 7°09′29″E

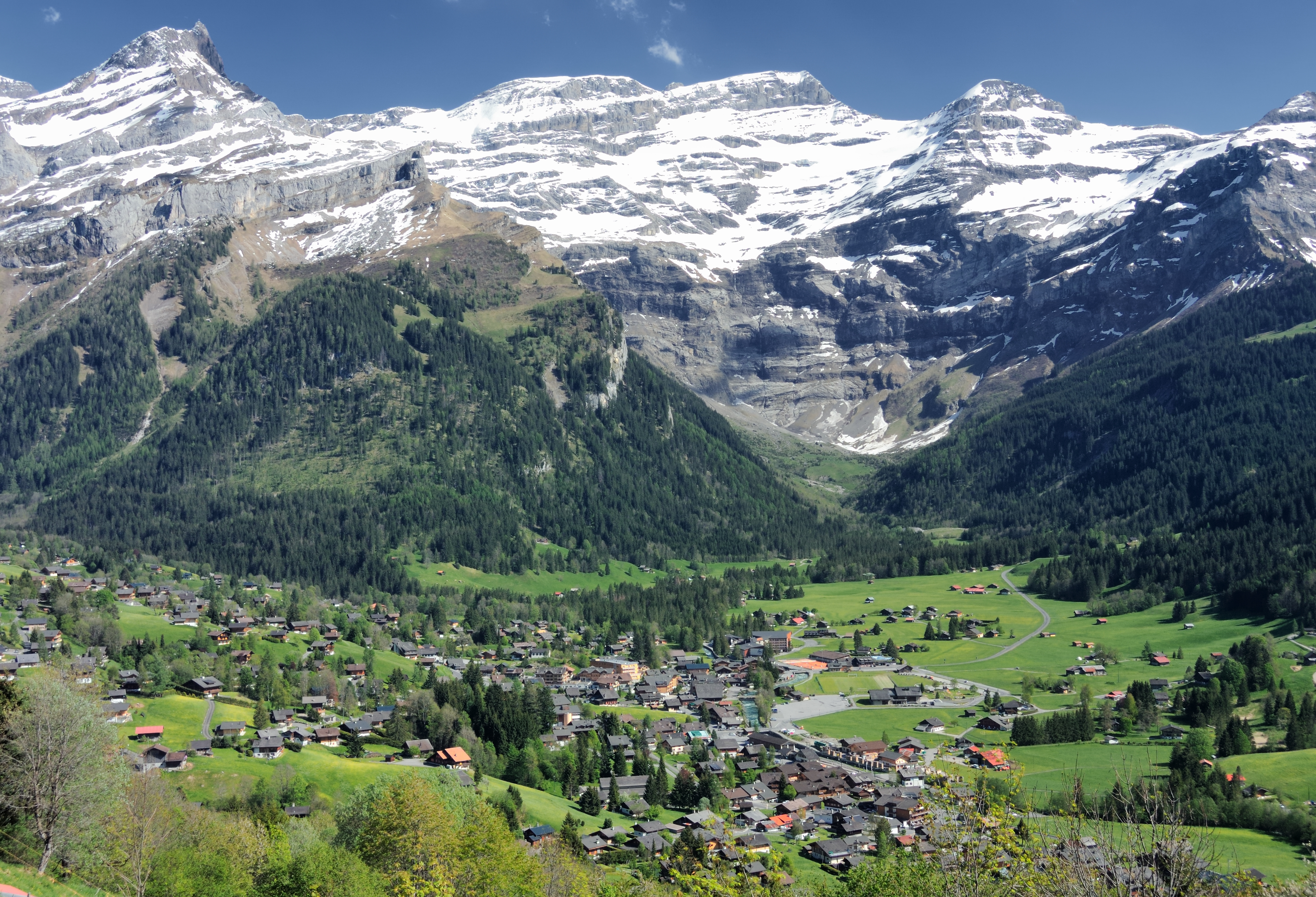
Les Diablerets with the massif of the Diablerets

Les Diablerets is a village and ski resort located in the municipality of Ormont-Dessus in the canton of Vaud, Switzerland.

The village lies at an altitude of 1,200 metres (3,900 ft) on the north side of the massif of the Diablerets, 3,210 metres (10,530 ft), in the Swiss Alps. It can be accessed via the R71 train on the Aigle–Sépey–Diablerets railway line or by road from Aigle. The Col du Pillon (1,546 m) on the east give access to the Bernese Oberland region and is the lowest station of the Glacier 3000 cable car.

The resort has a ski school, hotels and a small town centre. Les Diablerets is known for its traditional mountain architecture.

Les Diablerets is home to the Diablerets Alpine Centre (DAC), an official Swiss Ski alpine training and performance centre. Founded in 2020, the DAC is a legacy project of the 2020 Winter Youth Olympic Games.

== Skiing ==
Les Diablerets has three main ski areas:

- Scex Rouge (marketed as Glacier 3000) consists of beginner and intermediate slopes at its highest altitudes with more challenging pistes such as Martisburg further down the mountain. Glacier 3000 is also home to the infamous Combe d'Audon which sweeps past the summit of Oldehorn (3,122m) and drops down to the valley below at Reusch. Aside from skiing, Glacier 3000 is home to "Peak Walk by Tissot" – the only peak to peak suspension bridge in the world, the Alpine Coaster and Dog Sled trips.
- The Isenau sector was known for wide, sweeping slopes suitable for beginners and the sector's all-day sunshine ensured its popularity. As well as pistes at the top of the area there is a run down to the village and a long run down to the Col du Pillon – the first station of the Glacier 3000 cable car. In 2017 the slopes were closed after the failure of a tether to renew the old cable car system. In 2020 the association Isenau360 was set up with the aim of restoring the ski resort.
- The Meilleret area is on the slopes to the south east of the village. The area is Diablerets' connection to the extensive Villars/Gryon/Diablerets ski area. Meilleret has the longest sledge run in Europe from its summit down to the village via the Col de la Croix. The slopes of Meilleret hosted the alpine skiing events of the 2020 Winter Youth Olympics.

== Other events ==
Les Diablerets has hosted the Les Diablerets Film Festival every year since 1969.
