= Ormont-Dessus =

- Municipality
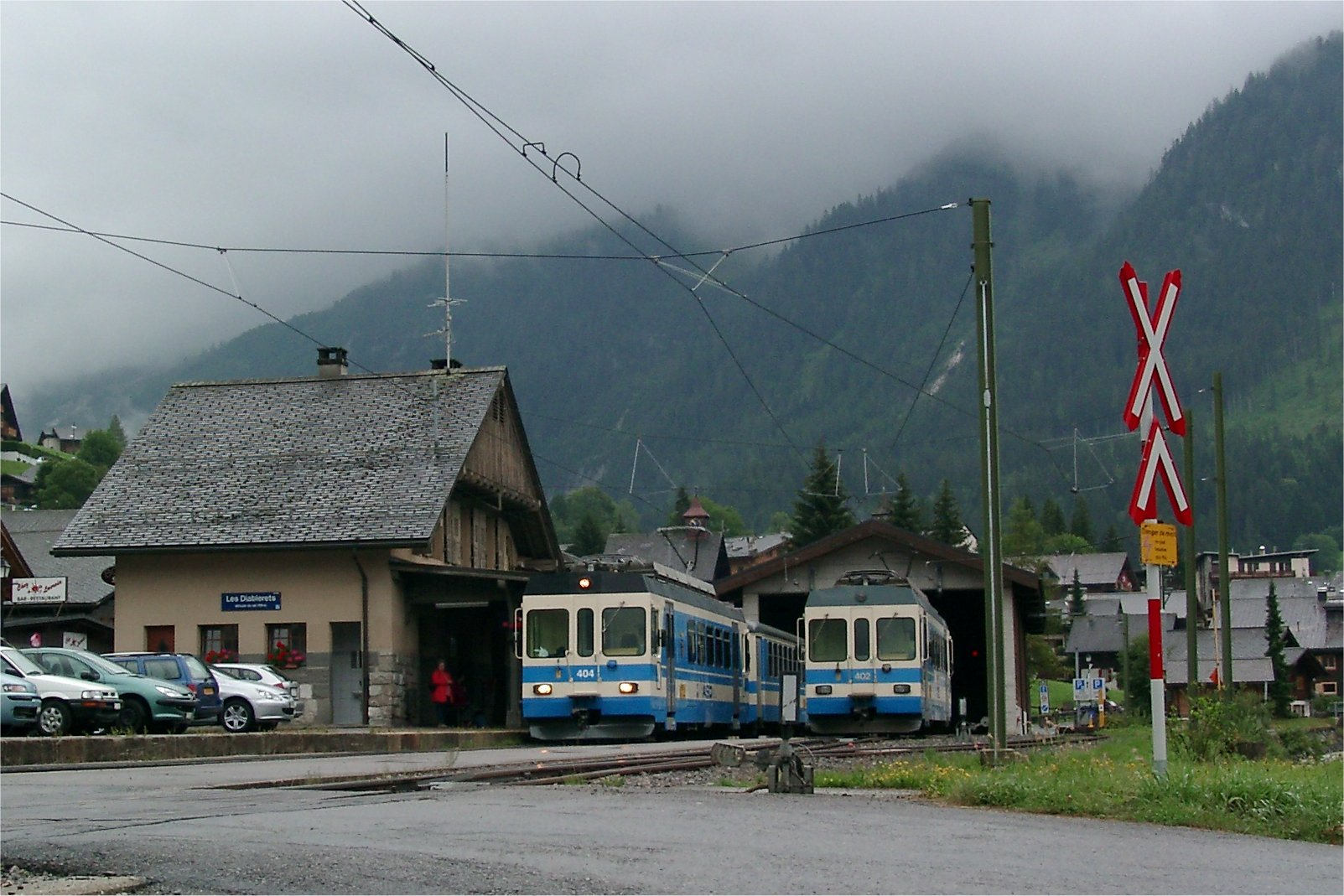
- Les Diablerets station

- Flag Coat of arms
- Location of Ormont-Dessus
- Location within Switzerland Location within Canton of Vaud
- Coordinates: 46°21′N 7°09′E
- Country: Switzerland
- Canton: Vaud
- District: Aigle

Government
  - Mayor: Syndic

Area
  - Total: 61.65 km^{2} (23.80 sq mi)
- Elevation: 1,128 m (3,701 ft)
- Highest elevation (Les Diablerets): 3,209 m (10,528 ft)
- Lowest elevation: 1,094 m (3,589 ft)

Population (December 2006)
  - Total: 1,440
  - Density: 23.4/km^{2} (60.5/sq mi)
- Demonym: Les Ormonans
- Time zone: UTC+01:00 (CET)
  - Summer (DST): UTC+02:00 (CEST)
- Postal code: 1865
- SFOS number: 5411
- ISO 3166 code: CH-VD
- Localities: Vers l'Eglise, village of Les Diablerets, Le Rosex, Les Aviolats
- Surrounded by: Bex, Château-d'Œx, Conthey (VS), Gryon, Gsteig bei Gstaad (BE), Ollon, Ormont-Dessous, Savièse (VS)
- Website: ormont-dessus.ch

Ormont-Dessus is a municipality of the canton of Vaud in Switzerland, located in the district of Aigle.

== History ==
Ormont-Dessus is first mentioned in 1200 as Ormont. The German name of Ormund is no longer used.

== Geography ==
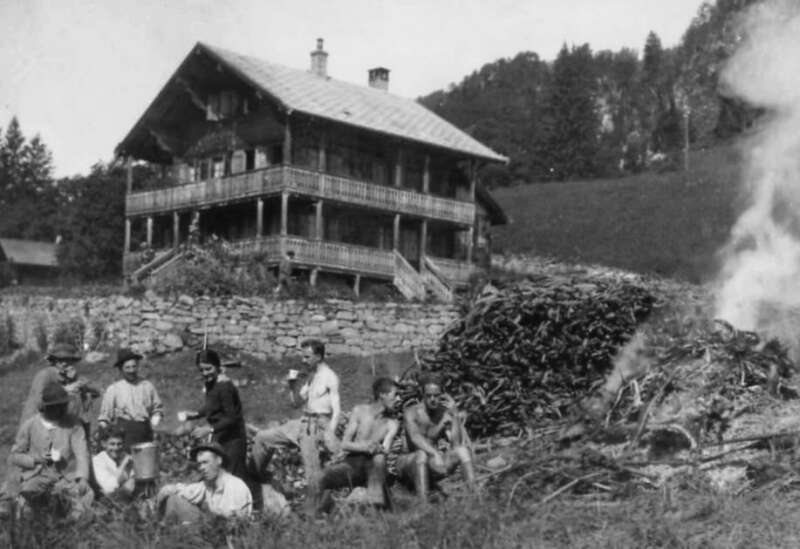
SCI volunteers in 1924 clear debris after an avalanche near Ormont village

Aerial view (1971)

Ormont-Dessus has an area, as of 2009, of 61.65 square kilometers (23.80 sq mi). Of this area, 20.67 km^{2} (7.98 sq mi) or 33.5% is used for agricultural purposes, while 20.26 km^{2} (7.82 sq mi) or 32.9% is forested. Of the rest of the land, 2.21 km^{2} (0.85 sq mi) or 3.6% is settled (buildings or roads), 0.38 km^{2} (0.15 sq mi) or 0.6% is either rivers or lakes and 18.15 km^{2} (7.01 sq mi) or 29.4% is unproductive land.

Of the built up area, housing and buildings made up 1.8% and transportation infrastructure made up 1.5%. Out of the forested land, 27.0% of the total land area is heavily forested and 2.8% is covered with orchards or small clusters of trees. Of the agricultural land, 0.0% is used for growing crops and 6.5% is pastures and 27.0% is used for alpine pastures. All the water in the municipality is flowing water. Of the unproductive areas, 8.1% is unproductive vegetation, 18.6% is too rocky for vegetation and 2.7% of the land is covered by glaciers.

The municipality is located in the Aigle district, in the upper section of the Grande-Eau valley. It consists of the villages of Ormont-Dessus and Vers-l'Eglise as well as scattered individual settlements. Les Diablerets is the highest village.

== Coat of arms ==
The blazon of the municipal coat of arms is Azure, a Coupeaux Vert and a Crescent and Mullet of Five Or.

== Demographics ==
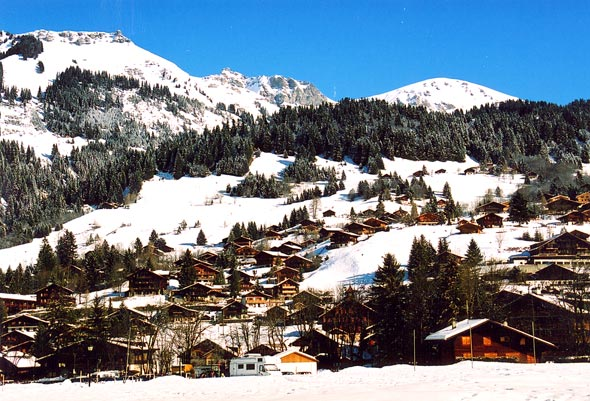
Les Diablerets village

Ormont-Dessus has a population (as of December 2020) of 1,467. As of 2008, 21.0% of the population are resident foreign nationals. Over the last 10 years (1999–2009) the population has changed at a rate of 10.9%. It has changed at a rate of 13.3% due to migration and at a rate of -2.2% due to births and deaths.

Most of the population (as of 2000) speaks French (1,170 or 89.5%), with German being second most common (47 or 3.6%) and Portuguese being third (26 or 2.0%). There are 9 people who speak Italian.

Of the population in the municipality 431 or about 33.0% were born in Ormont-Dessus and lived there in 2000. There were 372 or 28.5% who were born in the same canton, while 184 or 14.1% were born somewhere else in Switzerland, and 284 or 21.7% were born outside of Switzerland.

In 2008 there were 6 live births to Swiss citizens and 1 birth to non-Swiss citizens, and in same time span there were 7 deaths of Swiss citizens. Ignoring immigration and emigration, the population of Swiss citizens decreased by 1 while the foreign population increased by 1. There was 1 Swiss man and 2 Swiss women who immigrated back to Switzerland. At the same time, there were 31 non-Swiss men and 18 non-Swiss women who immigrated from another country to Switzerland. The total Swiss population change in 2008 (from all sources, including moves across municipal borders) was an increase of 2 and the non-Swiss population increased by 27 people. This represents a population growth rate of 2.1%.

The age distribution, as of 2009, in Ormont-Dessus is; 93 children or 6.4% of the population are between 0 and 9 years old and 128 teenagers or 8.8% are between 10 and 19. Of the adult population, 192 people or 13.3% of the population are between 20 and 29 years old. 170 people or 11.7% are between 30 and 39, 191 people or 13.2% are between 40 and 49, and 227 people or 15.7% are between 50 and 59. The senior population distribution is 200 people or 13.8% of the population are between 60 and 69 years old, 154 people or 10.6% are between 70 and 79, there are 75 people or 5.2% who are 80 and 89, and there are 17 people or 1.2% who are 90 and older.

As of 2000, there were 476 people who were single and never married in the municipality. There were 652 married individuals, 101 widows/widowers and 78 divorced individuals.

As of 2000, there were 588 private households in the municipality, and an average of 2.1 persons per household. There were 224 households that consist of only one person and 18 households with five or more people. Out of a total of 621 households that answered this question, 36.1% were households made up of just one person and there were 4 adults who lived with their parents. Of the rest of the households, there are 179 married couples without children, 148 married couples with children. There were 27 single parents with a child or children. There were 6 households that were made up of unrelated people and 33 households that were made up of some sort of institution or another collective housing.

In 2000 there were 601 single family homes (or 58.7% of the total) out of a total of 1,023 inhabited buildings. There were 248 multi-family buildings (24.2%), along with 114 multi-purpose buildings that were mostly used for housing (11.1%) and 60 other use buildings (commercial or industrial) that also had some housing (5.9%). Of the single family homes 205 were built before 1919, while 49 were built between 1990 and 2000. The most multi-family homes (71) were built before 1919 and the next most (54) were built between 1981 and 1990. There were 4 multi-family houses built between 1996 and 2000.

In 2000 there were 1,729 apartments in the municipality. The most common apartment size was 3 rooms of which there were 493. There were 102 single room apartments and 456 apartments with five or more rooms. Of these apartments, a total of 567 apartments (32.8% of the total) were permanently occupied, while 1,061 apartments (61.4%) were seasonally occupied and 101 apartments (5.8%) were empty. As of 2009, the construction rate of new housing units was 42.1 new units per 1000 residents. The vacancy rate for the municipality, in 2010, was 2.04%.

The historical population is given in the following chart:

== Heritage sites of national significance ==
The Swiss Reformed Church of Saint-Théodule and the village sawmill (French: Scierie) are listed as Swiss heritage site of national significance. The villages of Vers-l’Église and La Ville are part of the Inventory of Swiss Heritage Sites.

== Politics ==
In the 2007 federal election the most popular party was the FDP which received 34.38% of the vote. The next three most popular parties were the SVP (27.47%), the SP (12.65%) and the LPS Party (7.81%). In the federal election, a total of 404 votes were cast, and the voter turnout was 42.2%.

== Economy ==
As of 2010, Ormont-Dessus had an unemployment rate of 2.4%. As of 2008, there were 46 people employed in the primary economic sector and about 25 businesses involved in this sector. 116 people were employed in the secondary sector and there were 20 businesses in this sector. 449 people were employed in the tertiary sector, with 81 businesses in this sector. There were 639 residents of the municipality who were employed in some capacity, of which females made up 42.1% of the workforce.

In 2008 the total number of full-time equivalent jobs was 530. The number of jobs in the primary sector was 33, of which 30 were in agriculture and 3 were in forestry or lumber production. The number of jobs in the secondary sector was 111 of which 20 or (18.0%) were in manufacturing and 92 (82.9%) were in construction. The number of jobs in the tertiary sector was 386. In the tertiary sector; 58 or 15.0% were in wholesale or retail sales or the repair of motor vehicles, 31 or 8.0% were in the movement and storage of goods, 173 or 44.8% were in a hotel or restaurant, 2 or 0.5% were in the information industry, 10 or 2.6% were the insurance or financial industry, 7 or 1.8% were technical professionals or scientists, 8 or 2.1% were in education and 38 or 9.8% were in health care.

In 2000, there were 112 workers who commuted into the municipality and 174 workers who commuted away. The municipality is a net exporter of workers, with about 1.6 workers leaving the municipality for every one entering. Of the working population, 7.4% used public transportation to get to work, and 52.4% used a private car.

== Religion ==
From the 2000 census, 299 or 22.9% were Roman Catholic, while 768 or 58.8% belonged to the Swiss Reformed Church. Of the rest of the population, there were 37 members of an Orthodox church (or about 2.83% of the population), and there were 11 individuals (or about 0.84% of the population) who belonged to another Christian church. There were 13 (or about 0.99% of the population) who were Islamic. There was 1 person who was Buddhist and 5 individuals who belonged to another church. 124 (or about 9.49% of the population) belonged to no church, are agnostic or atheist, and 49 individuals (or about 3.75% of the population) did not answer the question.

== Education ==
In Ormont-Dessus about 464 or (35.5%) of the population have completed non-mandatory upper secondary education, and 147 or (11.2%) have completed additional higher education (either university or a Fachhochschule). Of the 147 who completed tertiary schooling, 45.6% were Swiss men, 33.3% were Swiss women, 9.5% were non-Swiss men and 11.6% were non-Swiss women.

In the 2009/2010 school year there were a total of 113 students in the Ormont-Dessus school district. In the Vaud cantonal school system, two years of non-obligatory pre-school are provided by the political districts. During the school year, the political district provided pre-school care for a total of 205 children of which 96 children (46.8%) received subsidized pre-school care. The canton's primary school program requires students to attend for four years. There were 62 students in the municipal primary school program. The obligatory lower secondary school program lasts for six years and there were 50 students in those schools. There were also 1 students who were home schooled or attended another non-traditional school.

As of 2000, there were 132 students from Ormont-Dessus who attended schools outside the municipality.
