= Oldenhorn =

Mountain in Switzerland

- French: L'Oldenhorn or Becca d'Audon
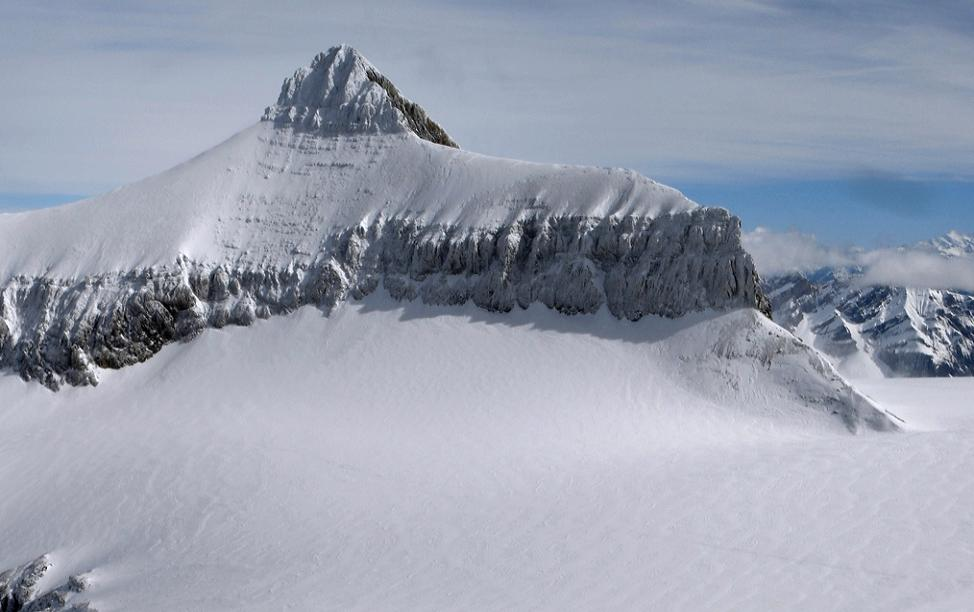

Highest point
- Elevation: 3,123 m (10,246 ft)
- Prominence: 307 m (1,007 ft)
- Parent peak: Sommet des Diablerets
- Listing: Alpine mountains above 3000 m
- Coordinates: 46°19′45.3″N 7°13′17.9″E

Naming
- Native name: Oldehore (Swiss Standard German); Becca d'Audon (French)

Geography
- Location within Switzerland
- Country: Switzerland
- Cantons: Nidwalden and Obwalden
- Parent range: Bernese Alps
- Topo map: Swiss Federal Office of Topography swisstopo

Climbing
- Easiest route: Cable car from Col du Pillon

The Oldenhorn (Swiss German: Oldehore; French: L'Oldenhorn or Becca d'Audon) is a mountain in the western Bernese Alps in Switzerland. The summit is the tripoint between the cantons of Vaud, Bern and Valais.

The Oldenhorn is the second highest peak of the massif of the Diablerets and canton of Vaud. It overlooks the Tsanfleuron Glacier on the south and the Col du Pillon on the north.

The summit can be easily reached by the east ridge in less than three hours. The nearby Scex Rouge (2,950 m) is connected from the Col du Pillon by a cable car. The Tsanfleuron Glacier must be crossed.
