= Col du Pillon =

Mountain pass in Bernese Alps, Switzerland

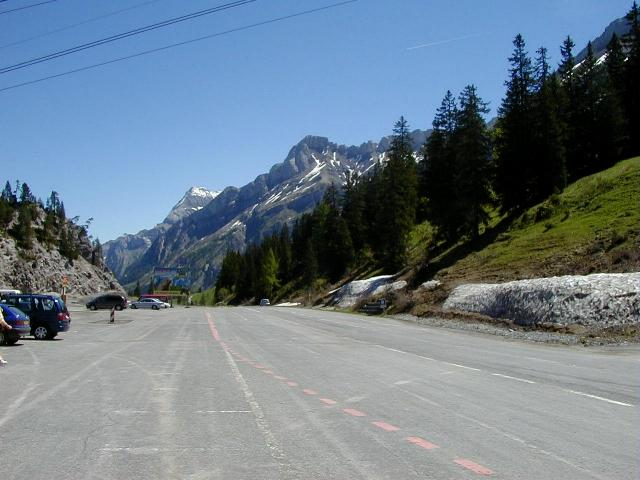
- Col du Pillon

- Location within Switzerland
- Elevation: 1,546 metres (5,072 ft)
- Traversed by: Road

Third Approach
- Location: Vaud, Switzerland
- Range: Alps
- Coordinates: 46°21′25″N 07°12′56″E

Col du Pillon (el. 1546 m) is a mountain pass in the western Swiss Alps, linking Aigle, Le Sépey and Les Diablerets in the canton of Vaud with Gstaad in the canton of Berne. The pass itself is located within the canton of Vaud, approximately one kilometre from the border with Berne. Col du Pillon is overlooked by the Diablerets and at the pass is located the lower station of the Scex Rouge cable car.

== See also ==
- List of highest paved roads in Europe
- List of mountain passes
- List of the highest Swiss passes
