= List of mountains of Vaud =

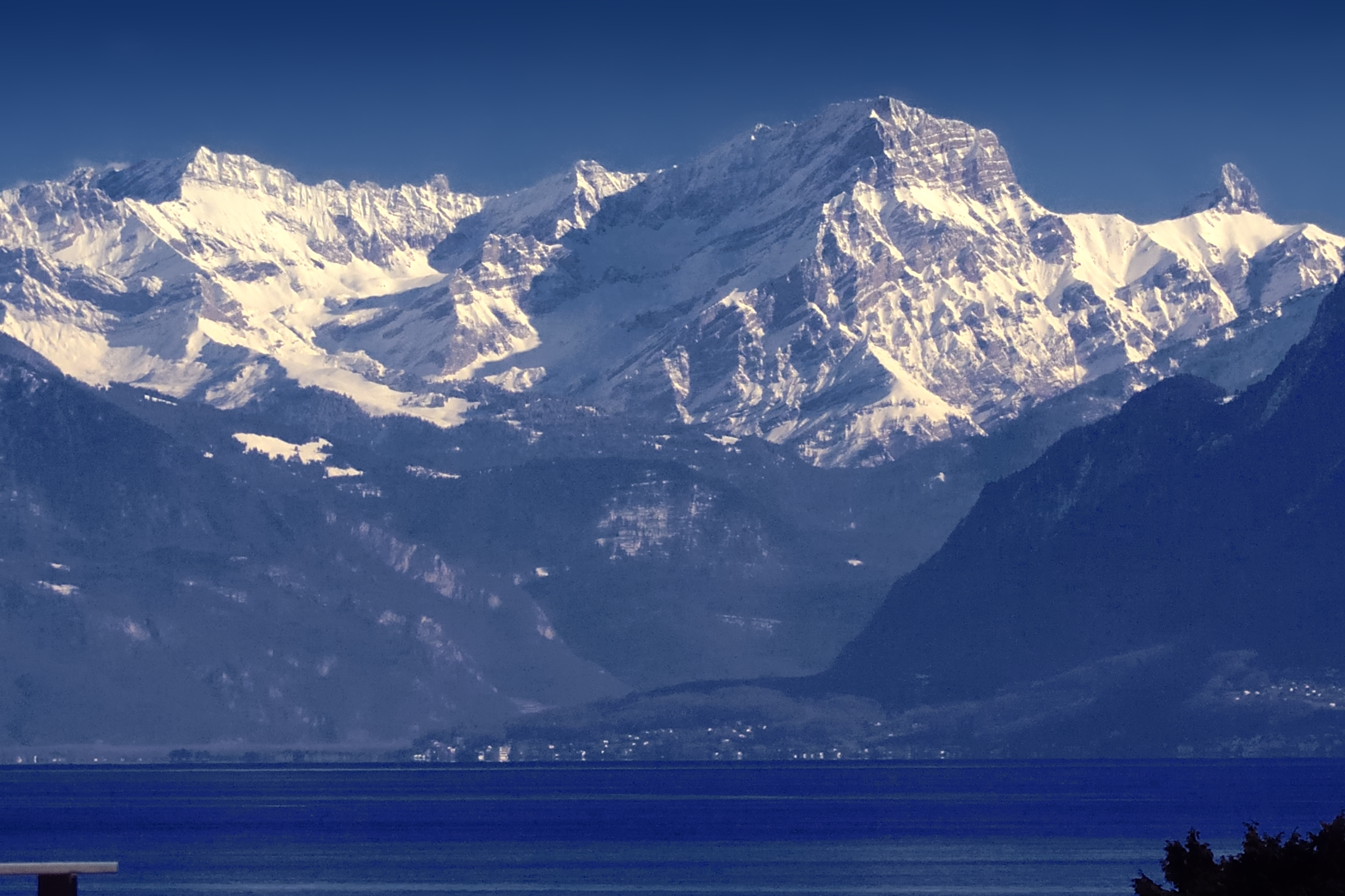
All the highest mountains of the canton, such as the Grand Muveran (pictured), overlook Lake Geneva from the south.

This is a list of mountains of the Swiss canton of Vaud. Vaud is partly mountainous and is one of the nine cantons having summits above 3,000 metres. It is also one of the two cantons (with Bern) extending over both the high Alps and the Jura. Topographically, the three most important summits of the canton are those of the Diablerets (most elevated), the Vanil Noir (most prominent) and Mont Tendre (most isolated).

The first table lists the highest summits of the canton. It includes all summits above 2,800 metres with a topographic prominence of at least 30 metres (98 ft). The seconde table only includes significant summits with a topographic prominence of at least 150 metres (492 ft), but has no height cut-off. There are over 40 such summits in Vaud and they are mostly found in its westernmost and easternmost districts. All mountain heights and prominences on the list are from the largest-scale maps available.

== Highest summits ==
Mountain	Height (m)	Drop (m)	Coordinates	Range	District(s)	First ascent
Diablerets, Southwest-Top	3210	968	46°18′14″N 07°11′20″E	Alps	Aigle	1850
Oldenhorn	3123	307	46°19′45″N 07°13′18″E	Alps	Aigle	
Grand Muveran	3051	1013	46°14′14″N 07°07′34″E	Alps	Aigle	
Tête Ronde	3037	108	46°18′13″N 07°10′40″E	Alps	Aigle	
Scex Rouge	2971	131	46°19′38″N 07°12′09″E	Alps	Aigle	
Dent de Morcles	2969	466	46°11′57″N 07°04′32″E	Alps	Aigle	1787
Petite Dent de Morcles	2929	59	46°12′04″N 07°04′16″E	Alps	Aigle	
Dent Favre	2917	316	46°12′37″N 07°06′14″E	Alps	Aigle	
Tête à Pierre Grept	2904	165	46°15′10″N 07°09′19″E	Alps	Aigle	
Tête Noire	2872	72	46°12′06″N 07°05′18″E	Alps	Aigle	
Tête aux Veillons	2846	46	46°14′28″N 07°08′41″E	Alps	Aigle	
Petit Muveran	2810	265	46°13′25″N 07°07′21″E	Alps	Aigle	

== Main list ==
Mountain	Height (m)	Drop (m)	Coordinates	Range	District(s)	First ascent
Diablerets, Southwest-Top	3210	968	46°18′14″N 07°11′20″E	Alps	Aigle	1850
Oldenhorn	3123	307	46°19′45″N 07°13′18″E	Alps	Aigle	
Grand Muveran	3051	1013	46°14′14″N 07°07′34″E	Alps	Aigle	
Dent de Morcles	2969	466	46°11′57″N 07°04′32″E	Alps	Aigle	1787
Dent Favre	2917	316	46°12′37″N 07°06′14″E	Alps	Aigle	
Tête à Pierre Grept	2904	165	46°15′10″N 07°09′19″E	Alps	Aigle	
Petit Muveran	2810	265	46°13′25″N 07°07′21″E	Alps	Aigle	
Le Tarent	2548	1002	46°22′56″N 07°08′51″E	Alps	Aigle/Riviera-Pays-d'Enhaut	
Gummfluh	2458	574	46°26′26″N 07°11′42″E	Alps	Riviera-Pays-d'Enhaut	
L'Argentine (Haute Pointe)	2422	393	46°16′24″N 07°07′51″E	Alps	Aigle	
Vanil Noir	2389	1110	46°31′43″N 07°08′54″E	Alps	Riviera-Pays-d'Enhaut	
Cape au Moine	2352	199	46°22′50″N 07°10′16″E	Alps	Aigle/Riviera-Pays-d'Enhaut	
Wittenberghorn	2350	465	46°32′56″N 07°01′02″E	Alps	Riviera-Pays-d'Enhaut	
Tour d'Aï	2331	886	46°22′20″N 07°00′02″E	Alps	Aigle	
Tour de Mayen	2326	186	46°22′28″N 07°00′30″E	Alps	Aigle	
Pointe des Savolaires	2294	183	46°14′07″N 07°05′10″E	Alps	Aigle	
Le Rubli	2285	251	46°27′47″N 07°12′39″E	Alps	Riviera-Pays-d'Enhaut	
Dent de Savigny	2252	848	46°32′59″N 07°13′36″E	Alps	Riviera-Pays-d'Enhaut	
Dent de Ruth	2236	186	46°33′14″N 07°14′13″E	Alps	Riviera-Pays-d'Enhaut	
Gros Van	2189	528	46°23′47″N 07°04′09″E	Alps	Aigle	
Tête à Josué	2133	255	46°24′17″N 07°10′09″E	Alps	Riviera-Pays-d'Enhaut	
Le Chamossaire	2112	377	46°19′36″N 07°03′41″E	Alps	Aigle	
Rocher du Midi	2097	240	46°26′37″N 07°09′11″E	Alps	Riviera-Pays-d'Enhaut	
Dent de Combette	2082	242	46°31′39″N 07°12′14″E	Alps	Riviera-Pays-d'Enhaut	
Rochers de Naye	2042	590	46°25′55″N 06°58′34″E	Alps	Aigle/Riviera-Pays-d'Enhaut	
Chaux Ronde	2028	223	46°19′23″N 07°05′33″E	Alps	Aigle	
Pointe d'Aveneyre	2026	405	46°25′02″N 07°00′17″E	Alps	Aigle	
Dent de Corjon	1967	579	46°27′00″N 07°02′09″E	Alps	Riviera-Pays-d'Enhaut	
Cape au Moine	1941	150	46°28′13″N 06°58′44″E	Alps	Riviera-Pays-d'Enhaut	
Malatraix	1931	131	46°23′51″N 06°58′30″E	Alps	Aigle	
Planachaux	1925	287	46°26′39″N 07°03′17″E	Alps	Riviera-Pays-d'Enhaut	
Corne des Brenlaires	1879	204	46°24′46″N 07°08′16″E	Alps	Riviera-Pays-d'Enhaut	
Les Rodomonts	1878	218	46°30′26″N 07°13′35″E	Alps	Riviera-Pays-d'Enhaut	
Le Molard	1752	176	46°29′03″N 06°57′36″E	Alps	Riviera-Pays-d'Enhaut	
Monts Chevreuils	1749	259	46°26′04″N 07°05′03″E	Alps	Riviera-Pays-d'Enhaut	
Mont Tendre	1679	451	46°35′41″N 06°18′36″E	Jura Mountains	Morges	
La Laitemaire	1678	283	46°29′26″N 07°09′46″E	Alps	Riviera-Pays-d'Enhaut	
La Dôle	1677	355	46°25′30″N 06°05′58″E	Jura Mountains	Nyon	
Chasseron	1607	590	46°51′06″N 06°32′19″E	Jura Mountains	Jura-Nord vaudois	
Le Suchet	1588	435	46°46′21″N 06°27′58″E	Jura Mountains	Jura-Nord vaudois	
Le Noirmont	1567	237	46°29′03″N 06°06′57″E	Jura Mountains	Nyon	
Aiguilles de Baulmes	1559	280	46°47′28″N 06°28′20″E	Jura Mountains	Jura-Nord vaudois	
Dent de Vaulion	1483	339	46°41′05″N 06°21′00″E	Jura Mountains	Jura-Nord vaudois	
Mont Risoux	1419	169	46°39′39″N 06°14′32″E	Jura Mountains	Jura-Nord vaudois	
Les Pléiades	1397	242	46°29′23″N 06°54′47″E	Alps	Riviera-Pays-d'Enhaut	
Mont Pèlerin	1080	327	46°29′49″N 06°49′09″E	Alps	Riviera-Pays-d'Enhaut	
Montagne du Château	929	249	46°34′51″N 06°42′47″E	Jorat	Lausanne/Lavaux-Oron	
Mont de Gourze	924	204	46°30′40″N 06°44′26″E	Swiss Plateau	Lavaux-Oron	

== See also ==
- List of mountains of Switzerland
- Swiss Alps
