= Grand Chavalard =

Mountain in Switzerland

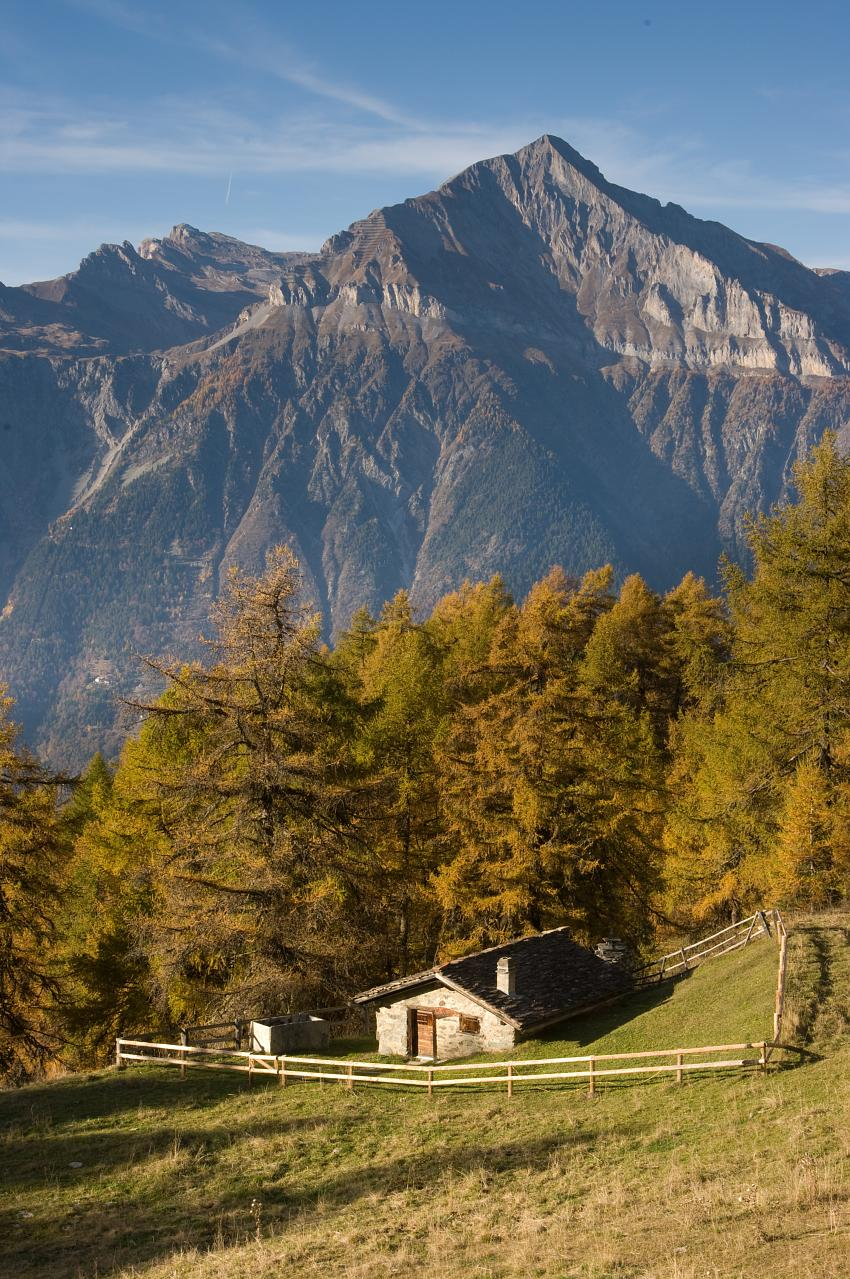

Highest point
- Elevation: 2,901 m (9,518 ft)
- Prominence: 447 m (1,467 ft)
- Parent peak: Grand Muveran
- Coordinates: 46°10′44″N 7°06′47.6″E

Geography
- Location within Switzerland
- Location: Valais, Switzerland
- Parent range: Bernese Alps

The Grand Chavalard is a mountain in the western part of the Bernese Alps in Valais, overlooking the Rhone at Fully near Martigny. The mountain is located close to the Dent de Morcles on the north-west.
