= Salentse =

Salenste
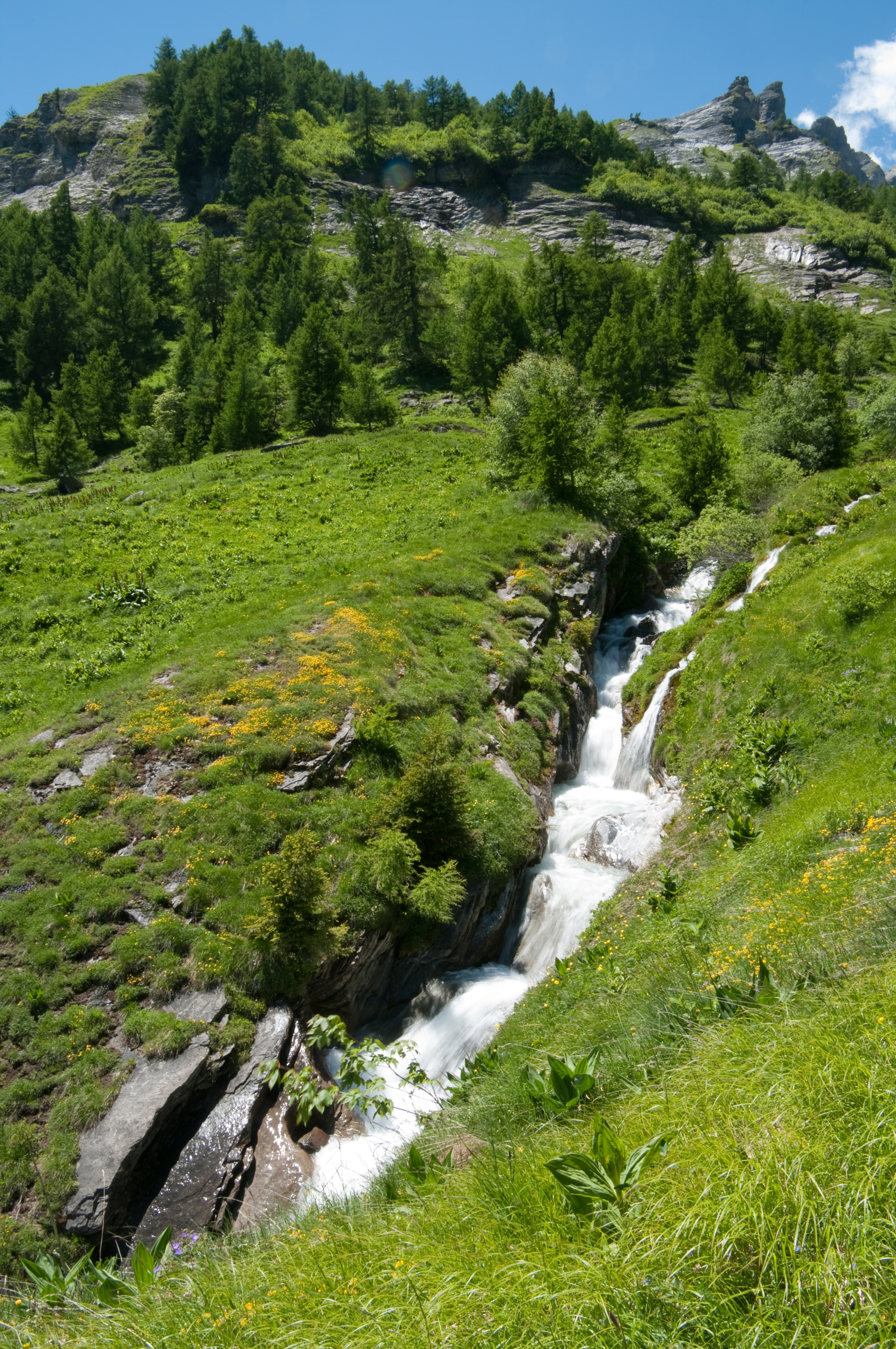

Location
- Country: Switzerland

Physical characteristics
- Source
  - location: Plan Salentze
  - coordinates: 46°13′46″N 7°07′45″E
  - elevation: 2,350 m (7,710 ft)
- Mouth
  - location: Rhône
  - coordinates: 46°10′30″N 7°12′06″E
  - elevation: 468 m (1,535 ft)
- Length: 9 km (5.6 mi)

The Salentse is a river in Valais, Switzerland, and a right tributary of the Rhône. Its source is north of the municipality of Leytron, near the Grand Muveran. It flows south to join the Rhône, in the city of Saillon. During the 1840s, an irrigation canal was dug to irrigate and bring water to Saillon.
