= Le Soliat =

Mountain in Switzerland

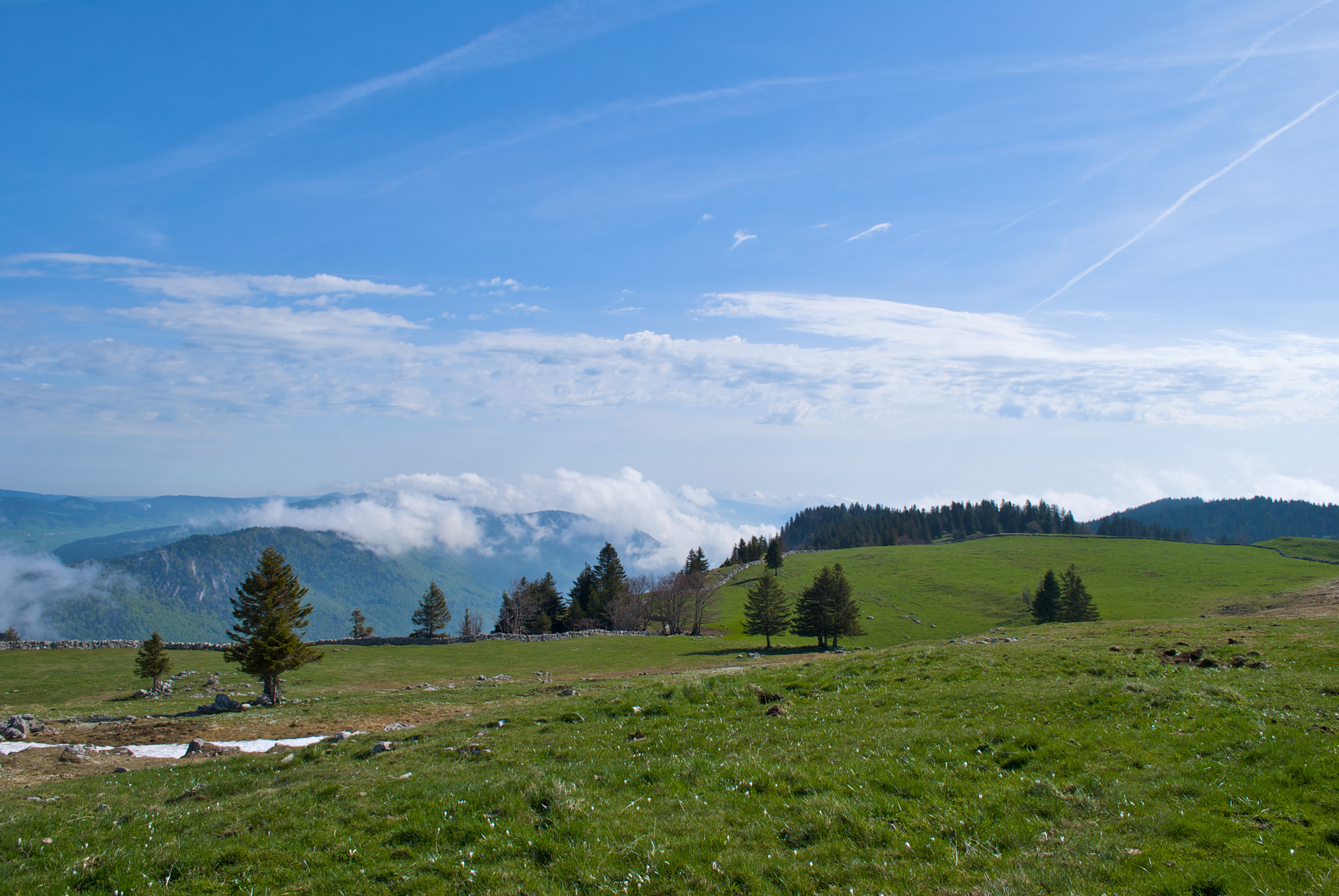
- View from the summit area

Highest point
- Elevation: 1,464 m (4,803 ft)
- Prominence: 204 m (669 ft)
- Parent peak: Le Chasseron
- Isolation: 14.9 km (9.3 mi)
- Coordinates: 46°55′43″N 6°43′29″E

Geography
- Location within Switzerland
- Location: Neuchâtel, Switzerland (mountain partially in Vaud)
- Parent range: Jura Mountains

Le Soliat is a mountain of the Jura, overlooking Lake Neuchâtel in western Switzerland. The main summit (1,465 m) is located within the canton of Neuchâtel. A secondary summit (1,463 m) is located within the canton of Vaud.

The north side of the mountain forms a rocky cirque named Creux du Van.

== See also ==
- List of most isolated mountains of Switzerland
