= Ovronnaz =

Village in the canton of Valais, Switzerland

Coordinates: 46°12′07″N 7°10′08″E

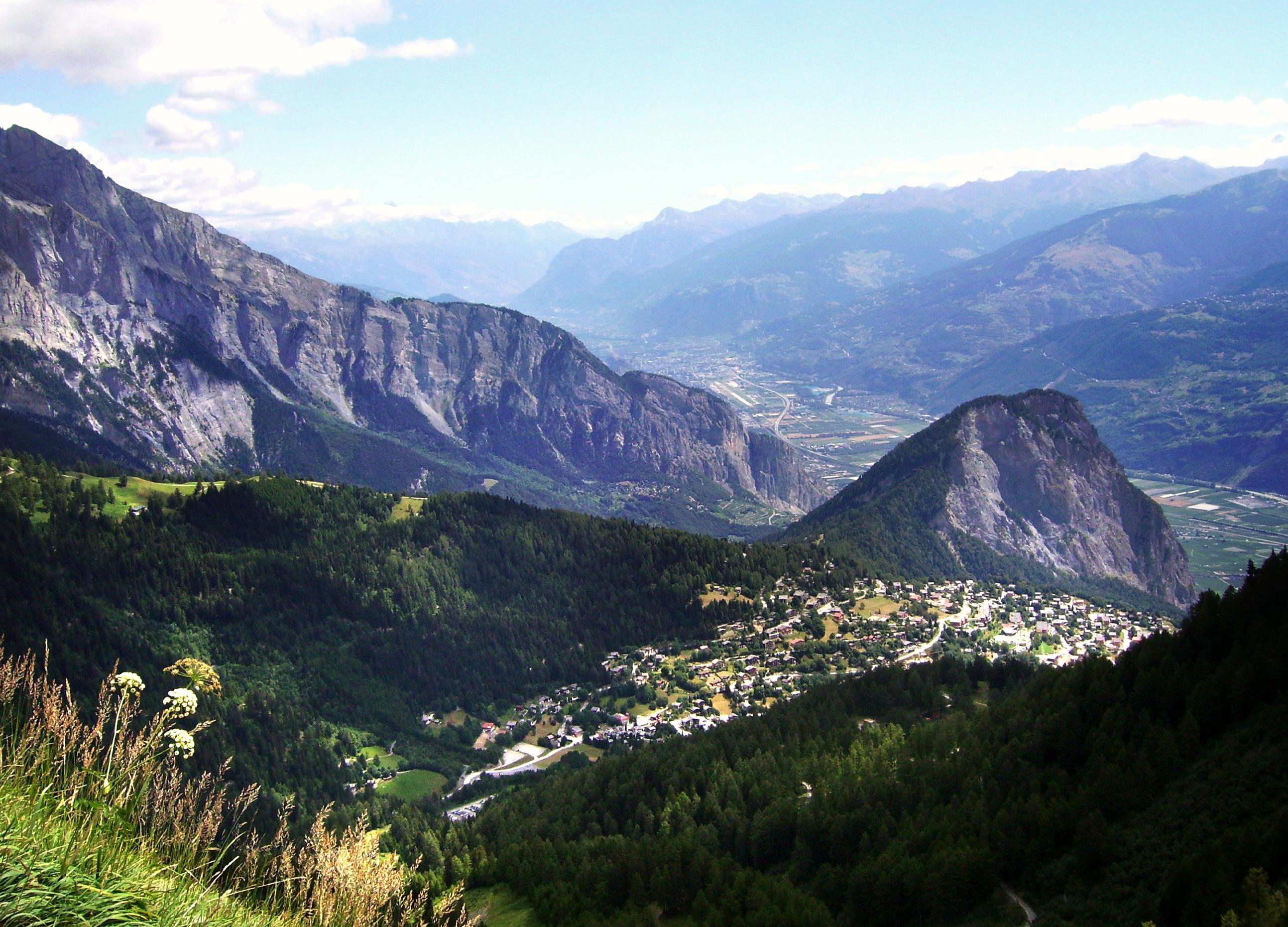
View of Ovronnaz and the Rhone valley

Ovronnaz is a French speaking village located in the canton of Valais, Switzerland. It lies in the municipality of Leytron, close to Martigny.

The village is located on the south side of the Bernese Alps, on a terrace above the Rhone river, at an altitude of 1,330 metres. The region is surrounded by the summits of Grand Chavalard, Petit and Grand Muveran and Haut de Cry.

It is known for its three thermal pools, two of which are open air, as well as its ski resort and a spa resort.
