= Pointe des Savolaires =

Mountain in Switzerland

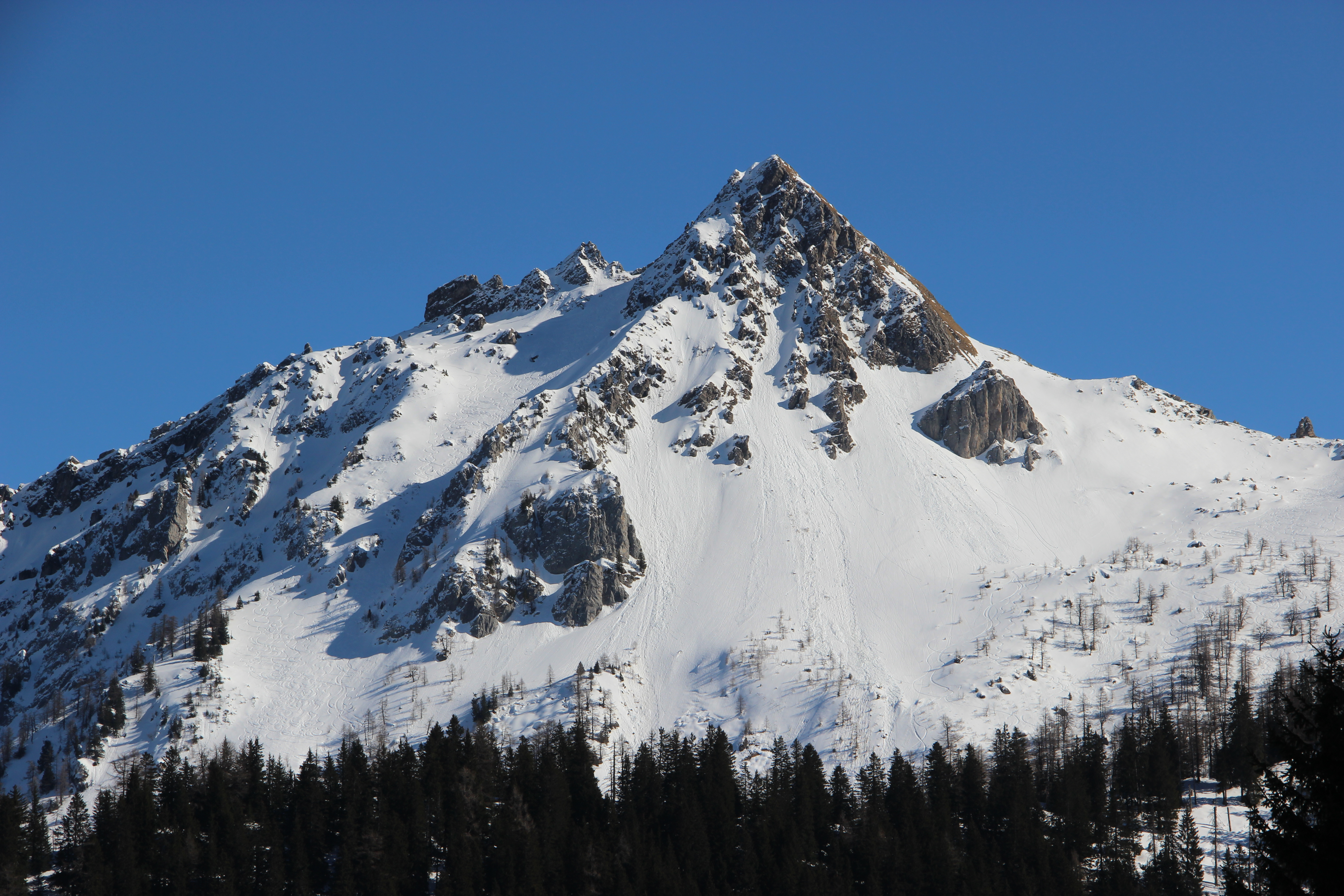

Highest point
- Elevation: 2,294 m (7,526 ft)
- Prominence: 183 m (600 ft)
- Parent peak: Grand Muveran
- Coordinates: 46°14′7.3″N 7°5′9.7″E

Geography
- Location within Switzerland
- Location: Vaud, Switzerland
- Parent range: Bernese Alps

The Pointe des Savolaires is a mountain of the western Bernese Alps, located east of Bex in the canton of Vaud. It lies on the chain north of the Dent de Morcles.
