= La Dôle =

Mountain in Switzerland

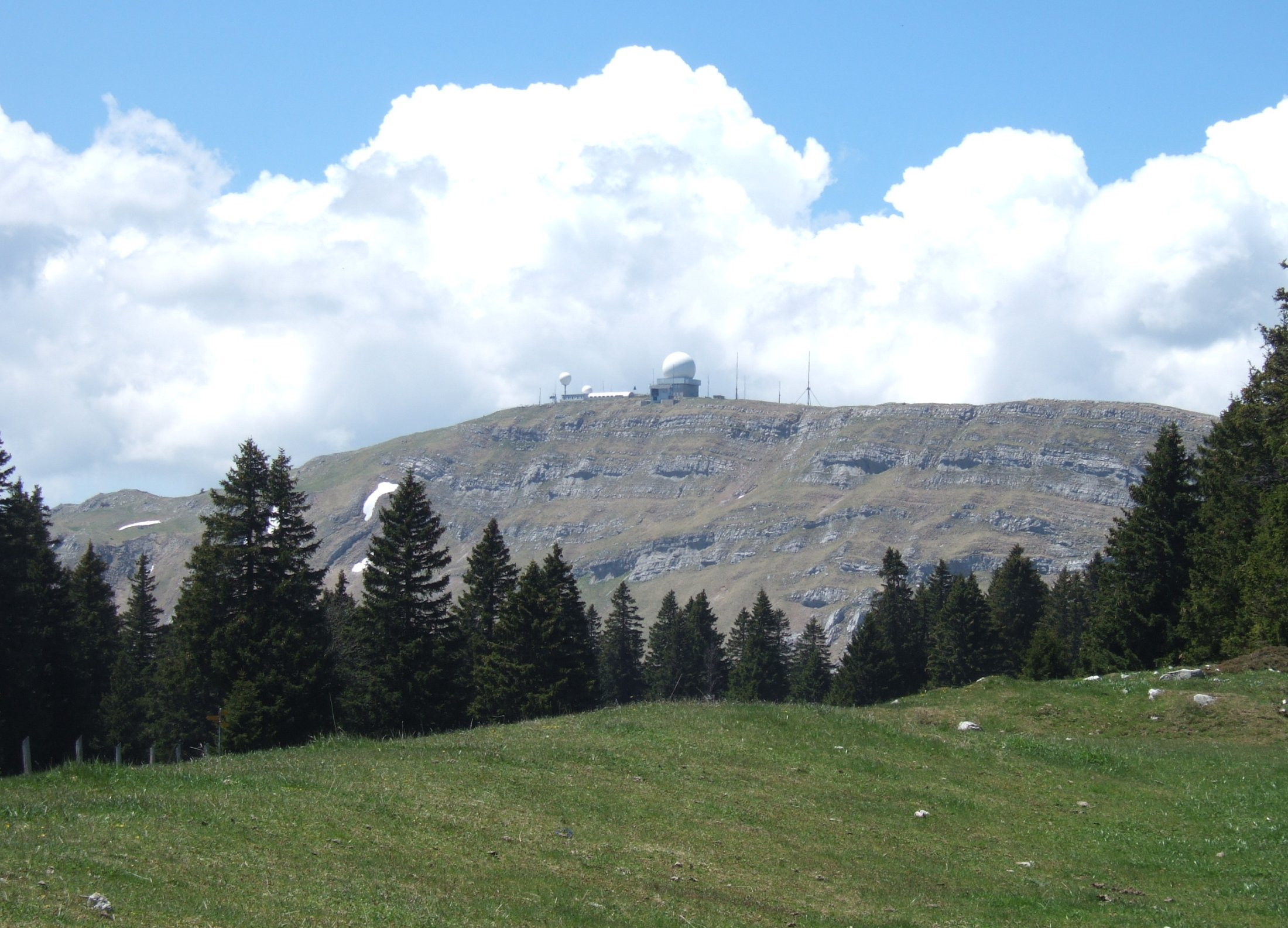

Highest point
- Elevation: 1,677 m (5,502 ft)
- Prominence: 357 m (1,171 ft)
- Parent peak: Crêt de la Neige
- Isolation: 13.9 km (8.6 mi)
- Coordinates: 46°25′30″N 6°05′58″E

Geography
- Location within Switzerland
- Location: Vaud, Switzerland
- Parent range: Jura Mountains

Geology
- Rock age: Jurassic

La Dôle (French pronunciation: [la dol]) is one of the Jura Mountains, and overlooks Lake Geneva in the westernmost part of the canton of Vaud. Rising to an altitude of 1677 meters, it is the second highest peak in the Swiss portion of the Jura, after Mont Tendre. Administratively, the summit is split between the municipalities of Gingins, Chéserex and La Rippe. The mountain is also close to and easily accessible from Saint-Cergue and the Col de la Givrine to the north, both above 1000 meters and connected to Nyon on Lake Geneva by road and by the Nyon–St-Cergue–Morez Railway. A paved road also climbs to the Chalet de la Dôle below the summit (1439 m) from Gingins.

La Dôle overlooks to south-east the summit of La Barillette, the town of Nyon, Lake Geneva and across the lake the Alps, including the Bernese Alps the Chablais Alps and the Mont Blanc massif. To the south are views of the City of Geneva and the Canton of Geneva; to the north the village of Les Rousses. The Dôle massif has a second peak to the northeast, the Pointe de Poêle Chaud, accessible via the col between them which drops to 1557 m.

La Dôle massif is the northwesternmost part of the Swiss Plateau. To the southwest it ends at the Col de la Faucille, and to the northwest at the Valserine valley, a Rhône tributary. To the north it ends at the Col de la Givrine, and towards the southeast merges into the Swiss Plateau.

The northwestern side of La Dôle is equipped with ski-lifts and is traversed by alpine ski paths. There is a restricted-access cable car which provides service to the various electronic facilities on the top, including a ball containing aviation radar, a Swiss weather station, television, radio and EBU telecommunications.

== Climate ==
Due to its altitude and exposed location La Dôle features a subarctic climate (Dfc) according to the Köppen climate classification, with cool summers and relatively long and snowy winters. Precipitation is spread out evenly throughout the year and with 1,845 mm it is quite high. Winter storms are common and its exposed location contribute to a high annual average wind speed of 8.0 m/s.

Climate data for La Dôle, elevation 1,670 m (5,480 ft), (1991–2020)
| Month | Jan | Feb | Mar | Apr | May | Jun | Jul | Aug | Sep | Oct | Nov | Dec | Year |
|---|---|---|---|---|---|---|---|---|---|---|---|---|---|
| Mean daily maximum °C (°F) | 0.2 (32.4) | −0.1 (31.8) | 2.4 (36.3) | 5.9 (42.6) | 10.2 (50.4) | 14.0 (57.2) | 16.2 (61.2) | 16.2 (61.2) | 12.2 (54.0) | 8.7 (47.7) | 3.7 (38.7) | 1.1 (34.0) | 7.6 (45.7) |
| Daily mean °C (°F) | −2.4 (27.7) | −2.8 (27.0) | −0.5 (31.1) | 2.4 (36.3) | 6.4 (43.5) | 10.1 (50.2) | 12.1 (53.8) | 12.3 (54.1) | 8.6 (47.5) | 5.5 (41.9) | 0.9 (33.6) | −1.5 (29.3) | 4.3 (39.7) |
| Mean daily minimum °C (°F) | −4.8 (23.4) | −5.4 (22.3) | −3.1 (26.4) | −0.6 (30.9) | 3.2 (37.8) | 6.7 (44.1) | 8.7 (47.7) | 9.1 (48.4) | 5.8 (42.4) | 2.9 (37.2) | −1.5 (29.3) | −4.0 (24.8) | 1.4 (34.5) |
| Average precipitation mm (inches) | 167.9 (6.61) | 137.1 (5.40) | 144.5 (5.69) | 121.6 (4.79) | 148.9 (5.86) | 144.2 (5.68) | 148.1 (5.83) | 136.6 (5.38) | 145.9 (5.74) | 171.4 (6.75) | 171.0 (6.73) | 207.7 (8.18) | 1,844.9 (72.63) |
| Average snowfall cm (inches) | 107.3 (42.2) | 81.8 (32.2) | 103.3 (40.7) | 60.8 (23.9) | 21.0 (8.3) | 0.8 (0.3) | 0.0 (0.0) | 0.0 (0.0) | 0.8 (0.3) | 13.0 (5.1) | 49.8 (19.6) | 91.7 (36.1) | 530.3 (208.8) |
| Average precipitation days (≥ 1.0 mm) | 12.4 | 11.5 | 12.0 | 11.9 | 14.2 | 12.4 | 12.0 | 11.1 | 10.8 | 12.4 | 12.8 | 13.8 | 147.3 |
| Average snowy days (≥ 1.0 cm) | 10.4 | 9.2 | 11.1 | 8.0 | 3.2 | 0.3 | 0.0 | 0.0 | 0.3 | 3.1 | 6.8 | 9.4 | 61.8 |
| Average relative humidity (%) | 76 | 76 | 78 | 79 | 82 | 82 | 80 | 80 | 83 | 80 | 79 | 76 | 79 |
| Mean monthly sunshine hours | 110.8 | 118.0 | 153.9 | 157.1 | 166.0 | 189.3 | 210.6 | 201.0 | 162.1 | 140.6 | 103.3 | 94.6 | 1,807.3 |
| Percentage possible sunshine | 40 | 40 | 42 | 40 | 38 | 43 | 47 | 48 | 45 | 42 | 37 | 36 | 42 |
Source 1: NOAA
Source 2: MeteoSwiss (snow 1981–2010)

== Media ==
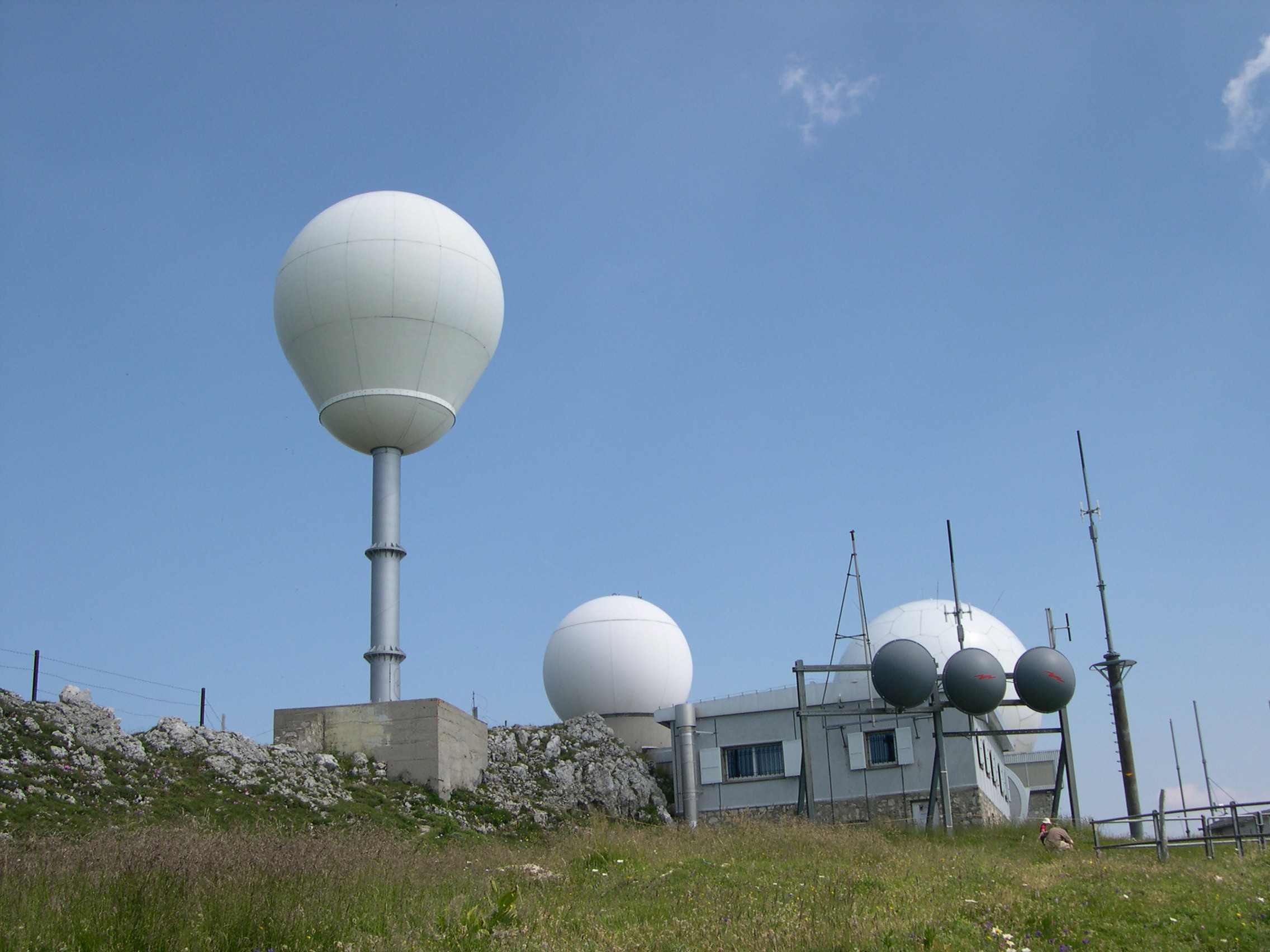
Radar on the summit

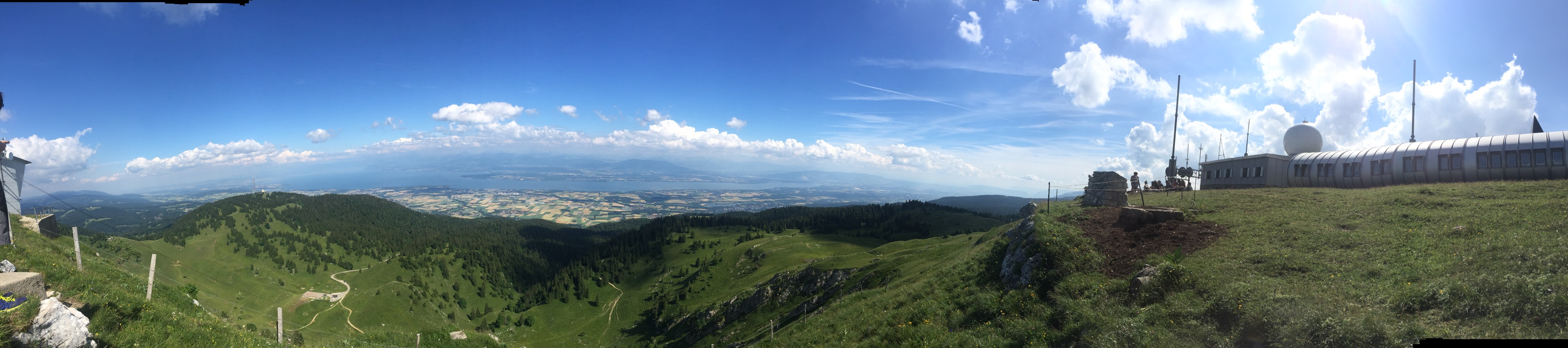
Panorama from the summit's perspective overlooking Geneva.

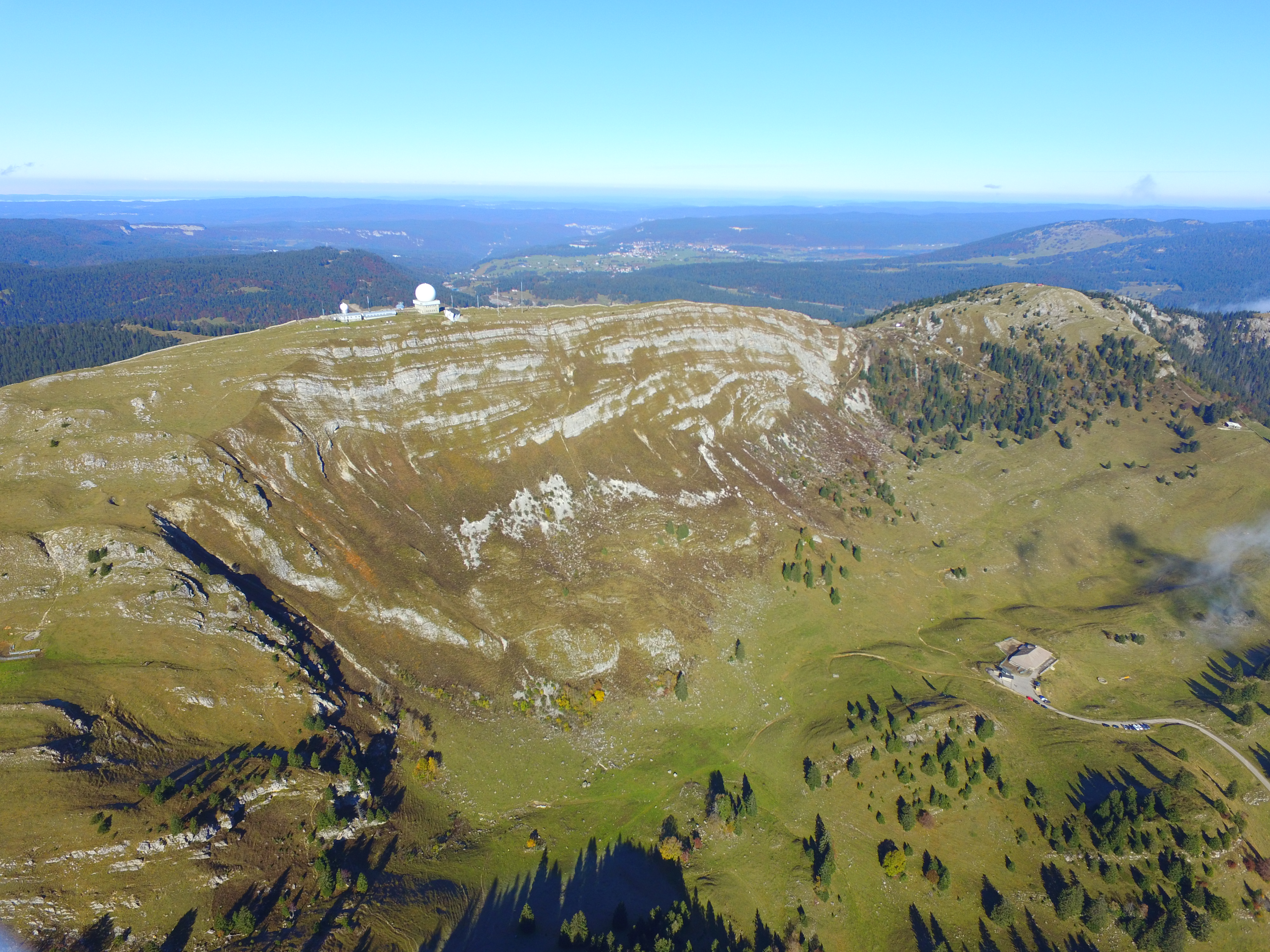
Aerial view

== See also ==
- List of mountains of Vaud
- List of mountains of Switzerland
- List of most isolated mountains of Switzerland
- List of mountains of Switzerland accessible by public transport
