= Montagne du Château =

Mountain in Switzerland

- Location within Switzerland

Highest point
- Elevation: 929 m (3,048 ft)
- Prominence: 249 m (817 ft)
- Isolation: 10.3 km (6.4 mi)
- Coordinates: 46°34′51″N 06°42′57″E

Geography
- Location: Vaud, Switzerland
- Parent range: Jorat

Montagne du Château (929 metres (3,048 ft)) is the highest hill of the Jorat. It lies west of Montpreveyres in the canton of Vaud, above the city of Lausanne. The hill is entirely wooded, except for its summit, where there is a clearing.

== See also ==
- List of mountains of Vaud
- List of most isolated mountains of Switzerland
