= Malatraix =

Mountain in Switzerland

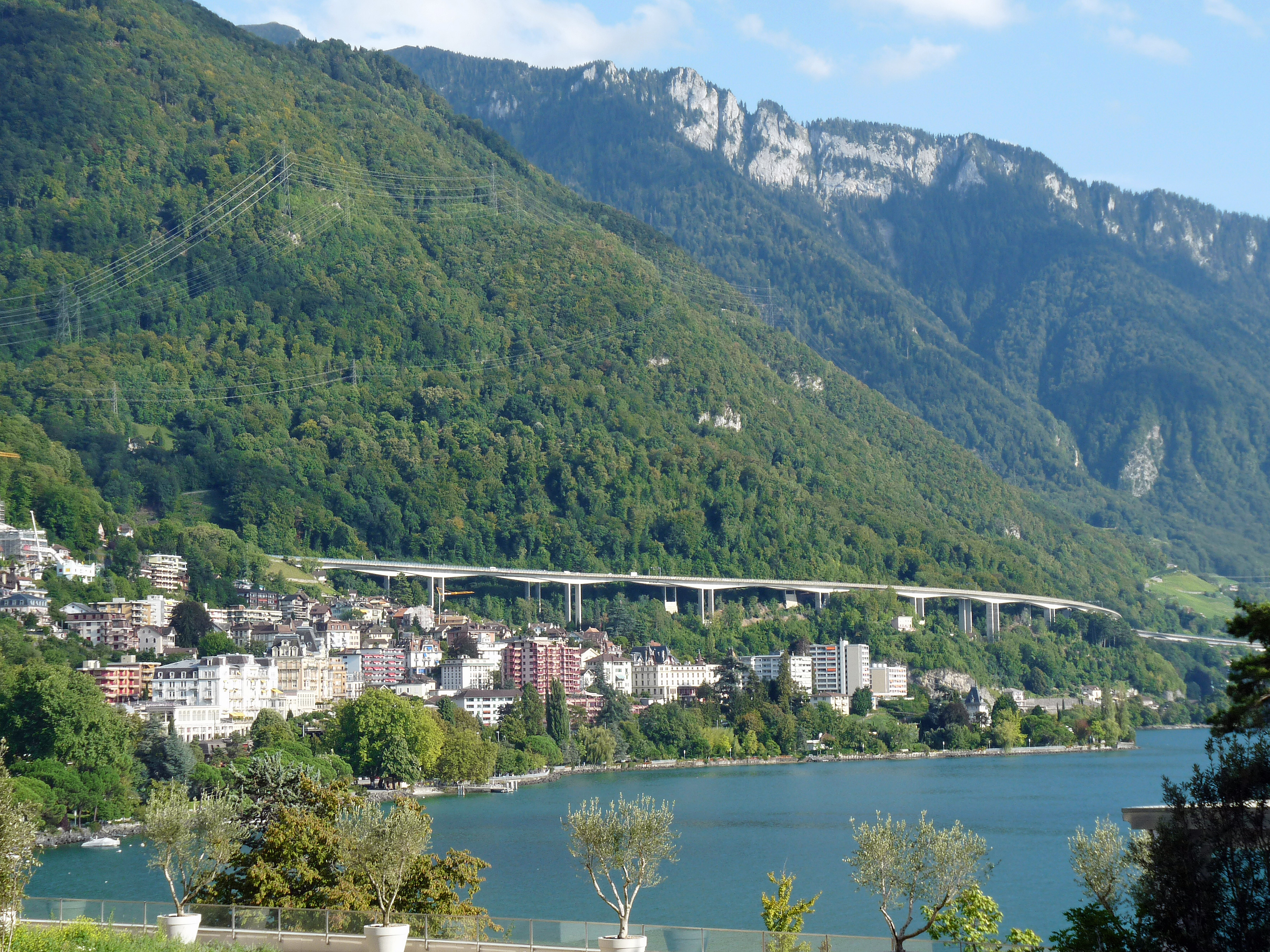
- The Malatraix ridge (background) from Montreux

Highest point
- Elevation: 1,931 m (6,335 ft)
- Prominence: 131 m (430 ft)
- Parent peak: Pointe d'Aveneyre
- Coordinates: 46°23′51″N 06°58′30″E

Geography
- Location within Switzerland
- Location: Vaud, Switzerland
- Parent range: Swiss Prealps

The Malatraix is a mountain and ridge of the Swiss Prealps, overlooking Lake Geneva in the canton of Vaud. The summit is 1,931 metres (6,335 ft) high, while the rocky part of the southwestern ridge culminates at 1,768 metres (5,801 ft). The Malatraix is part of the range between the Rochers de Naye and the Tour d'Aï, which culminates at the Pointe d'Aveneyre (2,026 metres; 6,647 ft). It belongs to the municipality of Villeneuve.
