= List of most-isolated mountains of Switzerland =

This is a list of the most topographically isolated mountains of Switzerland. This list only includes summits with an isolation of at least 10.0 kilometres (6.2 mi), regardless of their elevation or topographical prominence (drop). For a general list of mountains, with height and prominence ranking, see List of mountains of Switzerland.

The list includes all eight ultra-prominent peaks of Switzerland as well as several canton high points.

== List ==
| Rank | Mountain | Height (m) | Isolation (km) | Drop (m) | Coordinates | Range | Canton(s) |
|---|---|---|---|---|---|---|---|
| 1 | Piz Bernina | 4048 | 137.8 | 2236 | 46°22′56″N 09°54′29″E | Bernina Range | Graubünden |
| 2 | Monte Rosa | 4634 | 78.3 | 2165 | 45°56′13″N 07°52′01″E | Pennine Alps | Valais |
| 3 | Finsteraarhorn | 4274 | 51.7 | 2279 | 46°32′15″N 08°07′34″E | Bernese Alps | Bern/Valais |
| 4 | Chasseral | 1606 | 49.5 | 666 | 47°09′59″N 07°03′34″E | Jura Mountains | Bern |
| 5 | Tödi | 3614 | 42.1 | 1570 | 46°48′40″N 08°54′53″E | Glarus Alps | Glarus/Graubünden |
| 6 | Mont Tendre | 1679 | 38.7 | 451 | 46°35′41″N 06°18′36″E | Jura Mountains | Vaud |
| 7 | Rheinwaldhorn | 3402 | 35.1 | 1337 | 46°29′37″N 09°02′24″E | Lepontine Alps | Graubünden/Ticino |
| 8 | Le Chasseron | 1607 | 32.0 | 590 | 46°51′06″N 06°32′19″E | Jura Mountains | Vaud |
| 9 | Schesaplana | 2964 | 30.3 | 826 | 47°03′14″N 09°42′26″E | Rätikon | Graubünden |
| 10 | Ringelspitz | 3248 | 29.8 | 844 | 46°53′59″N 09°20′39″E | Glarus Alps | Graubünden/St. Gallen |
| 11 | Hasenmatt | 1445 | 29.6 | 618 | 47°14′31″N 07°27′02″E | Jura Mountains | Solothurn |
| 12 | Grand Combin | 4309 | 26.4 | 1512 | 45°56′15″N 07°17′57″E | Pennine Alps | Valais |
| 13 | Säntis | 2502 | 25.7 | 2021 | 47°14′58″N 09°20′36″E | Appenzell Alps | Appenzell A./Appenzell I./St. Gallen |
| 14 | Piz Linard | 3410 | 24.9 | 1027 | 46°47′56″N 10°04′17″E | Silvretta Alps | Graubünden |
| 15 | Piz Kesch | 3418 | 22.9 | 1503 | 46°37′17″N 09°52′21″E | Albula Alps | Graubünden |
| 16 | Wildhorn | 3250 | 22.9 | 981 | 46°21′17″N 07°21′39″E | Bernese Alps | Bern/Valais |
| 17 | Dammastock | 3630 | 21.6 | 1466 | 46°38′37″N 08°25′16″E | Uri Alps | Bern/Uri |
| 18 | Piz Sesvenna | 3204 | 21.5 | 1055 | 46°42′22″N 10°24′11″E | Sesvenna Alps | Graubünden |
| 19 | Dents du Midi | 3257 | 19.0 | 1796 | 46°09′40″N 06°55′24″E | Chablais Alps | Valais |
| 20 | Cornettes de Bise | 2432 | 18.2 | 1063 | 46°19′57″N 06°47′04″E | Chablais Alps | Valais |
| 21 | Pizzo Campo Tencia | 3072 | 17.5 | 754 | 46°25′47″N 08°43′34″E | Lepontine Alps | Ticino |
| 22 | Pizzo Tambo | 3279 | 16.9 | 1164 | 46°29′49″N 09°17′00″E | Oberhalbstein Alps | Graubünden |
| 23 | Dom | 4546 | 16.8 | 1047 | 46°05′42″N 07°51′36″E | Pennine Alps | Valais |
| 24 | Pilatus | 2128 | 16.7 | 585 | 46°58′26″N 08°14′28″E | Emmental Alps | Nidwalden/Obwalden |
| 25 | Piz Calderas | 3397 | 16.5 | 1085 | 46°32′11″N 09°41′46″E | Albula Alps | Graubünden |
| 26 | Lägern | 866 | 16.4 | 425 | 47°28′54″N 08°23′41″E | Jura Mountains | Zurich |
| 27 | Lindenberg | 878 | 16.3 | 358 | 47°15′13″N 08°17′35″E | Lindenberg | Lucerne |
| 28 | Seerücken (Büürer Holz) | 721 | 16.1 | 268 | 47°38′56″N 09°02′00″E | Seerücken | Thurgau |
| 29 | Fluchthorn | 3396 | 15.6 | 646 | 46°53′27″N 10°13′39″E | Silvretta Alps | Graubünden |
| 30 | Piz Medel | 3210 | 15.4 | 942 | 46°37′05″N 08°54′40″E | Lepontine Alps | Graubünden/Ticino |
| 31 | Piz Murtaröl | 3180 | 15.1 | 679 | 46°34′14″N 10°17′15″E | Ortler Alps | Graubünden |
| 32 | Le Soliat | 1464 | 14.9 | 204 | 46°55′43″N 06°43′29″E | Jura Mountains | Neuchâtel |
| 33 | Irchel | 694 | 14.9 | 260 | 47°32′22″N 08°36′26″E | Jura Mountains | Zurich |
| 34 | Gridone | 2188 | 14.4 | 1218 | 46°07′24″N 08°38′53″E | Lepontine Alps | Ticino |
| 35 | Monte Generoso | 1701 | 14.4 | 1321 | 45°55′53″N 09°01′12″E | Lugano Prealps | Ticino |
| 36 | Diablerets | 3216 | 14.3 | 974 | 46°18′14″N 07°11′21″E | Bernese Alps | Valais/Vaud |
| 37 | Glärnisch | 2915 | 14.3 | 967 | 46°59′55″N 08°59′55″E | Schwyz Alps | Glarus |
| 38 | La Dôle | 1677 | 13.9 | 355 | 46°25′30″N 06°05′58″E | Jura Mountains | Vaud |
| 39 | Matterhorn | 4478 | 13.8 | 1043 | 45°58′35″N 07°39′30″E | Pennine Alps | Valais |
| 40 | Bruschghorn | 3056 | 13.8 | 577 | 46°37′52″N 09°18′24″E | Lepontine Alps | Graubünden |
| 41 | Chutzen | 820 | 13.6 | 261 | 47°00′53″N 07°19′26″E | Chutzen | Bern |
| 42 | Aroser Rothorn | 2980 | 13.5 | 1349 | 46°44′16″N 09°36′50″E | Plessur Alps | Graubünden |
| 43 | Bietschhorn | 3934 | 13.4 | 807 | 46°23′29″N 07°51′03″E | Bernese Alps | Valais |
| 44 | Monte Tamaro | 1962 | 13.3 | 1408 | 46°06′14″N 08°51′58″E | Lugano Prealps | Ticino |
| 45 | Rigi | 1797 | 13.1 | 1288 | 47°03′24″N 08°29′08″E | Schwyz Alps | Schwyz |
| 46 | Aletschhorn | 4194 | 12.9 | 1043 | 46°27′54″N 07°59′37″E | Bernese Alps | Valais |
| 47 | Blinnenhorn | 3374 | 12.8 | 945 | 46°25′33″N 08°18′29″E | Lepontine Alps | Valais |
| 48 | Oberalpstock | 3328 | 12.7 | 709 | 46°44′33″N 08°46′10″E | Glarus Alps | Graubünden/Uri |
| 49 | Balmhorn | 3697 | 12.3 | 1020 | 46°25′30″N 07°41′37″E | Bernese Alps | Bern/Valais |
| 50 | Schafberg | 2239 | 11.8 | 735 | 46°38′13″N 07°19′01″E | Bernese Alps | Bern/Fribourg |
| 51 | Monte Leone | 3553 | 11.7 | 1144 | 46°14′59″N 08°06′37″E | Lepontine Alps | Valais |
| 52 | Piz Platta | 3392 | 11.7 | 1108 | 46°29′13″N 09°33′42″E | Oberhalbstein Alps | Graubünden |
| 53 | Muttler | 3293 | 11.5 | 703 | 46°54′02″N 10°22′43″E | Samnaun Alps | Graubünden |
| 54 | Weissfluh | 2843 | 11.5 | 497 | 46°50′07″N 09°47′40″E | Plessur Alps | Graubünden |
| 55 | Gamsberg | 2385 | 11.5 | 1358 | 47°08′07″N 09°22′28″E | Appenzell Alps | St. Gallen |
| 56 | Weisshorn | 4505 | 11.0 | 1234 | 46°06′06″N 07°42′58″E | Pennine Alps | Valais |
| 57 | Weissmies | 4013 | 11.0 | 1183 | 46°07′40″N 08°00′43″E | Pennine Alps | Valais |
| 58 | Bürglen (Albis) | 915 | 11.0 | 375 | 47°15′28″N 08°32′14″E | Albis | Zurich |
| 59 | Basòdino | 3273 | 10.9 | 960 | 46°24′42″N 08°28′07″E | Lepontine Alps | Ticino |
| 60 | Mont Racine | 1439 | 10.8 | 319 | 47°01′19″N 06°48′58″E | Jura Mountains | Neuchâtel |
| 61 | Napf | 1408 | 10.5 | 552 | 47°00′15″N 07°56′24″E | Emmental Alps | Bern/Lucerne |
| 62 | Piz Quattervals | 3165 | 10.4 | 471 | 46°37′38″N 10°05′42″E | Livigno Alps | Graubünden |
| 63 | Vanil Noir | 2389 | 10.4 | 1110 | 46°31′43″N 07°08′54″E | Bernese Alps | Fribourg/Vaud |
| 64 | Piz Pisoc | 3173 | 10.3 | 922 | 46°44′40″N 10°16′47″E | Sesvenna Alps | Graubünden |
| 64 | Pizzo Paglia | 2593 | 10.3 | 498 | 46°13′55″N 09°13′09″E | Lepontine Alps | Graubünden |
| 66 | Montagne du Château | 929 | 10.3 | 249 | 46°34′51″N 06°42′57″E | Jorat | Vaud |
| 67 | Mont Vully | 653 | 10.3 | 173 | 46°57′50″N 07°05′38″E | Mont Vully | Fribourg |
| 68 | Piz Timun | 3209 | 10.2 | 823 | 46°28′01″N 09°24′34″E | Oberhalbstein Alps | Graubünden |
| 69 | Pizzo Rotondo | 3192 | 10.0 | 752 | 46°31′01″N 08°27′57″E | Lepontine Alps | Ticino/Valais |
