= Chutzen =

Mountain in Switzerland

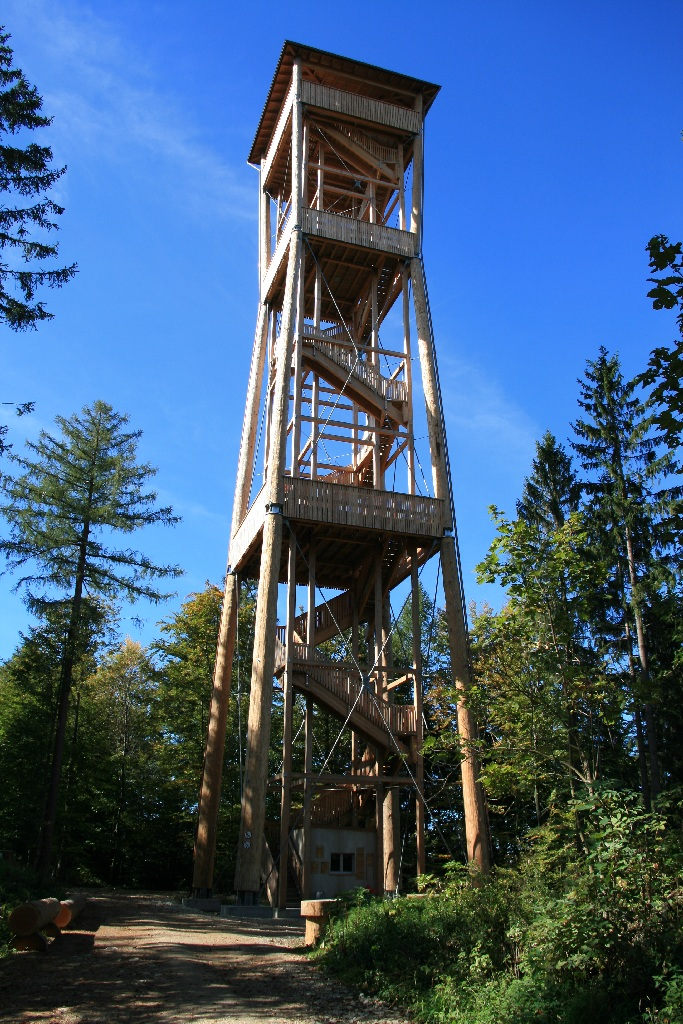
- The Chutzenturm on the summit

Highest point
- Elevation: 820 m (2,690 ft)
- Prominence: 261 m (856 ft)
- Isolation: 13.6 km (8.5 mi)
- Coordinates: 47°00′53″N 07°19′26″E

Geography
- Location within Switzerland
- Location: Bern, Switzerland

Climbing
- Easiest route: Trail

The Chutzen (or Chutze; 820 m) is a wooded hill of the Swiss Plateau, located halfway between Lake Biel and Bern. It lies south of the village of Frienisberg and belongs to the municipality of Seedorf. On the summit lies a 45-metre-high wooden tower, the Chutzenturm, which opened in June 2010.

== See also ==
- List of most isolated mountains of Switzerland
- List of mountains of Switzerland accessible by public transport
