= Le Noirmont (mountain) =

Mountain in Switzerland

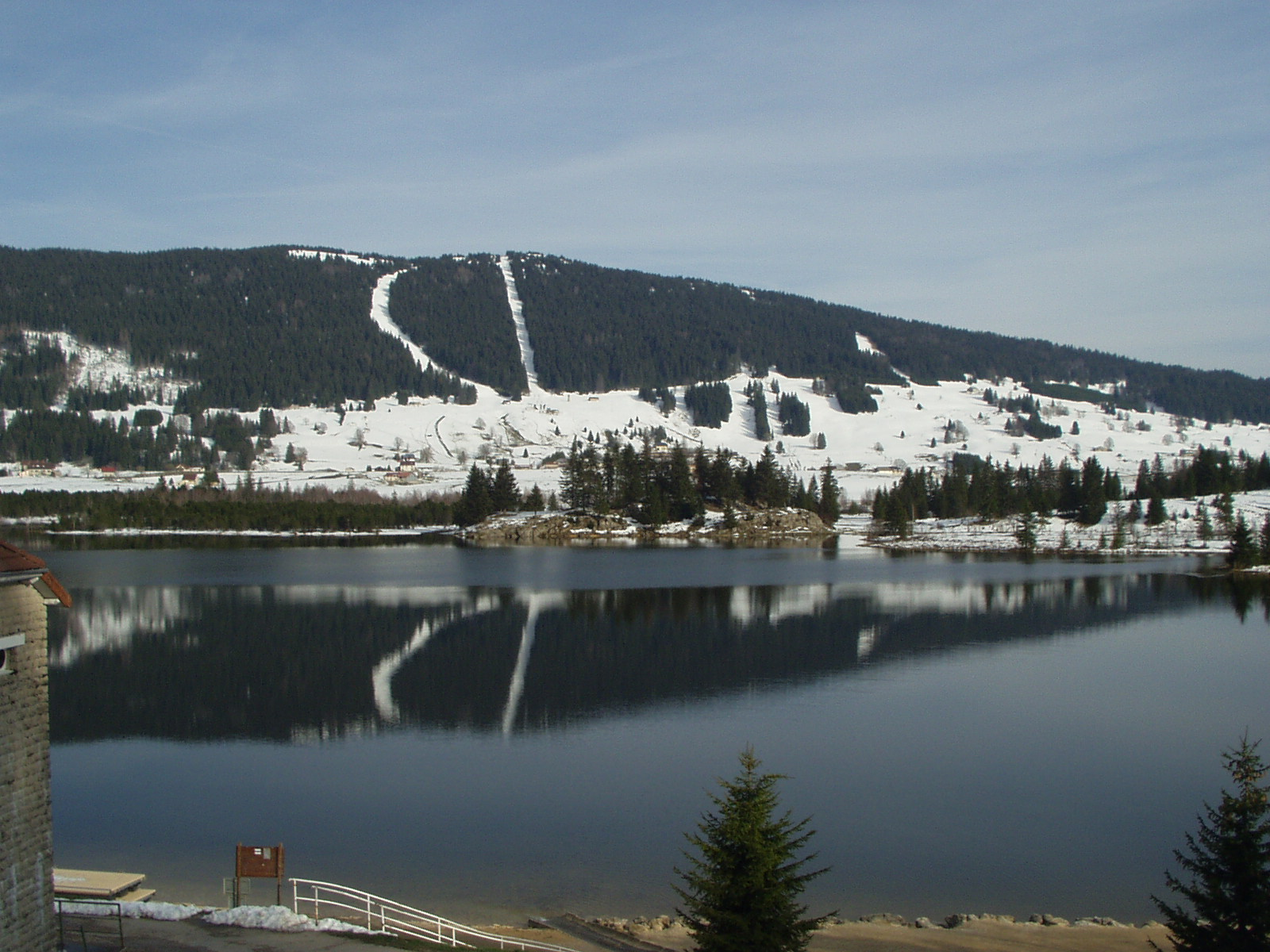
- View from the Lac des Rousses

Highest point
- Elevation: 1,567 m (5,141 ft)
- Prominence: 237 m (778 ft)
- Parent peak: Mont Tendre
- Coordinates: 46°29′03″N 06°06′57″E

Geography
- Location within Switzerland
- Location: Vaud, Switzerland
- Parent range: Jura Mountains

Le Noirmont (the black mountain) is a mountain of the Jura, located north of Saint-Cergue in the canton of Vaud. At 1,567 metres, it is the highest mountain between the Col de la Givrine and Mont Tendre. Although Le Noirmont is wholly in Switzerland, the border with France runs on the western base of the mountain.

The closest localities are La Cure and Les Rousses.
