= Dent Favre =

Mountain in Switzerland

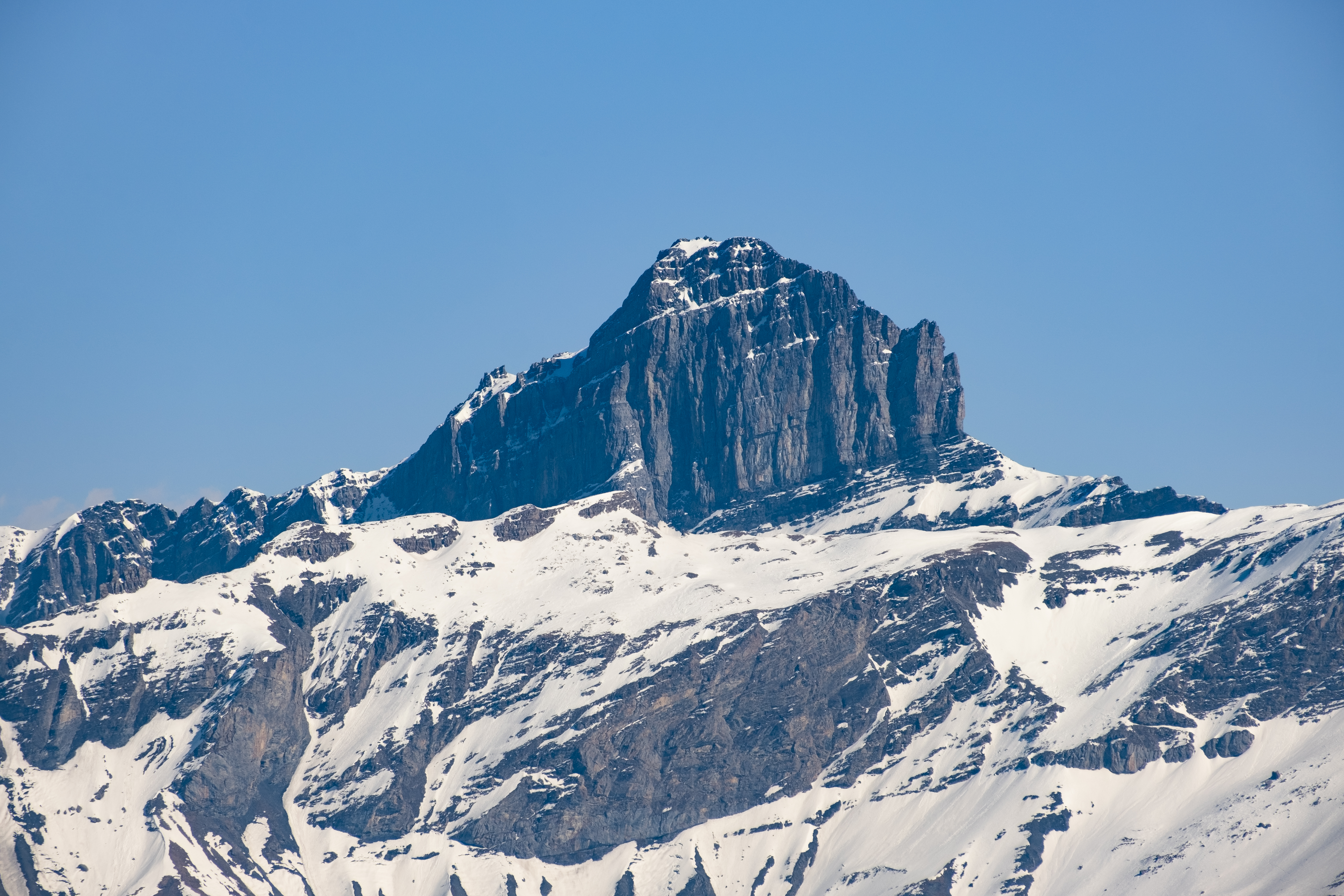
- Dent Favre as seen from the Pointe de Bellevue

Highest point
- Elevation: 2,917 m (9,570 ft)
- Prominence: 316 m (1,037 ft)
- Parent peak: Dent de Morcles
- Coordinates: 46°12′37″N 7°06′12.3″E

Geography
- Location within Switzerland
- Location: Valais/Vaud, Switzerland
- Parent range: Bernese Alps

The Dent Favre is a mountain in the Bernese Alps, located between the Dent de Morcles and the Grand Muveran. Its summit straddles the border between the Swiss cantons of Vaud and Valais.
