= Cape au Moine (2352 m) =

Mountain in Switzerland

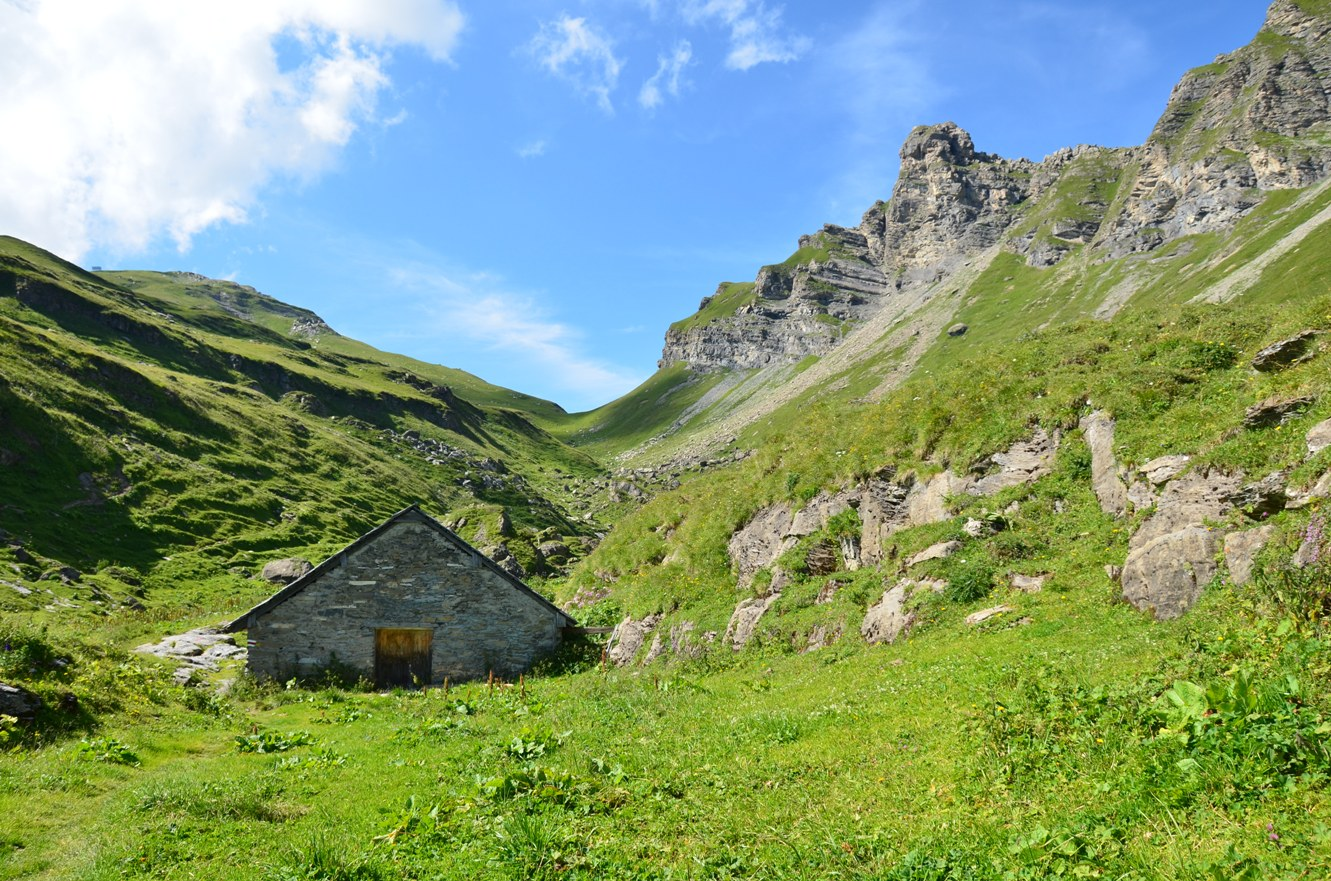
- View from the south

Highest point
- Elevation: 2,352 m (7,717 ft)
- Prominence: 199 m (653 ft)
- Parent peak: Le Tarent
- Coordinates: 46°22′50″N 07°10′16″E

Geography
- Location within Switzerland
- Location: Vaud, Switzerland
- Parent range: Bernese Alps

The Cape au Moine (2,352 m) is a mountain of the Bernese Alps, located between L'Etivaz and Les Diablerets in the canton of Vaud. It lies east of La Para.

It should not be confused with a nearby peak of the same name on the border of the cantons of Vaud and Fribourg; this other Cap de Moine, located in the Swiss Prealps just north of the Rocher de Naye and Col de Jaman, is smaller (1941m) but is visible from many populated areas around Lake Geneva.
