= Tête à Pierre Grept =

Mountain in Switzerland

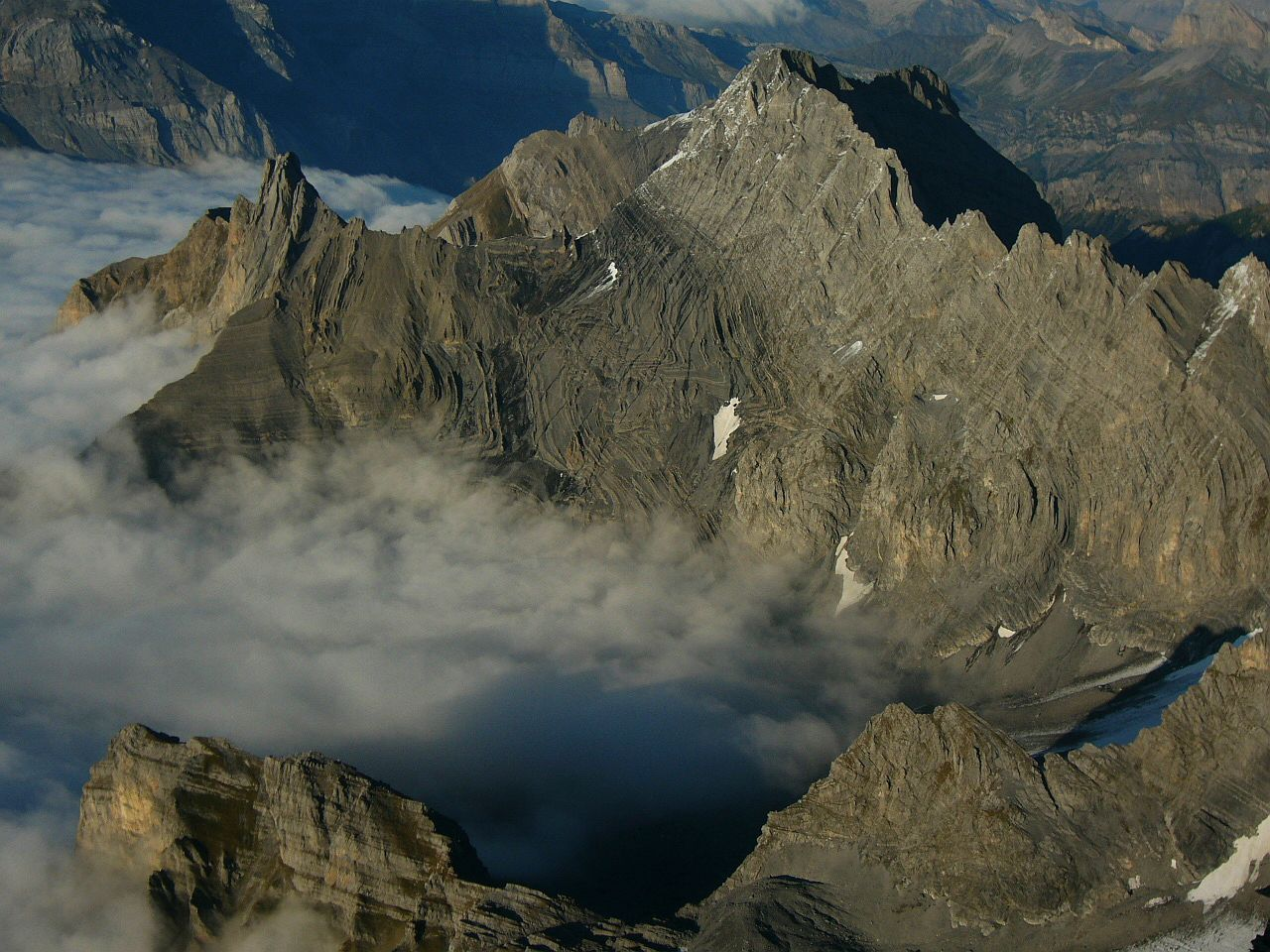
- The west side of the mountain

Highest point
- Elevation: 2,904 m (9,528 ft)
- Prominence: 165 m (541 ft)
- Parent peak: Grand Muveran
- Coordinates: 46°15′09.7″N 7°09′18.5″E

Geography
- Location within Switzerland
- Location: Vaud/Valais, Switzerland
- Parent range: Bernese Alps

The Tête à Pierre Grept is a mountain in the Bernese Alps, located between the cantons of Vaud and Valais. It is situated in the region between the Grand Muveran and Pas de Cheville. On the northern side lies the small Glacier de Paneirosse.
