= Leytron =

- Municipality
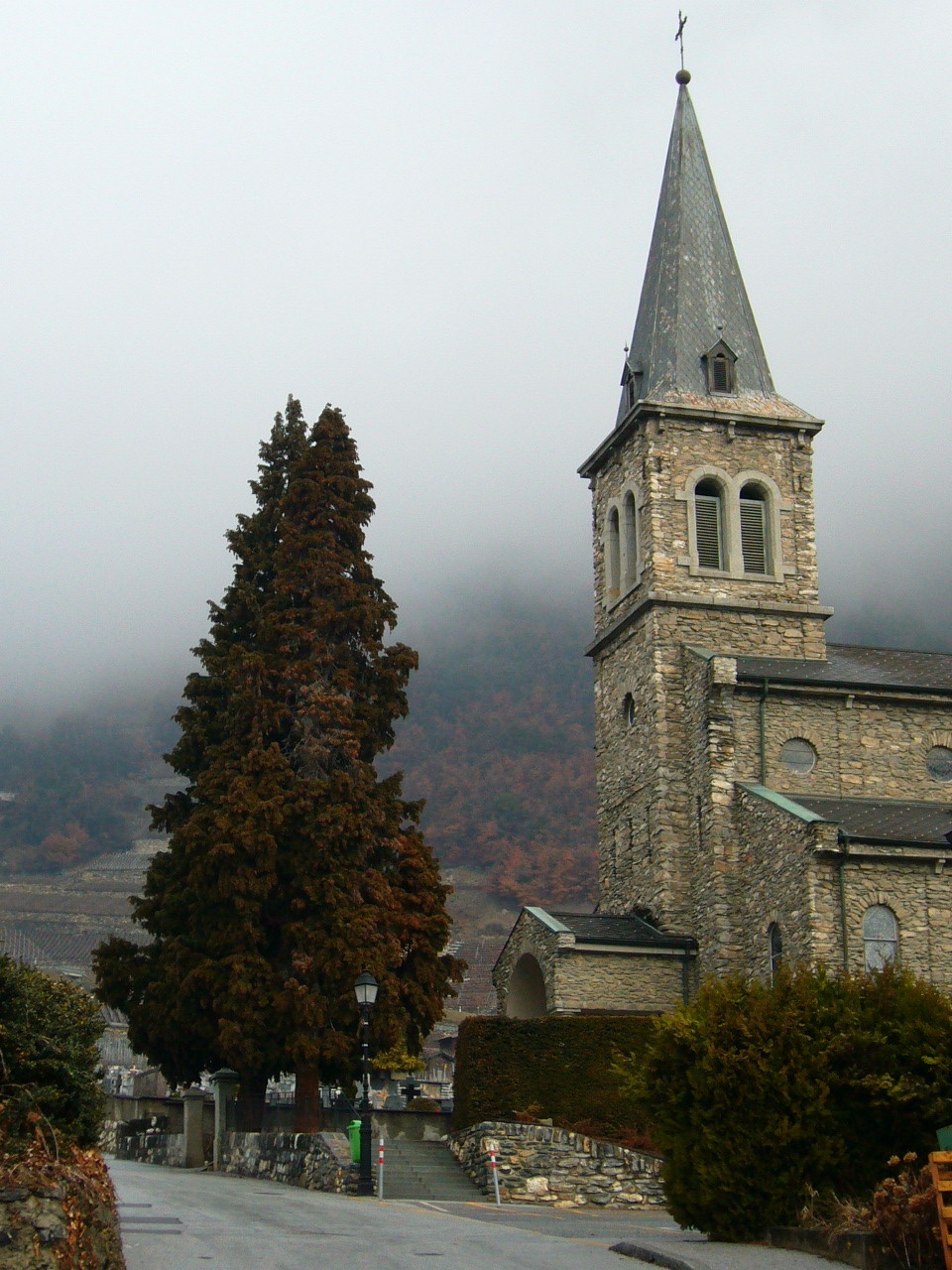

- Flag Coat of arms
- Location of Leytron
- Location within Switzerland Location within Canton of Valais
- Coordinates: 46°11′N 7°12′E
- Country: Switzerland
- Canton: Valais
- District: Martigny

Government
  - Mayor: Patrice Martinet

Area
  - Total: 26.9 km^{2} (10.4 sq mi)
- Elevation: 485 m (1,591 ft)

Population (December 2002)
  - Total: 2,190
  - Density: 81.4/km^{2} (211/sq mi)
- Time zone: UTC+01:00 (CET)
  - Summer (DST): UTC+02:00 (CEST)
- Postal code: 1912
- SFOS number: 6135
- ISO 3166 code: CH-VS
- Surrounded by: Bex (VD), Chamoson, Fully, Riddes, Saillon
- Website: www.leytron.ch

Leytron is a municipality in the district of Martigny in the canton of Valais in Switzerland.

== History ==
Leytron is first mentioned in 1219 as Leitrun.

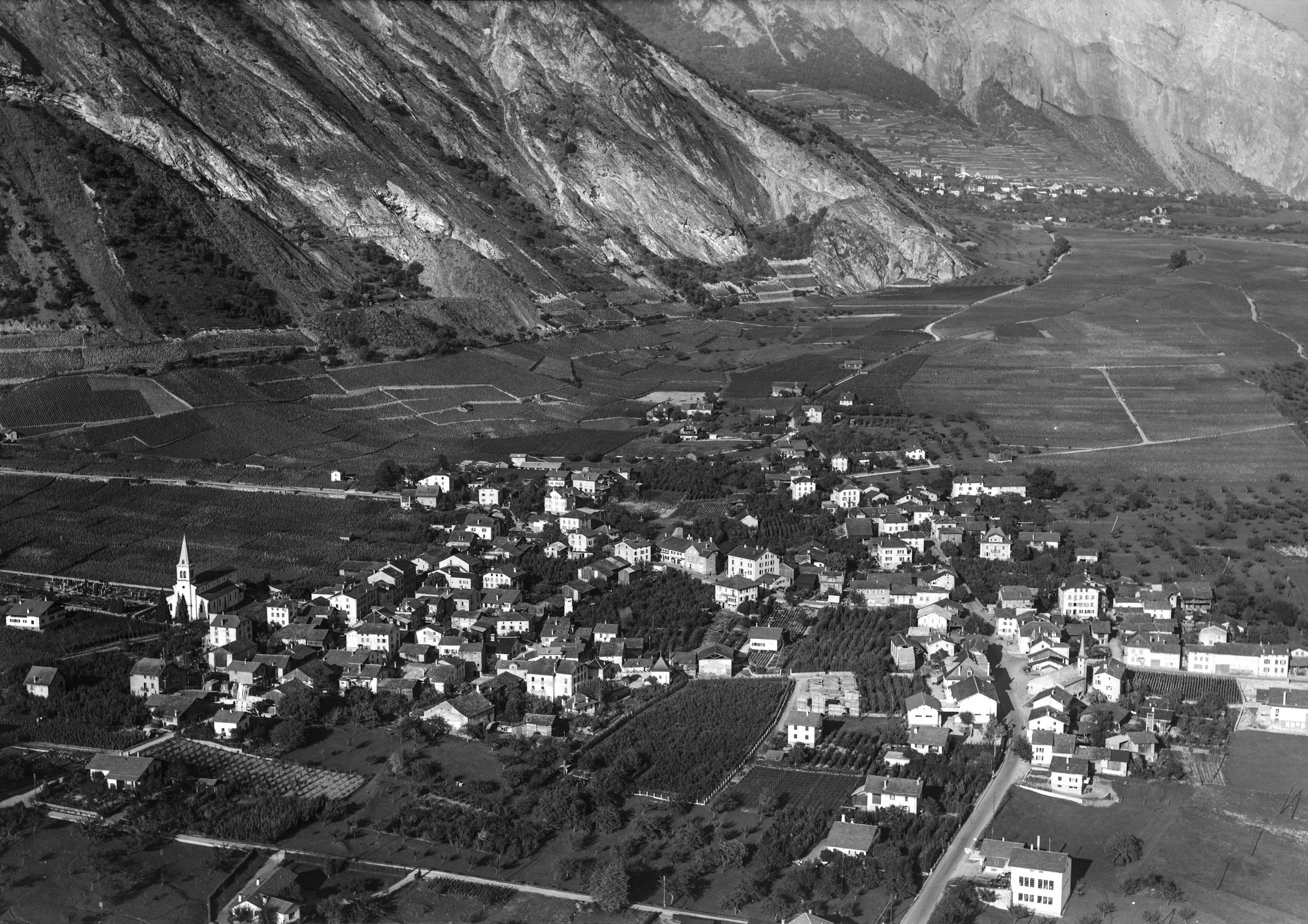
Historic aerial photograph by Werner Friedli from 1955

== Geography ==
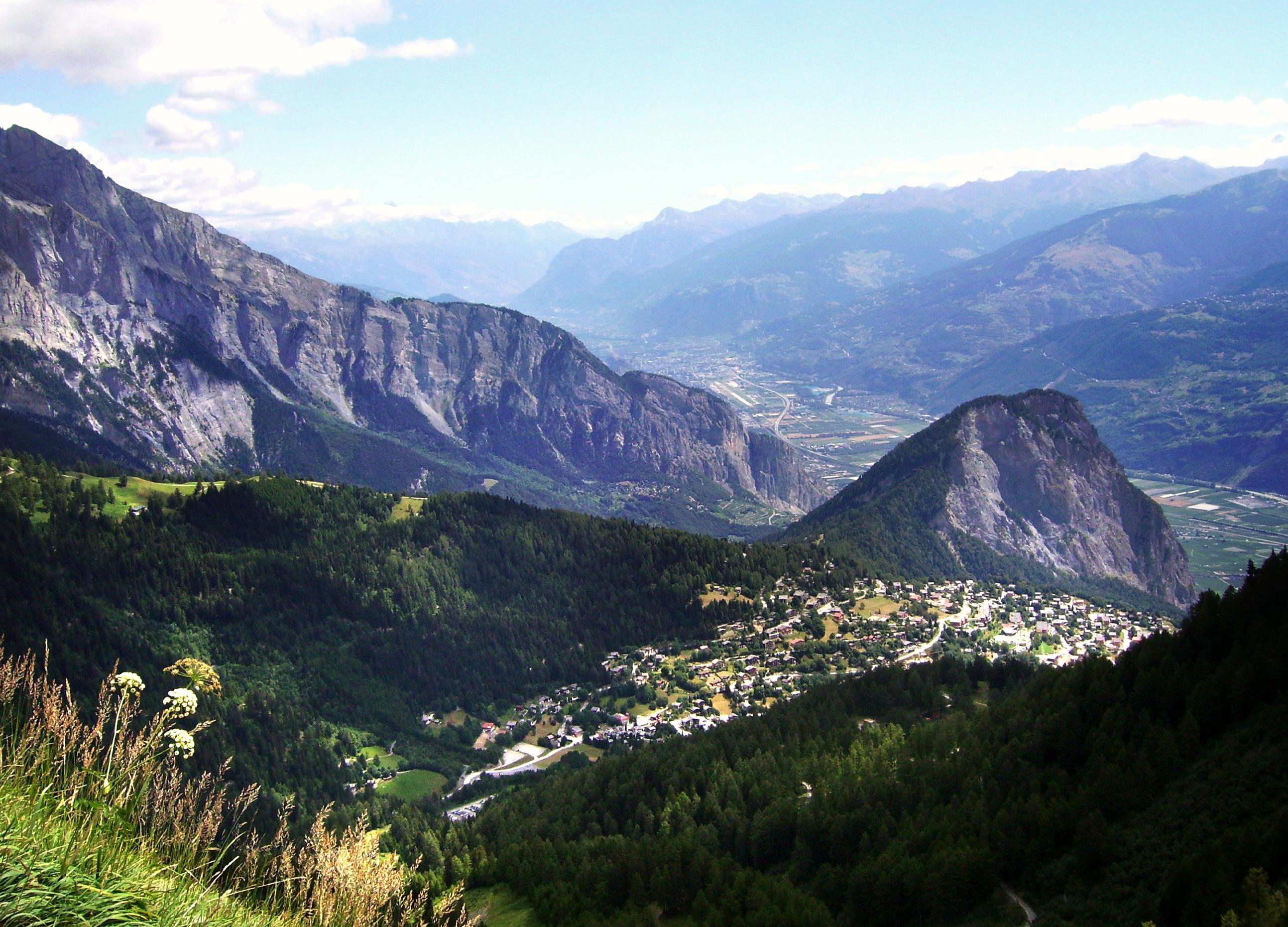
Ovronnaz village

Leytron has an area, as of 2009, of 26.9 square kilometers (10.4 mi^{2}). Of this area, 7.27 km^{2} (2.81 mi^{2}) or 27.1% is used for agricultural purposes, while 8.09 km^{2} (3.12 mi^{2}) or 30.1% is forested. Of the rest of the land, 1.68 km^{2} (0.65 mi^{2}) or 6.3% is settled (buildings or roads), 0.15 km^{2} (37 acres) or 0.6% is either rivers or lakes and 9.73 km^{2} (3.76 mi^{2}) or 36.2% is unproductive land.

Of the built up area, housing and buildings made up 3.6% and transportation infrastructure made up 1.9%. Out of the forested land, 25.0% of the total land area is heavily forested and 3.8% is covered with orchards or small clusters of trees. Of the agricultural land, 0.4% is used for growing crops and 1.8% is pastures, while 11.0% is used for orchards or vine crops and 13.9% is used for alpine pastures. All the water in the municipality is flowing water. Of the unproductive areas, 12.0% is unproductive vegetation and 24.2% is too rocky for vegetation.

The municipality is located in the Martigny district. It consists of the hamlets of Leytron-Plan, Produit, Montagnon, Les Places, Dugny and Le Fou, which are at elevations of 497–1,041 meters (1,631–3,415 ft) and the settlement of Ovronnaz at 1,350 m (4,430 ft).

== Coat of arms ==
The blazon of the municipal coat of arms is Vert between two Mullets of Five Or in chief on a Pale Or four Chevronnels Sable.

== Demographics ==
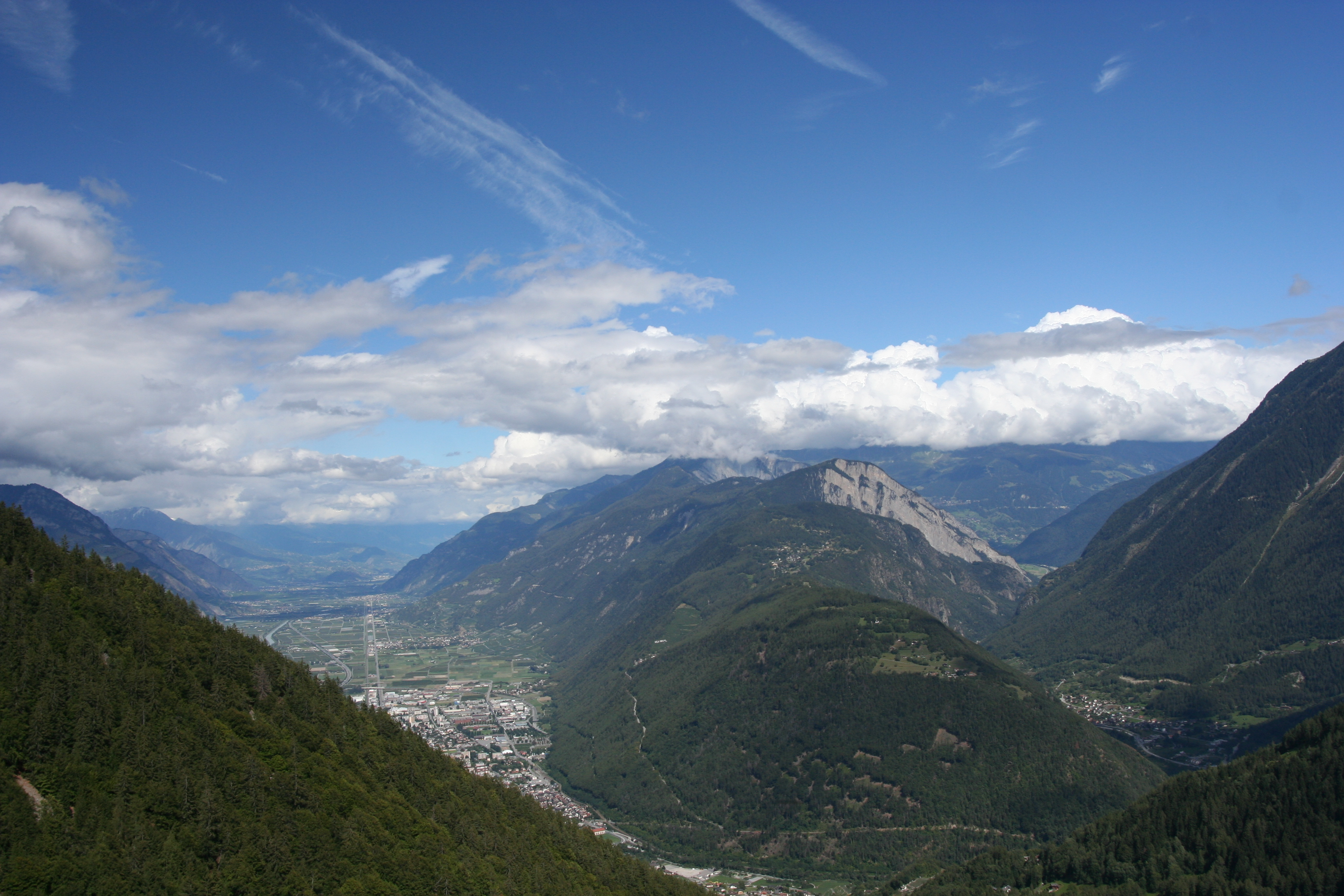
Leytron village

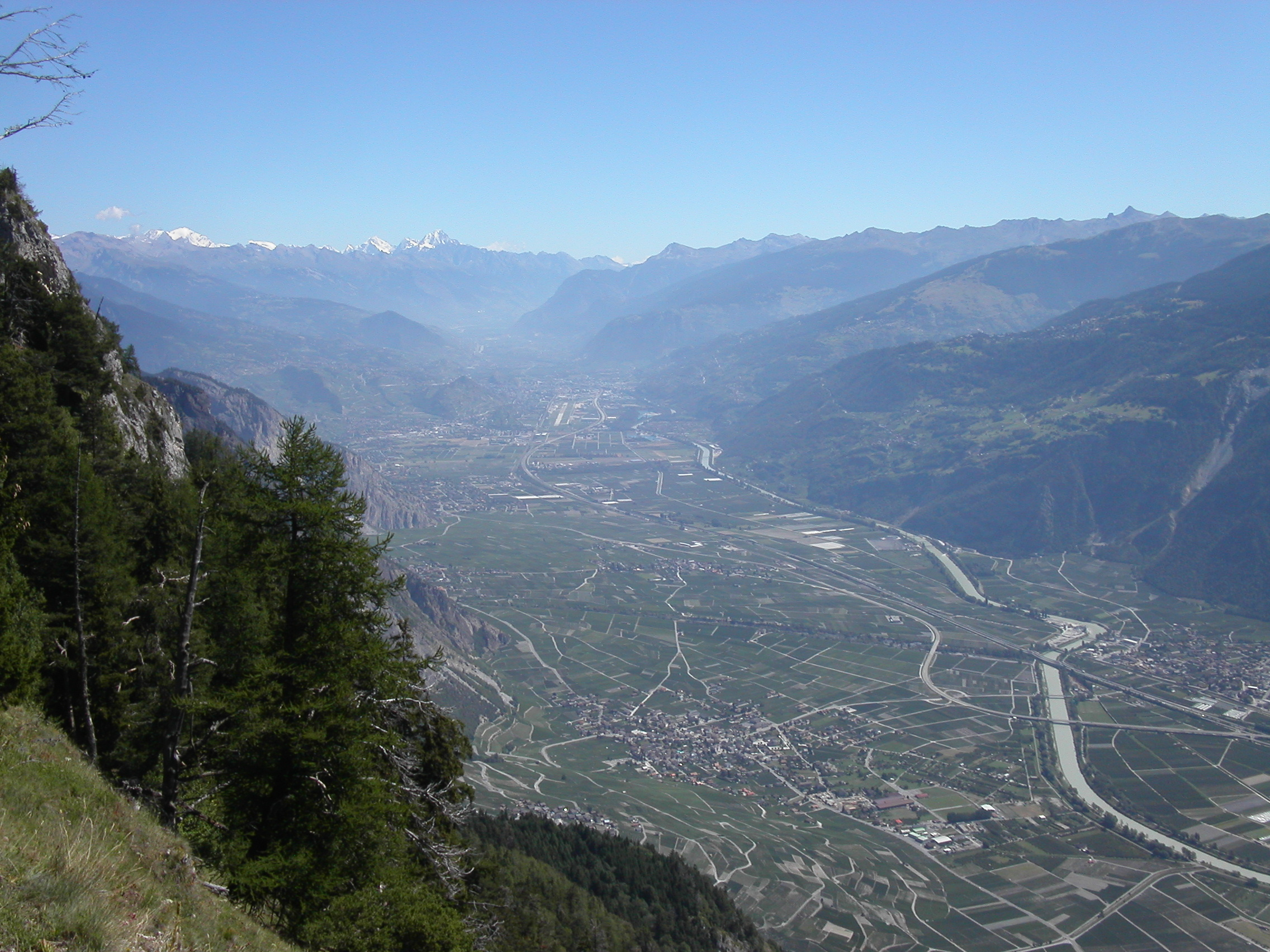
Leytron village and surrounding farms

Leytron has a population (as of December 2020) of 3,230. As of 2008, 16.3% of the population are resident foreign nationals. Over the last 10 years (2000–2010 ) the population has changed at a rate of 24.3%. It has changed at a rate of 23.2% due to migration and at a rate of -1.4% due to births and deaths.

Most of the population (as of 2000) speaks French (1,979 or 93.0%) as their first language, Portuguese is the second most common (72 or 3.4%) and German is the third (28 or 1.3%). There are 17 people who speak Italian.

As of 2008, the gender distribution of the population was 47.7% male and 52.3% female. The population was made up of 1,027 Swiss men (38.9% of the population) and 230 (8.7%) non-Swiss men. There were 1,151 Swiss women (43.6%) and 229 (8.7%) non-Swiss women. Of the population in the municipality 1,283 or about 60.3% were born in Leytron and lived there in 2000. There were 420 or 19.7% who were born in the same canton, while 178 or 8.4% were born somewhere else in Switzerland, and 244 or 11.5% were born outside of Switzerland.

The age distribution of the population (as of 2000) is children and teenagers (0–19 years old) make up 21% of the population, while adults (20–64 years old) make up 61% and seniors (over 64 years old) make up 18%.

As of 2000, there were 811 people who were single and never married in the municipality. There were 1,079 married individuals, 158 widows or widowers and 80 individuals who are divorced.

As of 2000, there were 887 private households in the municipality, and an average of 2.3 persons per household. There were 273 households that consist of only one person and 54 households with five or more people. In 2000, a total of 868 apartments (45.7% of the total) were permanently occupied, while 902 apartments (47.4%) were seasonally occupied and 131 apartments (6.9%) were empty. As of 2009, the construction rate of new housing units was 21.6 new units per 1000 residents. The vacancy rate for the municipality, in 2010, was 1.7%.

The historical population is given in the following chart:

== Politics ==
In the 2007 federal election the most popular party was the CVP which received 42.45% of the vote. The next three most popular parties were the FDP (29.2%), the SVP (17.07%) and the SP (5.72%). In the federal election, a total of 1,149 votes were cast, and the voter turnout was 65.2%.

In the 2009 Conseil d'État/Staatsrat election a total of 1,168 votes were cast, of which 63 or about 5.4% were invalid. The voter participation was 65.8%, which is much more than the cantonal average of 54.67%. In the 2007 Swiss Council of States election a total of 1,147 votes were cast, of which 64 or about 5.6% were invalid. The voter participation was 65.7%, which is much more than the cantonal average of 59.88%.

== Economy ==
As of 2010, Leytron had an unemployment rate of 4.5%. As of 2008, there were 334 people employed in the primary economic sector and about 106 businesses involved in this sector. 207 people were employed in the secondary sector and there were 24 businesses in this sector. 779 people were employed in the tertiary sector, with 85 businesses in this sector. There were 1,086 residents of the municipality who were employed in some capacity, of which females made up 44.0% of the workforce.

In 2008 the total number of full-time equivalent jobs was 913. The number of jobs in the primary sector was 160, of which 152 were in agriculture and 8 were in forestry or lumber production. The number of jobs in the secondary sector was 196 of which 81 or (41.3%) were in manufacturing, 2 or (1.0%) were in mining and 113 (57.7%) were in construction. The number of jobs in the tertiary sector was 557. In the tertiary sector; 97 or 17.4% were in wholesale or retail sales or the repair of motor vehicles, 25 or 4.5% were in the movement and storage of goods, 250 or 44.9% were in a hotel or restaurant, 11 or 2.0% were the insurance or financial industry, 17 or 3.1% were technical professionals or scientists, 40 or 7.2% were in education and 3 or 0.5% were in health care.

In 2000, there were 322 workers who commuted into the municipality and 487 workers who commuted away. The municipality is a net exporter of workers, with about 1.5 workers leaving the municipality for every one entering. Of the working population, 7.7% used public transportation to get to work, and 65.1% used a private car.

== Religion ==
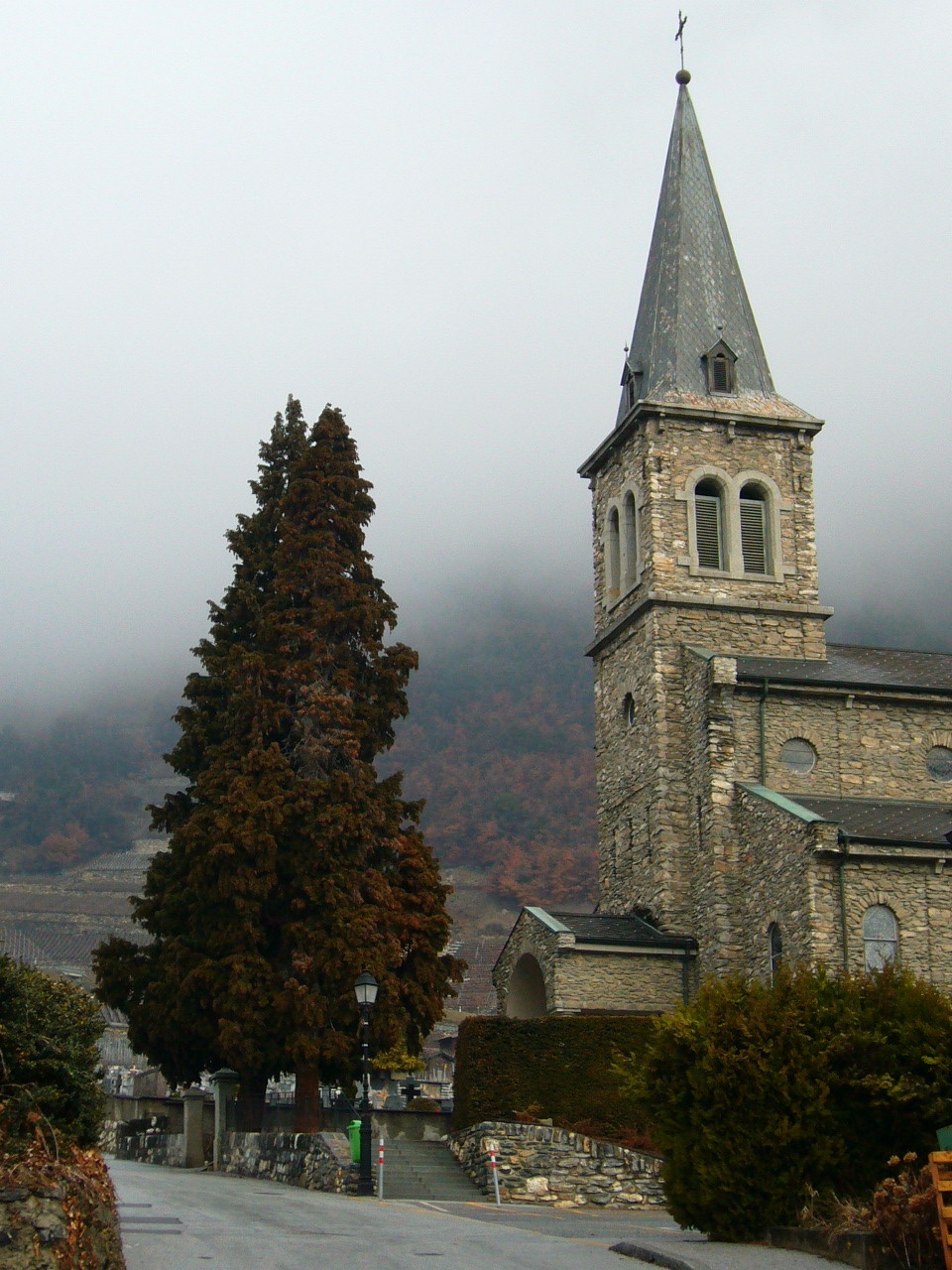
Church in Leytron

From the 2000 census, 1,958 or 92.0% were Roman Catholic, while 83 or 3.9% belonged to the Swiss Reformed Church. Of the rest of the population, there were 4 members of an Orthodox church (or about 0.19% of the population), and there were 12 individuals (or about 0.56% of the population) who belonged to another Christian church. There were 20 (or about 0.94% of the population) who were Islamic. There were 1 individual who belonged to another church. 48 (or about 2.26% of the population) belonged to no church, are agnostic or atheist, and 6 individuals (or about 0.28% of the population) did not answer the question.

== Education ==
In Leytron about 725 or (34.1%) of the population have completed non-mandatory upper secondary education, and 192 or (9.0%) have completed additional higher education (either university or a Fachhochschule). Of the 192 who completed tertiary schooling, 54.7% were Swiss men, 29.7% were Swiss women, 7.3% were non-Swiss men and 8.3% were non-Swiss women.

As of 2000, there were 166 students in Leytron who came from another municipality, while 72 residents attended schools outside the municipality.

Leytron is home to the Bibliothèque communale library. The library has (as of 2008) 7,800 books or other media, and loaned out 12,533 items in the same year. It was open a total of 121 days with average of 9 hours per week during that year.
