= Rocher du Midi =

Mountain in Switzerland

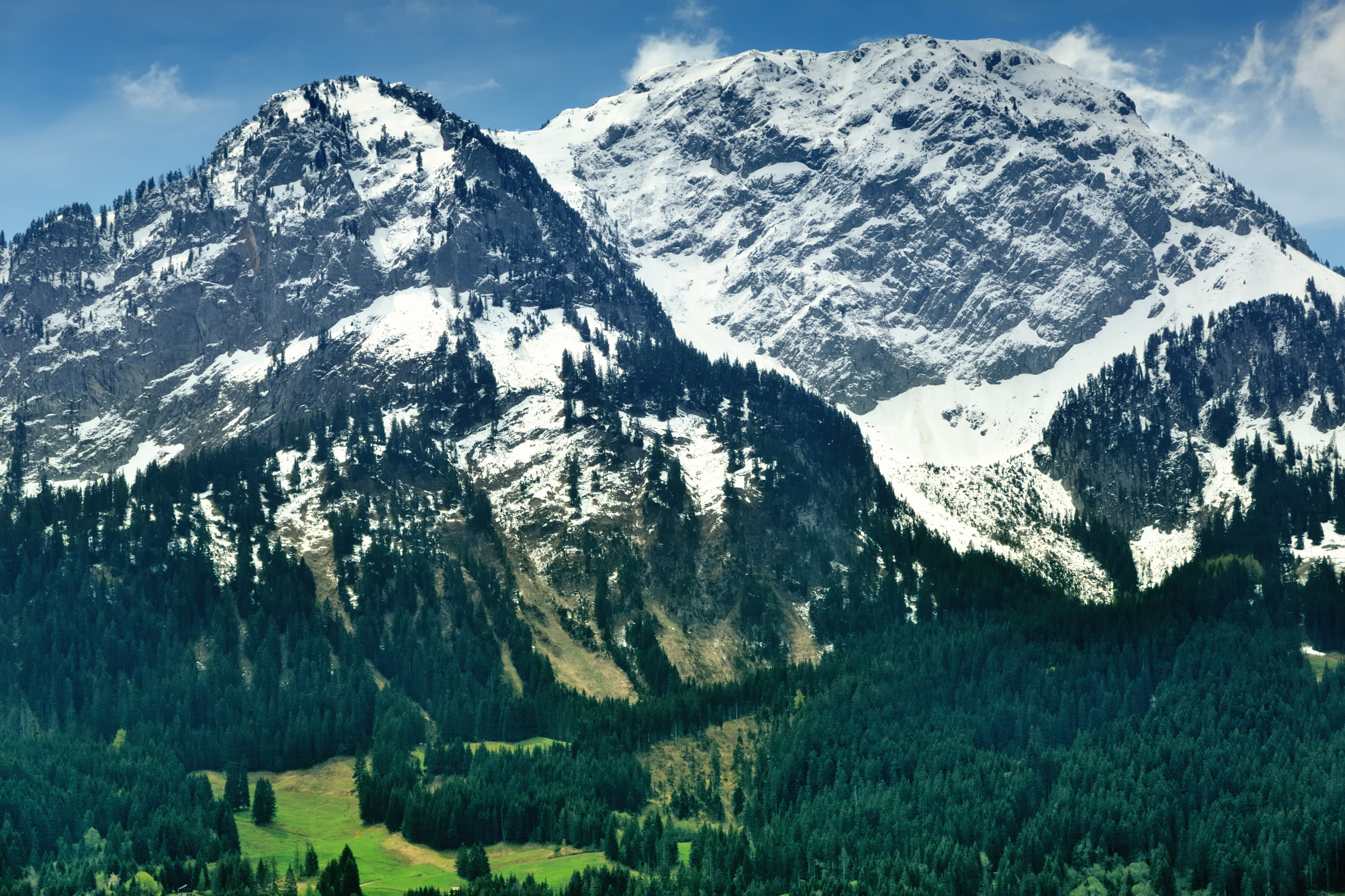
- View from the north

Highest point
- Elevation: 2,097 m (6,880 ft)
- Prominence: 240 m (790 ft)
- Parent peak: Gummfluh
- Coordinates: 46°26′36.6″N 7°9′10.7″E

Geography
- Location within Switzerland
- Location: Vaud, Switzerland
- Parent range: Bernese Alps

The Rocher du Midi is a mountain in the western Bernese Alps, overlooking Château d'Oex in the canton of Vaud. It is located on the massif between the valley of the Sarine and L'Etivaz and culminating at the Gummfluh.

The summit is accessible by a trail via the Col de Base.
