= Petit Muveran =

Mountain in Switzerland

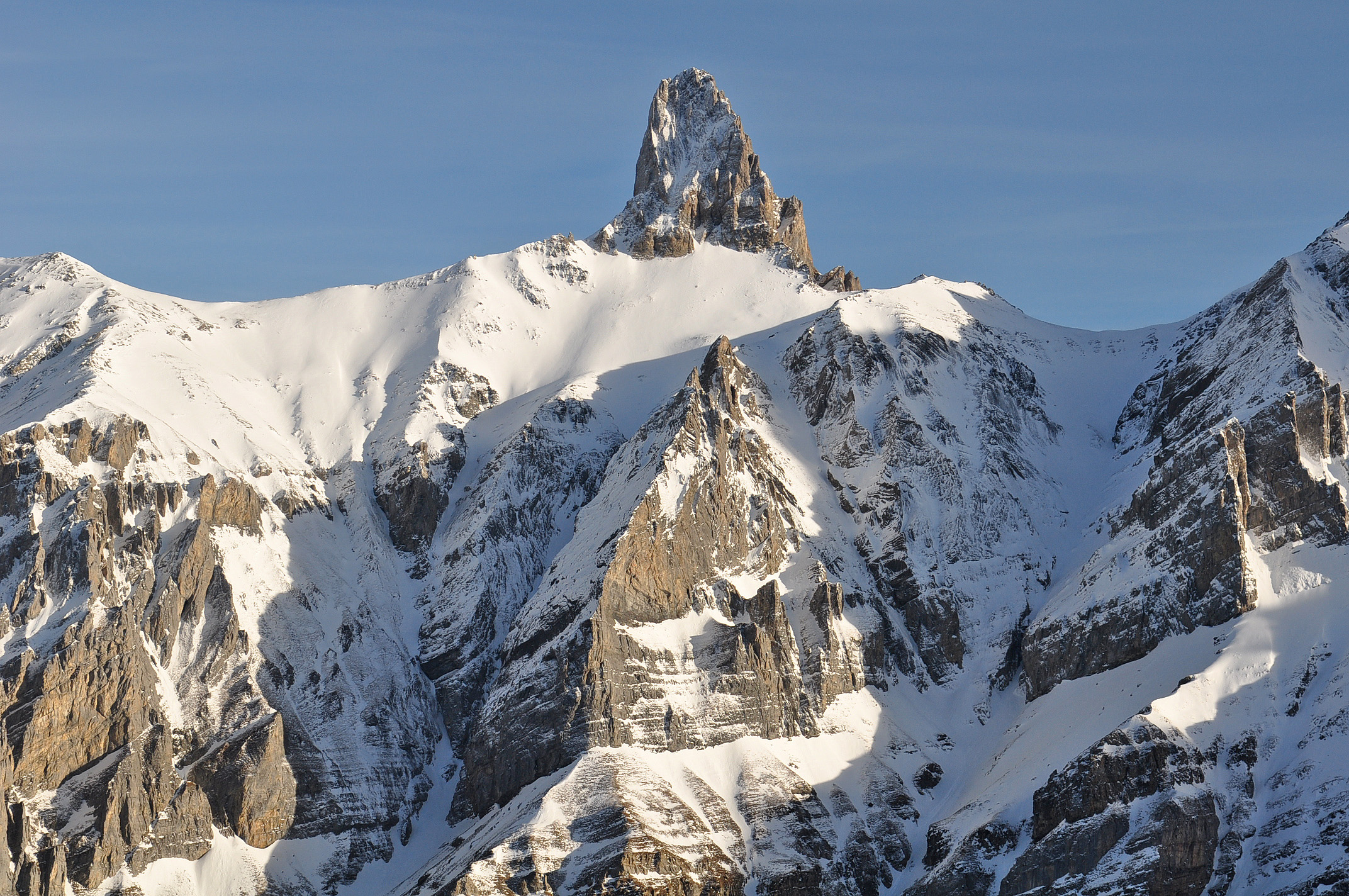
- The north side

Highest point
- Elevation: 2,810 m (9,220 ft)
- Prominence: 265 m (869 ft)
- Parent peak: Grand Muveran
- Coordinates: 46°13′24.6″N 7°07′21.3″E

Geography
- Location within Switzerland
- Location: Switzerland
- Parent range: Bernese Alps

The Petit Muveran (French pronunciation: [pəti myvʁɑ̃]) is a mountain in the Bernese Alps, overlooking Ovronnaz in Valais. The summit is located on the border between Vaud and Valais. As its name suggests, it is situated near the higher Grand Muveran.
