= Mont Tendre =

Mountain in Switzerland

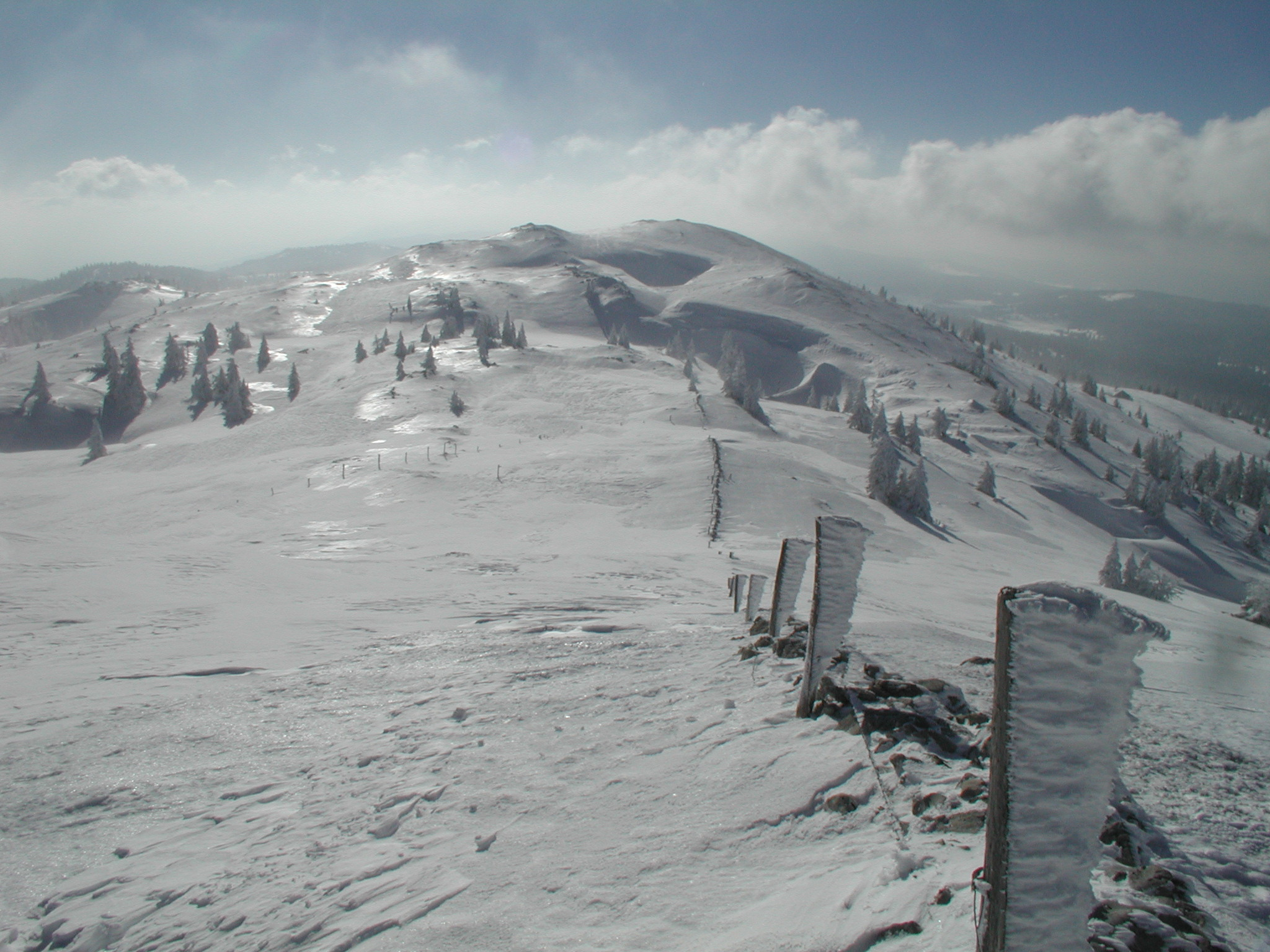
- View from the summit towards the southwest

Highest point
- Elevation: 1,679 m (5,509 ft)
- Prominence: 451 m (1,480 ft)
- Parent peak: Crêt de la Neige
- Isolation: 38.7 km (24.0 mi)
- Coordinates: 46°35′41″N 6°18′36″E

Geography
- Location within Switzerland
- Location: Vaud, Switzerland
- Parent range: Jura Mountains

Mont Tendre is a mountain of the Jura, located between the valley of Joux and the basin of Lake Geneva in the canton of Vaud. With an elevation of 1,679 metres above sea level, it is the highest summit of the Swiss portion of the Jura Mountains and, therefore, the highest summit of Switzerland outside the Alps. It is also the most isolated mountain of the canton. It is found in the community of Montricher.

A paved road from Montricher reaches a height of 1,615 metres, northeast of the summit. A restaurant is located at its end, the Chalet du Mont Tendre.

== See also ==
- List of mountains of Vaud
- List of mountains of Switzerland
- List of most isolated mountains of Switzerland
