= Le Chasseron =

Mountain in Switzerland

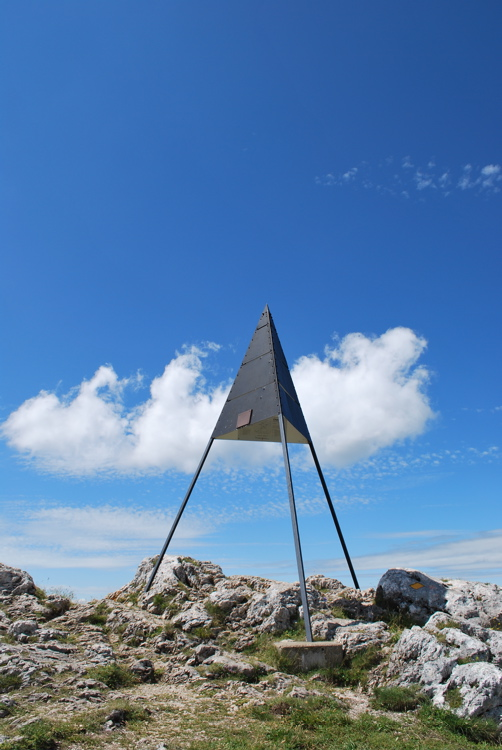

Highest point
- Elevation: 1,607 m (5,272 ft)
- Prominence: 590 m (1,940 ft)
- Parent peak: Crêt de la Neige
- Isolation: 32.0 km (19.9 mi)
- Coordinates: 46°51′6″N 6°32′18.5″E

Geography
- Location within Switzerland
- Location: Vaud, Switzerland
- Parent range: Jura Mountains

Le Chasseron is a mountain in the Jura Mountains, overlooking Sainte-Croix in the canton of Vaud. It has an elevation of 1,607 metres above sea level and is amongst the most isolated mountains of Switzerland.

== See also ==
- List of mountains of Switzerland
