= Pointe d'Aveneyre =

Mountain in Switzerland

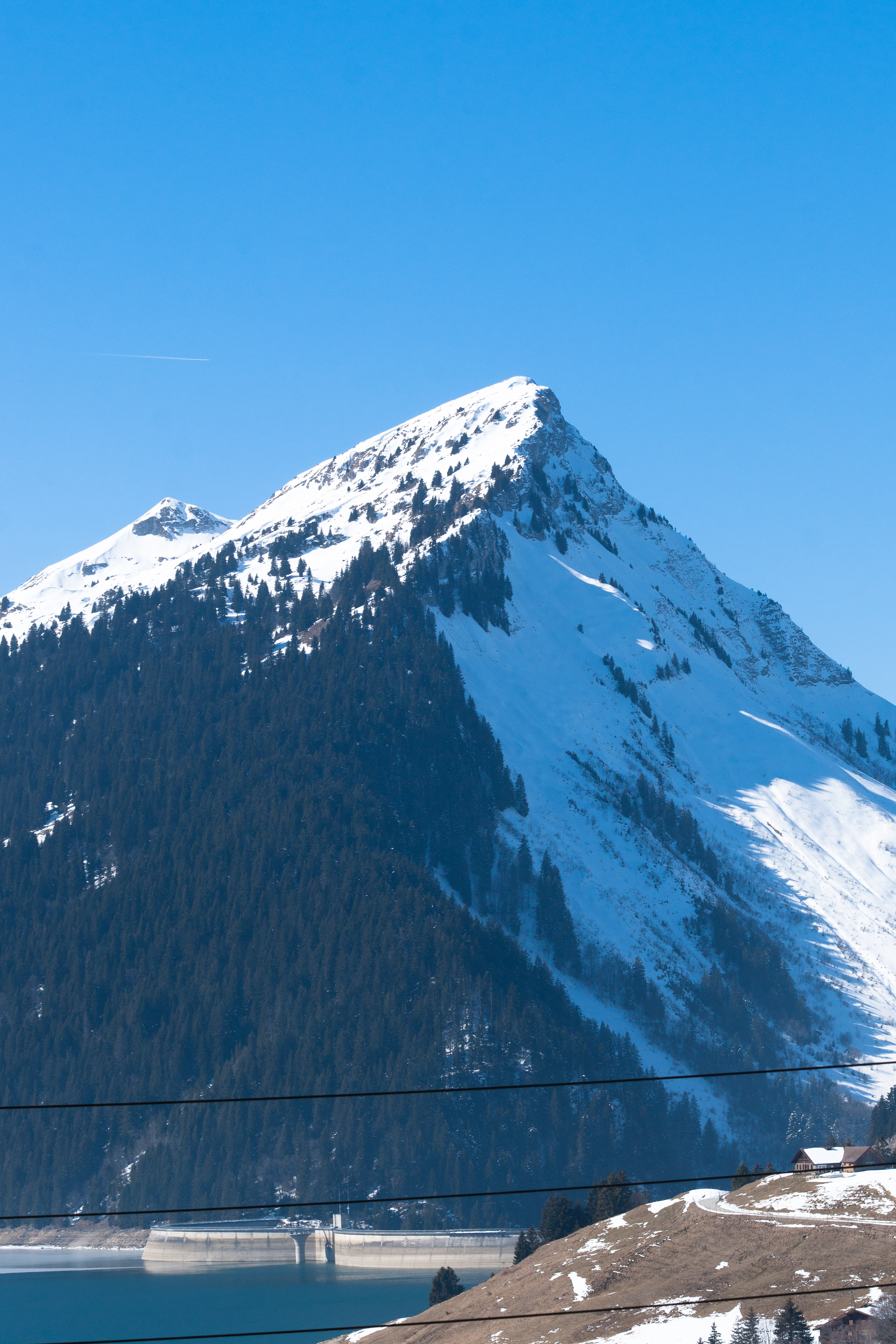
- View from the Lac de l'Hongrin

Highest point
- Elevation: 2,026 m (6,647 ft)
- Prominence: 405 m (1,329 ft)
- Parent peak: Rochers de Naye
- Coordinates: 46°25′2″N 7°0′17″E

Geography
- Location within Switzerland
- Location: Vaud, Switzerland
- Parent range: Swiss Prealps

The Pointe d'Aveneyre (2,026 m) is a mountain of the Swiss Prealps, located east of Villeneuve in the canton of Vaud. It lies south of the Rochers de Naye, on the range overlooking Lake Geneva.
