= Grand Muveran =

Mountain in Switzerland

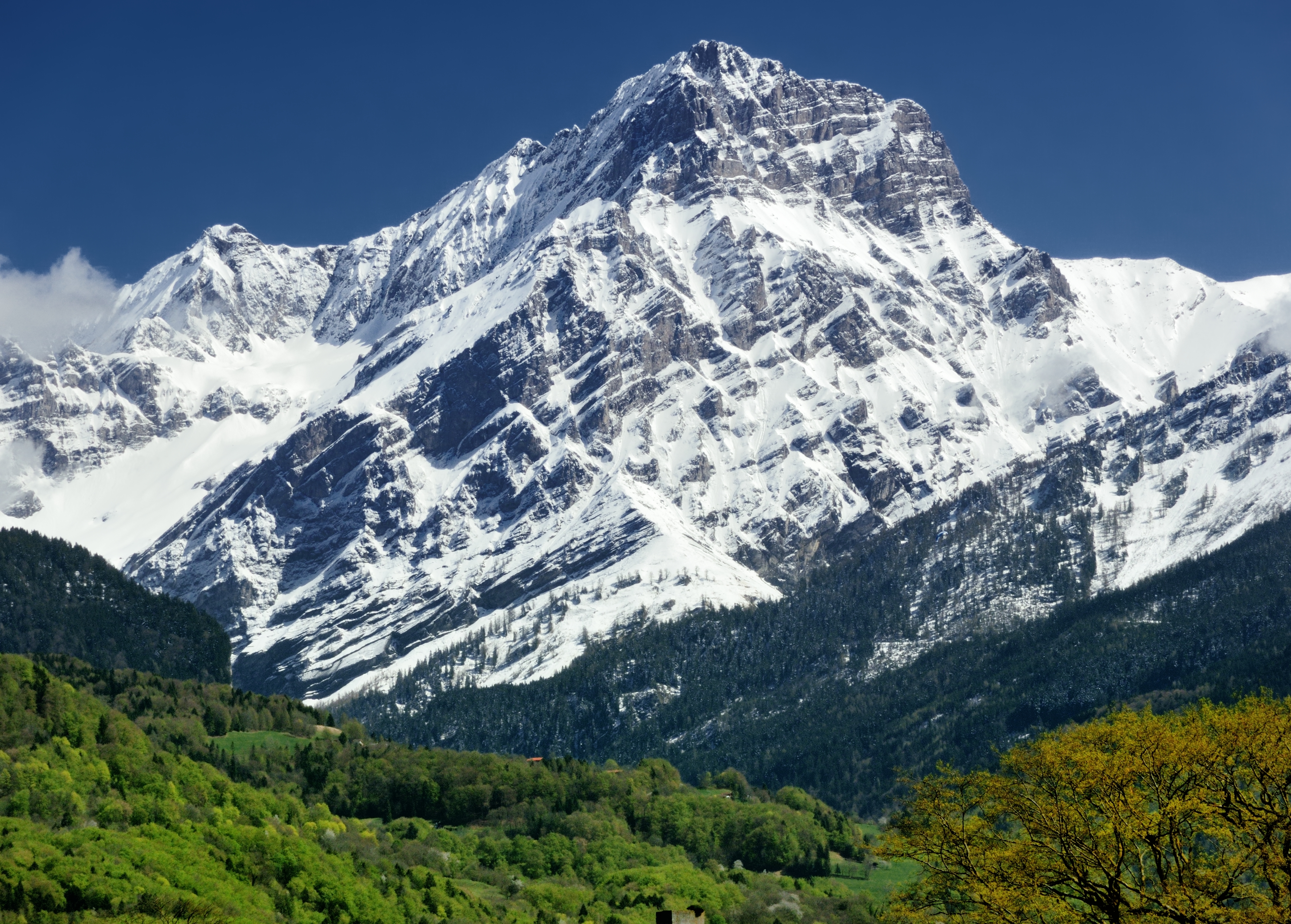
- The Grand Muveran seen from near Aigle (northwest side)

Highest point
- Elevation: 3,051 m (10,010 ft)
- Prominence: 1,013 m (3,323 ft)
- Parent peak: Finsteraarhorn
- Isolation: 8.7 km (5.4 mi)
- Listing: Alpine mountains above 3000 m
- Coordinates: 46°14′14″N 7°07′34″E

Geography
- Location within Switzerland
- Location: Valais/Vaud, Switzerland
- Parent range: Bernese Alps

The Grand Muveran (French pronunciation: [ɡʁɑ̃ myvʁɑ̃]) is a mountain of the Bernese Alps, located on the border between the cantons of Vaud and Valais. At 3,051 metres, it is the highest summit of the group lying between the Rhone knee and the Pas de Cheville and the westernmost three-thousander of the Bernese Alps. The closest localities are Les Plans-sur-Bex (municipality of Bex, Vaud) and Ovronnaz (Valais). It is accompanied by the smaller peak of Petit Muveran.

Overlooking the Rhone valley from a height of about 2,600 metres, the Grand Muveran is the high point of a group (referred to as the Muverans) composed of several summits approaching 3,000 metres, including to the southwest the Dent de Morcles and the Dent Favre, and to the northeast the Tête à Pierre Grept and the Haut de Cry. The Muverans are the second highest massif of the canton of Vaud, after the Diablerets, and one of the four distinct and glaciated massifs of the Bernese Alps that lie between the Rhone elbow and the Gemmi Pass.

The normal route to the summit starts from the Rambert Hut (2,582 m), above Ovronnaz.

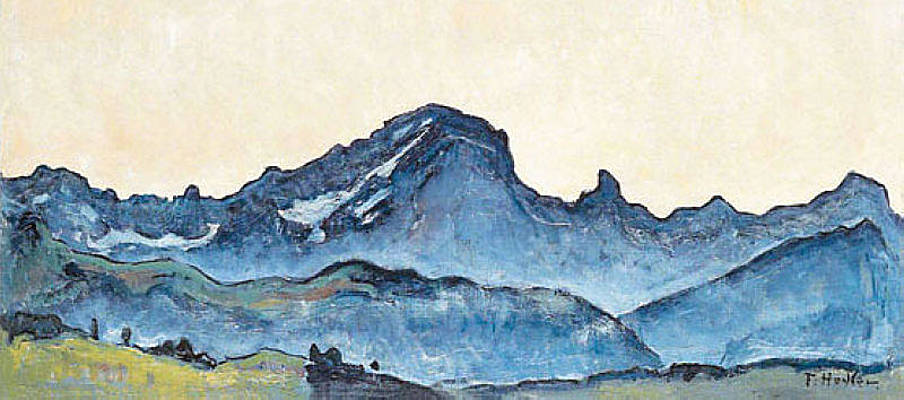
"Grand Muveran" by Ferdinand Hodler (1912)

== See also ==
- Villars-sur-Ollon
