= Dent de Morcles =

Mountain in Switzerland

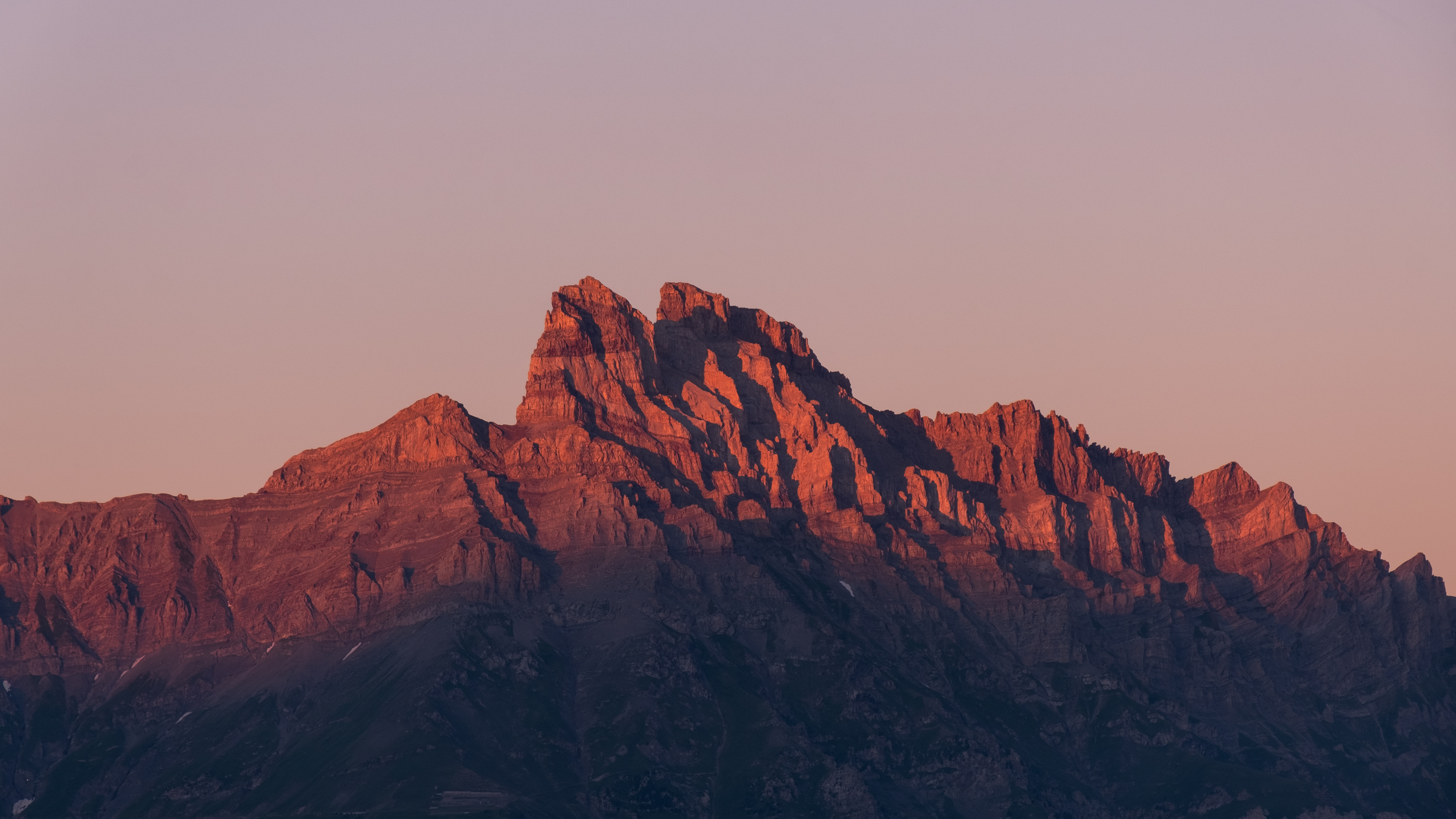
- The Dents de Morcles as seen from the Dent de Valerette.

Highest point
- Elevation: 2,969 m (9,741 ft)
- Prominence: 466 m (1,529 ft)
- Parent peak: Grand Muveran
- Isolation: 5.6 km (3.5 mi)
- Coordinates: 46°11′56″N 7°04′33″E

Geography
- Location within Switzerland
- Location: Vaud/Valais, Switzerland
- Parent range: Bernese Alps

The Dent de Morcles (French pronunciation: [dɑ̃ də mɔʁkl]) is a 2,969 metres high mountain located at western end of the Bernese Alps, overlooking the Rhone between Martigny and St. Maurice. It is the westernmost summit of the Muverans massif, which in turn is the westernmost of the four distinct mountain massifs of the Bernese Alps that lie west of the Gemmi Pass. Its position at the end of this chain of mountains and the abrupt drop to the wide valley of the Rhone river below make the Dent de Morcles prominently visible from many points in Lausanne and other populated areas on the north and northeastern shores of Lake Geneva.

The summit is sometimes distinguished by the name Grande Dent de Morcles, the Petite Dent de Morcles being a lower summit (2,929 m) on the north-west side. Both summits are located on the border between Valais and Vaud.

On the northern slopes lies the small Glacier des Martinets. The Lac de Fully is located on the south side.
