= Höhi Wispile =

Mountain in Switzerland

- Höji Wispile
- Location within Switzerland

Highest point
- Elevation: 1,939 m (6,362 ft)
- Prominence: 280 m (920 ft)
- Parent peak: Wildhorn
- Coordinates: 46°26′08″N 7°17′35″E

Geography
- Location: Bern, Switzerland
- Parent range: Bernese Alps

The Höhi Wispile (also spelled Höji Wispile) is a mountain of the Bernese Alps, overlooking Gstaad in the canton of Bern. It lies on the range separating the main Saane valley from the Lauenen valley, north of the Spitzhorn.

The summit can easily be reached by a cable car from Gstaad.

In the winter, people visit the mountain for its ski slopes and in the summer it is popular for hikes to Lake Lauenen.

== See also ==
- List of mountains of Switzerland accessible by public transport
