= Corn da Tinizong =

Mountain in Switzerland

- Tinzenhorn
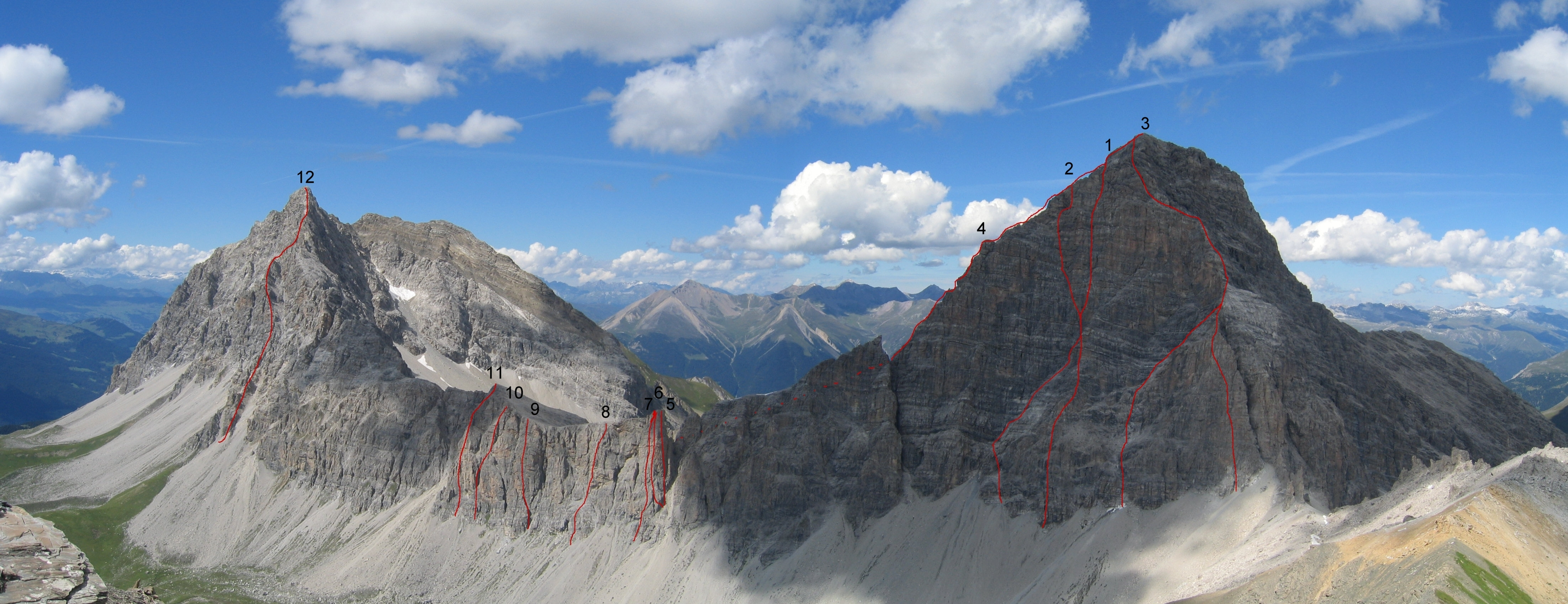
- Piz Mitgel (left) and Corn da Tinizong (right)

Highest point
- Elevation: 3,173 m (10,410 ft)
- Prominence: 473 m (1,552 ft)
- Parent peak: Piz Calderas
- Listing: Alpine mountains above 3000 m
- Coordinates: 46°36′41.3″N 9°40′16.1″E

Geography
- Location within Switzerland
- Location: Graubünden, Switzerland
- Parent range: Albula Range

The Corn da Tinizong (also known as Tinzenhorn) is a mountain of the Albula Alps, located between Savognin and Bergün, in the Swiss canton of Graubünden. Its large southern face overlooks the Pass digls Orgel.

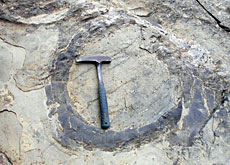
Footprint of dinosaur on Corn da Tinizong
