= List of mountains of Switzerland accessible by public transport =

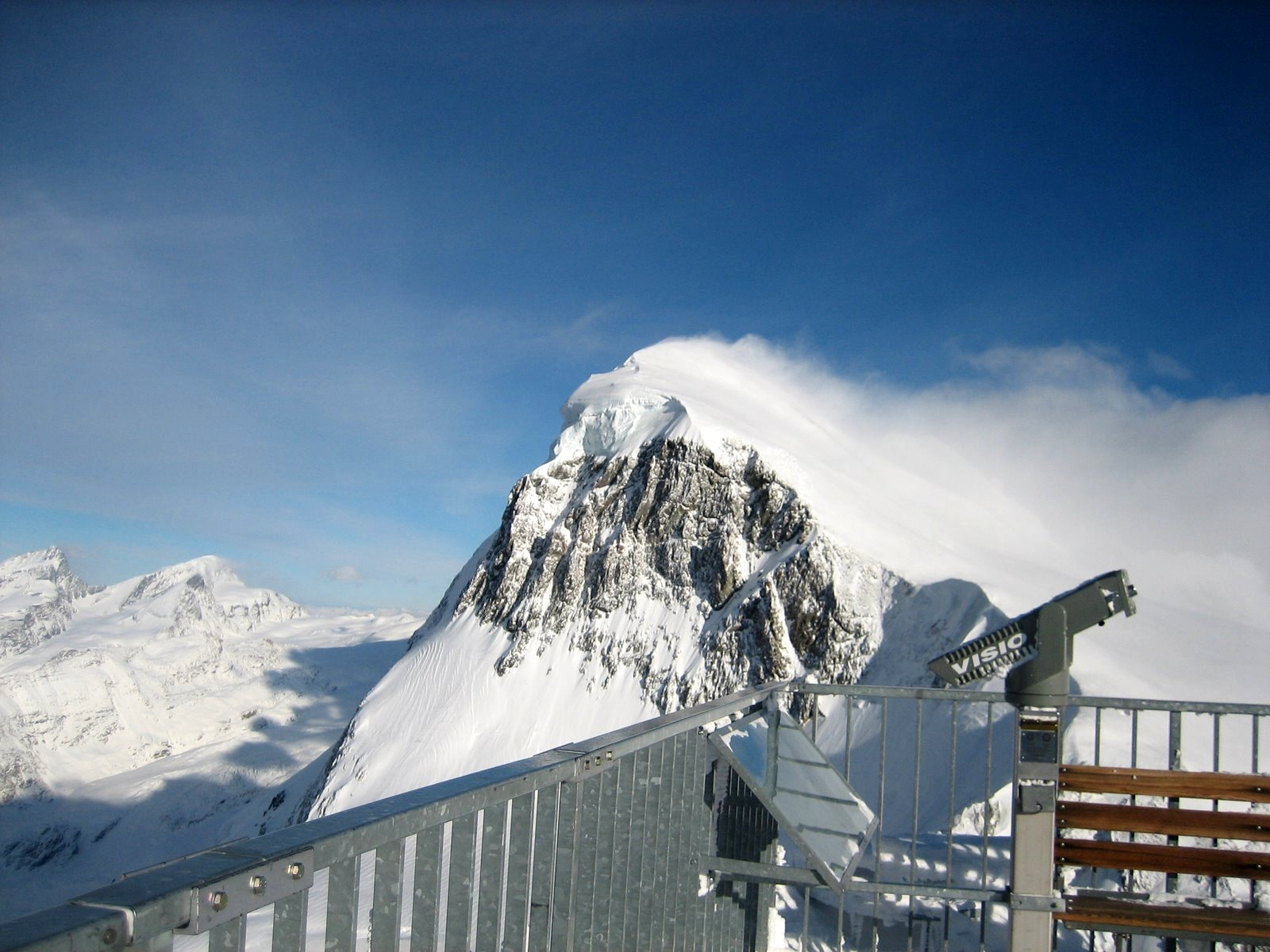
View from the observation deck of the Klein Matterhorn, at 3883 metres above sea level

This is a list of mountains of Switzerland above 800 metres whose summits are accessible by public transport. This list includes mountains with a topographic prominence of at least 30 metres that have a station above the height of their key col and within 120 metres (height difference) from the summit. The station can be reached by cable car, funicular, railway or bus. This list notably includes the Klein Matterhorn and the Säntis, respectively the highest and the most prominent peaks of Europe with public transport access. It also includes the Chasseral, the most isolated summit of the country accessible to pedestrians.

This list does not include ski lifts. For a list of ski areas, see List of ski areas and resorts in Switzerland. For a general list of mountains, see List of mountains of Switzerland.

== List ==
Mountain	Elevation (m)	Prominence (m)	Station elevation (m)	Means of transport	Canton(s)	Coordinates
Klein Matterhorn	3883	88	3860	Cable car (and lift)	Valais	45°56′18″N 07°43′47″E
Sphinx	3572	82	3572	Railway (and lift)	Bern/Valais	46°32′51″N 07°59′08″E
Testa Grigia	3479	34	3479	Cable car	Valais	45°56′07″N 07°42′27″E
Mont Fort	3329	408	3308	Cable car	Valais	46°04′49″N 07°19′08″E
Unnamed summit on Piz Corvatsch	3303	48	3298	Cable car	Graubünden	46°25′03″N 09°49′14″E
Hohtälli	3275	50	3275	Cable car	Valais	45°59′20″N 07°48′08″E
Gornergrat	3135	50	3120	Railway (and lift)	Valais	45°59′00″N 07°47′05″E
Unterrothorn	3104	123	3104	Cable car	Valais	46°01′19″N 07°47′51″E
Klein Titlis	3062	45	3032	Cable car	Bern/Obwalden	46°46′13″N 08°25′31″E
Piz Nair	3056	183	3022	Cable car	Graubünden	46°30′23″N 09°47′15″E
Mont Gelé	3023	219	3002	Cable car	Valais	46°05′49″N 07°16′45″E
Diavolezza	2973	0	2973	Cable car	Graubünden	46°24′44″N 09°57′53″E
Scex Rouge	2971	131	2940	Cable car	Vaud	46°19′38″N 07°12′09″E
Schilthorn	2970	358	2970	Cable car	Bern	46°33′26″N 07°50′07″E
Gemsstock	2961	86	2961	Cable car	Uri	46°36′08″N 08°36′41″E
Piz Lagalb	2959	524	2893	Cable car	Graubünden	46°25′54″N 10°01′25″E
Pointe de la Plaine Morte	2927	87	2882	Cable car	Bern/Valais	46°22′15″N 07°29′13″E
Parpaner Rothorn	2899	77	2861	Cable car	Graubünden	46°44′35″N 09°36′13″E
Laaxer Stöckli	2898	271	2806	Gondola lift	Graubünden	46°52′59″N 09°12′15″E
Corne de Sorebois	2896	82	2870	Chair lift	Valais	46°09′03″N 07°35′12″E
Fiescherhorli	2893	38	2869	Cable car	Valais	46°25′35″N 08°05′34″E
Greitspitz	2867	138	2867	Chair lift	Graubünden	46°58′13″N 10°20′03″E
Weissfluh	2843	497	2820	Cable car	Graubünden	46°50′07″N 09°47′39″E
Fil de Cassons	2695	194	2634	Cable car(no longer accessible)	Graubünden	46°52′43″N 09°16′46″E
Weissfluhjoch	2693	64	2680	Funicular	Graubünden	46°50′00″N 09°48′23″E
Birg	2684	86	2684	Cable car	Bern	46°33′42″N 07°51′21″E
Piz Martegnas	2681	89	2670	Chair lift	Graubünden	46°34′37″N 09°31′40″E
Aroser Weisshorn	2653	286	2653	Cable car	Graubünden	46°47′22″N 09°38′19″E
Jakobshorn	2590	40	2565	Cable car	Graubünden	46°46′21″N 09°50′57″E
Bella Lui	2548	50	2520	Cable car	Valais	46°20′57″N 07°29′18″E
Tête aux Chamois	2525	40	2525	Cable car	Vaud	46°20′23″N 07°12′53″E
Säntis	2502	2021	2502	Cable car	Appenzell A./Appenzell I./St. Gallen	47°14′58″N 09°20′35″E
Unnamed summit on Crap Masegn	2472	60	2472	Cable car	Graubünden	46°50′33″N 09°10′48″E
Lauberhorn	2472	122	2394	Chair lift	Bern	46°35′33″N 07°56′52″E
Savoleyres	2372	57	2354	Gondola lift	Valais	46°07′20″N 07°12′43″E
Niesen	2362	407	2362	Funicular	Bern	46°38′46″N 07°39′09″E
Brienzer Rothorn	2350	1342	2290	Cable car	Bern/Lucerne/Obwalden	46°47′13″N 08°02′49″E
Männlichen	2343	141	2229	Cable car	Bern	46°37′05″N 07°56′17″E
Moosfluh	2334	48	2334	Gondola lift	Valais	46°23′45″N 08°02′54″E
Crêt du Midi	2332	33	2332	Gondola lift	Valais	46°13′47″N 07°31′45″E
Piz Scalottas	2323	132	2323	Chair lift	Graubünden	46°43′19″N 09°30′39″E
Piz Sezner	2310	236	2269	Chair lift	Graubünden	46°42′28″N 09°06′20″E
Calmut	2309	160	2300	Chair lift	Graubünden	46°39′33″N 08°41′03″E
Hinterrugg	2306	470	2262	Cable car	St. Gallen	47°09′13″N 09°18′19″E
Pointe des Mossettes	2277	193	2250	Chair lift	Valais	46°11′26″N 06°48′58″E
Balmeregghorn	2255	45	2230	Chair lift	Bern/Obwalden	46°45′11″N 08°17′00″E
Planplatten	2245	56	2233	Gondola lift	Bern	46°44′13″N 08°15′21″E
Leist	2222	77	2222	Chair lift	St. Gallen	47°03′54″N 09°14′01″E
Regenboldshorn	2193	100	2137	Chair lift	Bern	46°26′32″N 07°30′17″E
Stockhorn	2190	399	2150	Cable car	Bern	46°41′38″N 07°32′15″E
Furggabüel	2174	59	2174	Chair lift	Graubünden	46°48′16″N 09°29′43″E
Stein	2172	90	2150	Chair lift	Graubünden	46°43′33″N 09°07′37″E
Pointe de l'Au	2152	202	2140	Chair lift	Valais	46°12′00″N 06°50′28″E
Pilatus	2128	585	2070	Railway, Cable car	Nidwalden/Obwalden	46°58′26″N 08°14′28″E
Le Chamossaire	2112	377	2100	Chair lift	Vaud	46°19′37″N 07°03′40″E
Rinderberg	2079	371	2004	Gondola lift	Bern	46°30′20″N 07°21′25″E
Ziger	2074	77	2019	Chair lift	St. Gallen	47°04′05″N 09°14′58″E
Geiss	2067	133	1967	Railway	Bern	46°39′11″N 07°54′34″E
Piz Mundaun	2064	83	2053	Chair lift	Graubünden	46°44′34″N 09°09′37″E
Berneuse	2045	140	2045	Gondola lift	Vaud	46°21′35″N 07°00′07″E
Rochers de Naye	2042	590	1968	Railway	Vaud	46°25′55″N 06°58′34″E
Chaux Ronde	2028	223	1987	Chair lift	Vaud	46°19′23″N 07°05′33″E
Moléson	2002	512	1970	Cable car	Fribourg	46°32′56″N 07°01′02″E
Tour de Don	1998	263	1892	Chair lift	Valais	46°17′22″N 06°51′44″E
Sillerenbühl	1973	38	1973	Gondola lift	Bern	46°28′20″N 07°31′07″E
Croix de Culet	1963	155	1940	Cable car	Valais	46°10′32″N 06°50′43″E
Niederhorn	1963	45	1934	Cable car	Bern	46°42′39″N 07°46′24″E
Höhi Wispile	1939	280	1907	Gondola lift	Bern	46°26′08″N 07°17′35″E
Klingenstock	1935	448	1925	Chair lift	Schwyz	46°57′27″N 08°40′28″E
Allmendhubel	1932	33	1910	Funicular	Bern	46°33′51″N 07°53′16″E
Fronalpstock	1921	189	1904	Chair lift	Schwyz	46°58′06″N 08°38′14″E
Stanserhorn	1898	500	1848	Cable car	Nidwalden	46°55′47″N 08°20′25″E
Hugeligrat	1898	129	1831	Gondola lift	Bern	46°31′09″N 07°15′56″E
Rigi	1798	1290	1752	Railway	Schwyz	47°03′24″N 08°29′07″E
Hoher Kasten	1791	251	1791	Cable car	Appenzell I./St. Gallen	47°17′01″N 09°29′07″E
Musenalper Grat	1785	205	1747	Cable car	Nidwalden	46°55′51″N 08°26′30″E
Schwänzelegg	1777	40	1777	Gondola lift	Graubünden	46°56′45″N 09°38′59″E
Spirstock	1771	109	1760	Chair lift	Schwyz	47°00′04″N 08°46′19″E
Klewenstock	1748	216	1720	Chair lift	Nidwalden	46°56′01″N 08°28′41″E
La Berra	1719	308	1635	Gondola lift	Fribourg	46°40′34″N 07°11′02″E
Monte Generoso	1701	1321	1601	Railway	Ticino	45°55′53″N 09°01′12″E
La Dôle	1677	355	1670	Chair lift	Vaud	46°25′31″N 06°05′59″E
Eggli	1672	82	1672	Chair lift	Bern	46°27′22″N 07°15′25″E
Cimetta	1671	61	1647	Chair lift	Ticino	46°12′03″N 08°47′28″E
Kronberg	1663	351	1650	Cable car	Appenzell I.	47°17′29″N 09°19′46″E
Scheidegg (Rigi)	1658	110	1640	Cable car	Schwyz	47°01′39″N 08°31′11″E
Vounetz	1625	44	1612	Gondola lift	Fribourg	46°37′34″N 07°12′28″E
Monte Lema	1621	140	1550	Cable car	Ticino	46°02′26″N 08°49′58″E
Chasseral	1606	666	1548	Bus	Bern	47°09′59″N 07°03′34″E
Rotenfluh	1571	144	1571	Gondola lift	Schwyz	47°01′16″N 08°42′11″E
Marbachegg	1484	181	1484	Gondola lift	Lucerne	46°50′06″N 07°54′19″E
Les Pléiades	1397	242	1361	Railway	Vaud	46°29′23″N 06°54′47″E
Weissenstein	1395	213	1280	Gondola lift	Solothurn	47°15′07″N 07°30′33″E
Mont Soleil	1291	221	1180	Funicular	Bern	47°09′55″N 06°59′20″E
Bürgenstock	1128	683	1115	Lift	Lucerne/Nidwalden	47°00′01″N 08°23′54″E
Zugerberg	1024	561	927	Funicular	Zug	47°08′21″N 08°32′18″E
Montagne du Château	929	249	858	Bus	Vaud	46°34′51″N 06°42′57″E
Monte Brè	925	135	910	Funicular	Ticino	46°00′33″N 08°59′13″E
Monte San Salvatore	912	602	882	Funicular	Ticino	45°58′38″N 08°56′51″E
Üetliberg	870	143	813	Railway	Zurich	47°20′58″N 08°29′31″E
Gurten	858	215	840	Funicular	Bern	46°55′02″N 07°26′37″E
Hill of Gruyères	828	82	800	Bus	Fribourg	46°35′06″N 07°05′00″E
Chutzen	820	261	762	Bus	Bern	47°00′53″N 07°19′26″E
Sonnenberg	800	240	705	Funicular	Lucerne	47°02′24″N 08°15′02″E

== See also ==
- List of aerial tramways in Switzerland
- List of funiculars in Switzerland
- List of mountain railways in Switzerland
- List of highest paved roads in Switzerland
- List of buildings and structures in Switzerland above 3000 m
- Lists of tourist attractions in Switzerland
