= Croix de Culet =

Mountain in Switzerland

- Location within Switzerland

Highest point
- Elevation: 1,963 m (6,440 ft)
- Prominence: 155 m (509 ft)
- Parent peak: Hauts-Forts
- Coordinates: 46°10′32″N 6°50′43.5″E

Geography
- Location: Valais, Switzerland
- Parent range: Chablais Alps

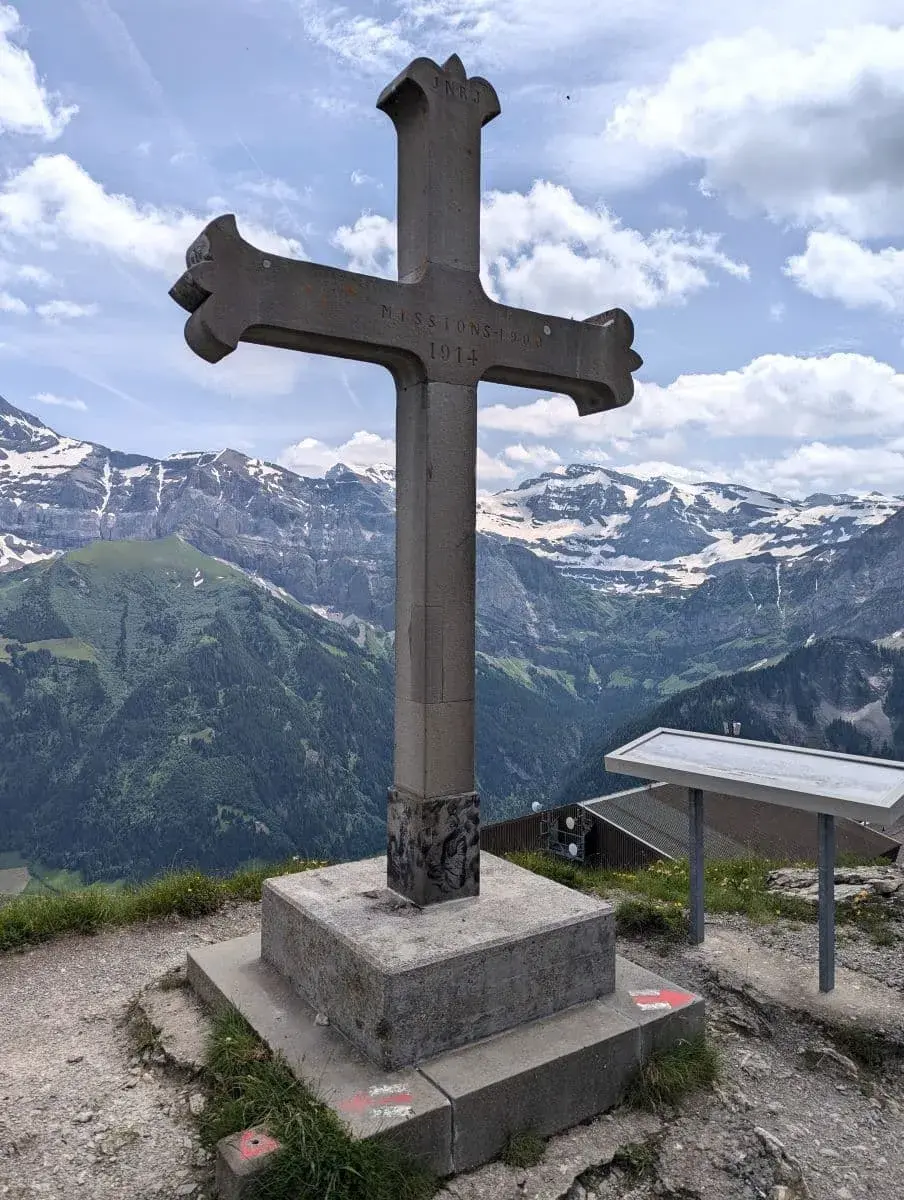
Summit Cross on the top of Croix de Culet Mountain

The Croix de Culet is a mountain of the Chablais Alps, overlooking Champéry in the canton of Valais. It lies between the valleys of Les Crosets and Planachaux.

The summit can by reached by cable car from Champéry. In winter the mountain is part of the ski area Portes du Soleil.

== See also ==
- List of mountains of Switzerland accessible by public transport
