= Piz Scalottas =

Mountain in Switzerland

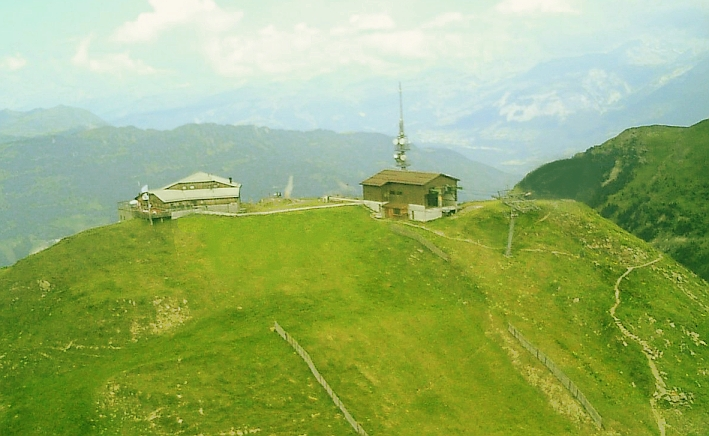

Highest point
- Elevation: 2,323 m (7,621 ft)
- Prominence: 132 m (433 ft)
- Parent peak: Stätzerhorn
- Coordinates: 46°43′18.7″N 9°30′38.9″E

Geography
- Location within Switzerland
- Location: Graubünden, Switzerland
- Parent range: Plessur Alps

Climbing
- Easiest route: Aerial tramway

Piz Scalottas is a mountain of the Plessur Alps, located near Lenzerheide in the canton of Graubünden, Switzerland.

In winter a chairlift brings skiers to the summit of Piz Scalottas. The mountain offers a view to overlook both sides, Lenzerheide to the east and the Domleschg valley to the west. For those who wish to discover the area during summer by mountain bike, the chairlift to Piz Scalottas will transport your mountain bike for free to the summit.

== See also ==
- List of mountains of Switzerland accessible by public transport
