= Crêt du Midi =

Mountain in Switzerland

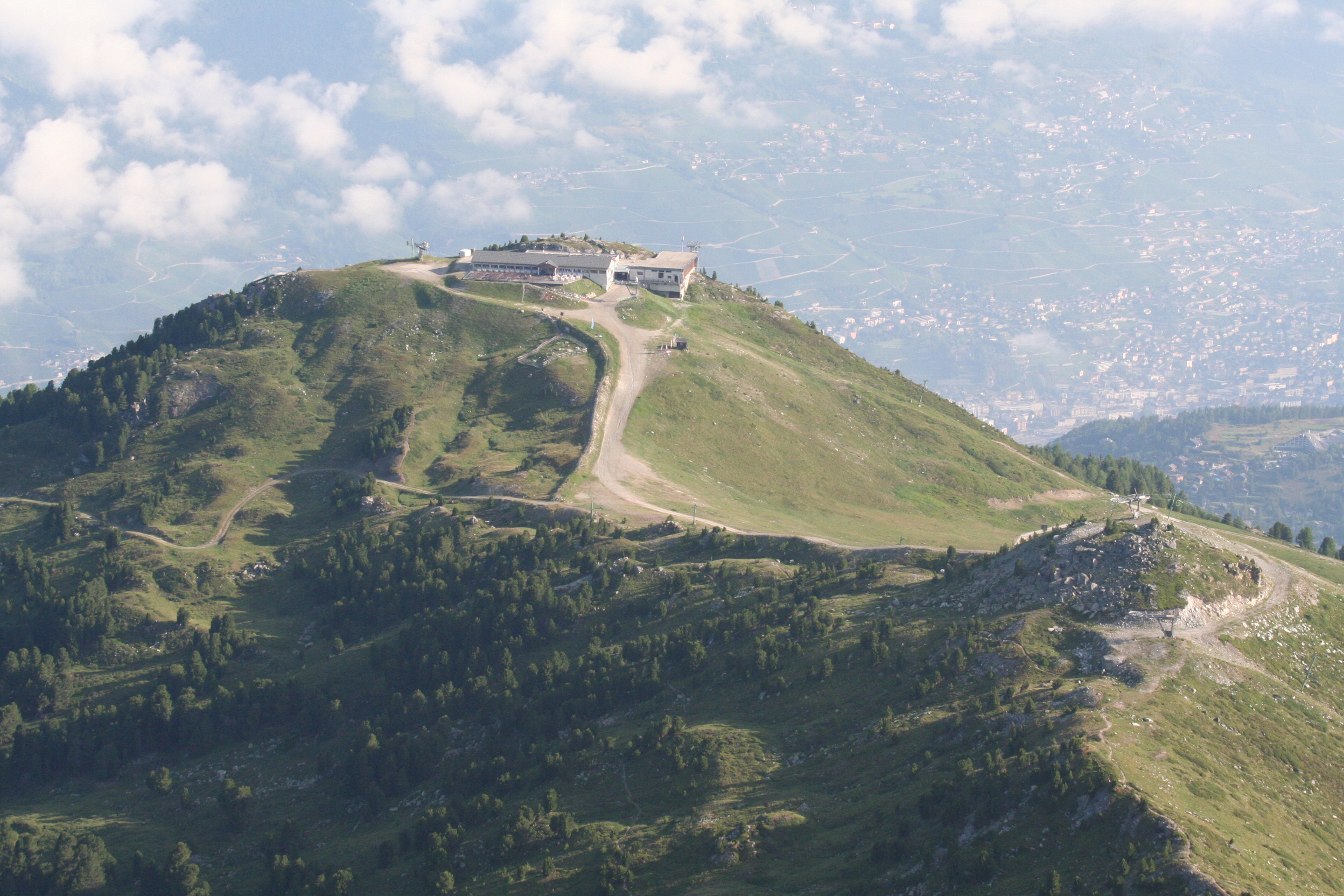

Highest point
- Elevation: 2,332 m (7,651 ft)
- Prominence: 33 m (108 ft)
- Coordinates: 46°13′46.5″N 7°31′45″E

Geography
- Location within Switzerland
- Location: Valais, Switzerland
- Parent range: Pennine Alps

The Crêt du Midi is a mountain of the Pennine Alps, overlooking Vercorin in the canton of Valais. The summit is accessible by cable car from Chalais or Vercorin (near Sierre).

== See also ==
- List of mountains of Switzerland accessible by public transport
