= Stein (Obersaxen) =

Mountain in Switzerland

- Location within Switzerland

Highest point
- Elevation: 2,172 m (7,126 ft)
- Prominence: 90 m (300 ft)
- Parent peak: Piz Sezner
- Coordinates: 46°43′33.6″N 9°07′37.3″E

Geography
- Location: Graubünden, Switzerland
- Parent range: Lepontine Alps

The Stein (German pronunciation: [ʃtaɪn]; 2,172 m) is a mountain of the Swiss Lepontine Alps, overlooking Obersaxen in the canton of Graubünden. It lies between the main Rhine valley, the Surselva, and the Lumnezia. A cable car station (2,144 m) is located near the summit.
