= Allmendhubel =

Mountain in Switzerland

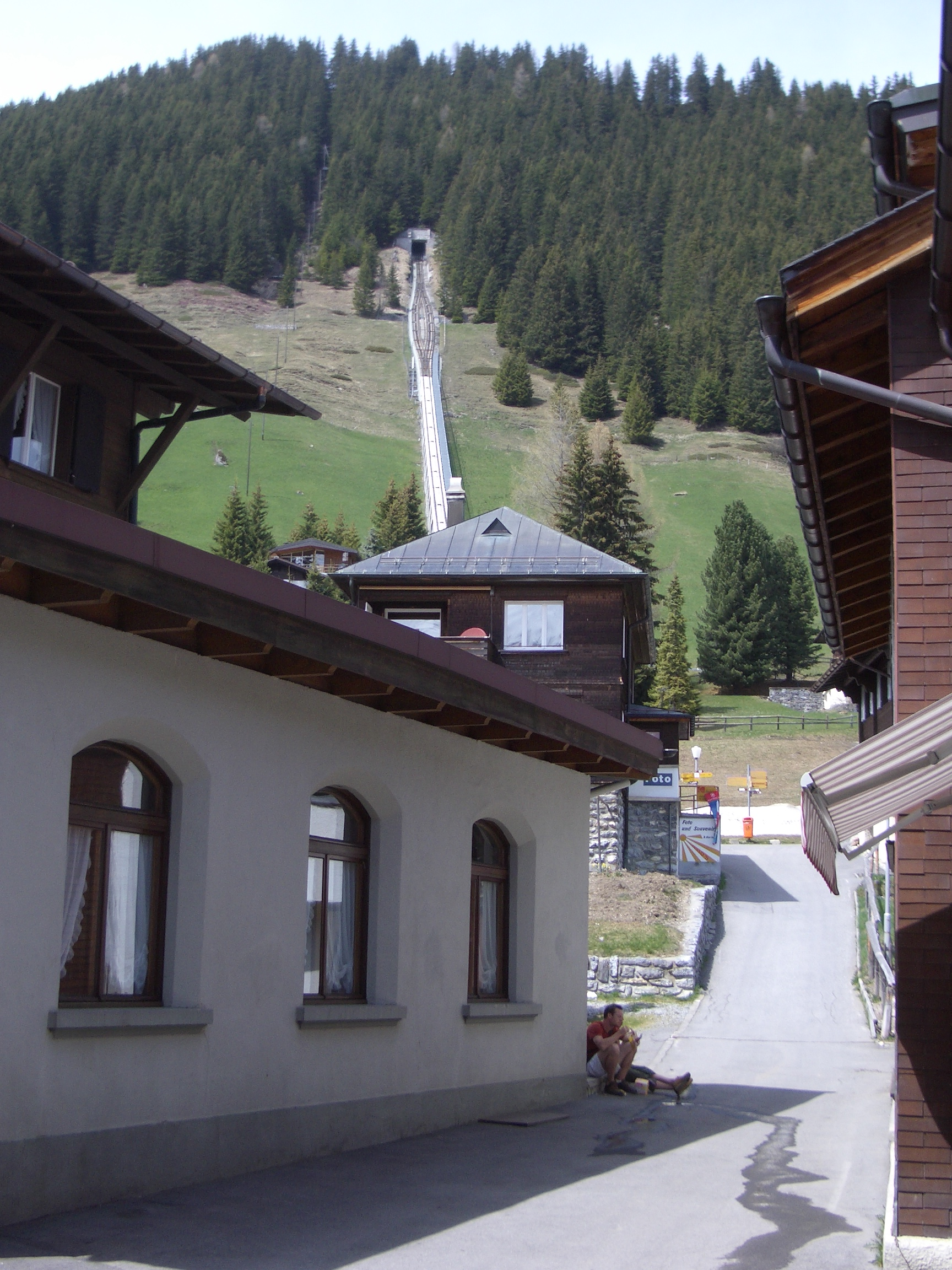
- View from Mürren

Highest point
- Elevation: 1,932 m (6,339 ft)
- Prominence: 33 m (108 ft)
- Coordinates: 46°33′51″N 07°53′16″E

Geography
- Location within Switzerland
- Location: Bern, Switzerland
- Parent range: Bernese Alps

The Allmendhubel (1,932 m) is a hill above Mürren, overlooking the valley of Lauterbrunnen in the canton of Bern. Its summit is easily accessible from Mürren by a funicular, the Allmendhubelbahn, which reaches a height of 1,907 metres. A restaurant is also located near the top.

In winter, the Allmendhubel is part of a ski area and includes several ski lifts.

== See also ==
- List of mountains of Switzerland accessible by public transport
