= Piz Martegnas =

Mountain in Switzerland

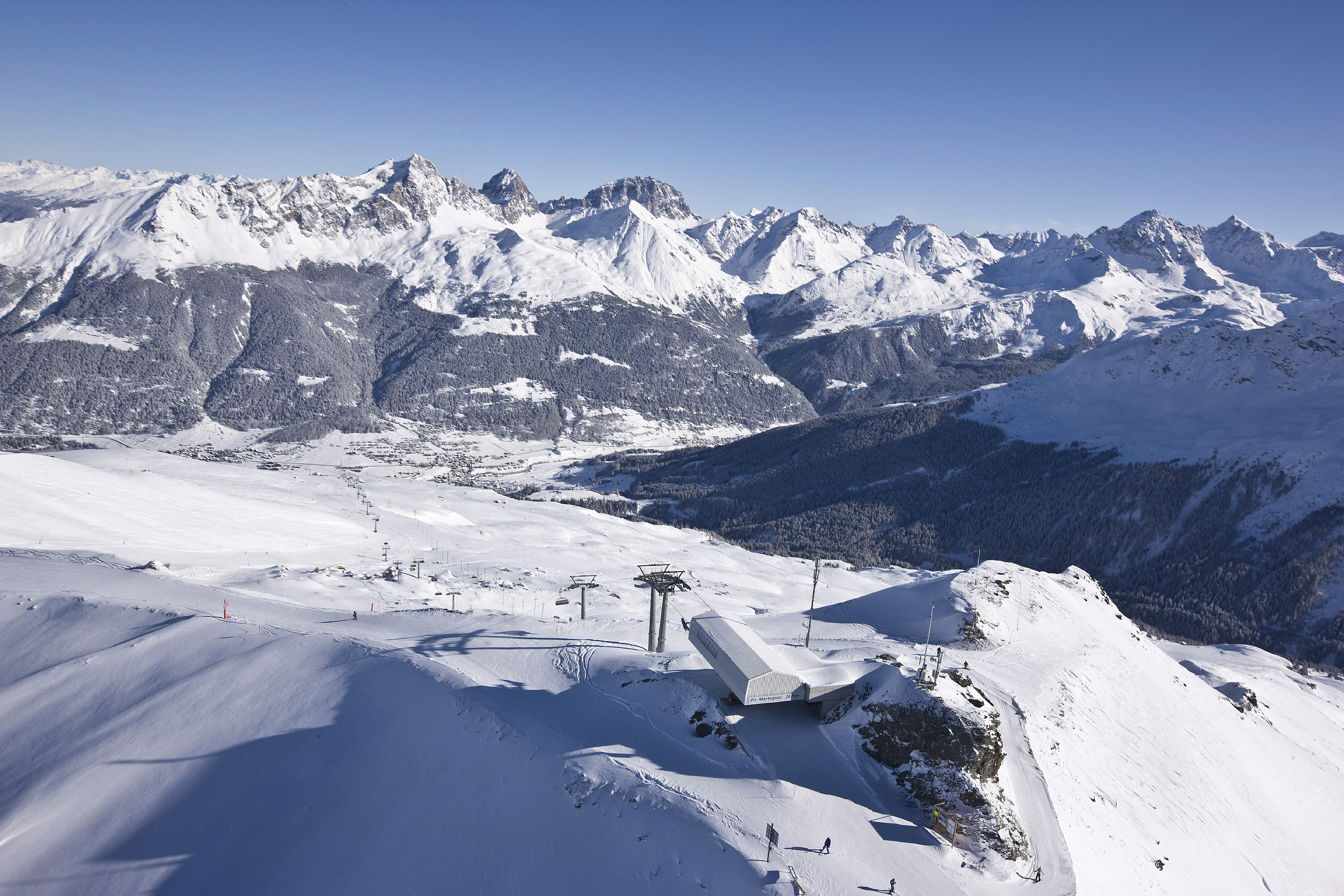
- View from the summit (towards east)

Highest point
- Elevation: 2,681 m (8,796 ft)
- Prominence: 89 m (292 ft)
- Parent peak: Piz Curvér
- Coordinates: 46°34′36.9″N 09°31′40.5″E

Geography
- Location within Switzerland
- Location: Graubünden, Switzerland
- Parent range: Oberhalbstein Alps

Climbing
- Easiest route: Aerial tramway

Piz Martegnas is a mountain of the Oberhalbstein Alps, overlooking Savognin in Graubünden, Switzerland. Piz Martegnas is part of a ski area, a chair lift station lies 11 metres below the summit.

== See also ==
- List of mountains of Switzerland accessible by public transport
