= La Berra =

Mountain in Switzerland

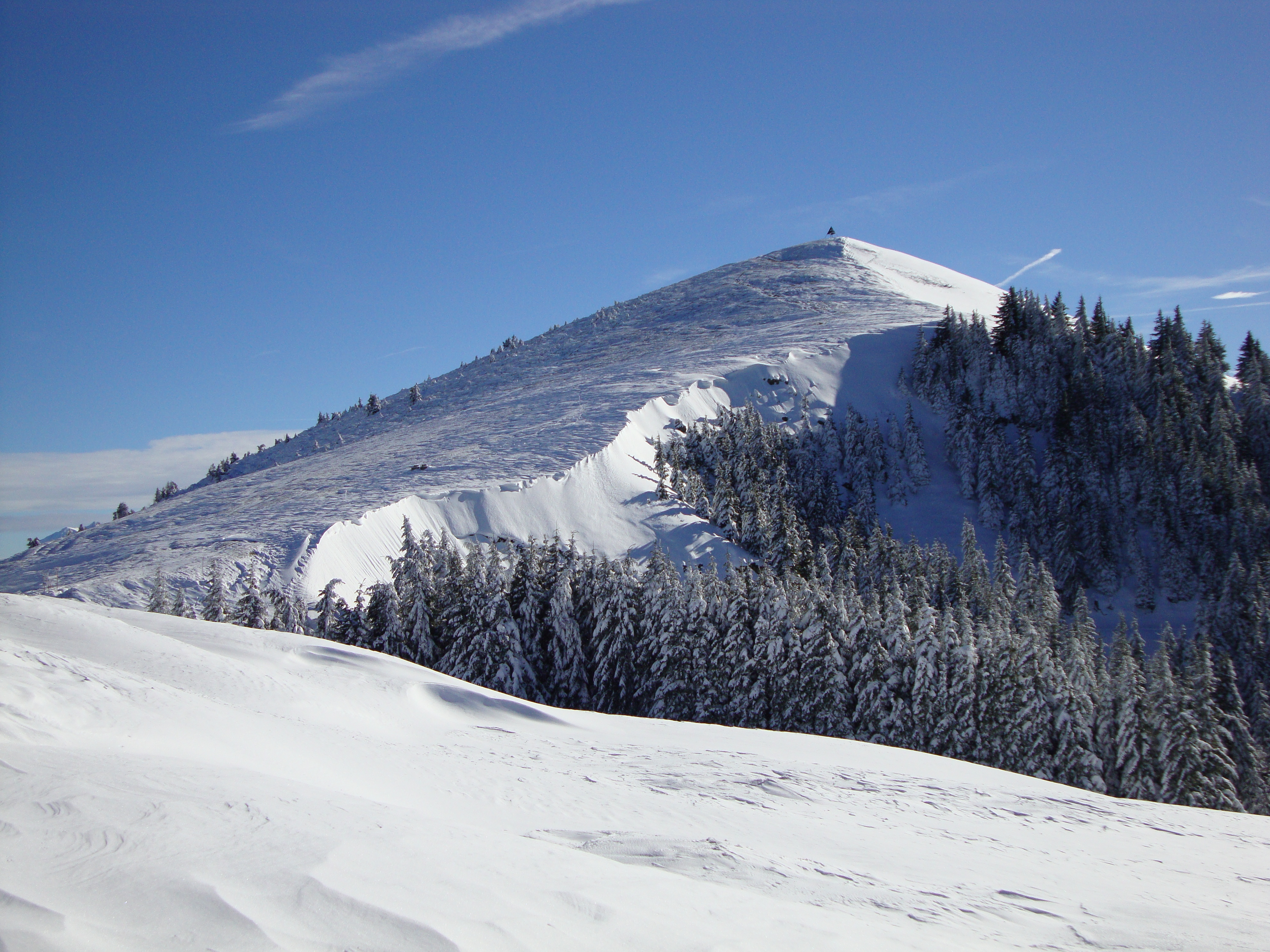
- View from the west side

Highest point
- Elevation: 1,719 m (5,640 ft)
- Prominence: 307 m (1,007 ft)
- Parent peak: Dent de Savigny
- Coordinates: 46°40′33.5″N 7°11′2.5″E

Geography
- Location within Switzerland
- Location: Fribourg, Switzerland
- Parent range: Swiss Prealps

La Berra (1,719 m) is a mountain of the Swiss Prealps, overlooking the Lake of Gruyère in the canton of Fribourg.

== See also ==
- List of mountains of Switzerland accessible by public transport
