= Allmendhubelbahn =

Funicular in Bernese Oberland in Switzerland

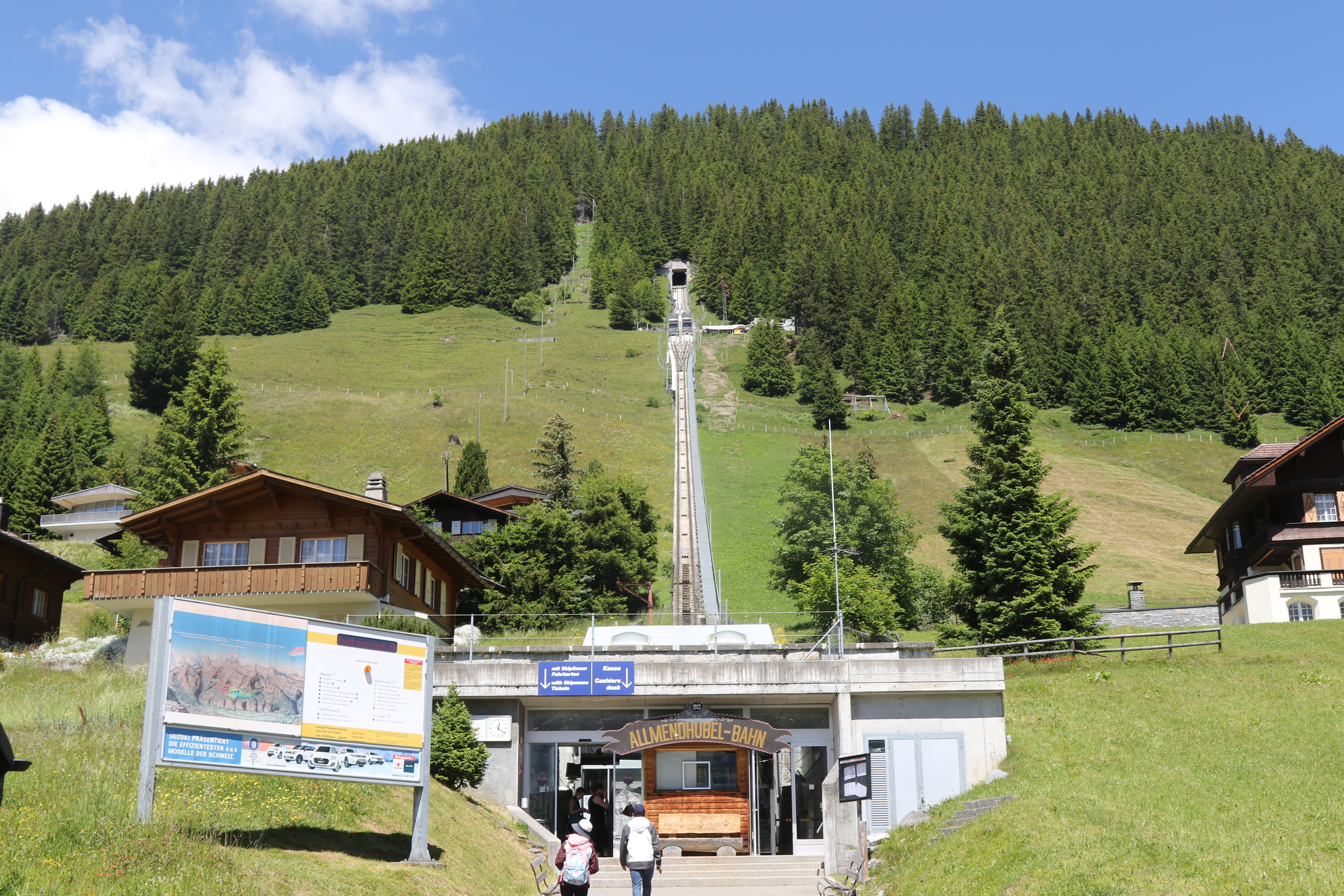
- lower station and cars at passing loop (2018)

Overview
- Other name(s): Seilbahn Mürren-Allmendhubel
- Status: In operation
- Owner: Schilthornbahn AG (2001-); Sportbahnen Mürren AG (1998–2001); Seilbahn Mürren-Allmendhubel AG (1912–1998)
- Locale: Mürren, Switzerland
- Termini: "Mürren (Allmendhubelbahn)"; "Allmendhubel (Standseilbahn)"
- Stations: 2
- Website: schilthorn.ch

Service
- Type: Funicular
- Operator(s): Schilthornbahn AG
- Rolling stock: 2

History
- Opened: 16 December 1912 (112 years ago)
- Enhancements: 1999

Technical
- Line length: 536 metres (1,759 ft)
- Number of tracks: 1 with passing loop
- Track gauge: 1,000 mm (3 ft 3 3/8 in) metre gauge
- Electrification: from opening
- Highest elevation: 1,907 m (6,257 ft)
- Maximum incline: 61%

Seilbahn Mürren-Allmendhubel (SMA), also Allmendhubelbahn, is a funicular in Bernese Oberland in Switzerland.

== History ==
The Allmendhubelbahn was brought into service in 1912, initially operating only in winter. When opened, Allmenhubebahn connected a bobsleigh run, which closed in the 1930s. However, the 1969 film On Her Majesty's Secret Service rebuilt the run for filming an action sequence between James Bond and enemy Ernst Stavro Blofeld. A toboggan sled run remains at Allmendhubel to this day.

In 1996, Jungfraubahn Railways wanted to decommission the funicular railway and replace it with a chairlift. However, this did not pass and Schilthornbahn AG, under leadership of Max Kopp, took ownership of the route, refurbishing the tracks, carriages and restaurant by 2000. In 2012, Allmendhubelbahn celebrated its 100th anniversary, recognising Britain's input to the region with a tribute to Arnold Lunn who encouraged the building of the route, and a Eddie The Eagle as guest of honour.

== Route ==
The Allmenndhubelbahn begins in Mürren (at 46.5607°N 7.8928°E 1,650 m or 5,413 ft above sea level) with a maximum upward gradient of 61% up to the Allmendhubel (at 46.564°N 7.889°E 1,907 m or 6,257 ft). The 1,000 mm (3 ft 3 3/8 in) gauge line is 551 m (1,808 ft) long.

== See also ==
- List of funicular railways
- List of funiculars in Switzerland
