= Piz Mitgel =

Mountain in Switzerland

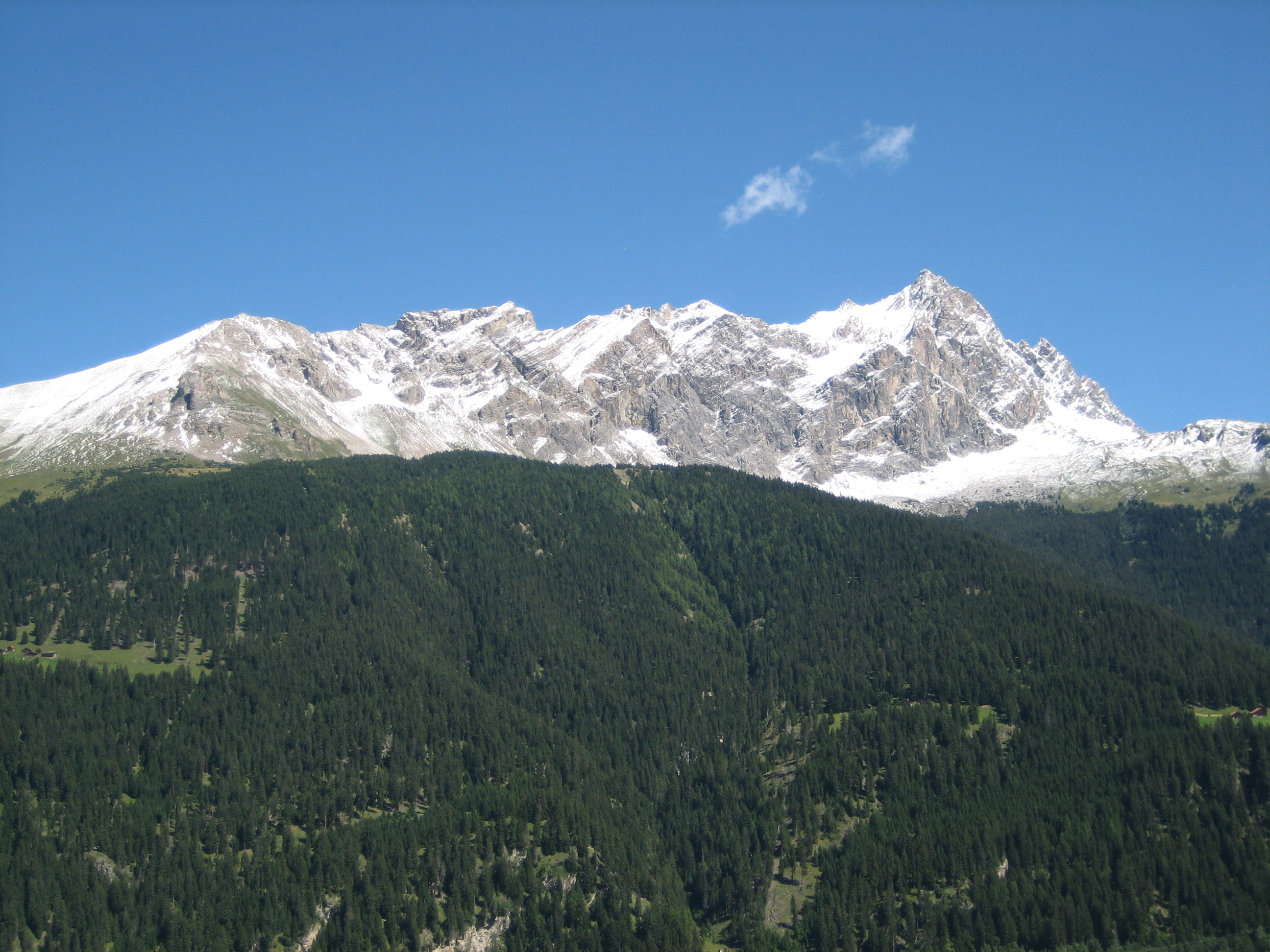
- View from Riom-Parsonz (western side)

Highest point
- Elevation: 3,159 m (10,364 ft)
- Prominence: 447 m (1,467 ft)
- Parent peak: Corn da Tinizong
- Listing: Alpine mountains above 3000 m
- Coordinates: 46°36′51.3″N 9°38′47.7″E

Geography
- Location within Switzerland
- Location: Graubünden, Switzerland
- Parent range: Albula Range

Piz Mitgel is a mountain in the Albula Range of the Swiss Alps, overlooking Savognin, in the canton of Graubünden. Similarly to its higher neighbor, Corn da Tinizong, it has an almost vertical south face. A via ferrata (Senda Ferrada) leads to the summit.

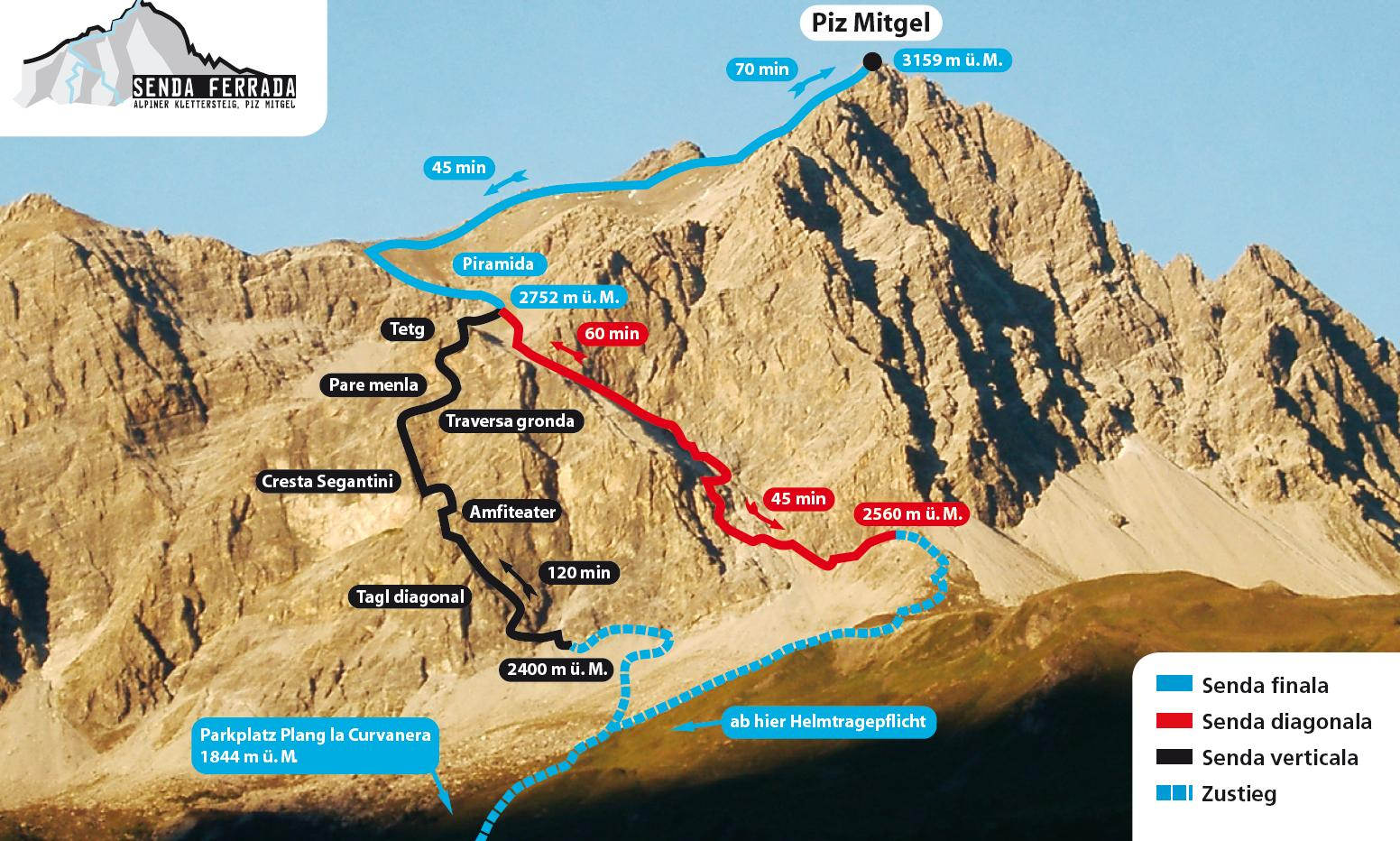
Routes to the summit
