= Bella Lui =

Mountain in Switzerland

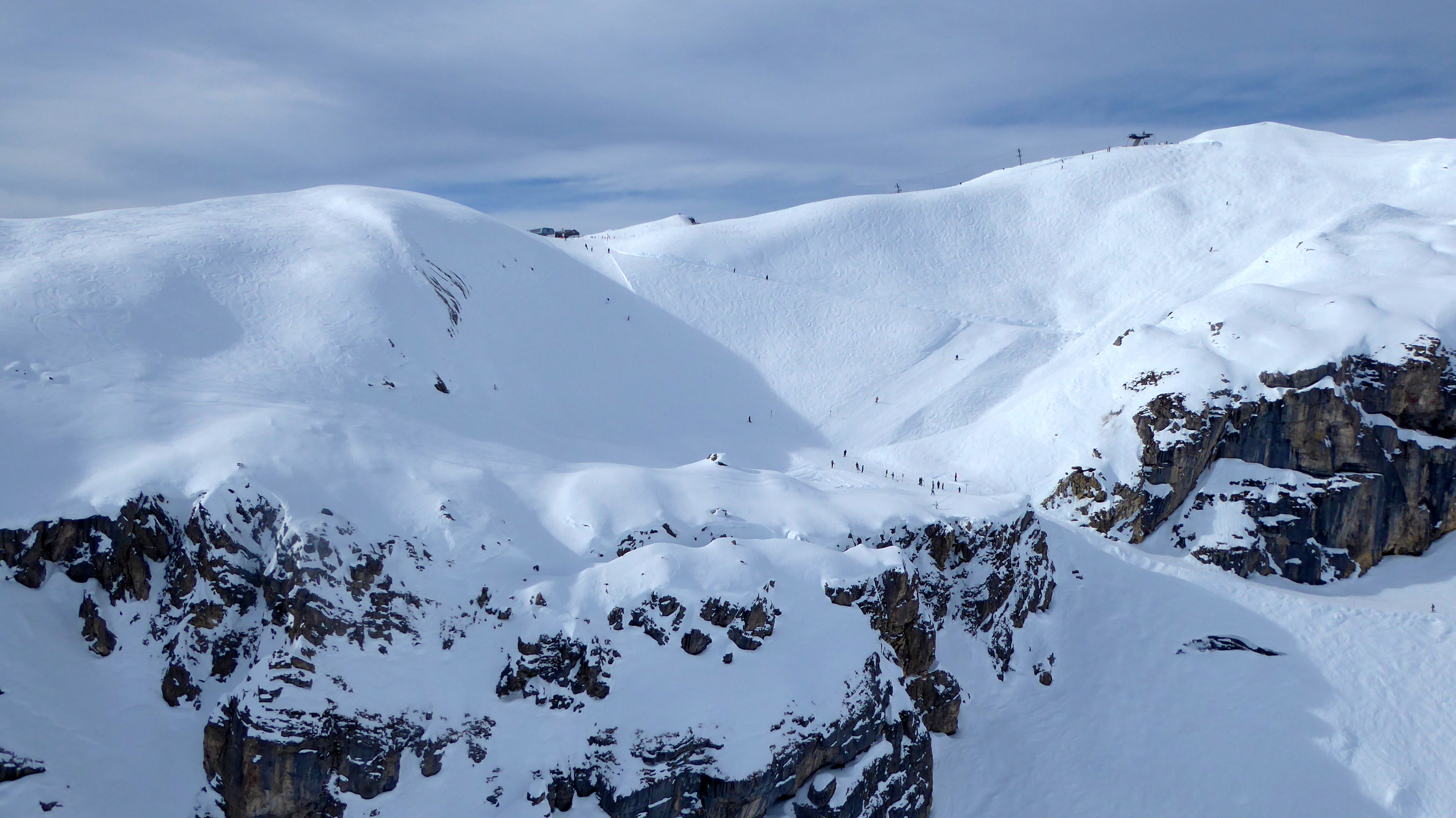
- BELLA LUI ski run in Swiss Alps near Crans Montana

Highest point
- Elevation: 2,548 m (8,360 ft)
- Prominence: 50 m (160 ft)
- Parent peak: Wildstrubel
- Coordinates: 46°20′46″N 7°29′05″E

Geography
- Location within Switzerland
- Location: Valais, Switzerland
- Parent range: Bernese Alps

The Bella Lui is a mountain of the Bernese Alps, located north of Crans-Montana in the Swiss canton of Valais. A cable car station is located near the summit and, in winter, the mountain is part of ski area.

== See also ==
- List of mountains of Switzerland accessible by public transport
