= Musenalper Grat =

Mountain in Switzerland

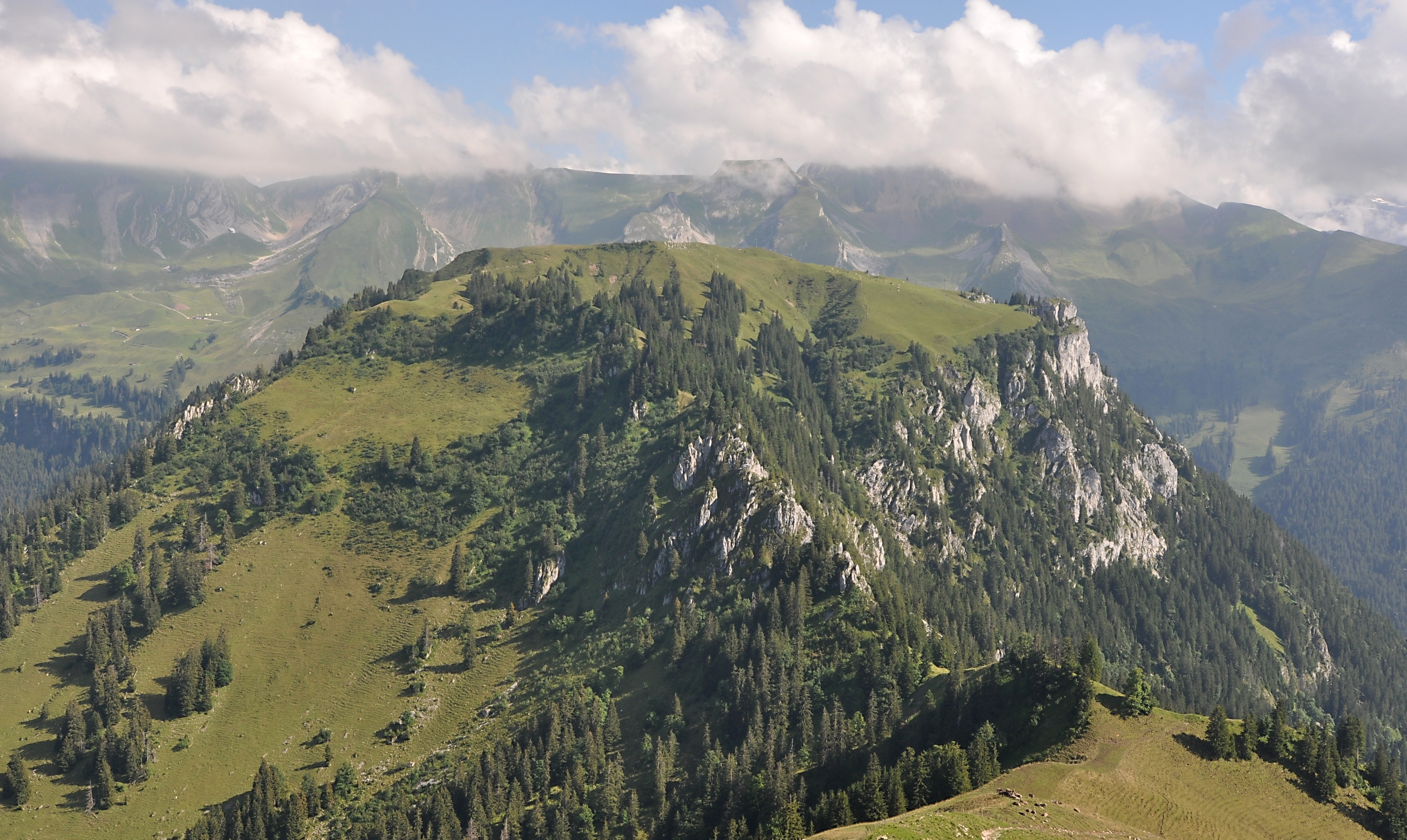
- Musenalper Grat from the Buochserhorn

Highest point
- Elevation: 1,785 m (5,856 ft)
- Prominence: 205 m (673 ft)
- Coordinates: 46°55′51″N 08°26′30″E

Geography
- Location within Switzerland
- Location: Nidwalden, Switzerland
- Parent range: Uri Alps

The Musenalper Grat (1,785 m) is a mountain of the Uri Alps, overlooking Niederrickenbach in the Swiss canton of Nidwalden. It lies on the range south of Lake Lucerne.

A cable car links Niederrickenbach to the Ober Musenalp (1,747 m), near the summit of the mountain.

== See also ==
- List of mountains of Switzerland accessible by public transport
