= Madonna del Sasso, Switzerland =

Shrine in Orselina, Switzerland

Coordinates: 46°10′31″N 8°47′35″E

The venerated image of the Madonna and Child, crafted by the Roman artisan Domenico Merzagora and later granted a Pontifical decree of coronation by the Rosary Pope on 14 August 1880

The Basilica of Madonna del Sasso ("Basilica of Our Lady of the Rock") is a Roman Catholic minor basilica and Pontifical shrine in Orselina, above the city of Locarno in Switzerland. It is a shrine composed of two Marian churches, one on the lower land, another on the upper shrine.

== History ==
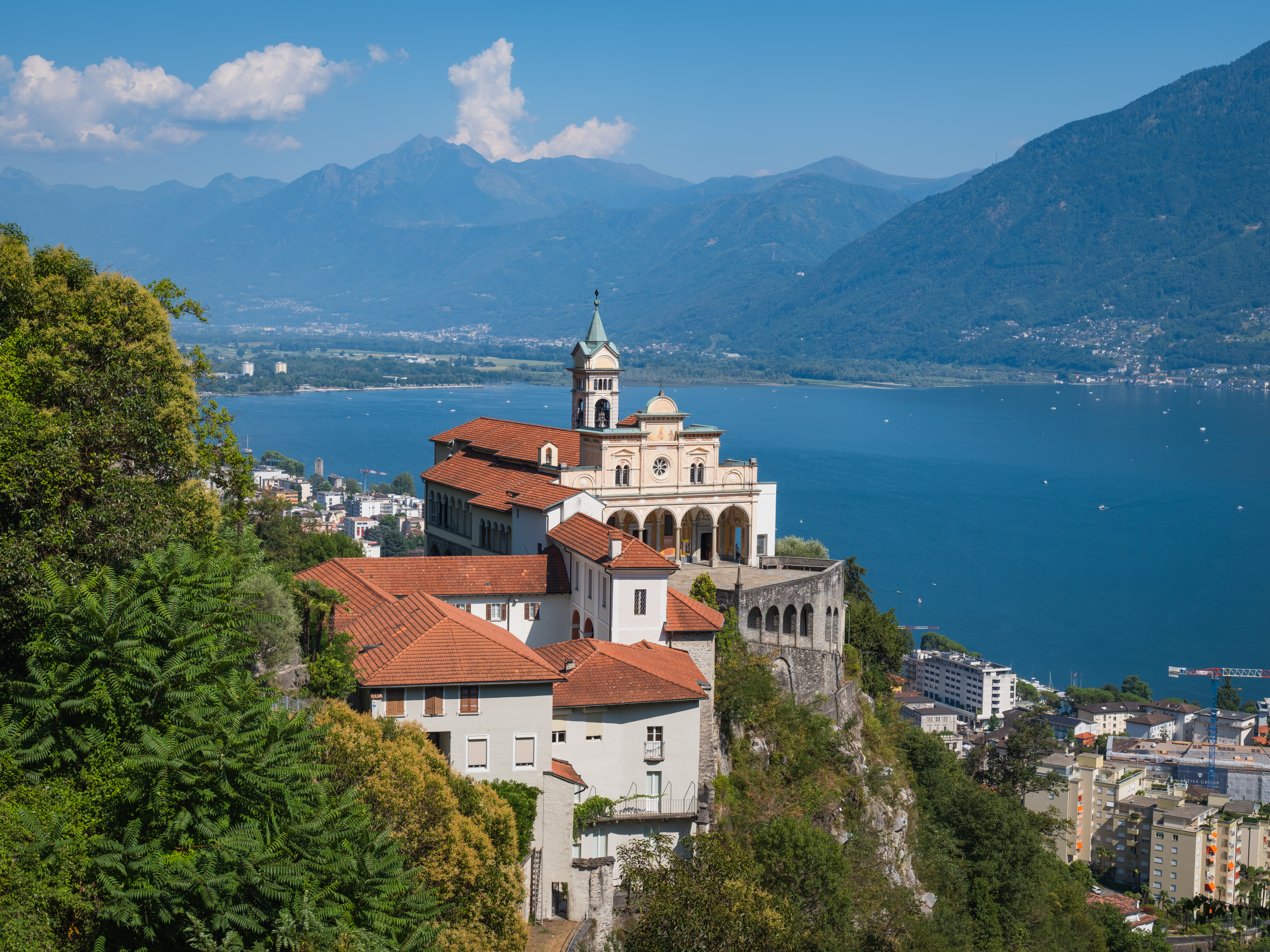
Skyline view of the shrine

The founding of the sanctuary goes back to the Franciscan friar Bartolomeo Piatti de Ivrea who reputedly sighted a Marian apparition on 15 August 1480. The Roman artisan, Domenico Merzagora crafted the wooden Marian image enshrined within in 1485.

The lower land of the first church consisted of a field and a garden was originally donated by Lord Antonio Guido Orelli via the signed deed titled Instrumentum Donationis on 22 May 1499. The deed was received and notarized by Iohannes Georgius de Baddis. A small chapel was erected and later dedicated to Our Lady of the Annunciation and consecrated in 1502. In later years, the Massina del Monte family who owned the upper cliff donated the land to the Order of Friars Minor and dedicated the upper shrine to Our Lady of the Assumption.

Panoramic view of the loggia with a Franciscan priest (Detroit Publishing Company, circa 1905)

During the tumultuous years of 19th century, the Republic and Canton of Ticino issued a decree on 25 July 1848 which expropriated the convent and the Sanctuary of the Madonna del Sasso, expelling the Conventual friars from the Canton. Accordingly, Alessandro da Giornico, a Capuchin priest, was then called to guard the sanctuary, and from that moment on the property remained in the Canton, while the Capuchins took custody of it and looked after the religious site to prevent any further disrepair and vandalism.

The interior is highly ornate and decorated, and a platform has panoramic views of the city and Lake Maggiore. The sanctuary is linked to the Locarno city center by the Locarno–Madonna del Sasso funicular.

== Pontifical approbations ==
Facade of the church bearing the sight of the Marian apparition

Pope Alexander VI confirmed the donation of the cliff on deed titled Sancta Maria Virgo de Saxo notarized by Cardinal Antonio Trivulzio the Elder on 16 February 1498.

Souvenir card from Madonna del Sasso (early 20th century)

Pope Leo X issued another decree on 10 January 1514 endowing the shrine with Pontifical rights, exempting it from any servitude or episcopal jurisdiction. The upper church was built and was consecrated to Our Lady of the Assumption by the former Bishop of Como, Filippo Archinto on 1 May 1616. A diocesan coronation of the Marian image took place in 1617. The Order of Friars Minor ultimately funded a commemorative marble plaque citing the purported miraculous apparition and history of the shrine on 10 July 1624, still displayed onsite.

Pope Leo XIII issued a decree of coronation on 14 August 1880, which crowned the Marian image via the former Archbishop of Milan, Paolo Angelo Ballerini, following festivities of 15 and 16 August, marking the 400 years of the apparition.

Pope Benedict XV raised the shrine to the status of Minor Basilica via the decree Locarni Intra Fines on 11 January 1919. The decree was signed and notarized by the former Vatican Secretary of State, Cardinal Pietro Gasparri.

== Heritage site ==
The UNESCO group designated the shrine as a heritage site for Switzerland on 25 June 2015.

== Similar shrines ==
Several earlier namesake shrine can be found in Tuscany, Italy like the Basilica of Santa Maria del Sasso and modern parish such as in Salinas, California, United States of America.

Another image with the same title is enshrined at the Basilica of Saint Mary and the Martyrs, located above the tomb of Raffaello Sanzio da Urbino. The image features the Blessed Virgin stepping on a rock boulder and was sculpted by the Roman artisan Lorenzetto.

Accordingly, the Basilica of Our Lady of the Holy Rosary in Lajas also has a similar name, Sancta Virgo ad Rupes (Holy Virgin of the Rocks).
