= Vercorin =

Village in the Swiss Alps

Coordinates: 46°15′26″N 7°31′50″E

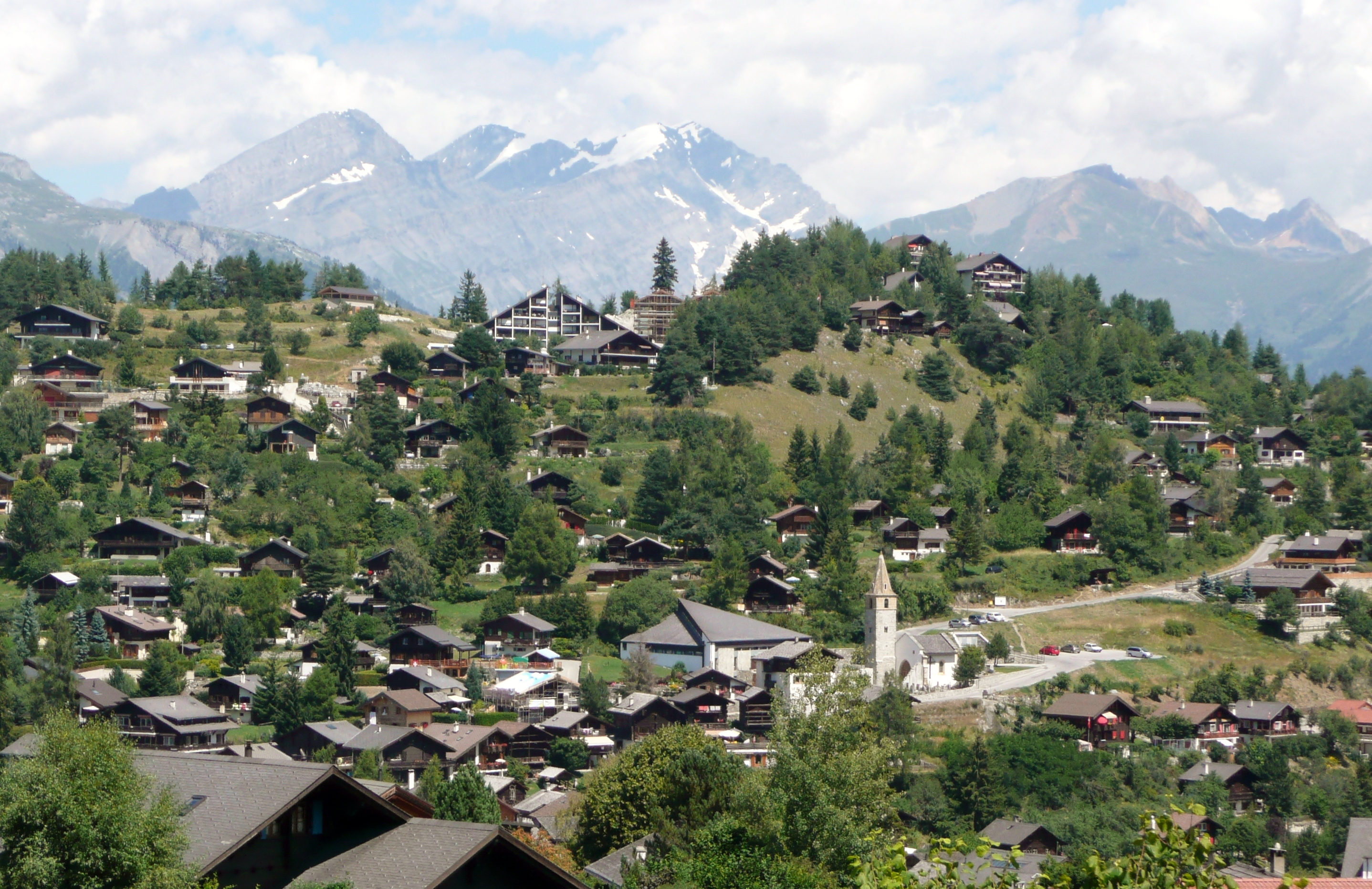
Vercorin with the Balmhorn in background

Vercorin is a village in the Swiss Alps, located in the canton of Valais. The village is situated in the central part of the canton near Sierre, at a height of 1,320 metres (4,330 ft), on a plateau overlooking the Rhone valley. It belongs to the municipality of Chalais.

In winter Vercorin is a ski resort and includes 35 kilometres (22 mi) of prepared slopes on the Crêt du Midi.

== Transportation ==
In addition to daily bus service from Sion and Sierre, there is an aerial tramway (gondola lift) connecting the mountain village of Vercorin with Chalais which runs precisely every 15 minutes.
