= Locarno–Madonna del Sasso funicular =

Funicular railway at Lake Maggiore, Ticino, Switzerland

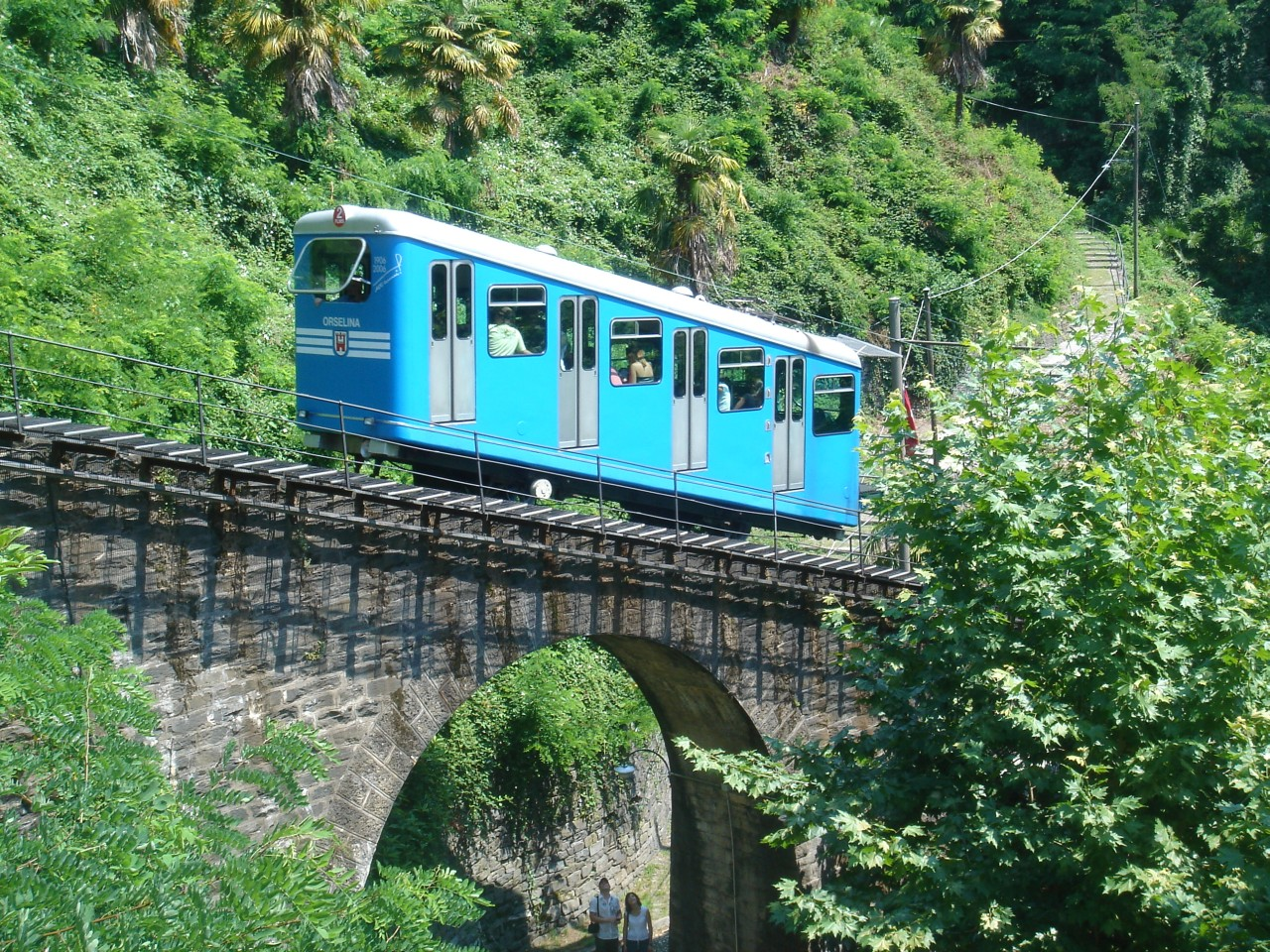
- Car below the top station at Orselina

Overview
- Other name(s): Funicolare Locarno–Madonna del Sasso
- Status: in operation
- Owner: Società della Funicolare Locarno-Madonna del Sasso SA (FLMS)
- Locale: Ticino, Switzerland
- Coordinates: 46.1738°N 8.7959°E
- Termini: "Locarno Funicolare" (46.1713°N 8.7995°E); "Orselina Funicolare" (46.1759°N 8.7925°E)
- Stations: 4+1 (including "Orselina Madonna del Sasso", "Locarno-Muralto Belvedere", "Grand-Hôtel")

Service
- Type: Funicular
- Rolling stock: 2 for 70 passengers each

History
- Opened: 1 March 1906 (119 years ago)

Technical
- Track length: 811 metres (2,661 ft)
- Number of tracks: 1 with passing loop
- Track gauge: 1,000 mm (3 ft 3 3/8 in)
- Electrification: from opening
- Highest elevation: 372 m (1,220 ft)
- Maximum incline: 30%

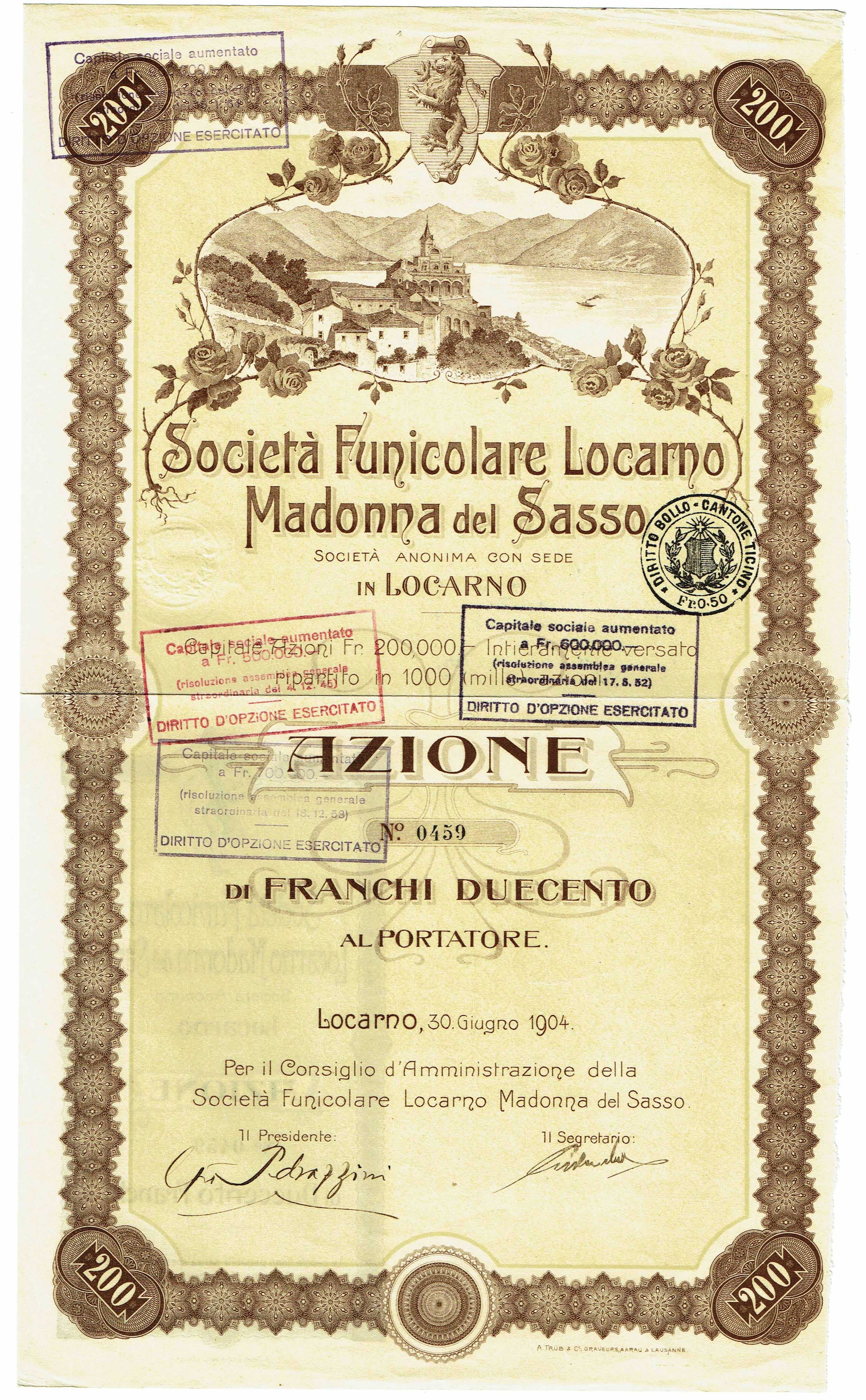
Share of the Soc. Funicolare Locarno–Madonna del Sasso, issued 30. June 1904

The Locarno–Madonna del Sasso funicular, or Funicolare Locarno–Madonna del Sasso (FLMS) is a funicular railway near the city of Locarno in the Swiss canton of Ticino. The line links a lower station in the city center with the pilgrimage site of the Sanctuary of the Madonna del Sasso and the municipality of Orselina. It forms part of the route to the summit of nearby Cimetta mountain.

A concession to build the line was first granted in 1897 and renewed in 1900. Construction began in 1904, and the line was completed in 1906. The original wooden bodies of the cars were replaced with the current metal bodies in 1958.

Besides the terminal stations at Locarno and Orselina, the line serves three intermediate stations at Grand Hôtel, Belvedere, and the Sanctuary, although the Grand Hôtel station is not currently served, as the hotel is closed. At Orselina there is a connection with the cable car to Cardada, which in turn connects with a chairlift to the summit of Cimetta.

From April to October, the line runs every 15 minutes throughout the day. For the rest of the year, and during summer evenings, service is every 30 minutes.

The funicular has the following parameters:

Feature	Value
Number of stops	4 (plus one closed)
Configuration	Single track with passing loop
Track length	811 metres (2,661 ft)
Rise	173 metres (568 ft)
Maximum gradient	30%
Track gauge	1,000 mm (3 ft 3 3/8 in) metre gauge
Number of cars	2
Capacity	70 passengers per car

The funicular is owned by Società della Funicolare Locarno-Madonna del Sasso SA (FLMS).
