= Cimetta =

Mountain in Switzerland

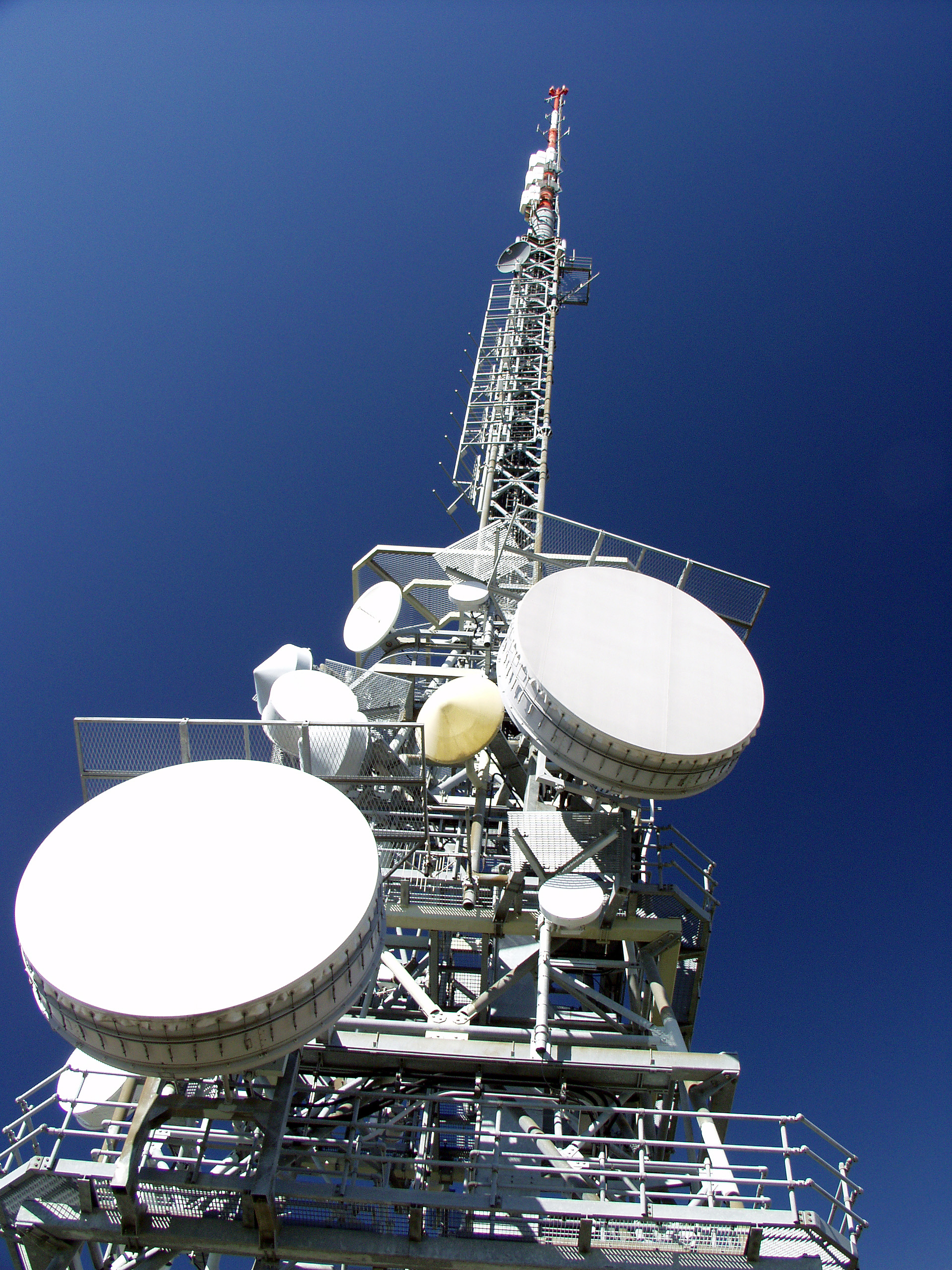
- Radio relay tower on the top

Highest point
- Elevation: 1,671 m (5,482 ft)
- Prominence: 61 m (200 ft)
- Coordinates: 46°12′03″N 8°47′27.8″E

Geography
- Location within Switzerland
- Location: Switzerland
- Parent range: Lepontine Alps

Climbing
- Easiest route: Aerial tramway

Cimetta is a mountain in the Lepontine Alps, it is located above Locarno and Lake Maggiore.

The Locarno–Madonna del Sasso funicular links Locarno city centre with Orselina. From there a cable car connects to Cardada, from which a chair lift runs to the summit.

== Climate ==
Climate data for Cimetta, elevation 1,661 m (5,449 ft), (1991–2020)
Month	Jan	Feb	Mar	Apr	May	Jun	Jul	Aug	Sep	Oct	Nov	Dec	Year
Mean daily maximum °C (°F)	1.5 (34.7)	1.5 (34.7)	4.2 (39.6)	7.5 (45.5)	12.3 (54.1)	16.0 (60.8)	18.3 (64.9)	18.1 (64.6)	13.9 (57.0)	9.8 (49.6)	4.9 (40.8)	2.2 (36.0)	9.2 (48.6)
Daily mean °C (°F)	−1.1 (30.0)	−1.3 (29.7)	0.9 (33.6)	3.7 (38.7)	7.9 (46.2)	11.8 (53.2)	14.0 (57.2)	13.9 (57.0)	9.9 (49.8)	6.3 (43.3)	2.1 (35.8)	−0.4 (31.3)	5.6 (42.1)
Mean daily minimum °C (°F)	−3.6 (25.5)	−3.7 (25.3)	−1.5 (29.3)	1.1 (34.0)	5.2 (41.4)	9.1 (48.4)	11.2 (52.2)	11.3 (52.3)	7.6 (45.7)	4.1 (39.4)	0.0 (32.0)	−2.7 (27.1)	3.2 (37.8)
Average precipitation mm (inches)	48.6 (1.91)	50.0 (1.97)	72.7 (2.86)	131.7 (5.19)	179.4 (7.06)	178.1 (7.01)	147.4 (5.80)	193.5 (7.62)	188.9 (7.44)	196.3 (7.73)	159.3 (6.27)	63.5 (2.50)	1,609.4 (63.36)
Average precipitation days (≥ 1.0 mm)	5.6	5.2	6.6	10.2	12.4	10.6	9.8	10.9	9.3	10.1	10.2	7.0	107.9
Average relative humidity (%)	58	59	63	69	72	73	72	74	77	74	67	59	68
Mean monthly sunshine hours	160.1	168.2	206.4	187.7	200.7	228.0	258.1	235.6	181.9	156.3	130.8	142.0	2,255.8
Percentage possible sunshine	61	61	58	48	46	52	58	57	51	49	50	57	54
Source 1: NOAA
Source 2: MeteoSwiss

== See also ==
- List of mountains of Switzerland accessible by public transport
