= Savognin =

- Former municipality
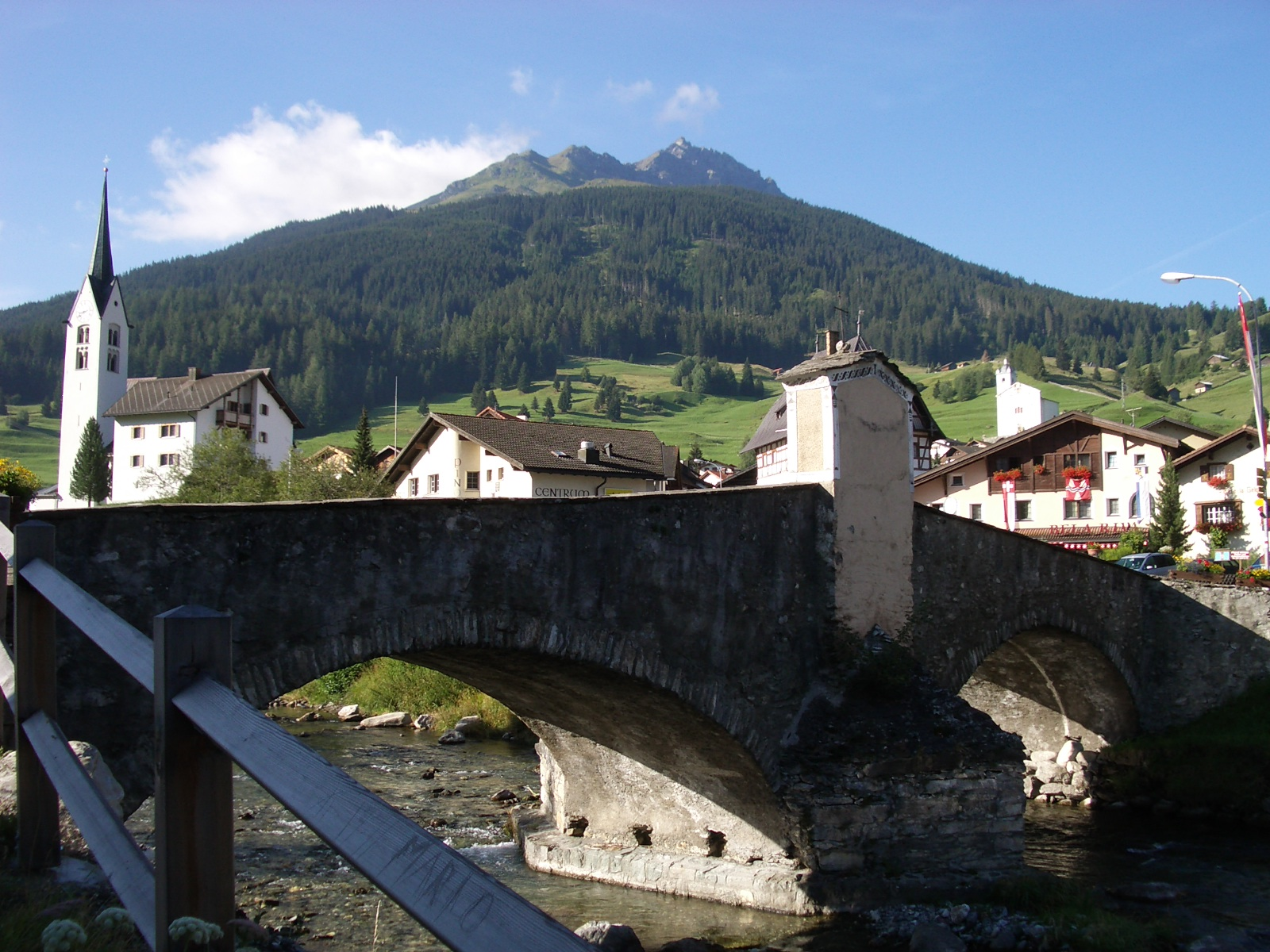

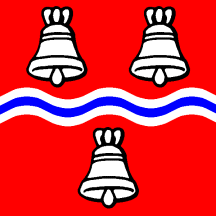
- Flag Coat of arms
- Location of Savognin
- Location within Switzerland Location within Canton of Grisons
- Coordinates: 46°35′N 09°35′E
- Country: Switzerland
- Canton: Grisons
- District: Albula

Area
  - Total: 22.23 km^{2} (8.58 sq mi)
- Elevation: 1,207 m (3,960 ft)

Population (Dec 2014)
  - Total: 1,016
  - Density: 45.70/km^{2} (118.4/sq mi)
- Time zone: UTC+01:00 (CET)
  - Summer (DST): UTC+02:00 (CEST)
- Postal code: 7460
- SFOS number: 3539
- ISO 3166 code: CH-GR
- Surrounded by: Cunter, Filisur, Mulegns, Riom-Parsonz, Tiefencastel, Tinizong-Rona
- Website: www.savognin.ch

Savognin (in local Romansh dialect Suagnign; Italian: Savognino; German: Schweiningen, official name until 1890) is a village and former municipality in the Sursés in the district of Albula in the canton of Grisons in Switzerland. On 1 January 2016 the former municipalities of Bivio, Cunter, Marmorera, Mulegns, Riom-Parsonz, Salouf, Savognin, Sur and Tinizong-Rona merged to form the new municipality of Surses.

The village is the major center of the Gelgia valley, and is a foreign tourist destination in both summer and winter. The official language is the Romansh variety called Surmiran.

== History ==
Savognin is first mentioned in 1154 as Sueningin.

An important Bronze Age settlement is located on the Padnal hill to the south of town. In multiple excavations, many discoveries have been made, mostly from the period between 1800 and 1000 B.C.

At least since the time of the Romans, important travel routes have passed through the Julier and Septimer passes. Savognin came into the possession of the Bishops of Chur in the 13th century. As part of the court of Oberhalbstein, for which Savognin acted as principal town and rural area, the town became a member of the League of God's House. After its sale in 1552, the valley attained full sovereignty as part of the Free State of the Three Leagues.

The cattle industry and traffic through the passes formed the economic framework of the community since the Middle Ages. Periods of increase, for example, after Mount Crap Ses was blown up in 1777, or when the Julier Road was improved between 1820 and 1840, were always followed by periods of decrease, most recently from too much competition after the opening of the Gotthardbahn in 1882. At this stage Savognin was thrown back to being a peasants' village, and missed the next connection to the development of tourism. Jenische families were granted citizenship in the middle of the 19th century, as part of the Law for the fight against Homelessness. The ascent to foreign vacation destination began only in the 1960s, with the construction of hotels, vacation apartments and aerial ropeways (Piz Martegnas); the village was changing.

== Geography ==
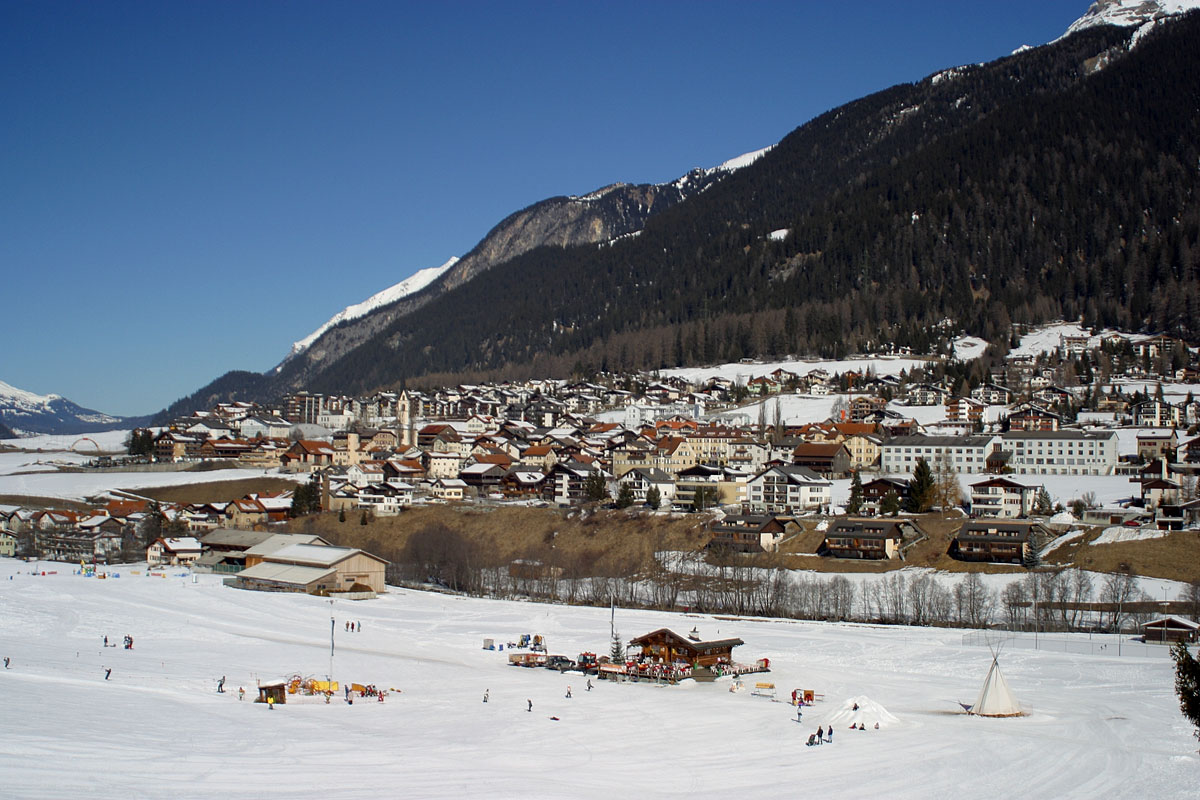
Savognin

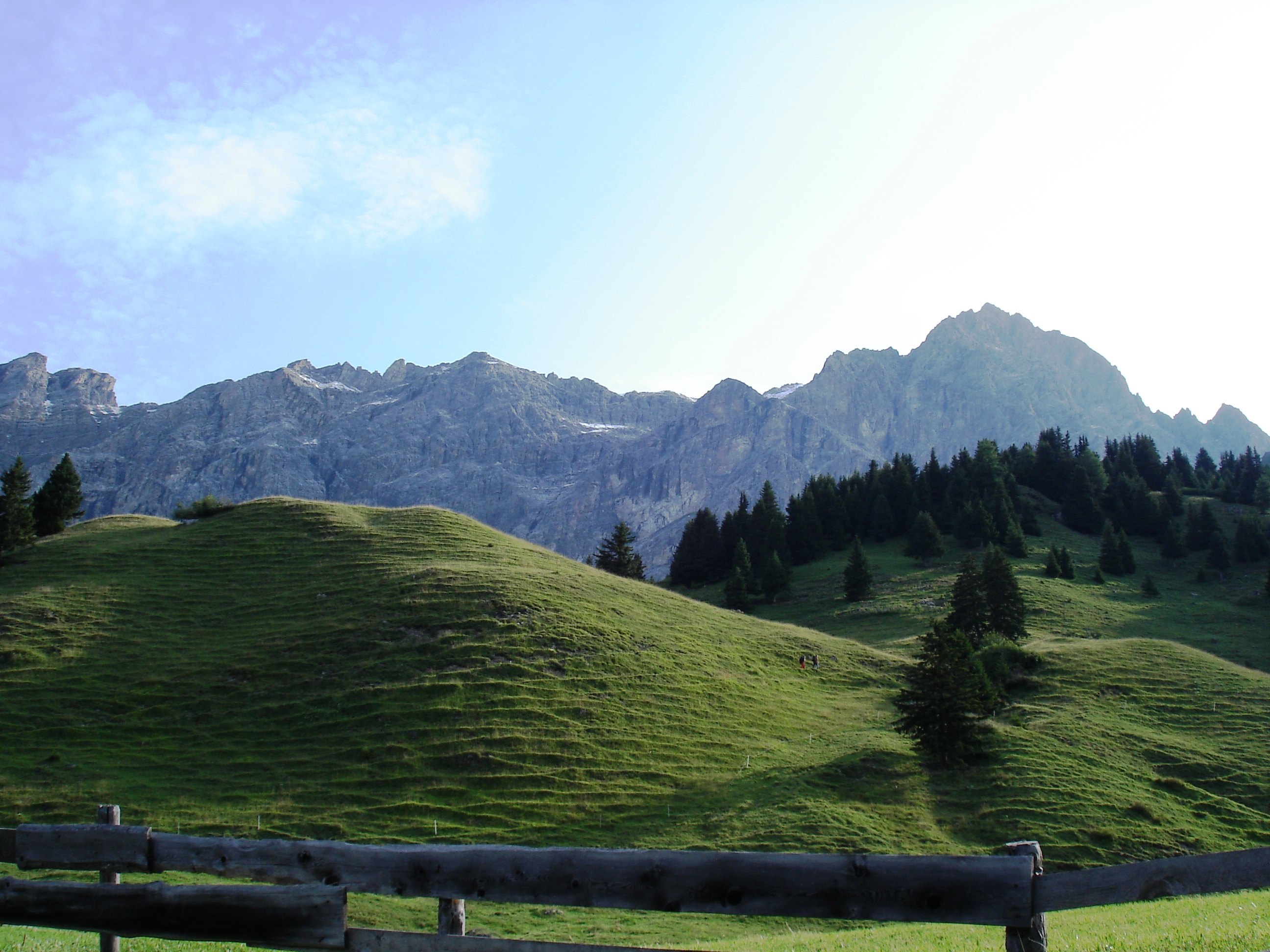
Piz Mitgel 3,159 m (10,364 ft) near Savognin

Aerial view (1947)

Savognin had an area, as of 2006, of 22.2 km^{2} (8.6 sq mi). Of this area, 32.7% is used for agricultural purposes, while 36.2% is forested. Of the rest of the land, 3% is settled (buildings or roads) and the remainder (28.2%) is non-productive (rivers, glaciers or mountains).

The former municipality is located in the Surses sub-district of the Albula district. Savognin lies in a wide depression called Sotgôt, which forms the lower part of the Surses valley (also called Oberhalbstein).

The municipal area includes a piece of the main valley between Mount Piz Arblatsch (elev. 3203m, highest point in the municipality) in the southwest and Mount Piz Mitgel (elev. 3159m) in the northeast. As the three old churches indicate, the town was developed in multiple centers: by the river Gelgia, on the plain rising toward the left hand slope, and along the elevated main road on the right hand slope. The strong construction between 1965 and 1975 filled in the spaces between these village parts, and extended the developed area on the right side of the valley.

Neighboring municipalities are Cunter, Tiefencastel, Filisur, Tinizong-Rona, Mulegns, and Riom-Parsonz.

Until about 1960, the municipality consisted of five distinct villages which were scattered along the course of the Gelgia. The five villages were: Son Mitgel, Naloz, Sot Curt, Sur Curt and Sur Tocf. Until 1890 Savognin was known as Schweiningen.

== Demographics ==
Savognin had a population (as of 2014) of 1016. As of 2008, 14.3% of the population was made up of foreign nationals. Over the last 10 years the population has decreased at a rate of -2.8%.

As of 2000, the gender distribution of the population was 55.0% male and 45.0% female. The age distribution, as of 2000, in Savognin is; 49 people or 15.9% of the population are between 0 and 9 years old. 29 people or 9.4% are 10 to 14, and 14 people or 4.5% are 15 to 19. Of the adult population, 24 people or 7.8% of the population are between 20 and 29 years old. 37 people or 12.0% are 30 to 39, 39 people or 12.7% are 40 to 49, and 36 people or 11.7% are 50 to 59. The senior population distribution is 30 people or 9.7% of the population are between 60 and 69 years old, 28 people or 9.1% are 70 to 79, there are 18 people or 5.8% who are 80 to 89, and there are 4 people or 1.3% who are 90 to 99.

In the 2007 federal election the most popular party was the CVP which received 38.8% of the vote. The next three most popular parties were the SVP (26%), the FDP (18.7%) and the SPS (15.8%).

In Savognin about 66.6% of the population (between age 25–64) have completed either non-mandatory upper secondary education or additional higher education (either university or a Fachhochschule).

The historical population is given in the following table:

year	population
1643	430
1710	530
1802	365
1850	469
1900	444
1960	632
1970	820
1980	852
1990	877
2000	477
2004	957

== Coat of arms ==
Blazon: Red, sectioned by a silver-bordered blue river-strip, in the upper portion, two silver bells, in the lower, one.

The coat of arms symbolizes the location along the river and the three churches of the town.

== Languages ==
Most of the population (as of 2000) speaks Romansh (53.1%), with German being second most common (36.6%) and Italian being third ( 3.6%).

Languages in Savognin
Languages	Census 1980		Census 1990		Census 2000	
Languages	Number	Percent	Number	Percent	Number	Percent
German	212	24.88%	274	31.24%	323	36.62%
Romansh	562	65.96%	546	62.26%	468	53.06%
Italian	42	4.93%	25	2.85%	32	3.63%
Population	852	100%	877	100%	882	100%

=== Economy and Transportation ===
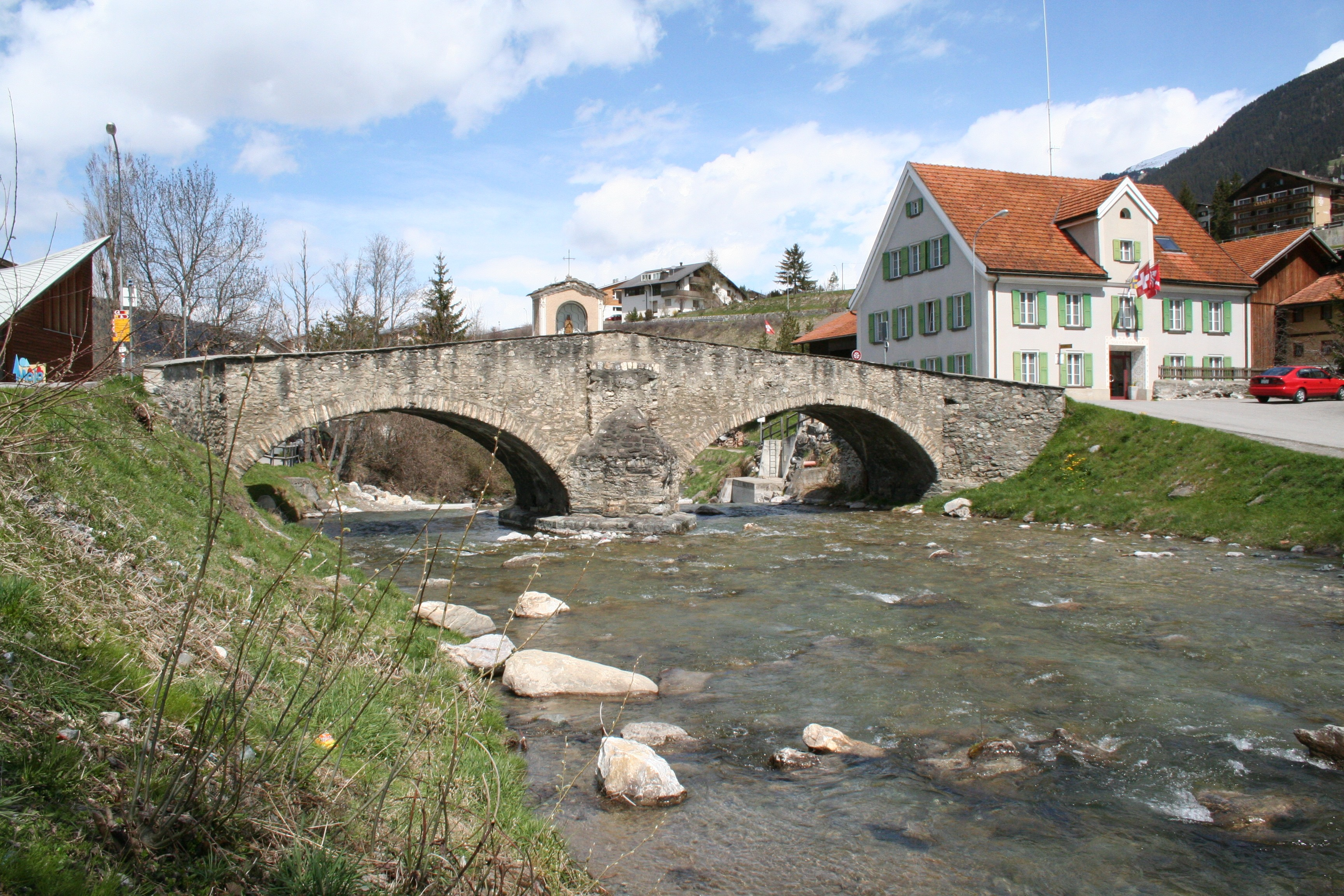
The Gelgia in Savognin

As seat of the district administration, district hospital, and secondary school, Savognin forms the center of the valley. The most important sector is tourism; in one year about 200,000 rooms are let. The ski areas on Mounts Piz Martegnas and Val Nandro are accessible by multiple aerial lifts.

Savognin is one Highway 3, which goes from Chur to Engadin via Lenzerheide and the Julier pass. A post route also follows this highway. Most trips end in Bivio, some drive on to St. Moritz. An additional post route connects the nearby villages of Riom, Parsonz, and Salouf.

Savognin has an unemployment rate of 0.75%. As of 2005, there were 71 people employed in the primary economic sector and about 29 businesses involved in this sector. 146 people are employed in the secondary sector and there are 21 businesses in this sector. 392 people are employed in the tertiary sector, with 64 businesses in this sector.

== Heritage sites of national significance ==
The Son Martegn church and the Padnal/Mot la Cresta (a Bronze Age settlement) are listed as Swiss heritage sites of national significance.

== Tourist attractions ==
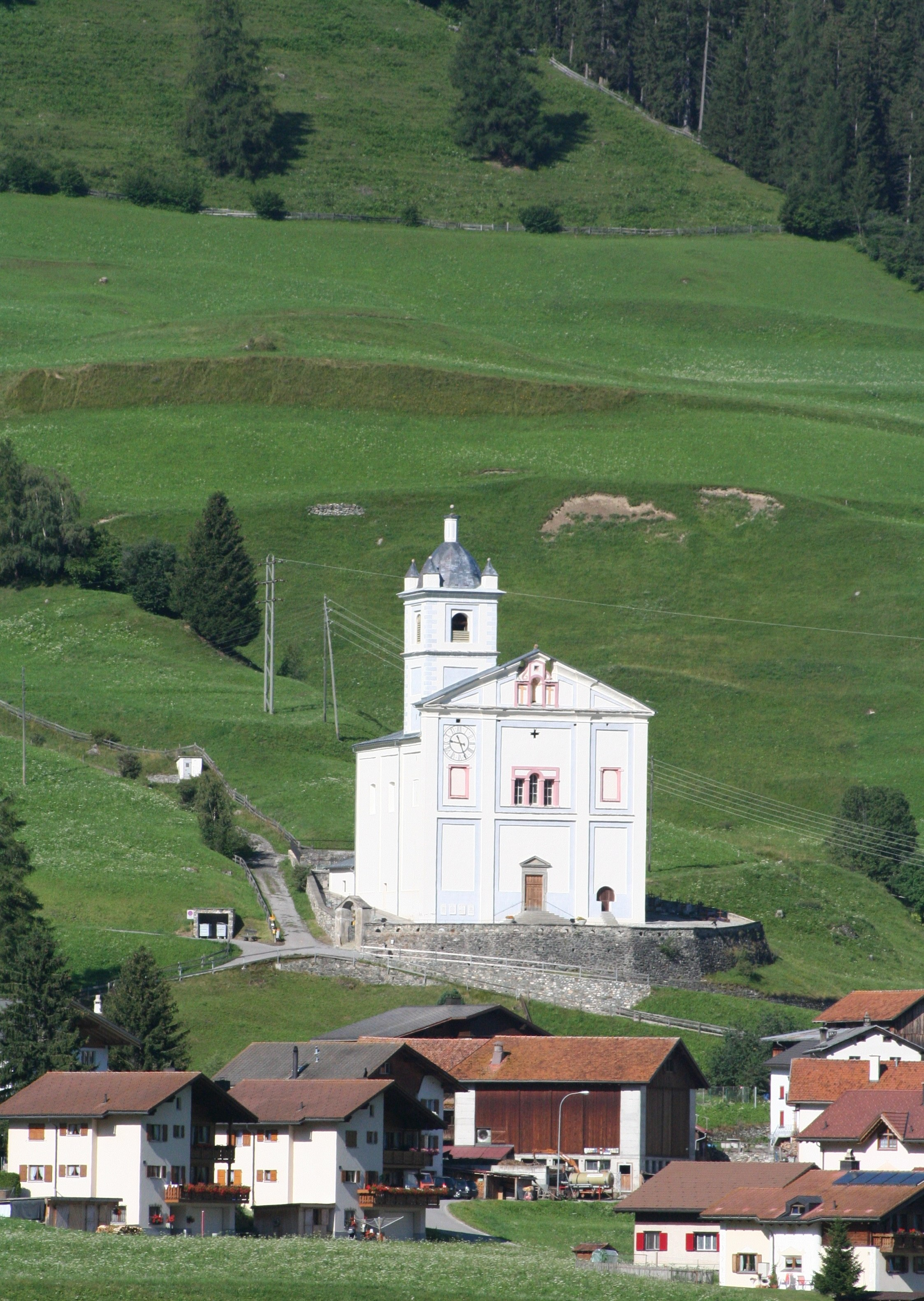
Son Mitgel Church

Savognin has three Catholic churches of the Baroque period.

- Parish church Nossadonna, built 1643; has additional Gothic features.
- Church Son Martegn, built in 1677 in the Central Form style, with a cross-shaped base. Has a monumental fresco painted in 1681 by Carlo Nuvolone from Milan.
- Church Son Mitgel, built in 1663, an eight-sided Central Form building with an older steeple, altars from 1693 to 1694,

as well as stately citizens' homes, such as the Peterelli House on the main street, and the Amilcar House near the parish church, with its south-German-influenced half-timbered style. The Gelgia bridge in the community of Sot Curt is from 1682. A regional museum was established in a 16th-century farmhouse in 1982.

== Notable residents ==
The Italian painter Giovanni Segantini lived in Savognin between 1886 and 1894, and developed his style there. He is famous for his landscapes with Mounts Piz Curver and Piz Tiossa in the background.

== Weather ==
Savognin has an average of 104.3 days of rain per year and on average receives 917 mm (36.1 in) of precipitation. The wettest month is August during which time Savognin receives an average of 117 mm (4.6 in) of precipitation. During this month there is precipitation for an average of 11.8 days. The driest month of the year is February with an average of 42 mm (1.7 in) of precipitation over 11.8 days.
