= Spitzhorn =

Mountain in Switzerland

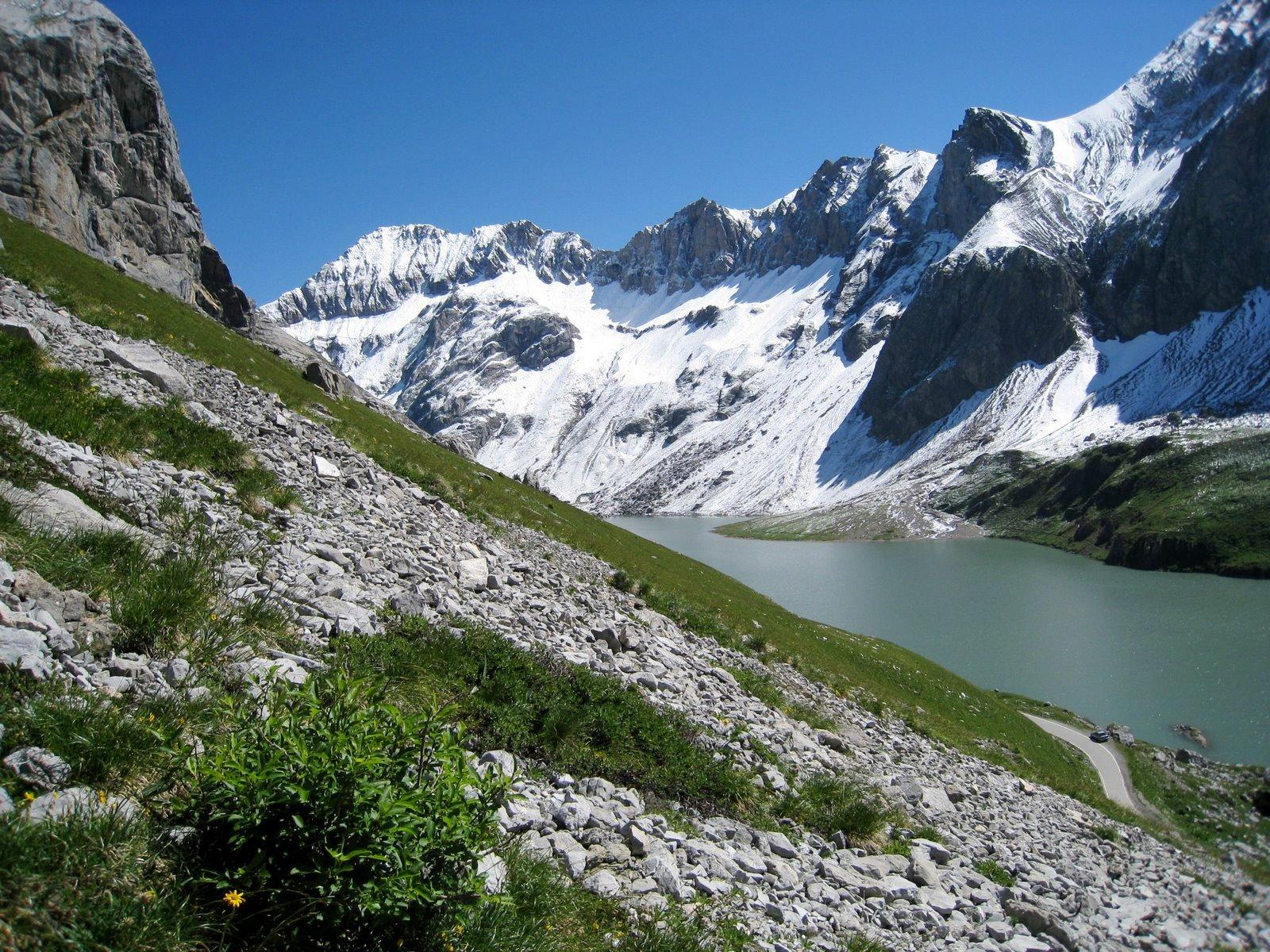
- The Spitzhorn (centre-left) from the Sanetsch lake

Highest point
- Elevation: 2,807 m (9,209 ft)
- Prominence: 209 m (686 ft)
- Parent peak: Wildhorn
- Coordinates: 46°22′30.1″N 7°18′37.6″E

Geography
- Location within Switzerland
- Location: Bern/Valais, Switzerland
- Parent range: Bernese Alps

The Spitzhorn is a mountain of the Bernese Alps, located on the border between the Swiss cantons of Bern and Valais. It lies east of Gsteig (Bern) and north of the Sanetsch lake (Valais). It belongs to the massif of the Wildhorn.
