= Piz Sezner =

Mountain in Switzerland

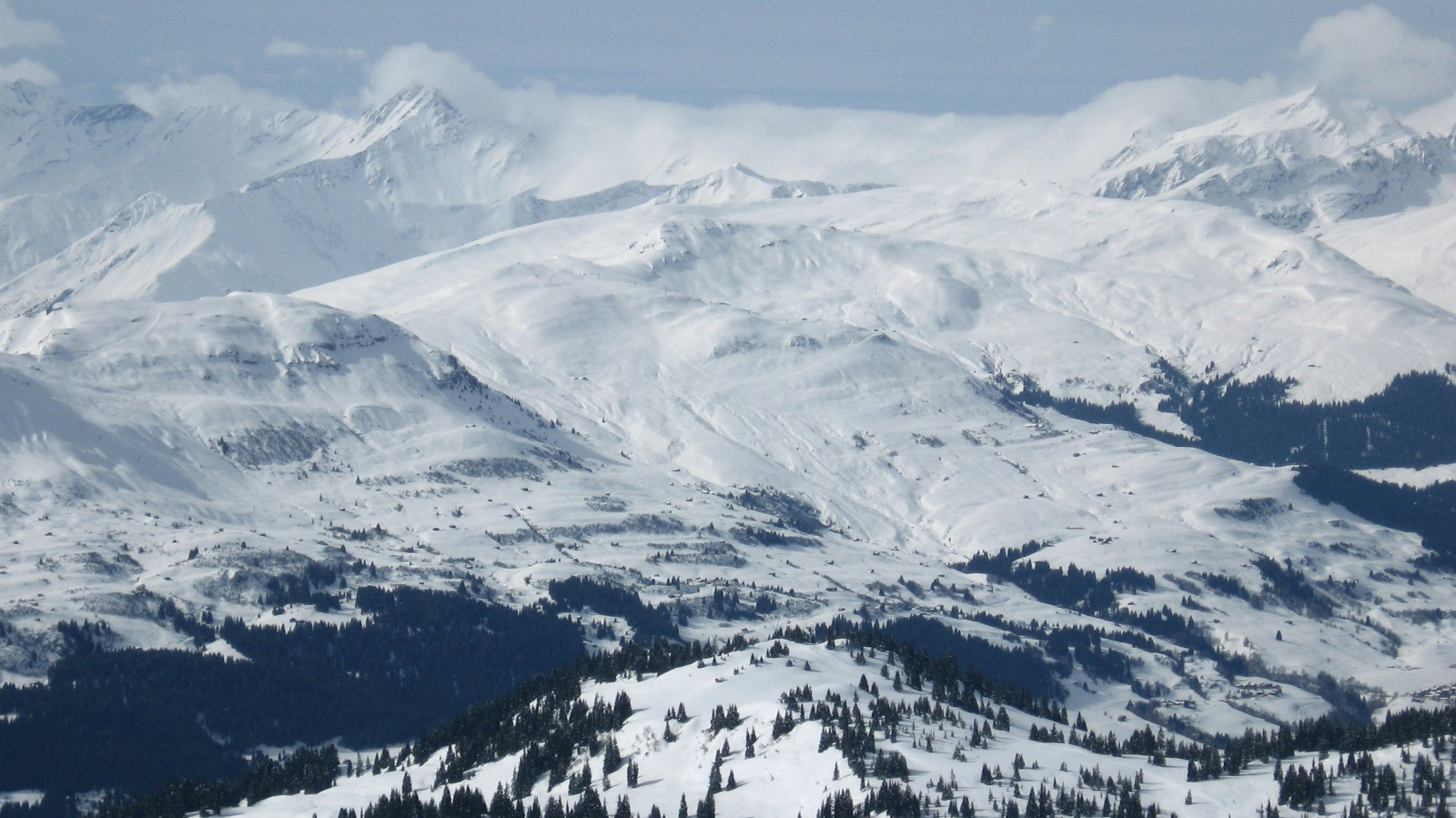
- Piz Sezner in the back. left is the Piz Mundaun, in the clouds is the Piz Terri

Highest point
- Elevation: 2,310 m (7,580 ft)
- Prominence: 236 m (774 ft)
- Parent peak: Rheinwaldhorn
- Coordinates: 46°42′28.8″N 9°06′19.4″E

Geography
- Location within Switzerland
- Location: Graubünden, Switzerland
- Parent range: Lepontine Alps

Piz Sezner (2,310 m) is a mountain of the Swiss Lepontine Alps, overlooking Obersaxen in the canton of Graubünden. It is located between the main Rhine valley and the Val Lumnezia.

In winter, the mountain is part of a ski area. A cable car station is located west of the summit at 2,269 metres.

== See also ==
- List of mountains of Switzerland accessible by public transport
