= Tour de Famelon =

Mountain in Switzerland

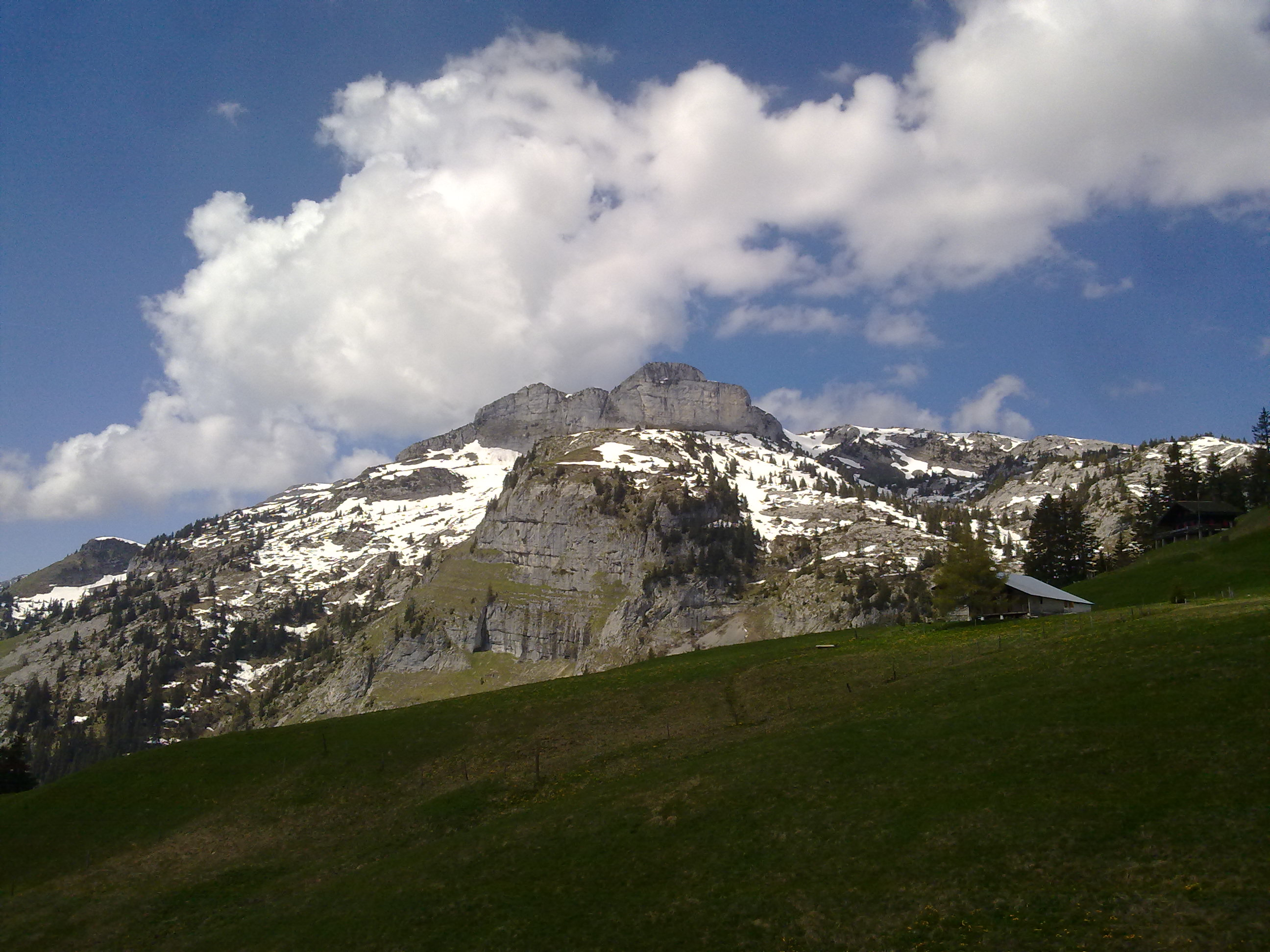
- West side

Highest point
- Elevation: 2,143 m (7,031 ft)
- Prominence: 78 m (256 ft)
- Parent peak: Tour d'Aï
- Coordinates: 46°22′59″N 7°01′25″E

Geography
- Location within Switzerland
- Location: Vaud, Switzerland
- Parent range: Swiss Prealps

Climbing
- Easiest route: Trail leading to the summit

The Tour de Famelon (2,143 m) is a mountain of the Swiss Prealps, located north of Leysin in the canton of Vaud. It lies between the Tour de Mayen and the Pierre du Moëllé, on the range lying between the lake of Hongrin and the valley of Ormont Dessous and Ormont Dessus.
