= Pic Chaussy =

Mountain in Switzerland

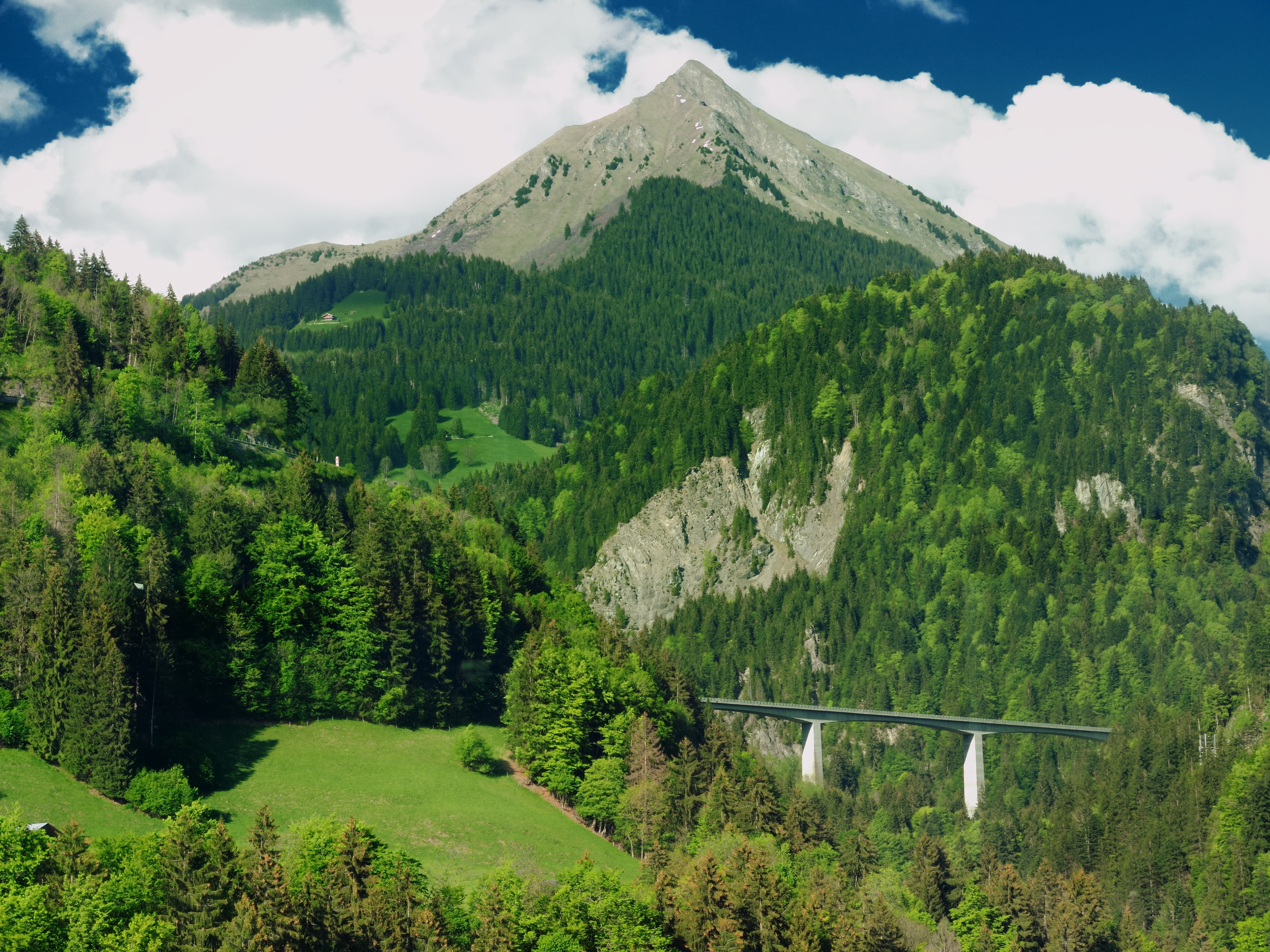
- View from the Ormonts valley (southwest side)

Highest point
- Elevation: 2,351 m (7,713 ft)
- Prominence: 113 m (371 ft)
- Parent peak: Le Tarent
- Coordinates: 46°22′37.6″N 7°6′46″E

Geography
- Location within Switzerland
- Location: Vaud, Switzerland
- Parent range: Bernese Alps

Pic Chaussy is a mountain of the Vaud Alps, overlooking Les Diablerets to the south. On its northern side lies the Lac Lioson, whilst the Col des Mosses pass flanks its western side. To the east, a ridgeline connects to the peaks of the Châtillon and Le Tarent. Its summit reaches an altitude of 2,351 metres (7,713 ft).

The peak lies on the border between the municipalities of Ormont-Dessous and Ormont-Dessus, both in the Swiss canton of Vaud.

== Skiing ==
A gondola was built in 1962 from the Mosses pass to the summit, with a stop at the Lake Lioson. The gondola shut down in 1987 and the last infrastructure was brought down in 2009, due to the protests of swiss ecologists that were unhappy about Les Mosses' choice of replacing the older cabin lift.
