= Pierre du Moëllé =

- Location within Switzerland
- Elevation: 1,661 metres (5,449 ft)
- Traversed by: Road

Third Approach
- Location: Vaud, Switzerland
- Range: Alps
- Coordinates: 46°23′30″N 07°02′46″E

The Pierre du Moëllé (el. 1661 m.) is a high mountain pass in the Swiss Alps, connecting Leysin to the lake of Hongrin in the canton of Vaud. The pass lies between the Tour de Famelon and the Gros Van.
