= Gros Van =

Mountain in Switzerland

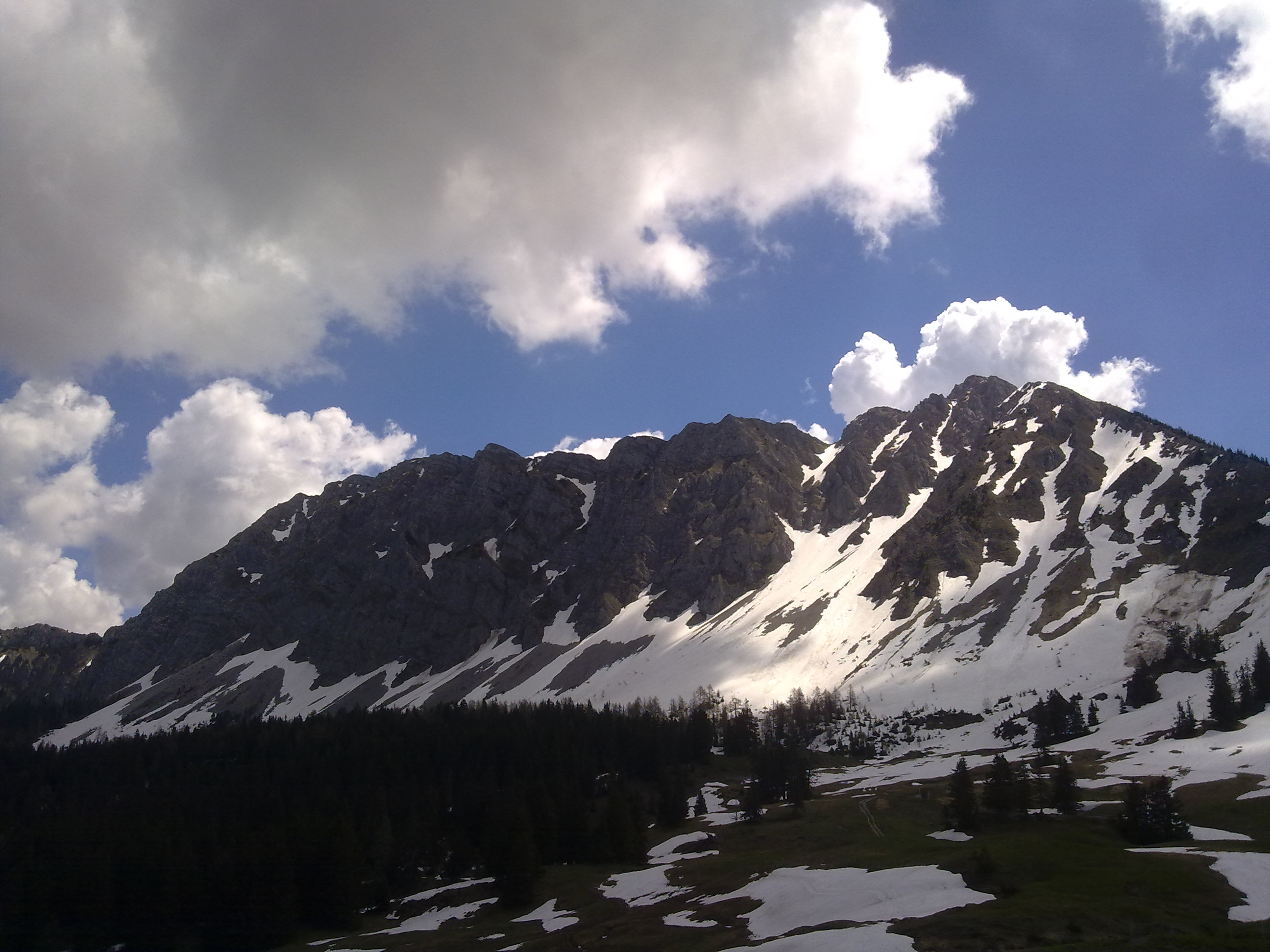
- West side

Highest point
- Elevation: 2,189 m (7,182 ft)
- Prominence: 528 m (1,732 ft)
- Parent peak: Tour d'Aï
- Coordinates: 46°23′46.5″N 7°4′9″E

Geography
- Location within Switzerland
- Location: Vaud, Switzerland
- Parent range: Swiss Prealps

The Gros Van (2,189 m) is a mountain of the Swiss Prealps, overlooking the Col des Mosses in the canton of Vaud. It lies on the range between the Lac de l'Hongrin and the valley of Ormont-Dessous.
