= Mont d'Or (Alps) =

Mountain in Switzerland

- View from Le Chamossaire

Highest point
- Elevation: 2,175 m (7,136 ft)
- Prominence: 77 m (253 ft)
- Parent peak: Gros Van
- Listing: Mountains of Switzerland
- Coordinates: 46°23′18″N 7°3′36.5″E

Geography
- Location within Switzerland
- Location: Vaud, Switzerland
- Parent range: Swiss Prealps

Mont d'Or (2,175 m) is a mountain of the Bernese Alps of Switzerland, overlooking Le Sépey in the canton of Vaud. It lies on the range between the Lac de l'Hongrin and the valley of Ormont-Dessous, and flanks the Col des Mosses pass.
