= Lac Lioson =

Lake in Vaud, Switzerland

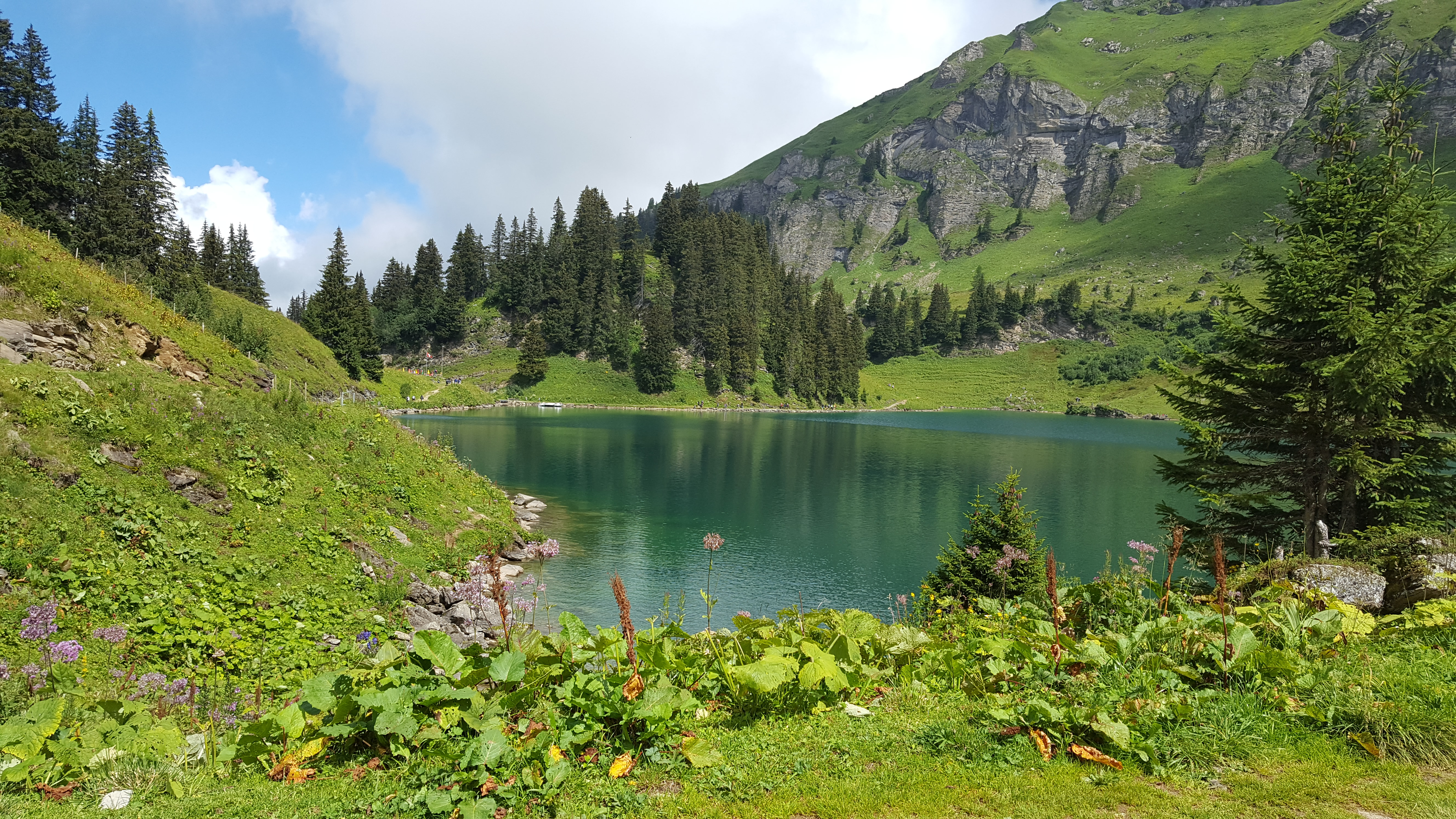

- Location within Canton of Vaud Location within Switzerland Location within Alps
- Interactive map of Lac Lioson
- Location: Vaud
- Coordinates: 46°23′11″N 7°7′43″E
- Primary outflows: Hongrin (river) going to the Lac de l'Hongrin
- Basin countries: Switzerland
- Surface area: 7 ha (17 acres)
- Surface elevation: 1,848 m (6,063 ft)

Lac Lioson is a lake in the municipality of Ormont-Dessous, near Les Mosses, in the canton of Vaud, Switzerland. Its surface area is 7 ha (17 acres).

The lake is used for fishing and ice diving.

== See also ==
- List of mountain lakes of Switzerland
- Lac de l'Hongrin
