= Kuklos =

Kuklos (κύκλος) means "ring" or "circle" in Greek, and may also refer to:

- Kuklos Adelphon, a defunct fraternity which was founded at the University of North Carolina in 1812
- Kuklos Anankes, the circle of necessity in mysticism
- Kuklos, a revolving restaurant atop the Berneuse in the Swiss Alps
- Ku Klux Klan, an American terrorist and political movement that took its name from the Greek term
- Fitzwater Wray (c.1870–1938), British cycling journalist, who used the pseudonym Kuklos
