= Mont d'Or =

Mont d'Or (from French: "golden mountain") may refer to:

- Vacherin Mont d'Or, a type of cheese
- Mont d'Or (Alps), a mountain in Switzerland
- Mont d'Or (Jura Mountains), a mountain in France

== See also ==
- Monte d'Oro, a mountain on the island of Corsica, France
