= Tour de Mayen =

Mountain in Switzerland

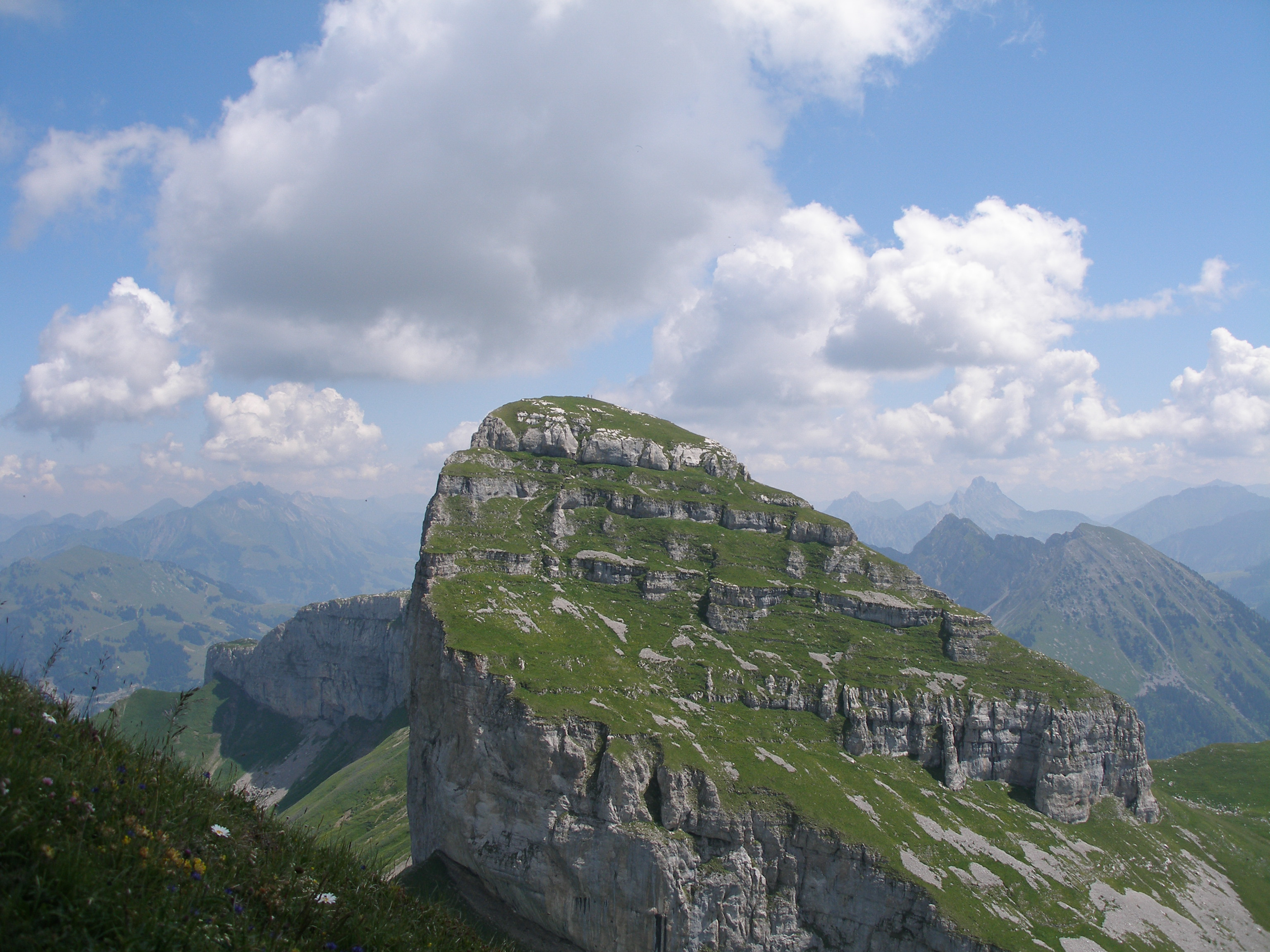
- View from Tour d'Aï (west side)

Highest point
- Elevation: 2,327 m (7,635 ft)
- Prominence: 185 m (607 ft)
- Parent peak: Tour d'Aï
- Coordinates: 46°22′28″N 7°0′30″E

Geography
- Location within Switzerland
- Location: Vaud, Switzerland
- Parent range: Swiss Prealps

Climbing
- Easiest route: Trail leading to the summit

The Tour de Mayen (2,327 m) is a mountain of the Swiss Prealps, located north of Leysin in the canton of Vaud. It lies east of the Tour d'Aï, on the range lying between the lake of Hongrins and the valley of Ormont Dessous and Ormont Dessus.
