= Edmond Plawczyk =

French speed snowboarder (born 1971)

Edmond Plawczyk (born 10 October 1971) is a French and swiss speed snowboarder living in Chateau d'Oex (Switzerland). In April, 2015, he became the fastest snowboarder in the world, with a speed of 203 km/h.

== Early life and education ==
Plawczyk grew up in Nice, France. His father was a championship decathlon runner and his grandfather Jerzy Plawczyk was an Olympic high-jumper. He studied at the Ecole hôtelière de Nice.

== Career ==
Plawczyk worked part-time in the food industry as a caterer and head cook while participating in various sports. He completed the first descent of the steepest couloir in the French Alps: Lourouza couloir/Charvin couloir - north couloir of the Etendard.

From 1996-1999 Plawczyk completed the Mountain Surf Challenge. In 1996 in Vars, he set the third fastest world snowboard speed performance at 168 km/h. In 1997, he set a new world snowboard speed record of 190, 124 km/h. In 2000, he took part in Mad Master Vars in France (free ride and speed).

In April, 2015, he was clocked at 203 km/h to take the world speed record for snowboarding. As of April 2026 he continued to hold the record.

Plawczyk is a member of the monohull “senso one” sailing team. He has participated in a number of speed challenges, including a Mediterranean crossing and competing for the Jules Verne Trophy.

== Personal ==
Plawczyk was married in 2006. The couple have three daughters. In 2026 he lives in Château-d'Œx.
