= Françoise Roch-Ramel =

Swiss pharmacologist

- Born: Françoise Ramel; 20 September 1931
- Died: 26 June 2001 (aged 69)

Academic work
- Discipline: Pharmacologist
- Sub-discipline: Expert on renal excretion
- Institutions: University of Lausanne

Françoise Roch-Ramel (née Ramel; 20 September 1931 – 26 June 2001) was a Swiss pharmacologist and a leading expert on the renal transport of organic anions and cations, especially uric acid.

== Life and work ==
Born to Edwin Ramel and raised in Château-d'Œx, Switzerland, her major research focus was the renal excretion of drugs and other xenobiotics. She was a professor at the Department of Pharmacology and Toxicology at the University of Lausanne, where she was employed in the early 1960s as an assistant of Professor George Peters.

From 1975 to 1990, Roch-Ramel was an associate professor at the University of Lausanne.

According to Simmonds, she studied "renal transport of organic anions and cations, especially uric acid, in the kidney" since the beginning of her academic career. To do so, Roch-Ramel created her own micro-puncture techniques to study ion transport in several different mammalian species including humans, cebus monkeys, pigs, rats, cats, rabbits, mongrel dogs and Dalmatian dogs. Of particular focus was the renal excretion of drugs and other xenobiotics. These studies included drug interactions and other clinical aspects of renal organic ion transport of cardiac glycosides, antibiotics and chemotherapy drugs.

Her published work includes both academic papers as well as chapter contributions to many major texts including Diseases of the Kidney. She was known to pay scrupulous attention to the methodology described in these publications and realized that the problems attached to the measurement of compounds, such as uric acid, had great importance on the validity of future academic studies.

== Personal life ==
She married Alfred Roch in 1958.

== Selected works ==
- Roch-Ramel, Françoise, Barbara Guisan, and Jacques Diezi. "Effects of uricosuric and antiuricosuric agents on urate transport in human brush-border membrane vesicles." Journal of Pharmacology and Experimental Therapeutics 280, no. 2 (1997): 839-845.
- Burnier, Michel, Françoise Roch-Ramel, and Hans R. Brunner. "Renal effects of angiotensin II receptor blockade in normotensive subjects." Kidney international 49, no. 6 (1996): 1787-1790.
- Roch-Ramel, Françoise. "An enzymic and fluorophotometric method for estimating urea concentrations in nanoliter specimens." Analytical biochemistry 21, no. 3 (1967): 372-381.
