= Berneuse =

Mountain in Switzerland

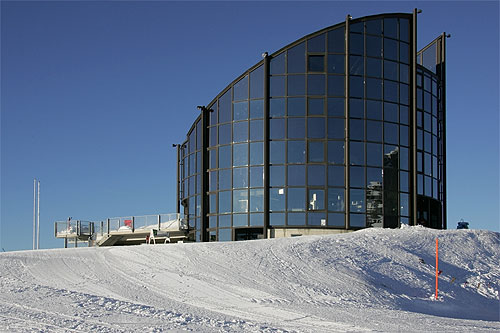
- The revolving restaurant on the top

Highest point
- Elevation: 2,045 m (6,709 ft)
- Prominence: 140 m (460 ft)
- Parent peak: Tour d'Aï
- Coordinates: 46°21′34.5″N 7°0′7.8″E

Geography
- Location within Switzerland
- Location: Leysin, Vaud, Switzerland
- Parent range: Vaud Alps

Climbing
- Easiest route: Aerial tramway

The Berneuse (or la Berneuse) is a mountain of the western Bernese Alps, above Leysin in the canton of Vaud. It lies on the range east of the Rhone valley, culminating at the Tour d'Aï.

Its summit (2,045 m) is a popular destination, hosting the Kuklos, a revolving restaurant accessible by cable cabin from town. On a clear day, Lake Geneva is visible from this summit.

== See also ==
- List of mountains of Switzerland accessible by public transport
