= Tour d'Aï =

Mountain in Switzerland

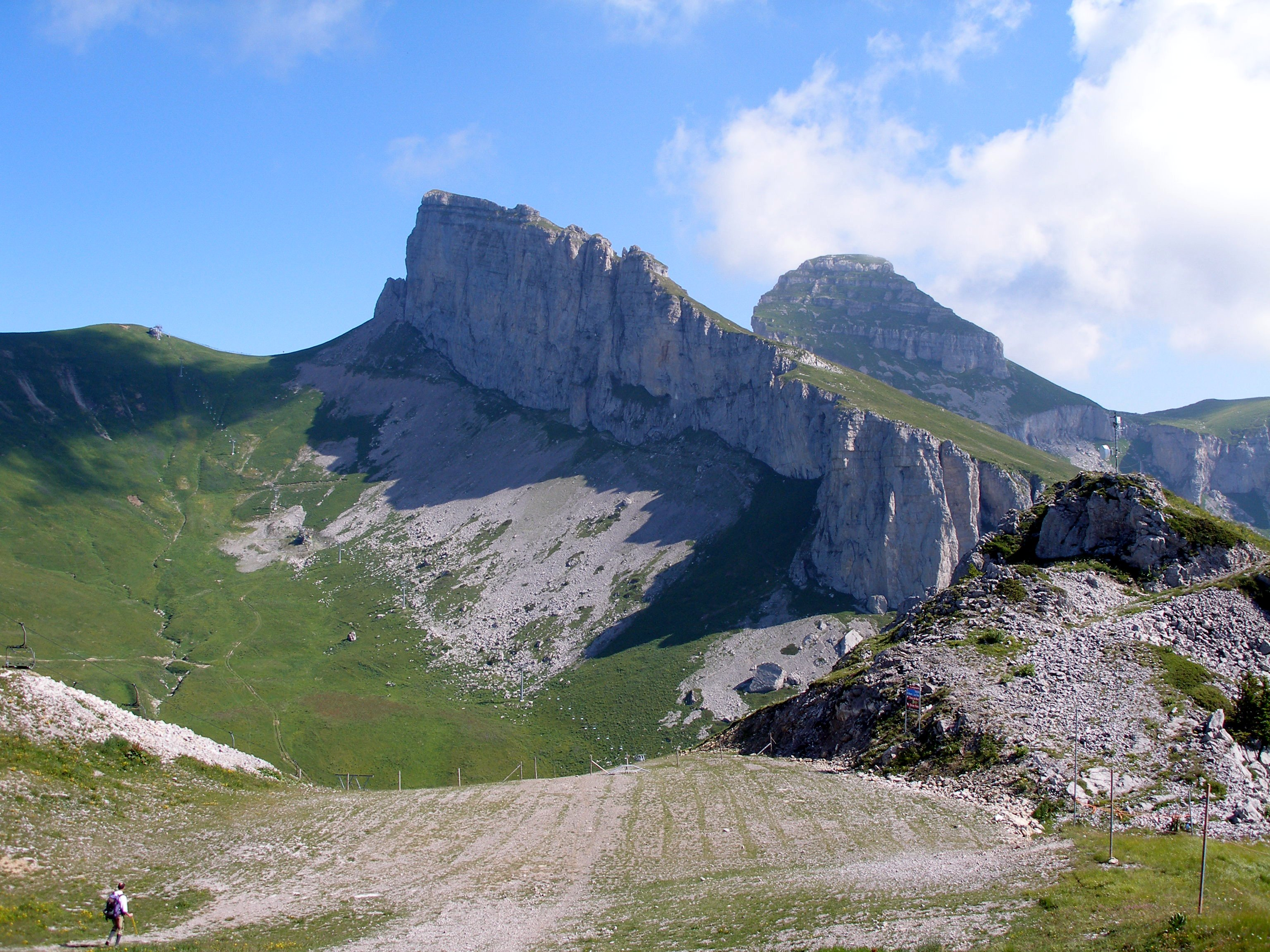

Highest point
- Elevation: 2,331 m (7,648 ft)
- Prominence: 886 m (2,907 ft)
- Coordinates: 46°22′19.6″N 7°00′07.2″E

Geography
- Location within Switzerland
- Location: Vaud, Switzerland
- Parent range: Vaud Alps

The Tour d'Aï is a mountain in the western Bernese Alps, overlooking Leysin in the canton of Vaud. It is located near the Tour de Mayen, on the range lying between the Rhone and Col des Mosses, south of Lake Geneva, from where both summits can be easily seen.

The summit can be accessed via a trail on its northern slopes, from the alp of Aï, near the Berneuse, above Leysin.

Tour d'Aï and Tour de Mayen
