= Château-d'Œx =

Municipality in Vaud, Switzerland

- Municipality
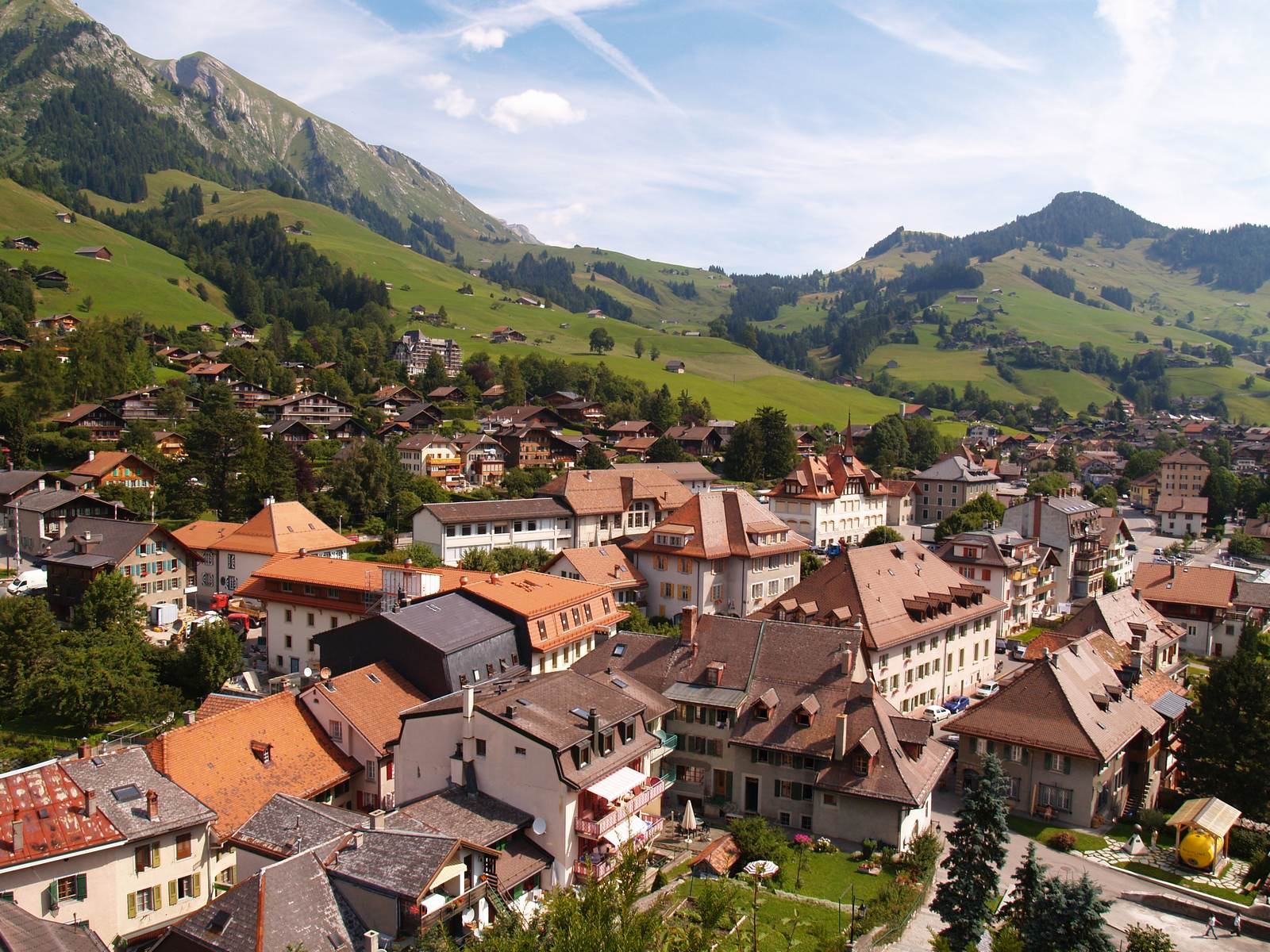

- Flag Coat of arms
- Location of Château-d'Œx
- Location within Switzerland Location within Canton of Vaud
- Coordinates: 46°28′N 7°7′E
- Country: Switzerland
- Canton: Vaud
- District: Riviera-Pays-d'Enhaut

Government
  - Mayor: Syndic

Area
  - Total: 113.76 km^{2} (43.92 sq mi)
- Elevation: 958 m (3,143 ft)

Population (2003)
  - Total: 3,034
  - Density: 26.67/km^{2} (69.08/sq mi)
- Time zone: UTC+01:00 (CET)
  - Summer (DST): UTC+02:00 (CEST)
- Postal code: 1660
- SFOS number: 5841
- ISO 3166 code: CH-VD
- Surrounded by: Val-de-Charmey (FR), Grandvillard (FR), Gsteig bei Gstaad (BE), Haut-Intyamon (FR), Ormont-Dessous, Ormont-Dessus, Rossinière, Rougemont, Saanen (BE), Villeneuve
- Website: chateaudoex-admin.ch

Château-d'Œx (French pronunciation: [ʃɑto dɛ]) is a municipality in the canton of Vaud in Switzerland. It is in the district of Riviera-Pays-d'Enhaut.

== History ==
Château-d'Œx is first mentioned in 1115 as Oit, Oyz, Oix and Oyez.

=== Prehistoric settlements ===
During the late Paleolithic and Mesolithic (9500 BC to at least 6000 BC) caves around Château-d'Œx served as a seasonal settlement. Bronze Age knives indicate that there was a settlement during that era as well. Many of the local names (combe = valley, joeur = forest, man = rock) and the local dialect are the only traces of a Celtic settlement in the area. The lack of iron ore and the sparseness of the soil probably prevented the romanization of lowland valleys. During the Gallo-Roman era, the region may have been only sparsely populated. By the 10th century, the Alamannic settlements had only reached Le Vanel but then spread even higher and reached the pastures in L'Étivaz in the southern part of the municipality. The valley was known as the high Gau or Ogo. The name may have come from the word for Ox or be a form of Äesch, (or ash).

=== Medieval history ===
In the 10th century, the Count of Gruyere conquered La Tine and the Creux de l'Enfer. Subsequently, it was merged with Rossinière to form a district. The church of St. Donat was consecrated and first mentioned in 1175. The village church was under the authority of the Cluniac Priory of Rougemont, which was founded in 1080.

At the beginning of the 14th century, the castle at La Motte was rebuilt for the Counts of Gruyere. Another stronghold probably stood on the rocky spur which was known as Château Cottier. After clearing the woods, the region was intensively farmed and produced barley, hay, hemp and cheese. In 1388 the villagers threw off the obligation to serve the nobility. Then, in 1403, against the wishes of the Count of Gruyères, the villagers joined a limited alliance with Bern.

=== Growth during the Early Modern era ===
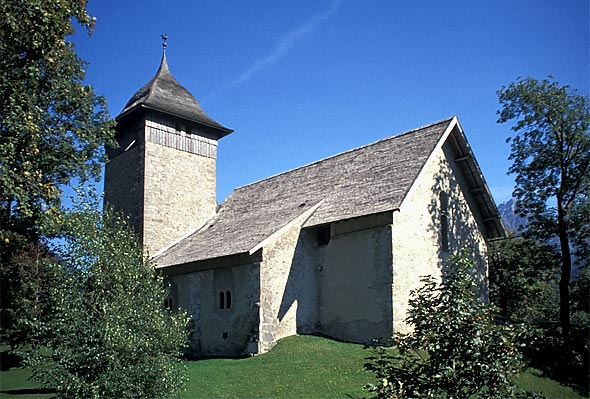
Old church in Château-d'Œx

In 1555 Bern received the upper part of the county of Gruyere including Château-d'Œx. It became part of the German-speaking bailiwick of Saanen. The rights and freedoms of the villagers were now based on Bernese law and not on the Land Law of Moudon. However, the village church was still part of the parish under the collegiate church of Lausanne. Following the Protestant Reformation in 1555, the parish also included Etivaz until 1713.

Under Bernese rule, the economy experienced a strong upswing. The common land was divided and sold before the end of the 16th century. The alpine pastures were leased to private cheesemakers, who there produced Gruyère cheese. In the 18th century, the inhabitants of the municipality went over the Col de Jaman to sell the cheese, from the approximately 2,000 cows, at the market in Vevey. From there, it went to Marseille where it was exported to Asia and America.

=== End of the Ancien Régime and Modern Château-d'Œx ===
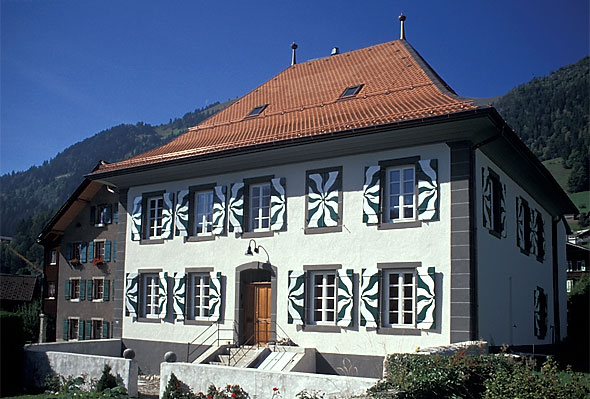
House in the historic center of Château-d'Œx

In 1798, Château-d'Œx came to the newly formed Canton of Léman. In 1800, a fire destroyed the wooden houses on the central hill. The houses had been built in this style and on the hill to avoid property taxes. Thanks to the efforts of the Dean Philippe-Sirice Bridel enough money was raised to rebuild the houses in stone. The municipality hired masons from Savoy, carpenters from Simmental and plasterers from the lower Gruyere lands lower uplands. In 1803, the Canton of Léman was dissolved with the Act of Mediation and the municipality became part of the new canton of Vaud.

In 1849, the Institute Henchoz opened as a preparatory gymnasium, which replaced the older Latin school. The primary school received a new building in 1907. Starting in 1847 a parish of the Free Church of the Canton of Vaud was established with two priests. The Catholic parish was established in 1896 and the Anglican church parish was created in 1899. Other religious communities, such as the Plymouth Brethren, established churches in the valley.

In the 19th century, the municipality suffered several outbreaks of livestock diseases. To protect the dairy industry, non-local herds were forbidden from passing through the municipality. Cheese was no longer allowed to be carried across the mountains but was now transported on local draft horses. Due to customs taxes with the neighbouring Canton of Fribourg, cheese was carried on a route over the Col de Chaude to Villeneuve (VD) and from there to the shores of Lake Geneva, without crossing the Fribourg border. The abolition of the inter-canton customs and taxes in 1848 led to the demolition of the Fribourg customs station on the main road that had linked Château-d'Œx with the grain and livestock markets. Changes in markets and improvements in animal husbandry led to more Simmental cattle being raised for meat rather than cheese production. The construction of the road over the Col des Mosses (1865–71) and the construction of a new road to Bulle (1895) eased transportation.

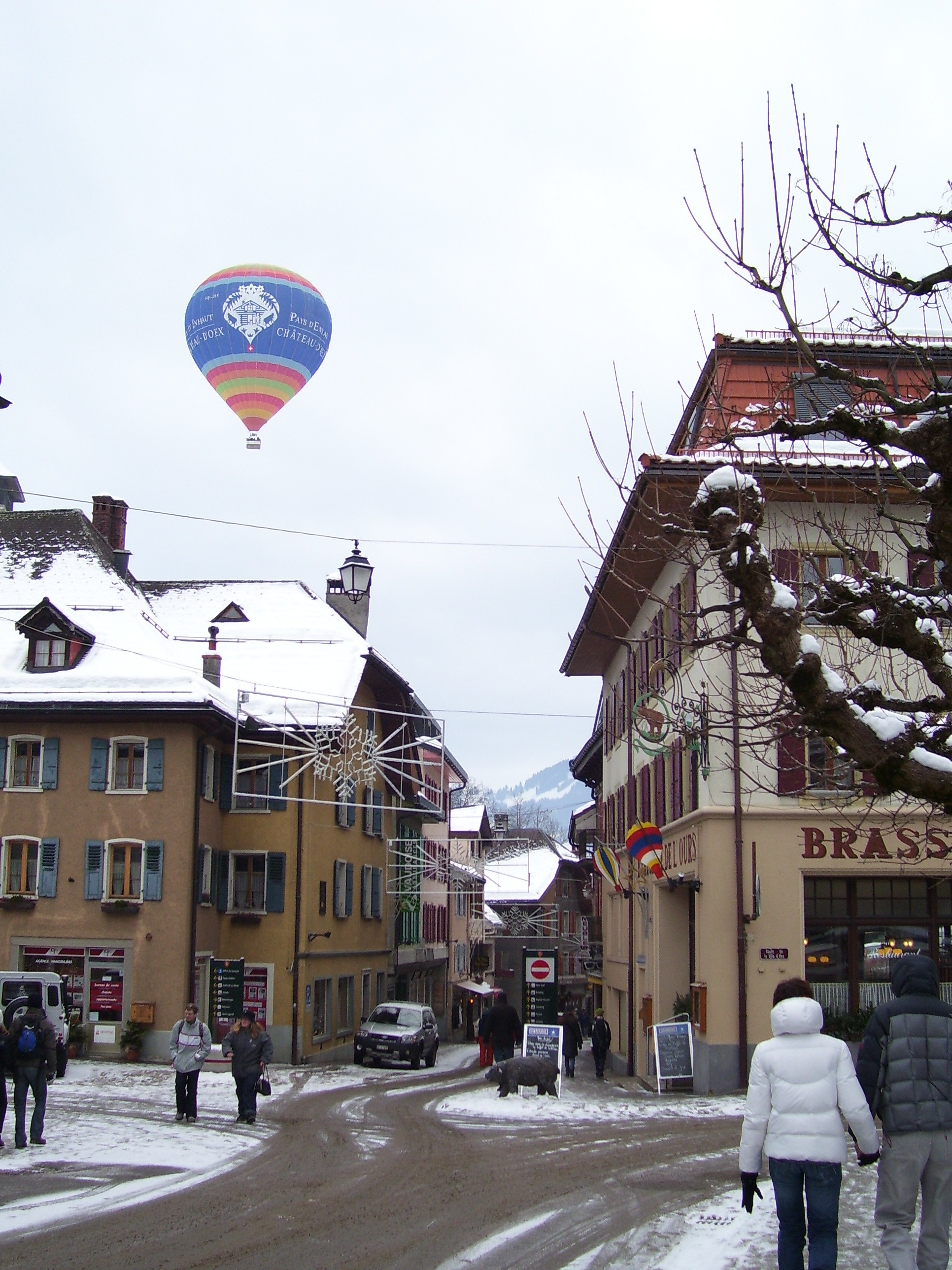
Balloon above the streets of Château-d'Œx

The hospital, which had replaced the old hospital in 1926, was remodelled in 1979 into a nursing home and district hospital. At the same time, solar heating was added to the building. The municipal administration building was built in 1912, and renovated in 1958. The Musée du Vieux Pays-d'Enhaut was built in 1922.

A power plant was operated in La Chaudanne from 1894 until about 1901. The opening of the Montreux–Lenk im Simmental line in 1904 made Château-d'Œx an attractive summer resort. It was particularly appreciated by English tourists. Between 1916 and 1918 it also housed English internees during the war. Half a dozen grand hotels with tennis courts sprang up in the municipality. A tennis club was founded in 1894 and the area has hosted the lawn tennis Swiss International Championships.

Other infrastructure included the suspension bridge at Turrian (1883), a swimming pool and a campsite (1932), a cable car (1945) and the Pont du Berceau (1945). The agricultural sector has remained important, with the emphasis again shifting to cheese. In the 20th century, winter tourism became an important additional source of income. Hot air balloons and river rafting became common in the summer, while local crafts, sawmills and gravel mining are the main branches of the industrial sector. Since 1945, the area around Pierreuse has been a protected heritage site.

=== World War I internment ===
During World War I Switzerland accepted 68,000 sick or injured prisoners of war from both sides of the conflict. These prisoners required medical care that they could not receive in internment camps due to a demand for doctors at the front to care for their own nation's injured. Following an agreement between the belligerent nations and with support from the Red Cross the internees were transferred to neutral Switzerland. The first trainload of injured soldiers arrived to cheering crowds at Château-d'Œx on 30 May 1916. The British ambassador to Switzerland, Sir Evelyn Grant Duff, met the first train and recorded in his diary that evening:

It is difficult to write calmly about it for the simple reason that I have never before in my life seen such a welcome accorded to anyone, although for 28 years I have been present at every kind of function in half the capitals of Europe. At Lausanne some 10,000 people, at 5am, were present at the station. Our men were simply astounded. Many of them were crying like children, a few fainted from emotion. As one private said to me: "God bless you, sir, it's like dropping right into 'eaven from 'ell."

— Sir Evelyn Grant Duff,

Château-d'Œx was the first community chosen to host the injured prisoners because its letter offering to help was the first one received by the Swiss government. Over the following two years many resort communities, devastated as tourism vanished during the war, experienced growth as internees were housed in empty resorts and as their loved ones visited.

=== Escher ===
In 1935, the Dutch painter M.C. Escher and his wife Jutta decided to leave Italy, where they had lived for many years after their nine-year-old son was forced to join the Fascist Balilla Youth Movement. They found refuge in Switzerland and lived for two years in Château-d'Œx.

=== Bank for International Settlements ===
In the second half of May 1940, the Bank for International Settlements relocated to Château-d'Œx from Basel, out of fear of an imminent German invasion of Switzerland. BIS President Thomas H. McKittrick and economic adviser Per Jacobsson moved into the nearby château of Rougemont, while the rest of the staff found accommodation in the village. The BIS moved back to Basel in October 1940.

== Geography ==
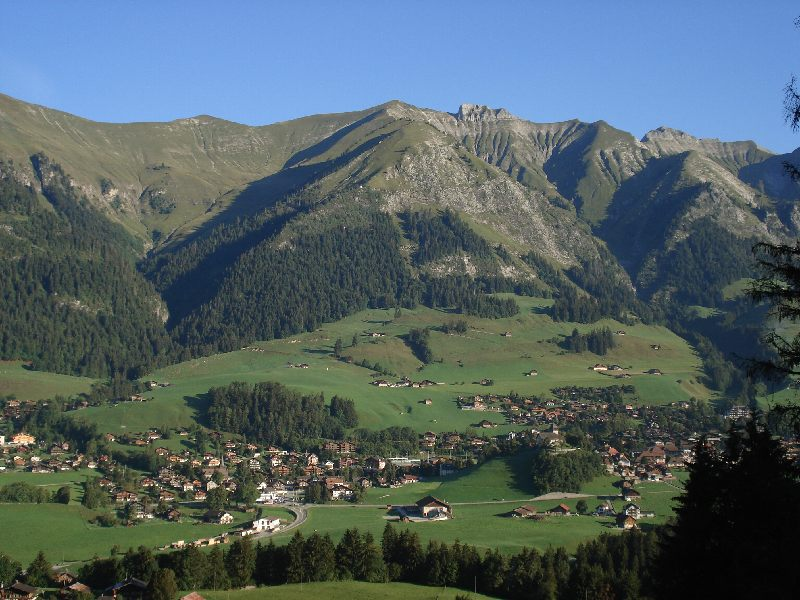
View of Château-d'Œx and the surrounding mountains

Aerial view (1964)

Château-d'Œx has an area, as of 2009, of 113.7 square kilometers (43.9 mi^{2}). Of this area, 50.67 km^{2} (19.56 mi^{2}) or 44.6% is used for agricultural purposes, while 40.8 km^{2} (15.8 mi^{2}) or 35.9% is forested. Of the rest of the land, 3.29 km^{2} (1.27 mi^{2}) or 2.9% is settled (buildings or roads), 1.11 km^{2} (0.43 mi^{2}) or 1.0% is either rivers or lakes and 17.74 km^{2} (6.85 mi^{2}) or 15.6% is unproductive land.

Of the built up area, housing and buildings made up 1.3% and transportation infrastructure made up 1.2%. Out of the forested land, 30.0% of the total land area is heavily forested and 3.8% is covered with orchards or small clusters of trees. Of the agricultural land, 0.1% is used for growing crops and 10.5% is pastures and 34.0% is used for alpine pastures. Of the water in the municipality, 0.4% is in lakes and 0.6% is in rivers and streams. Of the unproductive areas, 9.3% is unproductive vegetation and 6.3% is too rocky for vegetation.

The municipality was part of the Pays-d'Enhaut District until it was dissolved on 31 August 2006, and Château-d'Œx became part of the new district of Riviera-Pays-d'Enhaut.

The municipality is the largest in land area in the canton. It is located in the upper Saane valley. In the 14th to 18th Centuries, the seven établées of Sous le Scex, Mont, Village, Frasse, Entre deux Eaux, Monteiller and L'Étivaz merged into the municipality. It consists of the villages of Château-d'Œx, L'Étivaz, Les Moulins and Les Granges, 35 hamlets and 22 alpine herding camps.

=== Climate ===
Climate data for Château-d'Œx, elevation 1,028 m (3,373 ft), (1991–2020)
Month	Jan	Feb	Mar	Apr	May	Jun	Jul	Aug	Sep	Oct	Nov	Dec	Year
Mean daily maximum °C (°F)	2.5 (36.5)	4.1 (39.4)	8.5 (47.3)	12.4 (54.3)	16.4 (61.5)	20.1 (68.2)	22.2 (72.0)	21.9 (71.4)	17.5 (63.5)	13.2 (55.8)	7.1 (44.8)	3.2 (37.8)	12.4 (54.3)
Daily mean °C (°F)	−1.9 (28.6)	−1.1 (30.0)	2.7 (36.9)	6.4 (43.5)	10.5 (50.9)	14.0 (57.2)	15.7 (60.3)	15.3 (59.5)	11.5 (52.7)	7.6 (45.7)	2.3 (36.1)	−1.1 (30.0)	6.8 (44.2)
Mean daily minimum °C (°F)	−5.7 (21.7)	−5.5 (22.1)	−2.1 (28.2)	0.8 (33.4)	5.0 (41.0)	8.4 (47.1)	10.2 (50.4)	10.0 (50.0)	6.7 (44.1)	3.4 (38.1)	−1.2 (29.8)	−4.4 (24.1)	2.1 (35.8)
Average precipitation mm (inches)	95.0 (3.74)	77.2 (3.04)	86.0 (3.39)	84.0 (3.31)	128.9 (5.07)	127.7 (5.03)	145.1 (5.71)	146.7 (5.78)	101.7 (4.00)	96.9 (3.81)	97.3 (3.83)	115.2 (4.54)	1,301.7 (51.25)
Average snowfall cm (inches)	47.3 (18.6)	50.2 (19.8)	28.1 (11.1)	15.0 (5.9)	1.1 (0.4)	0.0 (0.0)	0.0 (0.0)	0.0 (0.0)	0.0 (0.0)	2.0 (0.8)	23.8 (9.4)	47.4 (18.7)	214.9 (84.6)
Average precipitation days (≥ 1.0 mm)	10.6	9.4	10.5	10.7	13.3	13.0	12.3	12.1	10.1	10.3	10.6	11.7	134.6
Average snowy days (≥ 1.0 cm)	6.2	6.0	4.1	2.0	0.3	0.0	0.0	0.0	0.0	0.5	3.6	6.1	28.8
Average relative humidity (%)	81	78	75	73	75	74	73	75	79	81	83	83	78
Source 1: NOAA
Source 2: MeteoSwiss

== Coat of arms ==
The blazon of the municipal coat of arms is Gules, a tower embattled Or, a wall embattled of the same in the dexter, surmounted by a crane Argent.

== Demographics ==
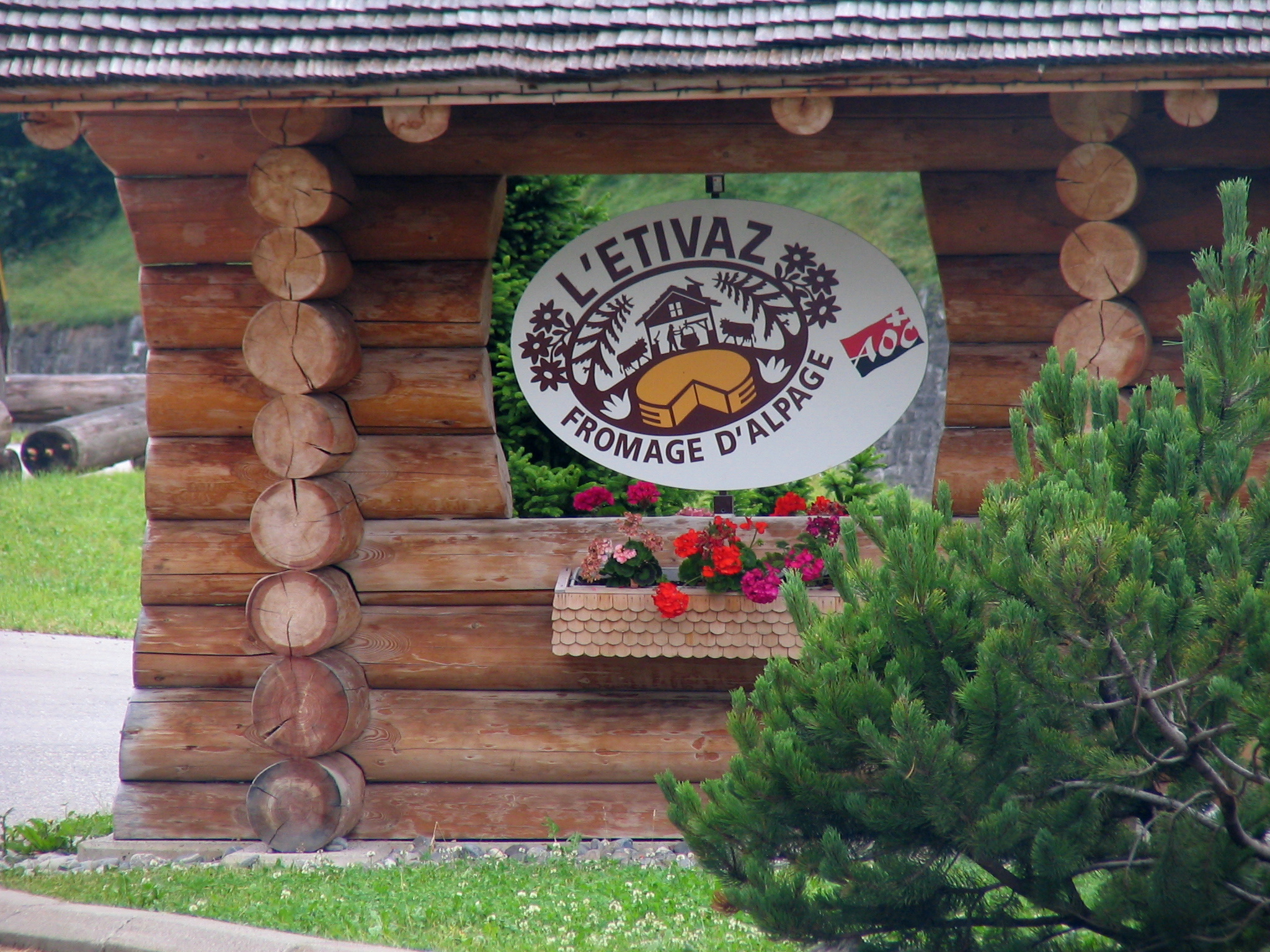
L'Étivaz village

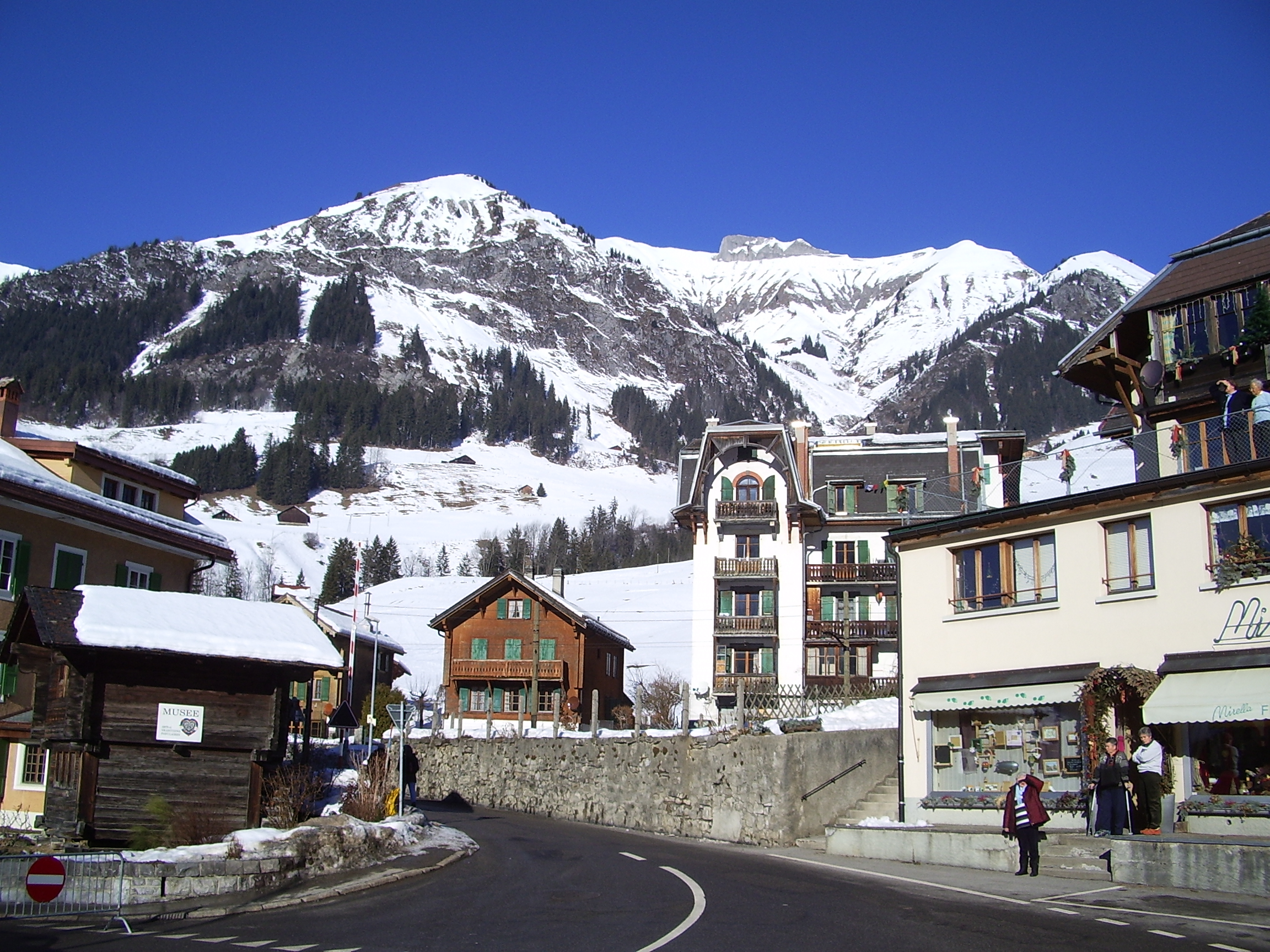
Château-d'Œx

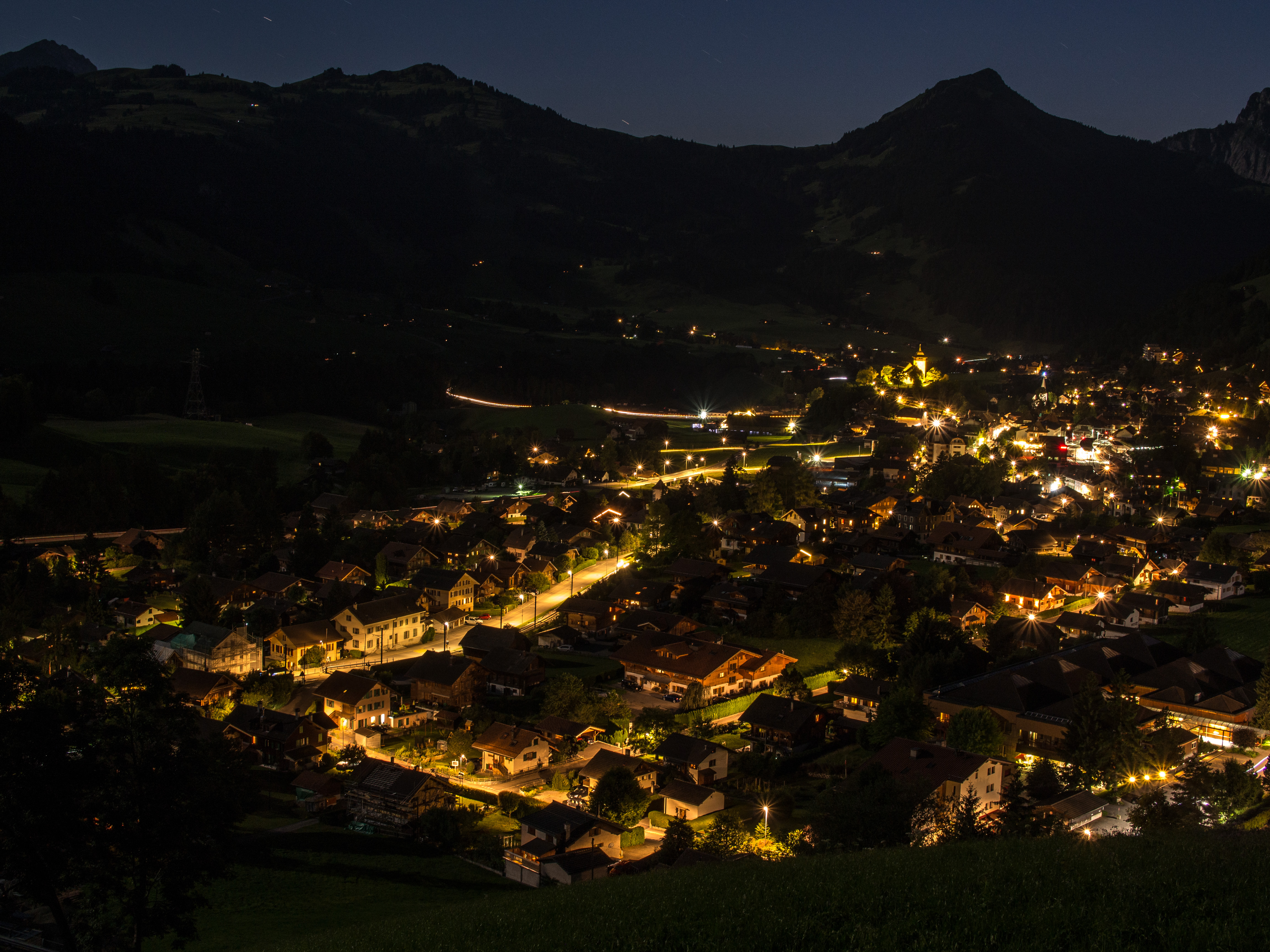
Château-d'Œx at night

Château-d'Œx has a population (as of December 2020) of 3,487. As of 2008, 19.1% of the population are resident foreign nationals. Over the last 10 years (1999–2009) the population has changed at a rate of 5%. It has changed at a rate of 8.8% due to migration and at a rate of −3.6% due to births and deaths.

Most of the population (as of 2000) speaks French (2,611 or 88.5%), with German being second most common (105 or 3.6%) and English being third (71 or 2.4%). There are 19 people who speak Italian.

The age distribution of the population (as of 2000) is children and teenagers (0–19 years old) make up 23.9% of the population, while adults (20–64 years old) make up 54.6% and seniors (over 64 years old) make up 21.5%.

As of 2000, there were 1,140 people who were single and never married in the municipality. There were 1,422 married individuals, 227 widows or widowers and 160 individuals who are divorced.

As of 2000, there were 1,350 private households in the municipality and an average of 2.1 persons per household. There were 550 households that consist of only one person and 92 households with five or more people. Out of a total of 1,381 households that answered this question, 39.8% were households made up of just one person and there were 11 adults who lived with their parents. Of the rest of the households, there are 363 married couples without children, 340 married couples with children. There were 66 single parents with a child or children. There were 20 households that were made up of unrelated people and 31 households that were made up of some sort of institution or another collective housing.

In 2000 there were 608 single-family homes (or 47.8% of the total) out of a total of 1,271 inhabited buildings. There were 342 multi-family buildings (26.9%), along with 217 multi-purpose buildings that were mostly used for housing (17.1%) and 104 other use buildings (commercial or industrial) that also had some housing (8.2%).

In 2000, a total of 1,302 apartments (57.5% of the total) were permanently occupied, while 871 apartments (38.5%) were seasonally occupied and 90 apartments (4.0%) were empty. As of 2009, the construction rate of new housing units was 6.6 new units per 1000 residents. The vacancy rate for the municipality, in 2010, was 1.54%.

The historical population is given in the following chart:

== Notable people ==
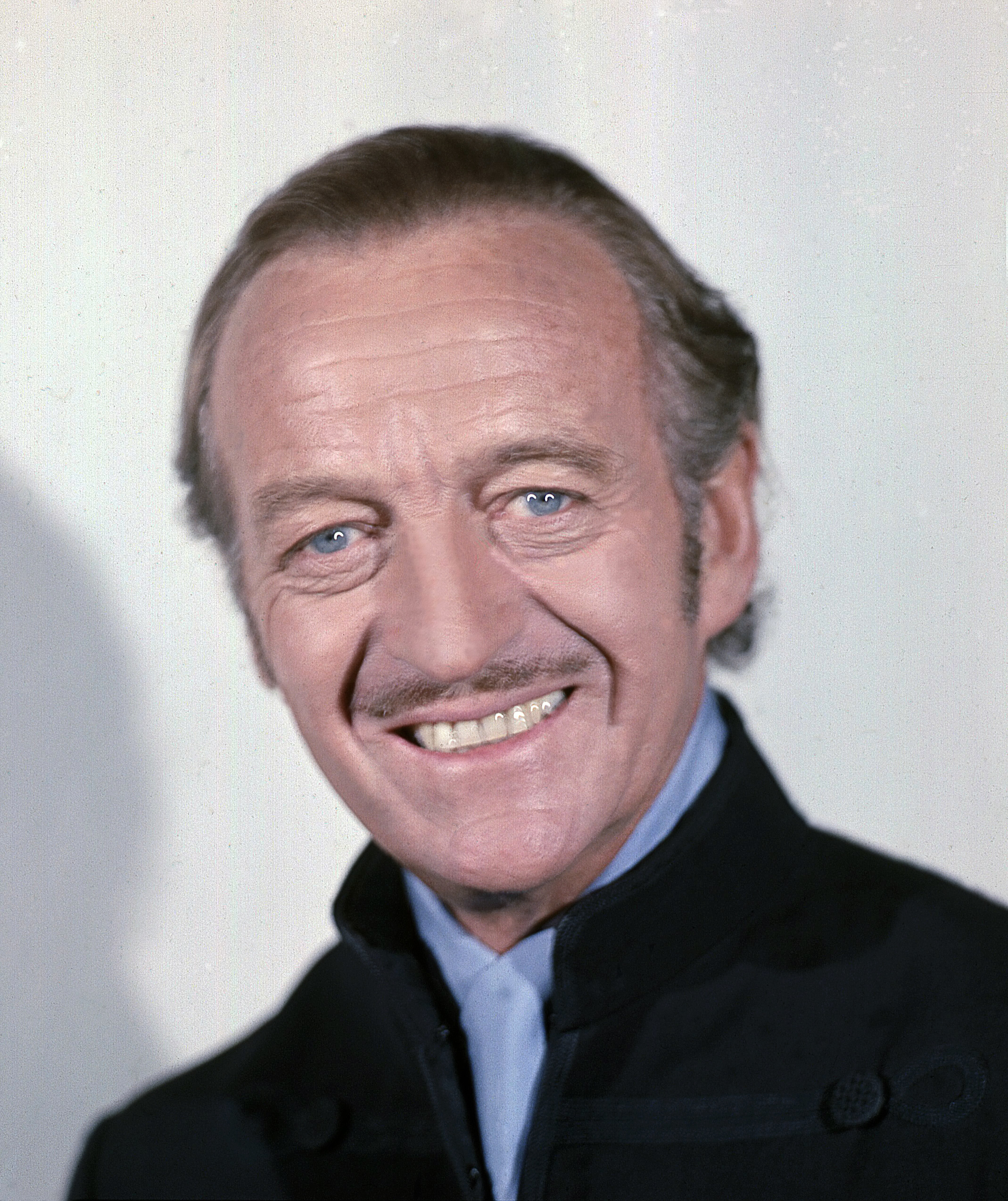
David Niven, 1973

- M. C. Escher (1898–1972), a Dutch graphic artist of woodcuts, lithographs and mezzotints; lived in Château d'Œx 1935–1937
- Kitty Muggeridge (1903 in Château d'Œx–1994), a British writer and translator
- David Niven (1910–1983 in Château d'Œx), an English actor, memoirist and novelist, lived in Château d'Œx from 1960
- George Rudolf Hanbury Fielding (1915–2005 in Château d'Œx), a Major in the SOE in WWII; brought up in Château d'Œx and lived there again in his later years
- Françoise Roch-Ramel (1931 in Château d'Œx–2001), a Swiss pharmacologist
- Mike Horn (born 1966) a South African-born professional explorer and adventurer, lives in Château d'Œx

=== Sport ===
- Bruno Leuzinger (1886 in Château d'Œx – 1952), a Swiss ice hockey player, competed in the 1920 Summer Olympics and the 1924 Winter Olympics
- Madeleine Berthod (born 1931 in Château d'Œx), a Swiss former alpine skier, gold medallist at the 1956 Winter Olympics
- René Berthod (born 1948 in Château d'Œx), a retired Swiss alpine skier, competed in the 1976 Winter Olympics
- Edmond Plawczyk (born 1971), a Swiss speed snowboarder, lives in Château d'Œx

== Heritage sites of national significance ==
Les Ciernes-Picat, a Mesolithic shelter, is listed as a Swiss heritage site of national significance. The entire village of L'Étivaz is part of the Inventory of Swiss Heritage Sites.

== Sights ==
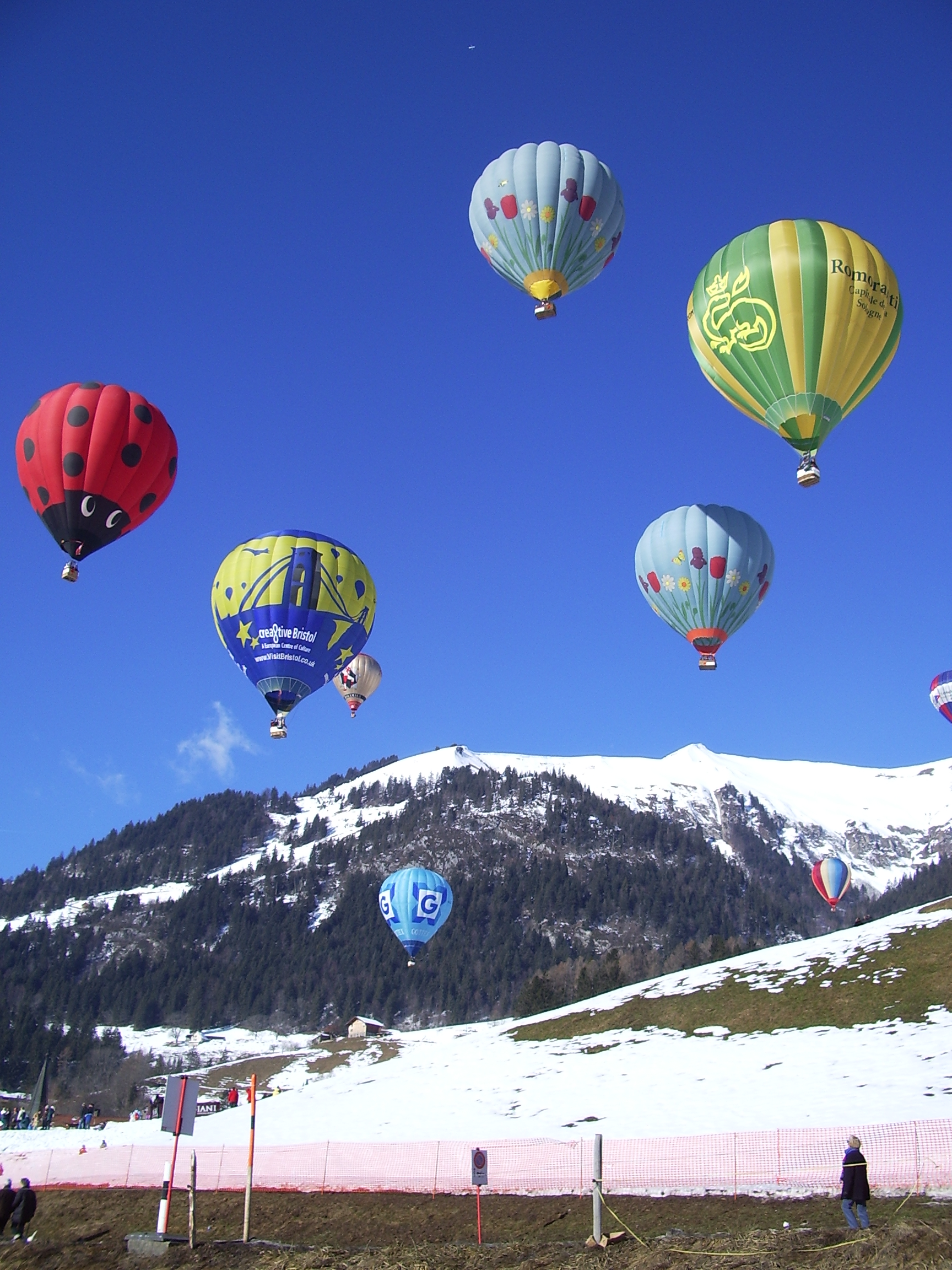
Balloon festival

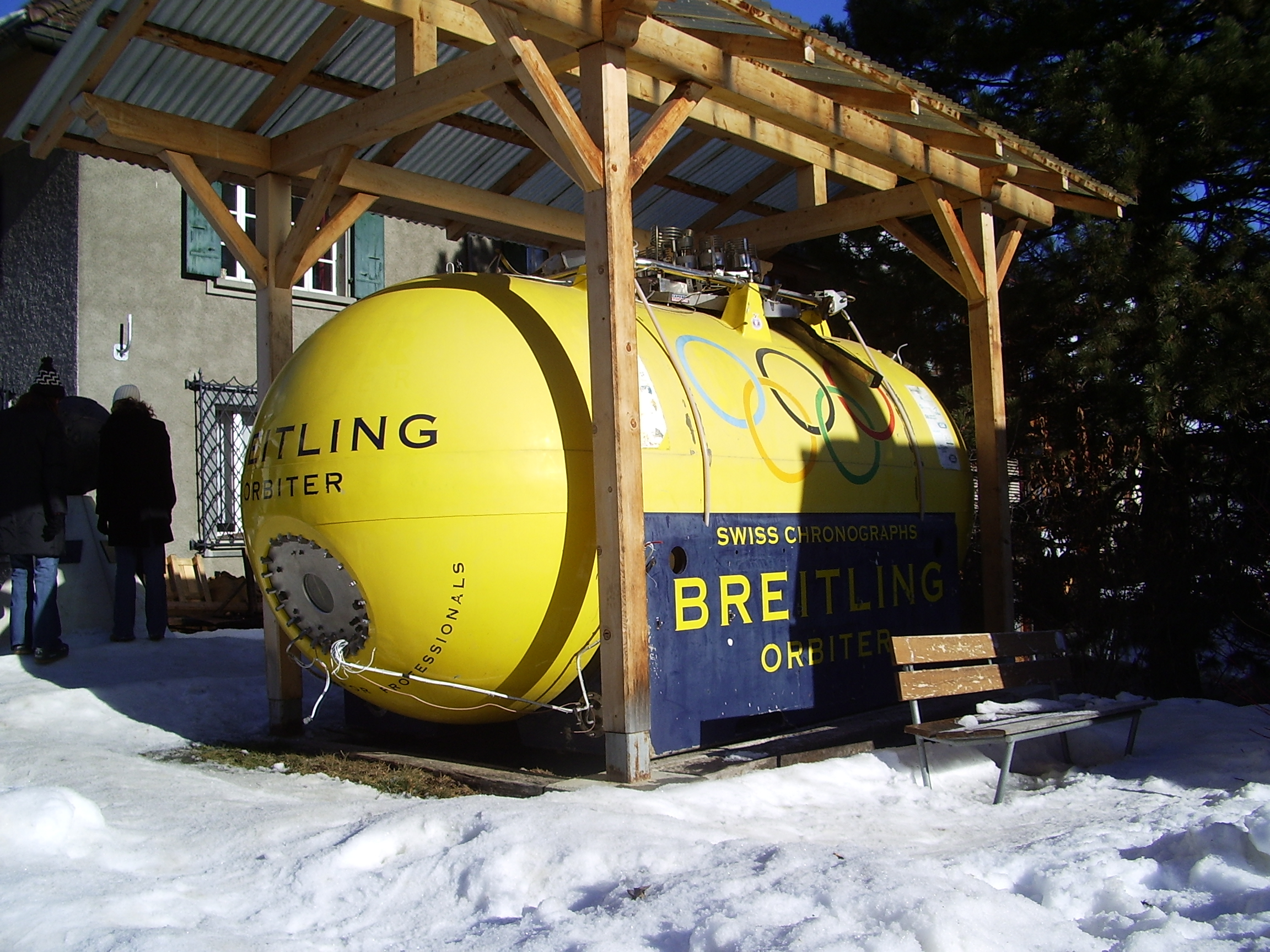
Breitling Orbiter

The International Hot-Air Balloon Festival has been held each year since 1979 in January. Up to 100 balloonists gather for the festival each year. The Breitling Orbiter 3, the first hot air balloon to circumnavigate the Earth, took off from Château-d'Œx on 1 March 1999.

A museum dedicated to Montgolfier type balloons is located in the centre of the town.

== Music Festival ==
The popular annual Le Bois qui Chante music festival is held every year in the month of October.

== Politics ==
In the 2007 federal election the most popular party was the SVP which received 32.23% of the vote. The next three most popular parties were the FDP (18.37%), the SP (16.21%) and the LPS Party (14.68%). In the federal election, a total of 854 votes were cast, and the voter turnout was 41.6%.

== Economy ==
As of 2010, Château-d'Œx had an unemployment rate of 2.3%. As of 2008, there were 234 people employed in the primary economic sector and about 97 businesses involved in this sector. 252 people were employed in the secondary sector and there were 54 businesses in this sector. 1,012 people were employed in the tertiary sector, with 173 businesses in this sector. There were 1,372 residents of the municipality who were employed in some capacity, of which females made up 43.5% of the workforce.

In 2008 the total number of full-time equivalent jobs was 1,196. The number of jobs in the primary sector was 169, all of which were in agriculture. The number of jobs in the secondary sector was 232 of which 60 or (25.9%) were in manufacturing and 156 (67.2%) were in construction. The number of jobs in the tertiary sector was 795. In the tertiary sector; 191 or 24.0% were in wholesale or retail sales or the repair of motor vehicles, 50 or 6.3% were in the movement and storage of goods, 116 or 14.6% were in a hotel or restaurant, 15 or 1.9% were the insurance or financial industry, 46 or 5.8% were technical professionals or scientists, 42 or 5.3% were in education and 198 or 24.9% were in health care.

In 2000, there were 238 workers who commuted into the municipality and 266 workers who commuted away. The municipality is a net exporter of workers, with about 1.1 workers leaving the municipality for every one entering. Of the working population, 5.5% used public transportation to get to work, and 53.3% used a private car.

== Religion ==
From the 2000 census, 527 or 17.9% were Roman Catholic, while 1,746 or 59.2% belonged to the Swiss Reformed Church. Of the rest of the population, there were 12 members of an Orthodox church (or about 0.41% of the population), there was 1 individual who belonged to the Christian Catholic Church, and there were 363 individuals (or about 12.31% of the population) who belonged to another Christian church. There were 9 individuals (or about 0.31% of the population) who were Jewish, and 89 (or about 3.02% of the population) who were Muslim. There were 2 individuals who were Buddhist and 9 individuals who were Hindu. 258 (or about 8.75% of the population) belonged to no church, are agnostic or atheist, and 110 individuals (or about 3.73% of the population) did not answer the question.

== Education ==
In Château-d'Œx about 986 or (33.4%) of the population have completed non-mandatory upper secondary education, and 299 or (10.1%) have completed additional higher education (either university or a Fachhochschule). Of the 299 who completed tertiary schooling, 45.5% were Swiss men, 30.4% were Swiss women, 13.0% were non-Swiss men and 11.0% were non-Swiss women.

As of 2000, there were 92 students in Château-d'Œx who came from another municipality, while 95 residents attended schools outside the municipality.

== Sport ==
Skiing is a key activity in the area, with the town of Château-d'Œx being close to the ski-resort of Gstaad. Château-d'Œx used to be a ski resort in its own right, with a cable car connecting to La Braye ski area (which had 28.5 km of slopes and a top elevation of 1630 m), however the La Braye ski area was closed in 2017 owing to financial difficulties.

In 1922 and 1924, the Hockey Club Château d'Œx was the Swiss champion in its ranks with a local international player in the person of Edouard Mottier who participated in the 1924 Olympic Games in Chamonix.

In 1997, the Mountain Bike World Championships were held in Château d'Œx.

On 1 March 1999, Bertrand Piccard and Brian Jones took off from Château d'Œx and made the first non-stop around the world with a Rozière balloon, landing 21 March in Egypt after 20 days and 40,815 km (25,361 mi).
