= Col des Mosses =

Mountain pass in Switzerland

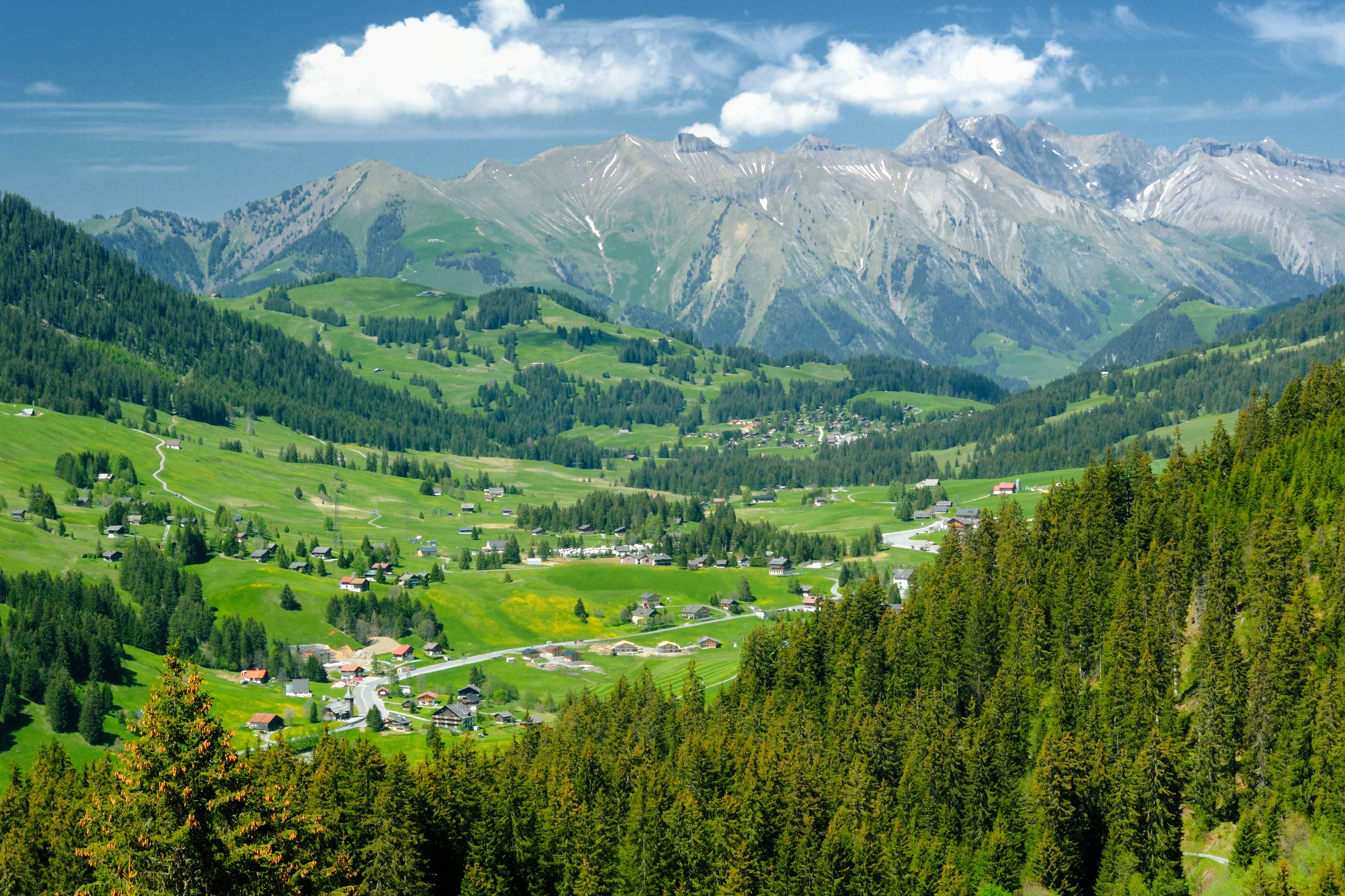
- Looking north across the Col from Oudiou towards the Fribourg Prealps

- Location within Switzerland
- Elevation: 1,445 metres (4,741 ft)<
- Traversed by: Road

Third Approach
- Location: Vaud, Switzerland
- Range: Alps
- Coordinates: 46°24′11.46″N 07°06′8.34″E

Col des Mosses (elevation 1445 m) is a mountain pass in the western Bernese Alps of Switzerland. The pass is located in the municipality of Ormont-Dessous in the canton of Vaud. It links Aigle, to the south in the valley of the Rhone, with Château-d'Œx, to the north in the valley of the Sarine, and is flanked to the west by the Mont d'Or and to the east by the Pic Chaussy.

== Road and public transports ==
The pass is traversed by a major road between Aigle and Château-d'Œx. From Aigle, the road ascends 1,028 metres (3,373 ft) over a distance of 18.8 kilometres (11.7 mi), whilst from Château-d'Œx it ascends 521 metres (1,709 ft) over 14 kilometres (8.7 mi). The road is normally kept open throughout the year. Swiss Post buses services cross the pass several times a day, connecting Château-d'Œx, which is on the Montreux–Oberland Bernois railway, and Le Sépey, on the Aigle–Sépey–Diablerets railway.

== Sports ==
The Col des Mosses is also on the Alpine Pass Route hiking trail, and is a winter sports centre. The Tour de France has crossed the Col des Mosses on five occasions (in 1949, 1997, 2000, 2009 and 2016). The Tour de Romandie has crossed the col three times (in 2008, 2012 and 2013), and the Tour de Suisse just once (in 2010).

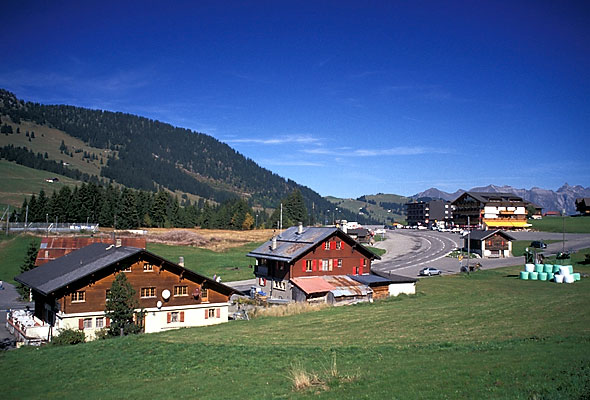
The summit of the pass in summer

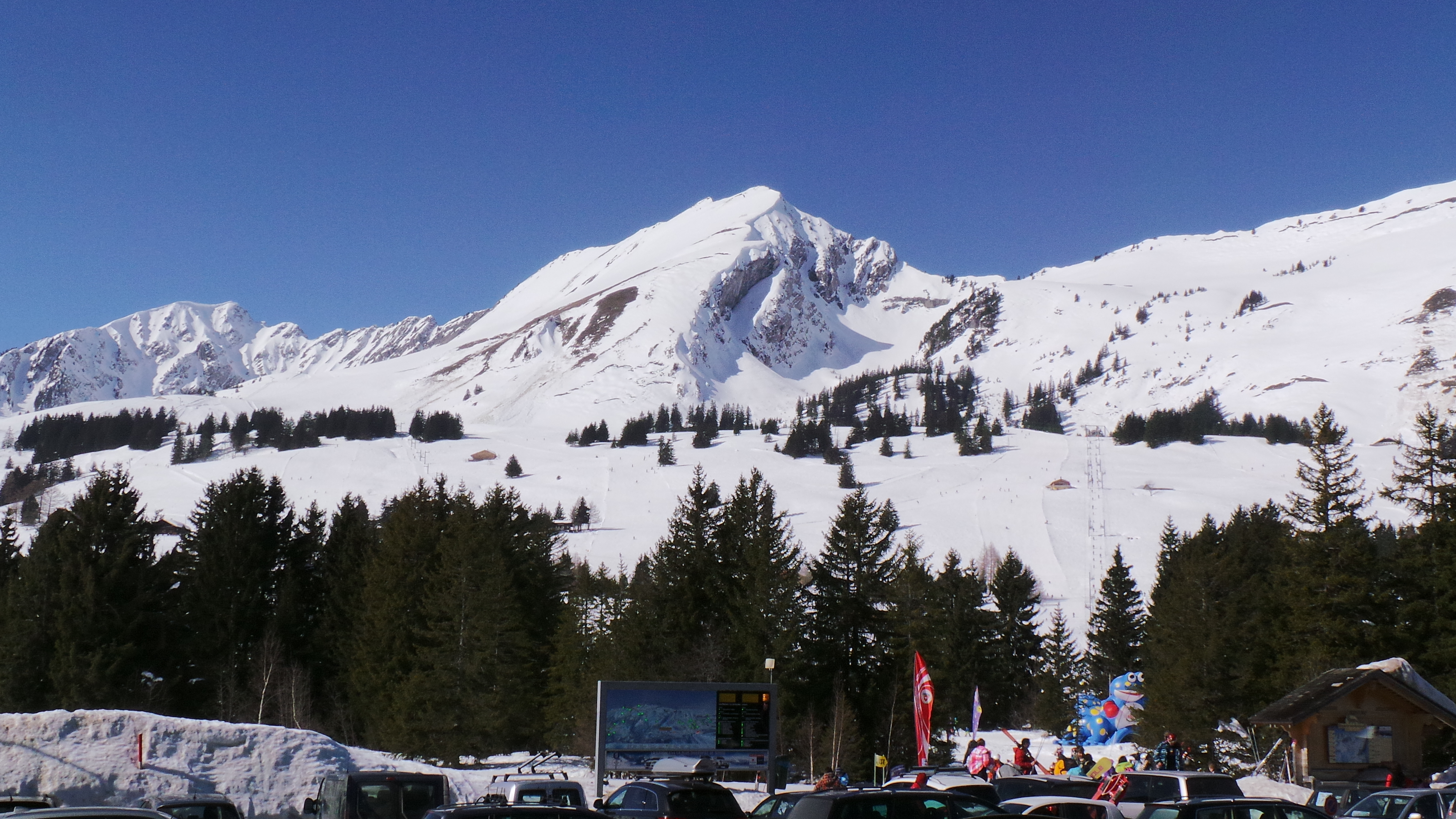
The pass in winter

== See also ==
- List of highest paved roads in Europe
- List of mountain passes
- List of the highest Swiss passes
- Lac Lioson
