= Lac de l'Hongrin =

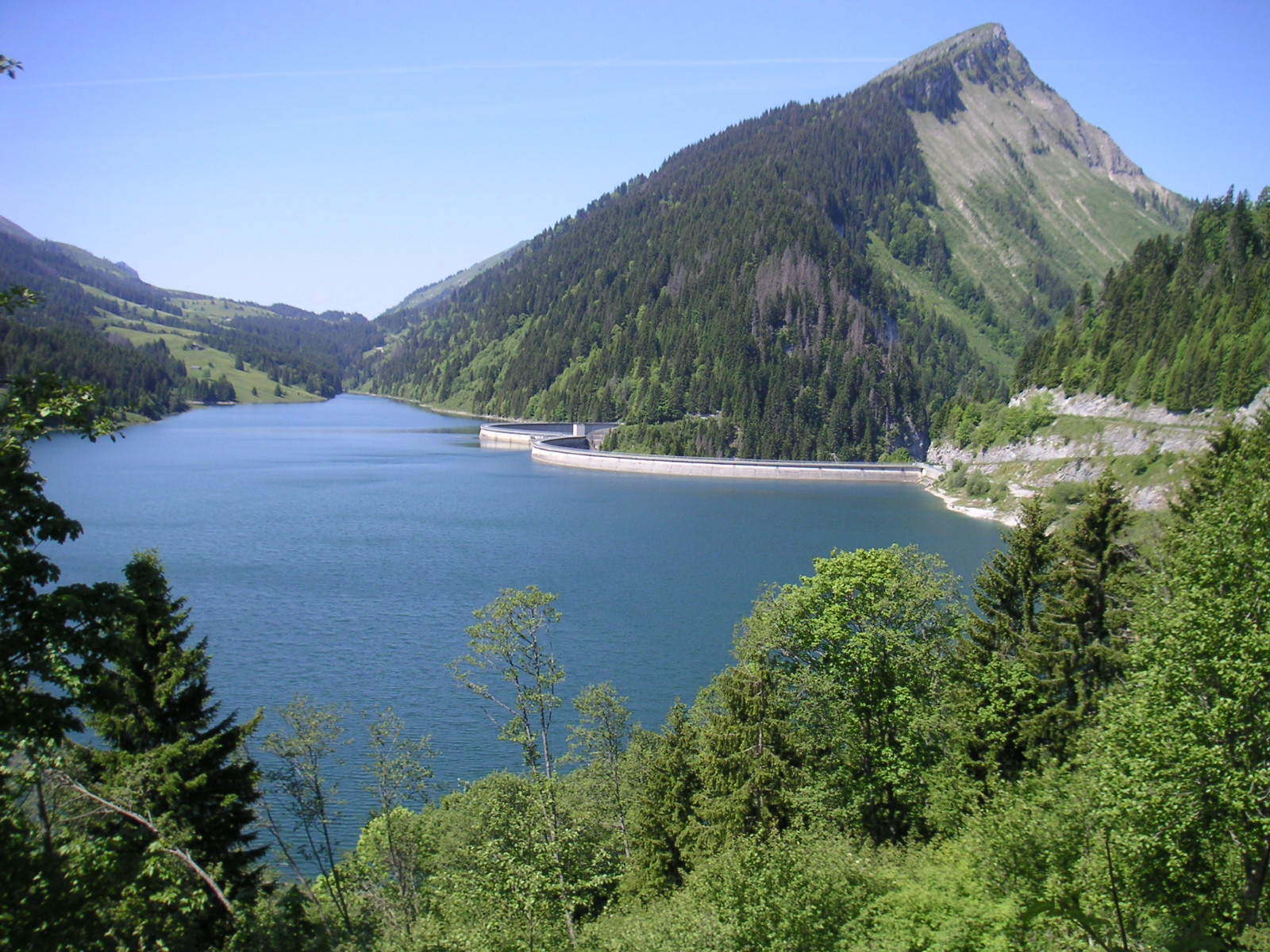

- Location within Canton of Vaud Location within Switzerland Location within Alps
- Interactive map of Lac de l'Hongrin
- Location: Vaud
- Coordinates: 46°25′29″N 7°2′54″E
- Type: reservoir
- Primary inflows: Hongrin
- Primary outflows: Hongrin
- Catchment area: 45.6 km^{2} (17.6 sq mi)
- Basin countries: Switzerland
- Surface area: 1.60 km^{2} (0.62 sq mi)
- Max. depth: 105 m (344 ft)
- Surface elevation: 1,255 m (4,117 ft)

Lac de l'Hongrin is a reservoir in Vaud, Switzerland. The reservoir with a surface area of 1.60 km^{2} (0.62 sq mi) is located in the municipalities of Château-d'Œx and Ormont-Dessous. The two arch dams Hongrin Nord and Hongrin Sud were completed in 1969. The Dam helps with hydro electricity, and stops flooding in the area.

The water of the Hongrin reservoir is used for the Veytaux Pumped Storage Power Station. This power station has currently a nameplate capacity of 240 megawatts. Additional turbines which will double capacity to 480 MW will be commissioned by end of 2015.

== See also ==
- List of lakes of Switzerland
- List of mountain lakes of Switzerland
