= Ormont-Dessous =

- Municipality
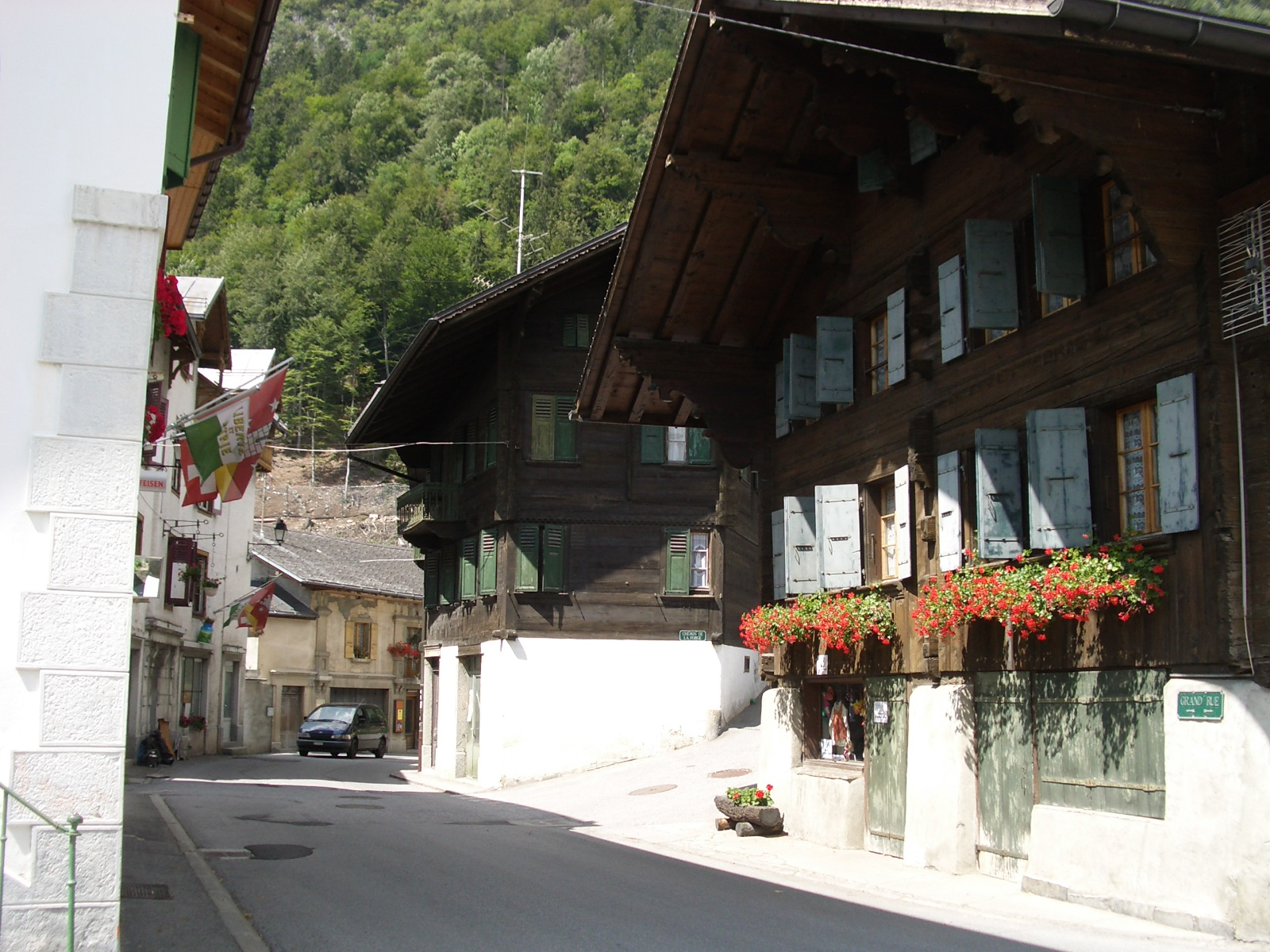
- Le Sépey village

- Flag Coat of arms
- Location of Ormont-Dessous
- Location within Switzerland Location within Canton of Vaud
- Coordinates: 46°22′N 7°03′E
- Country: Switzerland
- Canton: Vaud
- District: Aigle

Government
  - Mayor: Syndic

Area
  - Total: 64.07 km^{2} (24.74 sq mi)
- Elevation: 705 m (2,313 ft)

Population (2000)
  - Total: 979
  - Density: 15.3/km^{2} (39.6/sq mi)
- Demonym: Les Ormonans
- Time zone: UTC+01:00 (CET)
  - Summer (DST): UTC+02:00 (CEST)
- Postal code: 1863
- SFOS number: 5410
- ISO 3166 code: CH-VD
- Localities: Cergnat, La Comballaz, Les Mosses, La Forclaz (Ormont-Dessous)
- Surrounded by: Château-d'Œx, Ormont-Dessus, Ollon, Aigle, Leysin, Corbeyrier, Villeneuve (VD)
- Website: ormont-dessous.ch

Ormont-Dessous is a municipality of the canton of Vaud in Switzerland, located in the district of Aigle.

== History ==
Ormont-Dessous is first mentioned in 1200 as Ormont. In 1564 it was mentioned as Bas-Ormont. The German name Ormund is no longer used.

== Geography ==
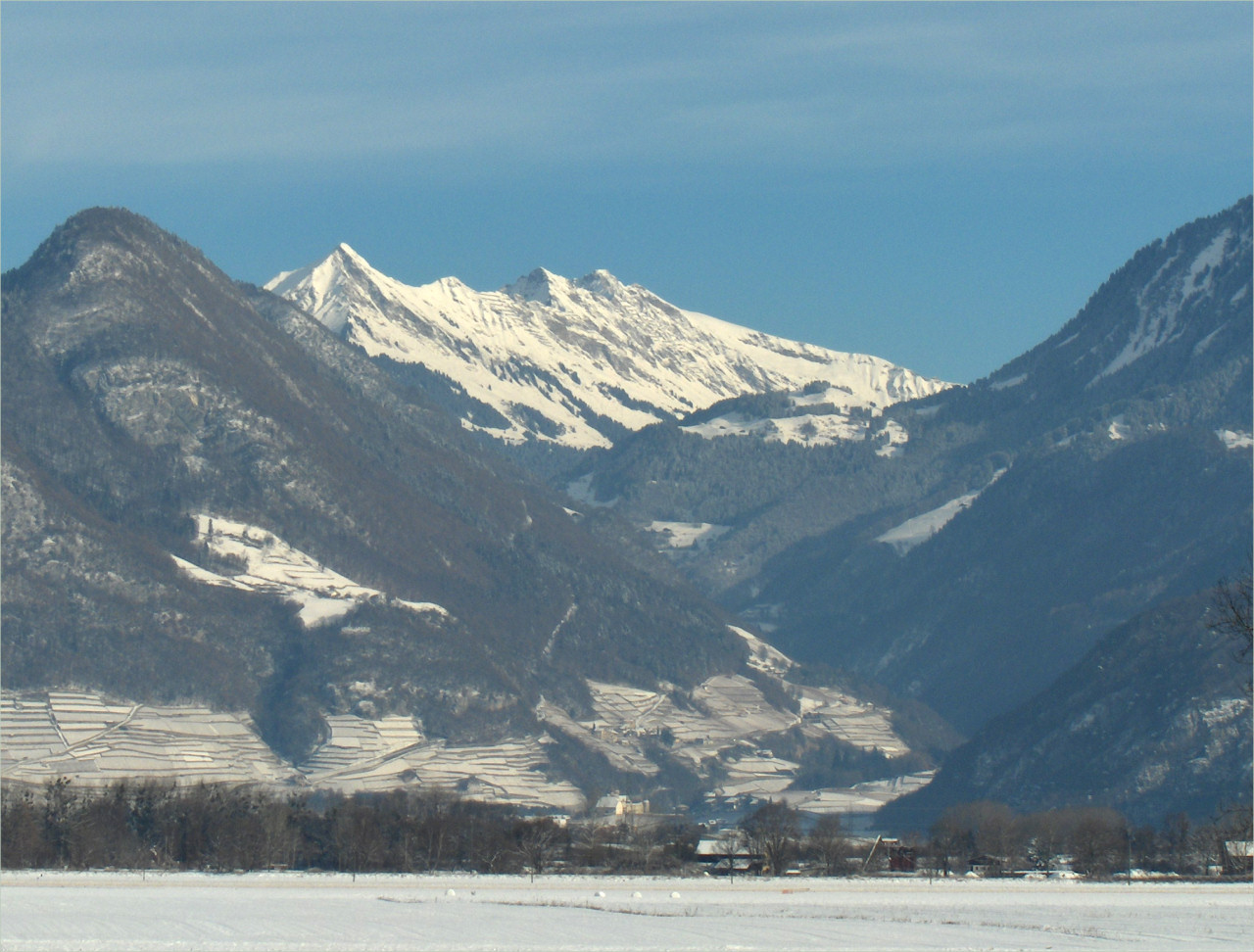
Ormont-Dessous/Dessus seen from Valais

Aerial view by Walter Mittelholzer (1919)

Ormont-Dessous has an area, as of 2009, of 64.07 square kilometers (24.74 sq mi). Of this area, 24.93 km^{2} (9.63 sq mi) or 38.9% is used for agricultural purposes, while 29.07 km^{2} (11.22 sq mi) or 45.4% is forested. Of the rest of the land, 2.05 km^{2} (0.79 sq mi) or 3.2% is settled (buildings or roads), 1.26 km^{2} (0.49 sq mi) or 2.0% is either rivers or lakes and 6.71 km^{2} (2.59 sq mi) or 10.5% is unproductive land.

Of the built up area, housing and buildings made up 1.3% and transportation infrastructure made up 1.7%. Out of the forested land, 37.8% of the total land area is heavily forested and 4.8% is covered with orchards or small clusters of trees. Of the agricultural land, 0.0% is used for growing crops and 10.6% is pastures and 28.3% is used for alpine pastures. Of the water in the municipality, 1.8% is in lakes and 0.2% is in rivers and streams. Of the unproductive areas, 7.2% is unproductive vegetation and 3.2% is too rocky for vegetation.

The municipality is located in the Aigle district, in the middle of the Grande-Eau valley. It consists of the villages of Le Sépey and La Forclaz as well as scattered settlements at Cergnat, Matélon, La Comballaz and Les Voëttes.

== Coat of arms ==
The blazon of the municipal coat of arms is Gules, from three Hills Or rising a Tower Argent masoned and windowed Sable between four, two and two, Mullets of Five Argent. This coat of arms might be an example of canting with Ormont-Dessous being read as Or-Mont-Dessous or Gold(en)-Mount-Below.

== Demographics ==
Ormont-Dessous has a population (as of December 2020) of 1,182. As of 2008, 9.6% of the population are resident foreign nationals. Over the last 10 years (1999–2009) the population has changed at a rate of 3.4%. It has changed at a rate of 9.2% due to migration and at a rate of -5.5% due to births and deaths.

Most of the population (as of 2000) speaks French (1,000 or 93.0%), with German being second most common (33 or 3.1%) and Portuguese being third (16 or 1.5%). There are 8 people who speak Italian.

Of the population in the municipality 368 or about 34.2% were born in Ormont-Dessous and lived there in 2000. There were 321 or 29.9% who were born in the same canton, while 150 or 14.0% were born somewhere else in Switzerland, and 127 or 11.8% were born outside of Switzerland.

In 2008 there were 10 live births to Swiss citizens and were 20 deaths of Swiss citizens. Ignoring immigration and emigration, the population of Swiss citizens decreased by 10 while the foreign population remained the same. There were 3 Swiss men who immigrated back to Switzerland. At the same time, there was 1 non-Swiss man who immigrated from another country to Switzerland. The total Swiss population change in 2008 (from all sources, including moves across municipal borders) was a decrease of 18 and the non-Swiss population decreased by 16 people. This represents a population growth rate of -3.3%.

The age distribution, as of 2009, in Ormont-Dessous is; 91 children or 9.1% of the population are between 0 and 9 years old and 122 teenagers or 12.2% are between 10 and 19. Of the adult population, 81 people or 8.1% of the population are between 20 and 29 years old. 139 people or 13.8% are between 30 and 39, 139 people or 13.8% are between 40 and 49, and 153 people or 15.2% are between 50 and 59. The senior population distribution is 135 people or 13.4% of the population are between 60 and 69 years old, 70 people or 7.0% are between 70 and 79, there are 58 people or 5.8% who are 80 and 89, and there are 16 people or 1.6% who are 90 and older.

As of 2000, there were 337 people who were single and never married in the municipality. There were 556 married individuals, 93 widows or widowers and 89 individuals who are divorced.

As of 2000, there were 500 private households in the municipality, and an average of 2. persons per household. There were 210 households that consist of only one person and 22 households with five or more people. Out of a total of 531 households that answered this question, 39.5% were households made up of just one person and there were 8 adults who lived with their parents. Of the rest of the households, there are 146 married couples without children, 103 married couples with children. There were 23 single parents with a child or children. There were 10 households that were made up of unrelated people and 31 households that were made up of some sort of institution or another collective housing.

In 2000 there were 701 single family homes (or 66.5% of the total) out of a total of 1,054 inhabited buildings. There were 116 multi-family buildings (11.0%), along with 187 multi-purpose buildings that were mostly used for housing (17.7%) and 50 other use buildings (commercial or industrial) that also had some housing (4.7%). Of the single family homes 419 were built before 1919, while 21 were built between 1990 and 2000. The most multi-family homes (50) were built before 1919 and the next most (23) were built between 1961 and 1970. There were 2 multi-family houses built between 1996 and 2000.

In 2000 there were 1,444 apartments in the municipality. The most common apartment size was 3 rooms of which there were 359. There were 114 single room apartments and 435 apartments with five or more rooms. Of these apartments, a total of 483 apartments (33.4% of the total) were permanently occupied, while 842 apartments (58.3%) were seasonally occupied and 119 apartments (8.2%) were empty. As of 2009, the construction rate of new housing units was 0 new units per 1000 residents. The vacancy rate for the municipality, in 2010, was 0%.

The historical population is given in the following chart:

== Heritage sites of national significance ==
The Pont des Planches is listed as Swiss heritage site of national significance. The entire village of La Forclaz is part of the Inventory of Swiss Heritage Sites.

== Politics ==
In the 2007 federal election the most popular party was the SVP which received 35.26% of the vote. The next three most popular parties were the FDP (19.63%), the SP (13.52%) and the Green Party (9.71%). In the federal election, a total of 263 votes were cast, and the voter turnout was 33.6%.

== Economy ==
As of 2010, Ormont-Dessous had an unemployment rate of 3.6%. As of 2008, there were 104 people employed in the primary economic sector and about 42 businesses involved in this sector. 51 people were employed in the secondary sector and there were 17 businesses in this sector. 172 people were employed in the tertiary sector, with 39 businesses in this sector. There were 468 residents of the municipality who were employed in some capacity, of which females made up 38.2% of the workforce.

In 2008 the total number of full-time equivalent jobs was 239. The number of jobs in the primary sector was 60, all of which were in agriculture. The number of jobs in the secondary sector was 46 of which 8 or (17.4%) were in manufacturing and 37 (80.4%) were in construction. The number of jobs in the tertiary sector was 133. In the tertiary sector; 22 or 16.5% were in wholesale or retail sales or the repair of motor vehicles, 10 or 7.5% were in the movement and storage of goods, 40 or 30.1% were in a hotel or restaurant, 1 was the insurance or financial industry, 27 or 20.3% were in education and 18 or 13.5% were in health care.

In 2000, there were 47 workers who commuted into the municipality and 233 workers who commuted away. The municipality is a net exporter of workers, with about 5.0 workers leaving the municipality for every one entering. Of the working population, 8.5% used public transportation to get to work, and 61.3% used a private car.

== Religion ==
From the 2000 census, 184 or 17.1% were Roman Catholic, while 658 or 61.2% belonged to the Swiss Reformed Church. Of the rest of the population, there were 11 individuals (or about 1.02% of the population) who belonged to another Christian church. There were 3 (or about 0.28% of the population) who were Islamic. There were 2 individuals who were Buddhist. 103 (or about 9.58% of the population) belonged to no church, are agnostic or atheist, and 114 individuals (or about 10.60% of the population) did not answer the question.

== Education ==
In Ormont-Dessous about 380 or (35.3%) of the population have completed non-mandatory upper secondary education, and 85 or (7.9%) have completed additional higher education (either university or a Fachhochschule). Of the 85 who completed tertiary schooling, 67.1% were Swiss men, 28.2% were Swiss women.

In the 2009/2010 school year there were a total of 115 students in the Ormont-Dessous school district. In the Vaud cantonal school system, two years of non-obligatory pre-school are provided by the political districts. During the school year, the political district provided pre-school care for a total of 205 children of which 96 children (46.8%) received subsidized pre-school care. The canton's primary school program requires students to attend for four years. There were 54 students in the municipal primary school program. The obligatory lower secondary school program lasts for six years and there were 57 students in those schools. There were also 4 students who were home schooled or attended another non-traditional school.

As of 2000, there were 80 students in Ormont-Dessous who came from another municipality, while 46 residents attended schools outside the municipality.
