= Haut-Intyamon =

- Municipality
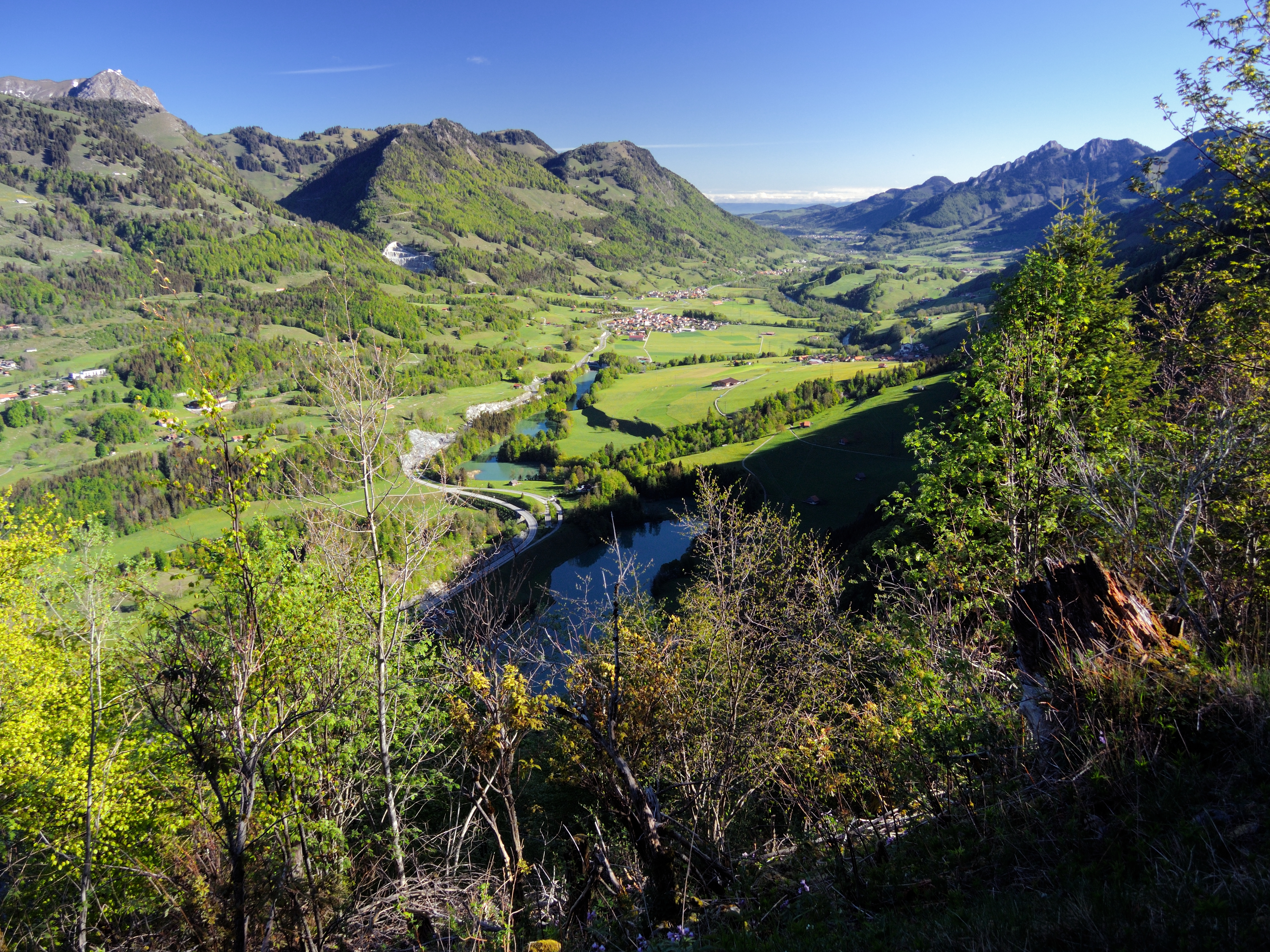
- Intyamon valley from above Montbovon, looking north towards Albeuve and Neirivue

- Coat of arms
- Location of Haut-Intyamon
- Location within Switzerland Location within Canton of Fribourg
- Coordinates: 46°31′N 7°3′E
- Country: Switzerland
- Canton: Fribourg
- District: Gruyère

Government
  - Mayor: Syndic

Area
  - Total: 60.44 km^{2} (23.34 sq mi)
- Elevation: 763 m (2,503 ft)

Population (December 2020)
  - Total: 1,588
  - Density: 26.27/km^{2} (68.05/sq mi)
- Time zone: UTC+01:00 (CET)
  - Summer (DST): UTC+02:00 (CEST)
- Postal code: 1669
- SFOS number: 2121
- ISO 3166 code: CH-FR
- Localities: Albeuve, Lessoc, Les Sciernes d'Albeuve, Montbovon, Neirivue
- Surrounded by: Bas-Intyamon, Blonay (VD), Château-d'Œx (VD), Châtel-Saint-Denis, Grandvillard, Gruyères, Montreux (VD), Rossinière (VD), Semsales, Veytaux (VD)
- Website: haut-intyamon.ch

Haut-Intyamon (Arpitan: Hôt-Enque-amont, locally Hô-Intyamon) is a municipality in the district of Gruyère in the Canton of Fribourg in Switzerland. It includes the principal settlements of Albeuve, Lessoc, Les Sciernes d'Albeuve, Montbovon and Neirivue.

== Geography ==
Haut-Intyamon is located in the north-south oriented Intyamon valley. This accommodates the Sarine river, which rises in the Bernese Alps and flows north and east before entering the municipality to the south of Montbovon. Here it turns north again, flowing through the Lake Lessoc reservoir, before leaving the municipality between Neirivue and Villars-sous-Mont, and eventually flowing into the Aare river. South of Montbovon, the municipality also includes the valley of the Hongrin river, a tributary of the Sarine.

To the west, the municipality is separated from Lake Geneva by a range of mountains that are part of the Vaud Alps, with the eastern flanks of the mountains within the municipality. From north to south these include Moléson, Teysachaux, Dent de Lys, Vanil des Artses, Cape au Moine, Dent de Jaman, and Rochers de Naye. To the east, the municipality also includes the flanks of Dent de Corjon, which stands between the Hongrin and Sarine rivers, and Vanil Carré, which stands north of the Sarine river.

Whilst a number of paths cross mountain passes through these mountains, the only paved roads into the municipality follow the Sarine river upstream or downstream, or the Hongrin upstream. However the Montreux Oberland Bernois Railway does pass west to Lake Geneva through a tunnel under the Col de Jaman.

Most of the main settlements of the municipality are close to the Sarine river. From south to north, these are Montbovon on the west bank, Lessoc on the east bank, and Albeuve and Neirivue, both on the west bank. The only exception is Les Sciernes d'Albeuve, which is to the west of, and 100 metres (330 ft) higher than, Montbovon.

The municipality has an area, as of 2009, of 60.5 square kilometers (23.4 mi^{2}). Of this area, 29.85 km^{2} (11.53 mi^{2}) or 49.4% is used for agricultural purposes, while 22.91 km^{2} (8.85 mi^{2}) or 37.9% is forested. Of the rest of the land, 1.49 km^{2} (0.58 mi^{2}) or 2.5% is settled (buildings or roads), 0.49 km^{2} (0.19 mi^{2}) or 0.8% is either rivers or lakes and 5.73 km^{2} (2.21 mi^{2}) or 9.5% is unproductive land.

Of the built up area, housing and buildings made up 1.0% and transportation infrastructure made up 1.2%. Out of the forested land, 33.1% of the total land area is heavily forested and 3.6% is covered with orchards or small clusters of trees. Of the agricultural land, 10.7% is pastures and 38.5% is used for alpine pastures. Of the water in the municipality, 0.4% is in lakes and 0.4% is in rivers and streams. Of the unproductive areas, 6.7% is unproductive vegetation and 2.7% is too rocky for vegetation.

== History ==
The municipality of Haut-Intyamon was formed by a merger of the municipalities of Albeuve, Lessoc, Montbovon and Neirivue on 1 January 2002.

== Coat of arms ==
The blazon of the municipal coat of arms is Gules a Bend wavy per bend wavy Sable and Argent and overall a Crane Argent on a Rock Vert.

== Demographics ==
Haut-Intyamon has a population (as of December 2020) of 1,588. As of 2008, 10.6% of the population are resident foreign nationals. Over the last 10 years (2000–2010) the population has changed at a rate of 6%. Migration accounted for 9.2%, while births and deaths accounted for -2.3%.

Most of the population (as of 2000) speaks French (541 or 93.8%) as their first language, German is the second most common (23 or 4.0%) and English is the third (6 or 1.0%). There is 1 person who speaks Italian and 1 person who speaks Romansh.

As of 2008, the population was 51.3% male and 48.7% female. The population was made up of 631 Swiss men (44.4% of the population) and 97 (6.8%) non-Swiss men. There were 611 Swiss women (43.0%) and 81 (5.7%) non-Swiss women. Of the population in the municipality, 288 or about 49.9% were born in Haut-Intyamon and lived there in 2000. There were 162 or 28.1% who were born in the same canton, while 82 or 14.2% were born somewhere else in Switzerland, and 36 or 6.2% were born outside of Switzerland.

As of 2000, children and teenagers (0–19 years old) make up 25.3% of the population, while adults (20–64 years old) make up 54.9% and seniors (over 64 years old) make up 19.8%.

As of 2000, there were 246 people who were single and never married in the municipality. There were 269 married individuals, 43 widows or widowers and 19 individuals who are divorced.

As of 2000, there were 526 private households in the municipality, and an average of 2.4 persons per household. There were 63 households that consist of only one person and 24 households with five or more people. In 2000, a total of 215 apartments (72.4% of the total) were permanently occupied, while 58 apartments (19.5%) were seasonally occupied and 24 apartments (8.1%) were empty. As of 2009, the construction rate of new housing units was 2.1 new units per 1000 residents. The vacancy rate for the municipality, in 2010, was 1.42%.

== Heritage sites of national significance ==
The Former Auberge De La Croix-Blanche À Montbovon, the Chalet d’alpage at En Lys 215, Farm House at Bellegardes 207 A, the fountain in Lessoc and the House de François Fracheboud are listed as Swiss heritage site of national significance. The entire villages of Lessoc and Neirivue and the Montbovon area are all part of the Inventory of Swiss Heritage Sites.

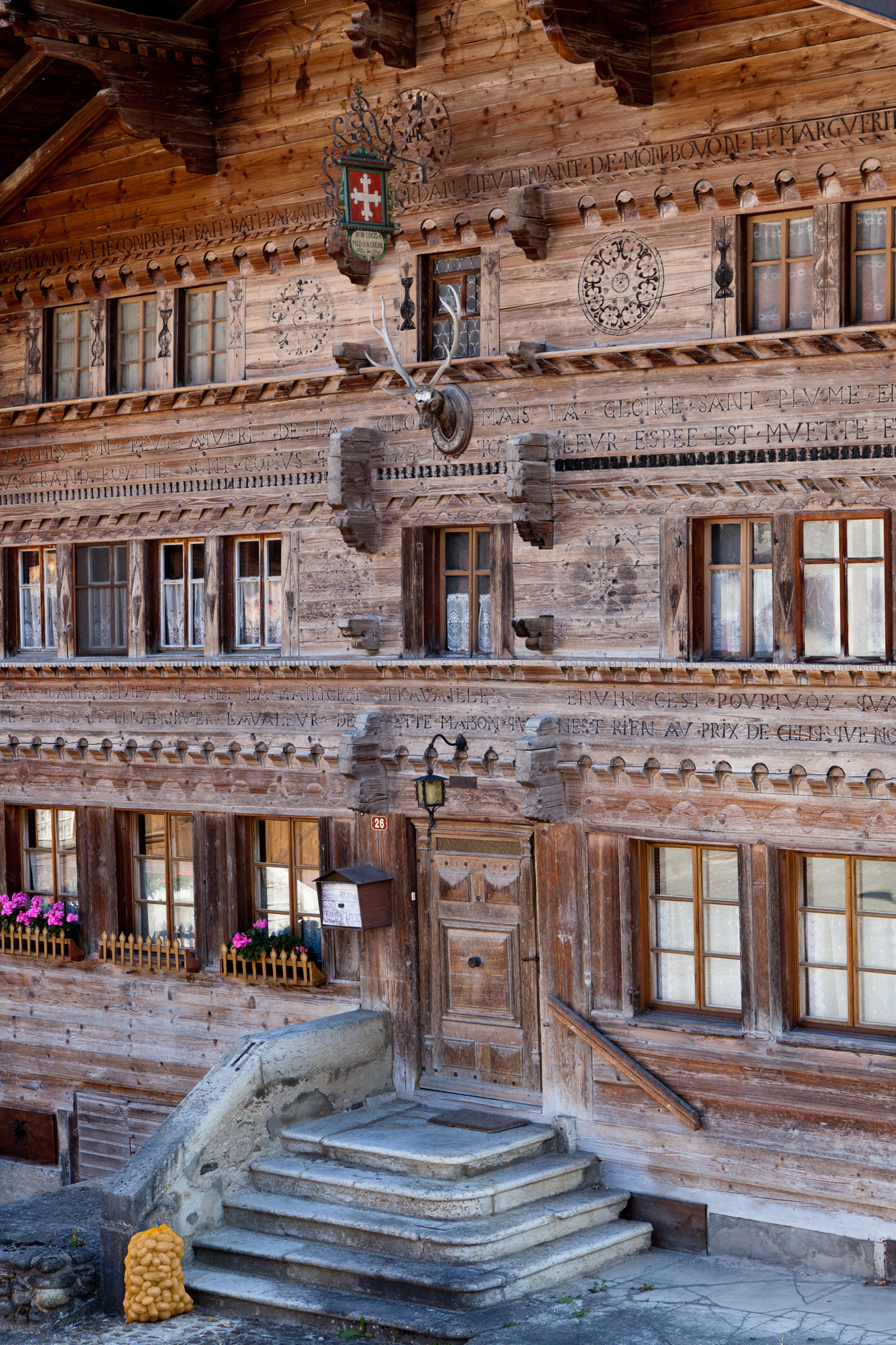
Croix-Blanche inn in Montbovon village

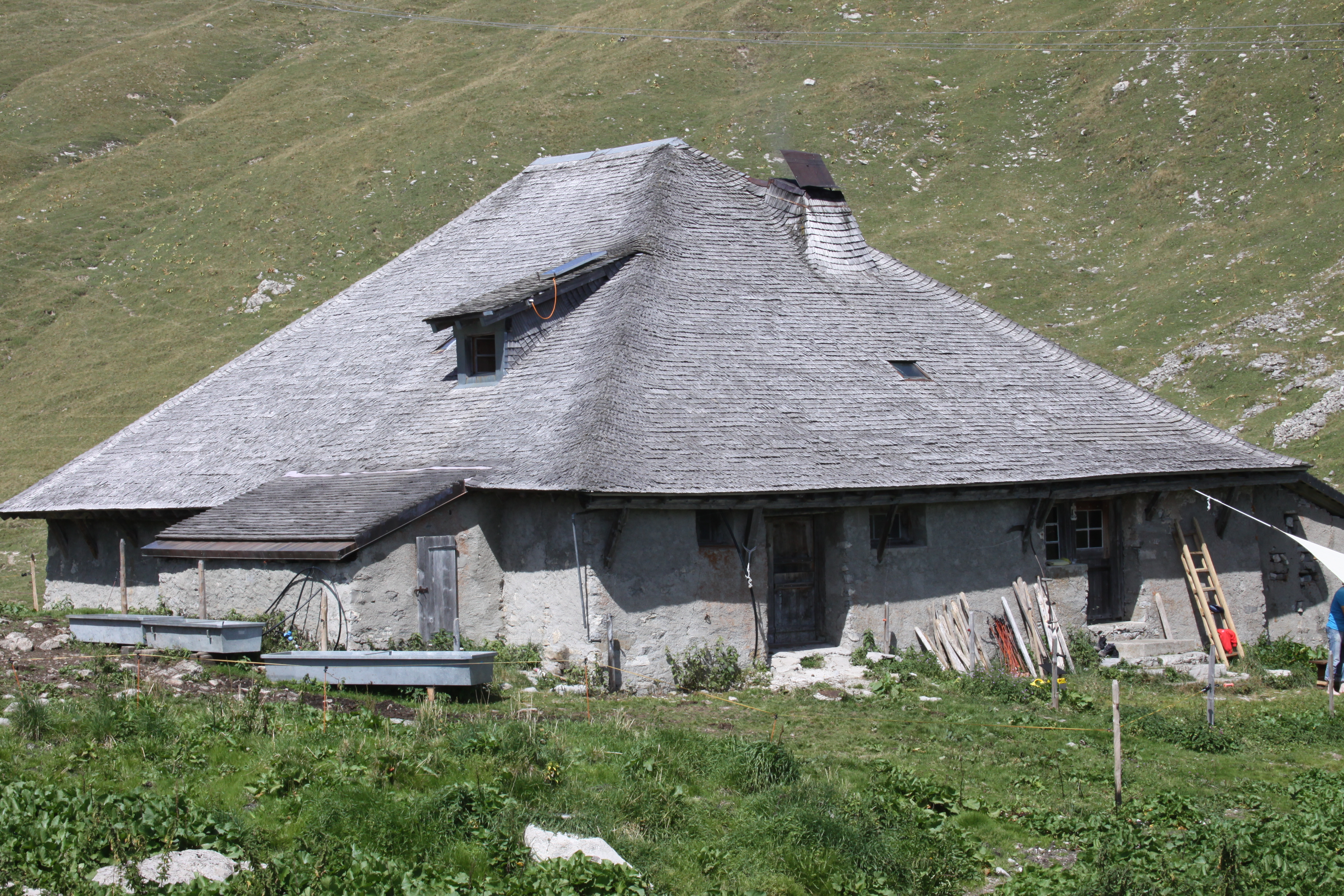
Chalet d’alpage at Albeuve, En Lys 215

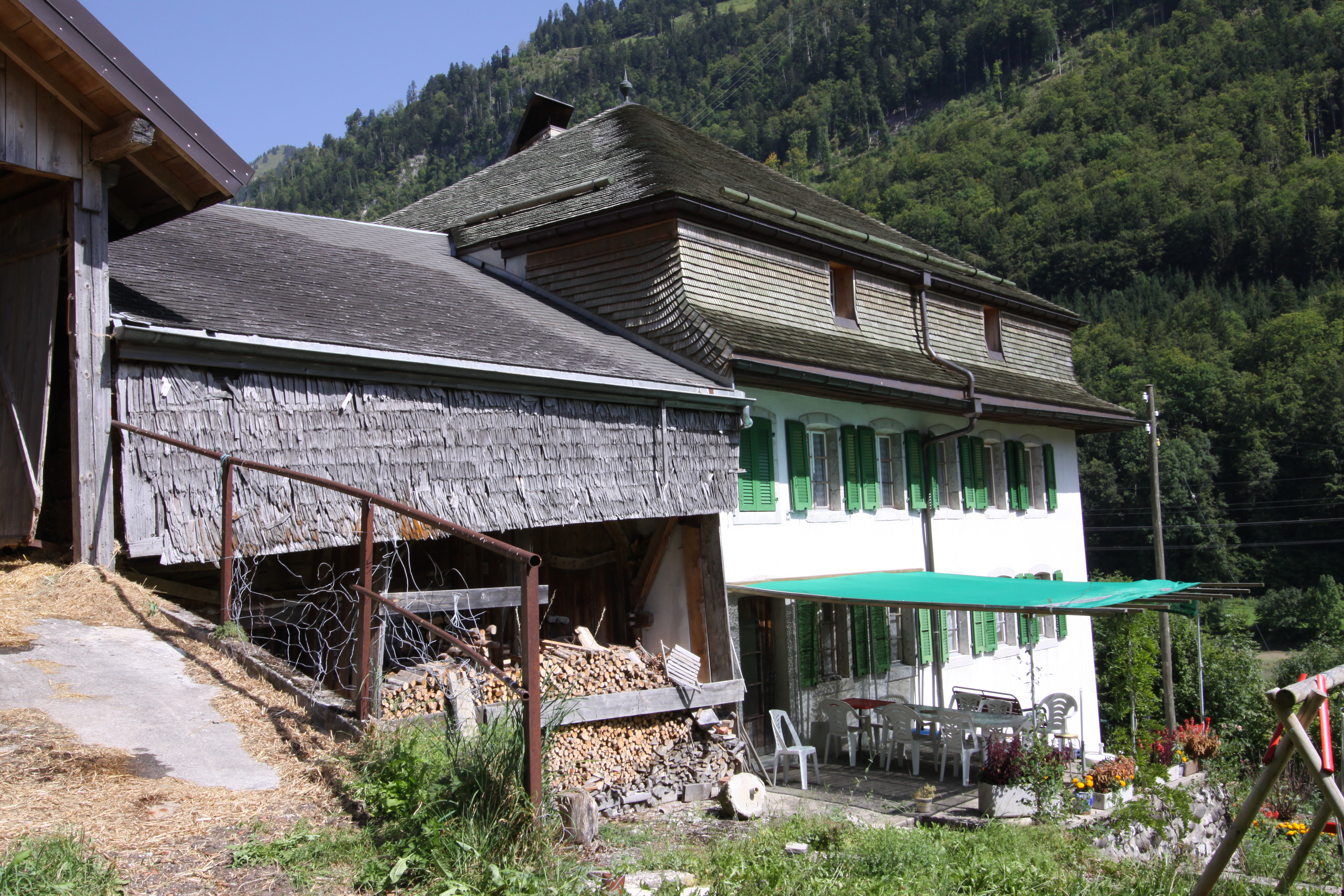
Farm House at Montbovon, Bellegardes 207 A

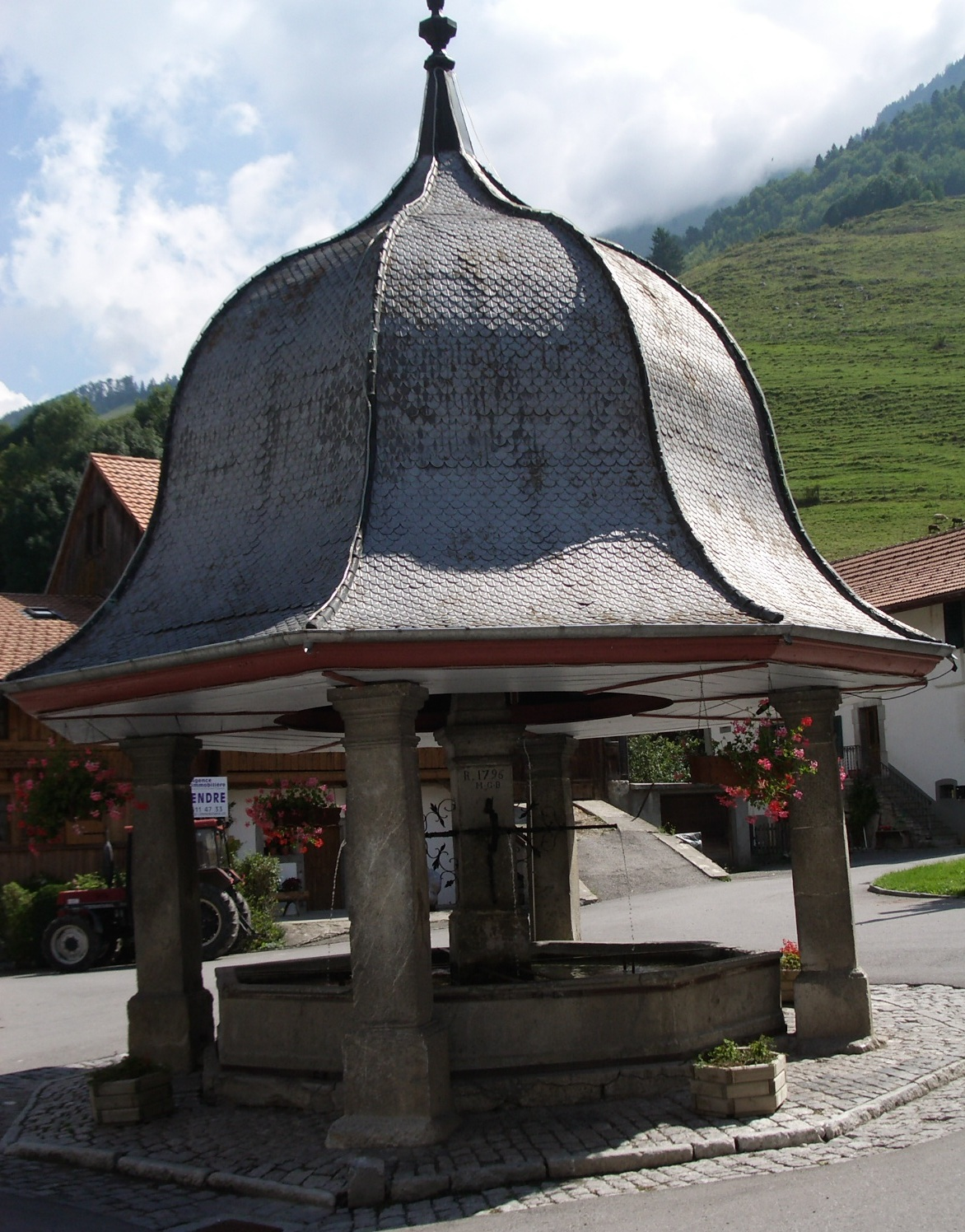
Fountain in Lessoc

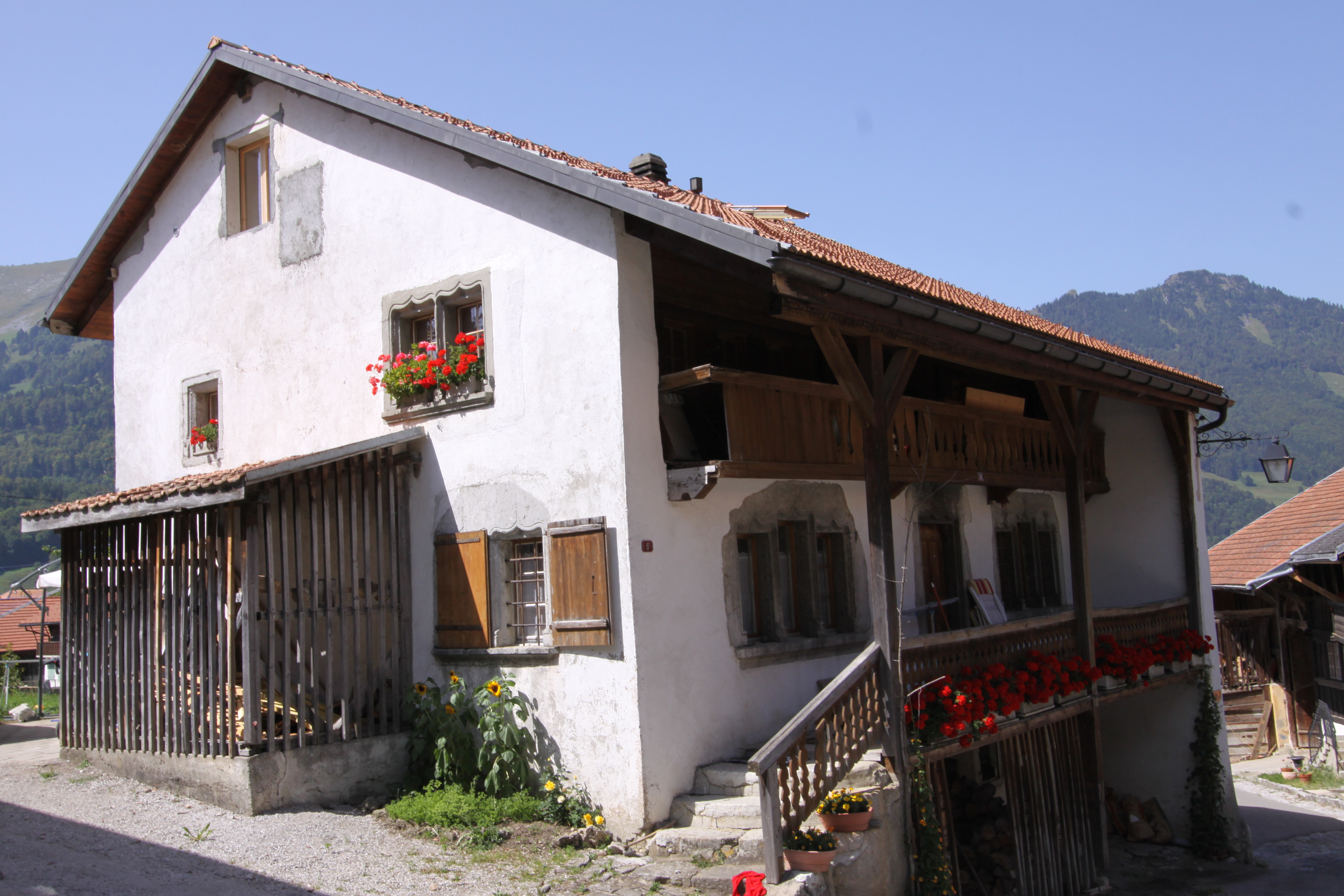
House de François Fracheboud

== Politics ==
In the 2011 federal election the most popular party was the SP which received 26.5% of the vote. The next three most popular parties were the SVP (24.7%), the CVP (24.4%) and the FDP (10.4%).

The SPS improved their position in Haut-Intyamon rising to first, from second in 2007 (with 19.8%) The SVP moved from third in 2007 (with 18.3%) to second in 2011, the CVP moved from first in 2007 (with 42.5%) to third and the FDP retained about the same popularity (9.4% in 2007). A total of 494 votes were cast in this election, of which 8 or 1.6% were invalid.

== Economy ==
As of 2010, Haut-Intyamon had an unemployment rate of 1.8%. As of 2008, there were 83 people employed in the primary economic sector and about 33 businesses involved in this sector. 183 people were employed in the secondary sector and there were 16 businesses in this sector. 121 people were employed in the tertiary sector, with 30 businesses in this sector. There were 276 residents of the municipality who were employed in some capacity, of which females made up 46.4% of the workforce.

In 2008 the total number of full-time equivalent jobs was 316. The number of jobs in the primary sector was 55, of which 47 were in agriculture, 4 were in forestry or lumber production and 4 were in fishing or fisheries. The number of jobs in the secondary sector was 175 of which 109 or (62.3%) were in manufacturing and 57 (32.6%) were in construction. The number of jobs in the tertiary sector was 86. In the tertiary sector; 9 or 10.5% were in wholesale or retail sales or the repair of motor vehicles, 6 or 7.0% were in the movement and storage of goods, 20 or 23.3% were in a hotel or restaurant, 1 was a technical professional or scientist, 15 or 17.4% were in education and 24 or 27.9% were in health care.

In 2000, there were 81 workers who commuted into the municipality and 155 workers who commuted away. The municipality is a net exporter of workers, with about 1.9 workers leaving the municipality for every one entering. Of the working population, 8.4% used public transportation to get to work, and 61.7% used a private car.

== Transport ==
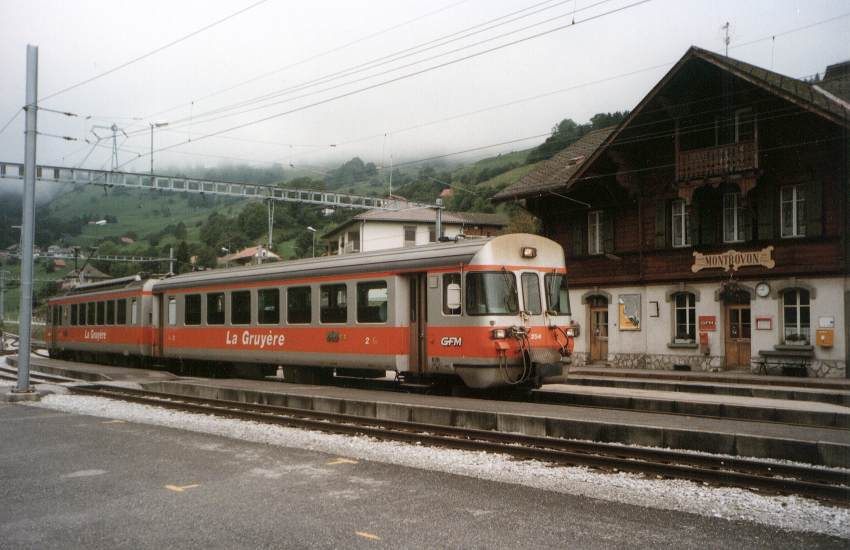
Montbovon train station

=== Railways ===
The municipality is traversed by two 1,000 mm (3 ft 3 3/8 in) metre gauge railway lines, the Palézieux–Bulle–Montbovon line of the Transports publics Fribourgeois (TPF) and the Montreux–Lenk im Simmental line of the Montreux Oberland Bernois Railway (MOB). The two lines form a junction at Montbovon station. In addition to Montbovon, the municipality is also served by Les Cases, Allières and Les Sciernes stations on the MOB, and by Lessoc, Albeuve and Neirivue stations on the TPF.

Montbovon station has a half-hourly service to and from Montreux, and hourly services to and from Château-d'Œx, Gstaad, Zweisimmen, Bulle and Palézieux. The other stations in the municipality have hourly services on their respective lines. Montreux, Zweisimmen, Bulle and Palézieux all provide onward connections to other places in Switzerland and beyond.

=== Roads ===
The municipality straddles Hauptstrasse 190, a road following the Sarine river from Château-d'Œx, to the east, to Bulle, to the north. There is also a minor road that follows the Hongrin river south to Lac de l'Hongrin and La Lecherette. Other minor roads parallel these roads, or link them to other places in the municipality, but none cross the flanking mountain ranges. As a consequence the distance by road from Montbovon to Montreux by road is 50 kilometres (31 mi), considerably further than the 22 kilometres (14 mi) by rail.

== Religion ==
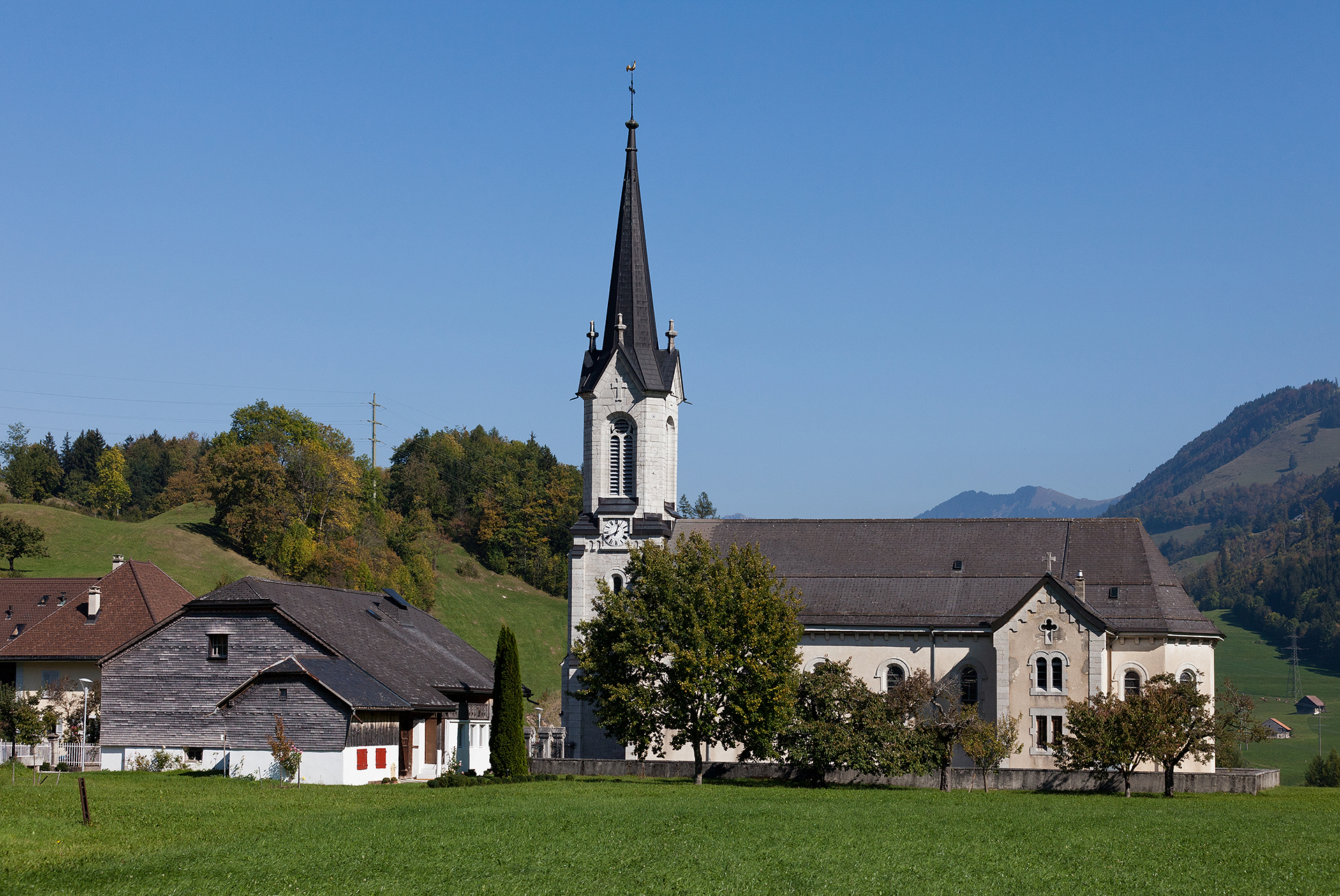
Church Saint-Grat in Montbovon

From the 2000 census, 488 or 84.6% were Roman Catholic, while 34 or 5.9% belonged to the Swiss Reformed Church. Of the rest of the population, there were 4 individuals (or about 0.69% of the population) who belonged to another Christian church. 34 (or about 5.89% of the population) belonged to no church, are agnostic or atheist, and 18 individuals (or about 3.12% of the population) did not answer the question.

== Education ==
In Haut-Intyamon about 197 or (34.1%) of the population have completed non-mandatory upper secondary education, and 45 or (7.8%) have completed additional higher education (either university or a Fachhochschule). Of the 45 who completed tertiary schooling, 53.3% were Swiss men, 28.9% were Swiss women, 13.3% were non-Swiss men.

The Canton of Fribourg school system provides one year of non-obligatory Kindergarten, followed by six years of Primary school. This is followed by three years of obligatory lower Secondary school where the students are separated according to ability and aptitude. Following the lower Secondary students may attend a three or four year optional upper Secondary school. The upper Secondary school is divided into gymnasium (university preparatory) and vocational programs. After they finish the upper Secondary program, students may choose to attend a Tertiary school or continue their apprenticeship.

During the 2010-11 school year, there were a total of 107 students attending 7 classes in Haut-Intyamon. A total of 218 students from the municipality attended any school, either in the municipality or outside of it. There were 2 kindergarten classes with a total of 26 students in the municipality. The municipality had 5 primary classes and 81 students. During the same year, there were no lower secondary classes in the municipality, but 46 students attended lower secondary school in a neighboring municipality. There were no upper Secondary classes or vocational classes, but there were 14 upper Secondary students and 45 upper Secondary vocational students who attended classes in another municipality. The municipality had no non-university Tertiary classes, but there were 5 non-university Tertiary students who attended classes in another municipality.

As of 2000, there were 14 students in Haut-Intyamon who came from another municipality, while 78 residents attended schools outside the municipality.
