= Lac de Lessoc =

Reservoir in Fribourg, Switzerland

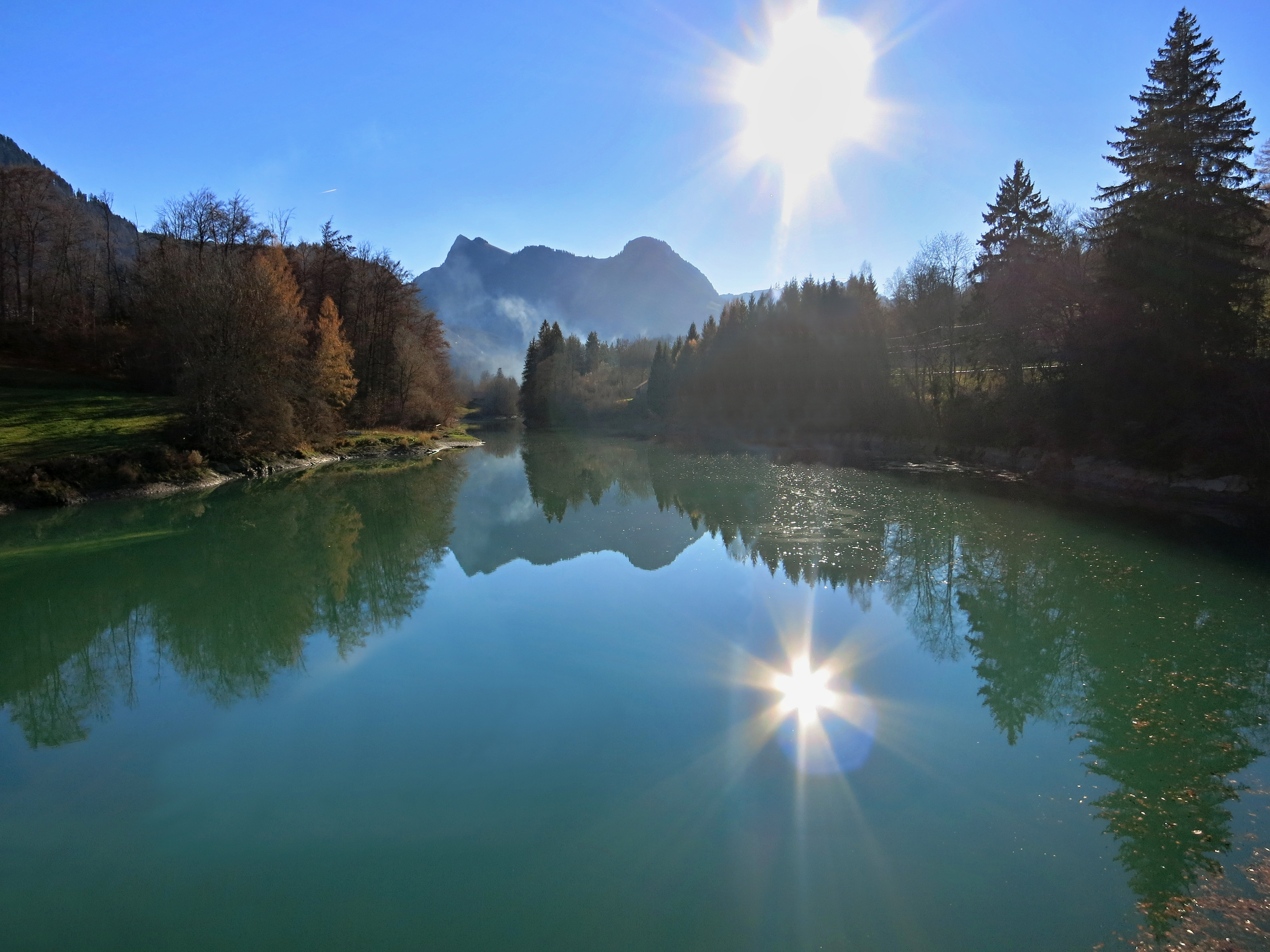
- Lower lake, looking towards Dent de Corjon

- Location within Canton of Fribourg Location within Switzerland Location within Alps
- Interactive map of Lac de Lessoc
- Location: Montbovon, Fribourg
- Coordinates: 46°29′48″N 7°3′7″E
- Primary inflows: Saane/Sarine
- Primary outflows: Saane/Sarine
- Catchment area: 506 km^{2} (195 sq mi)
- Basin countries: Switzerland
- Surface area: 20 ha (49 acres)
- Surface elevation: 774 m (2,539 ft)

Lac de Lessoc (or Lac de Montbovon) is a reservoir on the Saane/Sarine river between Lessoc and Montbovon in the Canton of Fribourg, Switzerland. The lake's surface area is 20 ha (49 acres). The Lessoc dam with a height of 33 m was completed in 1976.
