= Senin =

Senin may refer to:

== People ==
- Adolph Senin, an alias of Jack Soble (1903–1967), Lithuanian spy for the Soviet Union
- Adrian Senin (born 1979), Romanian footballer
- Agustín Senin (born 1946), Spanish boxer
- Ivan Senin (1903–1981), Ukrainian Soviet politician
- Vladimir Senin (born 1960), Russian politician
- Senin Sebai (born 1993), Ivorian footballer
- Sanin Husain (c. 1847–1909), a Mahdist State religious military leader also known as Senin Wad Hussein, Ali Feki Senin, and Fekhi Senin

== Places ==
- Lac de Sénin, a Swiss lake and reservoir
- Col de Sénin, a Swiss mountain pass

== See also ==
- Sergejs Seņins (born 1972), Latvian retired ice hockey player
- Sanin (disambiguation), including several people with the surname
