= Pierre de Zurich =

Swiss historian (1881–1947)

Count Pierre Marie Joseph de Zurich (1881–1947) was a Swiss historian, specializing on the history of the city and canton of Fribourg. He was the son of colonel Ernest de Zurich, of the comital de Zurich family of Lessoc, and of Jeanne de Reynold, of the comital de Reynold family of Fribourg. He studied in Fribourg and Munich. He married Jeanne de Weck, daughter of Rodolphe de Weck, director of the Société des tramways de Fribourg in 1907. He is known for having established the foundational date of the city of Fribourg (a Zähringer city) from primary sources, as 1157.

He lived in Fribourg, in Pérolles castle, an estate he had inherited from his mother, and later in an estate he had built in Barberêche. He served as municipal councillor of Barberêche, as member of the cantonal assembly of Fribourg, and as infantry major in the Swiss army. He was president or board member of numerous societies, among them Société d'histoire du canton de Fribourg and Société d'histoire de la Suisse romande.

== Selected publications ==
- 1918. Les fiefs Tierstein et le terrier de 1442.
- 1924. Les origines de Fribourg et le quartier du Bourg aux XVe et XVIe siècles
- 1928. La maison bourgoise dans le Canton de Fribourg (vol. 20 of La maison bourgeoise en Suisse )
- 1934. Une femme heureuse (1755-1844) Madame de la Briche : sa famille, son salon le château du Marais, d'apres ses memoires, sa correspondance et d'autres documents inedits
- 1935. Les voyages en Suisse de Madame de la Briche en 1785 et 1788

== See also ==
- Gonzague de Reynold

== Sources ==
- Bernard de Vevey, "Pierre de Zurich: 1881–1947" [obituary], Revue d'histoire suisse 27 (1947), 95f.
- Catherine Waeber: Pierre de Zurich in German, French and Italian in the online Historical Dictionary of Switzerland, 2013.
- C. Waeber, "Pierre de Zurich et Barberêche", Pro Fribourg 97 (1992), 30–32.
