= Neirivue =

Former municipality, canton of Fribourg

- Former municipality
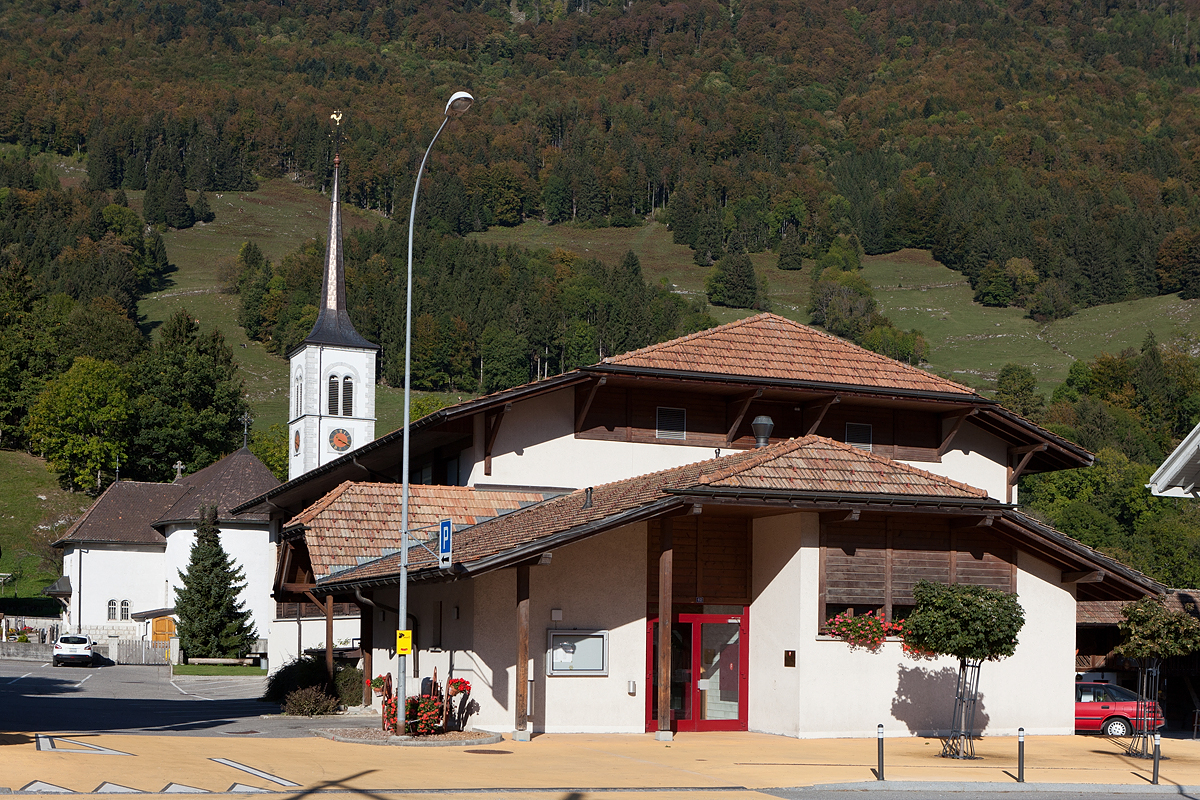
- Village center with the church
- Location of Neirivue
- Location within Switzerland Location within Canton of Fribourg
- Coordinates: 46.52611°N 7.05833°E
- Country: Switzerland
- Canton: Fribourg
- District: Gruyère
- Municipality: Haut-Intyamon

Population (2000)
  - Total: 329
- Time zone: UTC+01:00 (CET)
  - Summer (DST): UTC+02:00 (CEST)
- ISO 3166 code: CH-FR
- Website

Neirivue (old German name Schwarzwasser) is a former municipality in the Gruyère district of the canton of Fribourg, Switzerland, on the left bank of the Sarine. In 2002 it merged with Albeuve, Lessoc and Montbovon to form the municipality of Haut-Intyamon.

== History ==
Neirivue is first mentioned in 1277 as Nigra aqua. In the Middle Ages the village was part of the county of Gruyère. It came under Fribourg rule in 1555, was incorporated into the bailiwick of Gruyère until 1798 and was then assigned to the district of Gruyère (1798–1848).

In church matters, Neirivue belonged first to the parish of Bulle and then to that of Gruyères (1254), before becoming a parish of its own in 1609. The church of Saint Francis of Assisi was built in 1609–1614 and rebuilt after 1904. The chapel of Notre-Dame-de-l'Evi (1863, rebuilt in 2001), which succeeded an 18th-century oratory, is a regional place of pilgrimage. Three fires destroyed the village, in 1791, 1812 and 1904.

In the 19th century livestock farming was supplemented by straw plaiting, the wood industry and a sandstone quarry. The railway station on the Bulle–Montbovon line dates from 1903. Furniture was made and sold by Eisa SA (1937–2005) and Castella Frères (from 1948), and the fish farm Pisciculture de la Gruyère SA dates from 1981. In 2000 there were three farms (livestock farming).

Neirivue had 223 inhabitants in 1811, 220 in 1850, 280 in 1900, 322 in 1950 and 329 in 2000. In 2002 it merged with Albeuve, Lessoc and Montbovon to form Haut-Intyamon.

== Bibliography ==
- A. Dellion, Dictionnaire historique et statistique des paroisses catholiques du canton de Fribourg, vol. 9, pp. 5–23
- R. Bochud, L'incendie de Neirivue, 1906
- Paroisse de Neirivue 1609–1916, manuscript, 1916 (Cantonal and University Library of Fribourg)
- J.-P. Anderegg, La maison paysanne fribourgeoise, vol. 2, 1987, pp. 75–76
