= Albeuve =

Former municipality, canton of Fribourg

- Former municipality
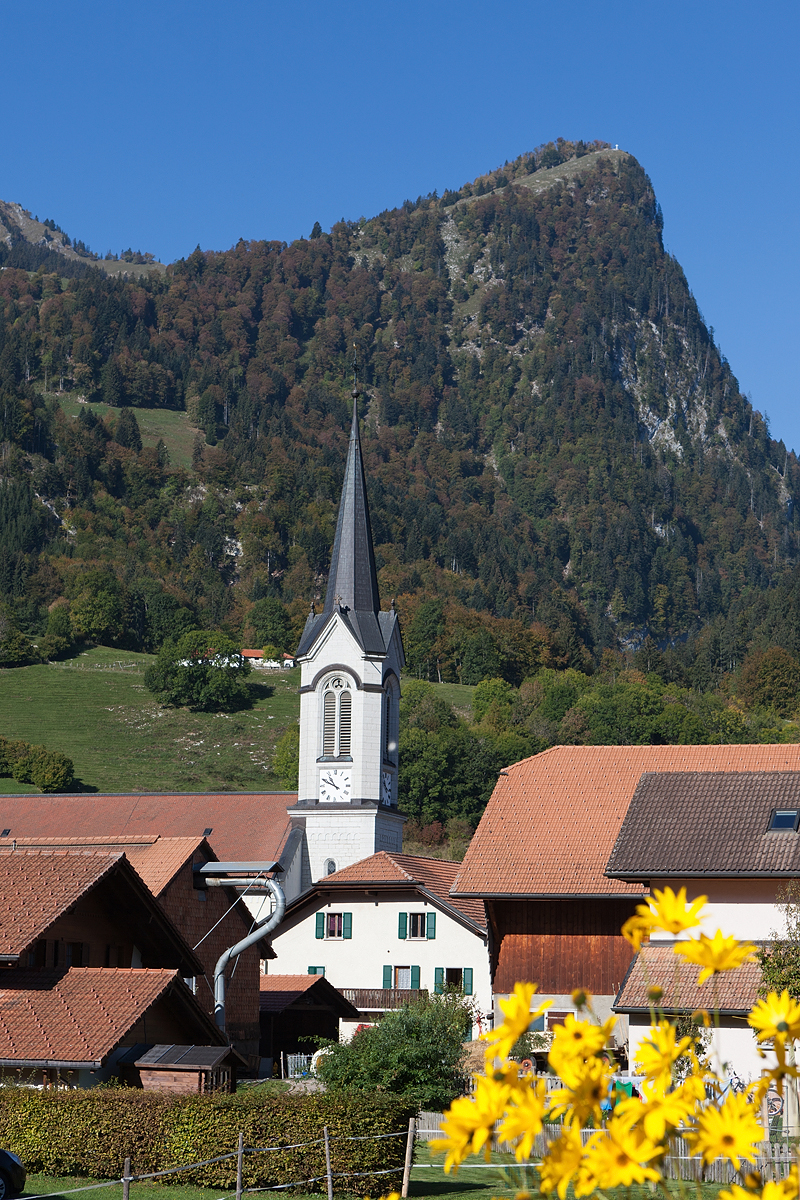
- Village and church

- Coat of arms
- Location of Albeuve
- Location within Switzerland Location within Canton of Fribourg
- Coordinates: 46.51472°N 7.05528°E
- Country: Switzerland
- Canton: Fribourg
- District: Gruyère
- Municipality: Haut-Intyamon

Population (2000)
  - Total: 577
- Time zone: UTC+01:00 (CET)
  - Summer (DST): UTC+02:00 (CEST)
- ISO 3166 code: CH-FR
- Website

Albeuve is a former municipality in the Gruyère district of the canton of Fribourg, Switzerland. In 2002 it merged with Lessoc, Montbovon and Neirivue to form the municipality of Haut-Intyamon. On the left bank of the Sarine, it comprised the village of Albeuve and the hamlet of Les Sciernes.

== History ==
Albeuve is first mentioned between 1019 and 1037 as Alba aqua, and in 1171 as Erbiwi. It was a possession of the bishop of Lausanne, forming an enclave in the county of Gruyère. Between 1019 and 1037 Bishop Hugh of Burgundy gave it to the cathedral chapter, which ceded it back to Bishop Guillaume de Champvent in 1291. In 1481 Bishop Benoît de Montferrand freed the inhabitants from the taille (a tax). Invaded by Fribourg troops in 1536 and attached to Fribourg in 1537, Albeuve was incorporated into the bailiwick of Bulle.

In the 9th or 10th century Albeuve separated from the parish of Bulle to form a parish of its own, which included Montbovon until 1618. After a fire destroyed the village in 1876, the church, dedicated to the Assumption, was rebuilt from 1876 to 1883. The railway station on the Palézieux–Montbovon line was built in 1902.

The economy was based on fodder crops, cattle breeding and the cheese industry. Land consolidation took place in 1950–1956. The wood industry produced chalets (1897), furniture (1951) and kitchen fittings (1957).

Albeuve had 522 inhabitants in 1811, 515 in 1850, 460 in 1870, 508 in 1900, 575 in 1950 and 577 in 2000. In 2002 it merged with Lessoc, Montbovon and Neirivue to form Haut-Intyamon.

== Bibliography ==
- A. Dellion, Dictionnaire historique et statistique des paroisses catholiques du canton de Fribourg, vol. 1, pp. 5–48
- La Liberté, 13 January 1937
- C. Fontaine, "Nos villages gru[y]ériens: Albeuve", in Le vieux chalet, nos. 76–82, 1960–1961
