= Pont de Berne =

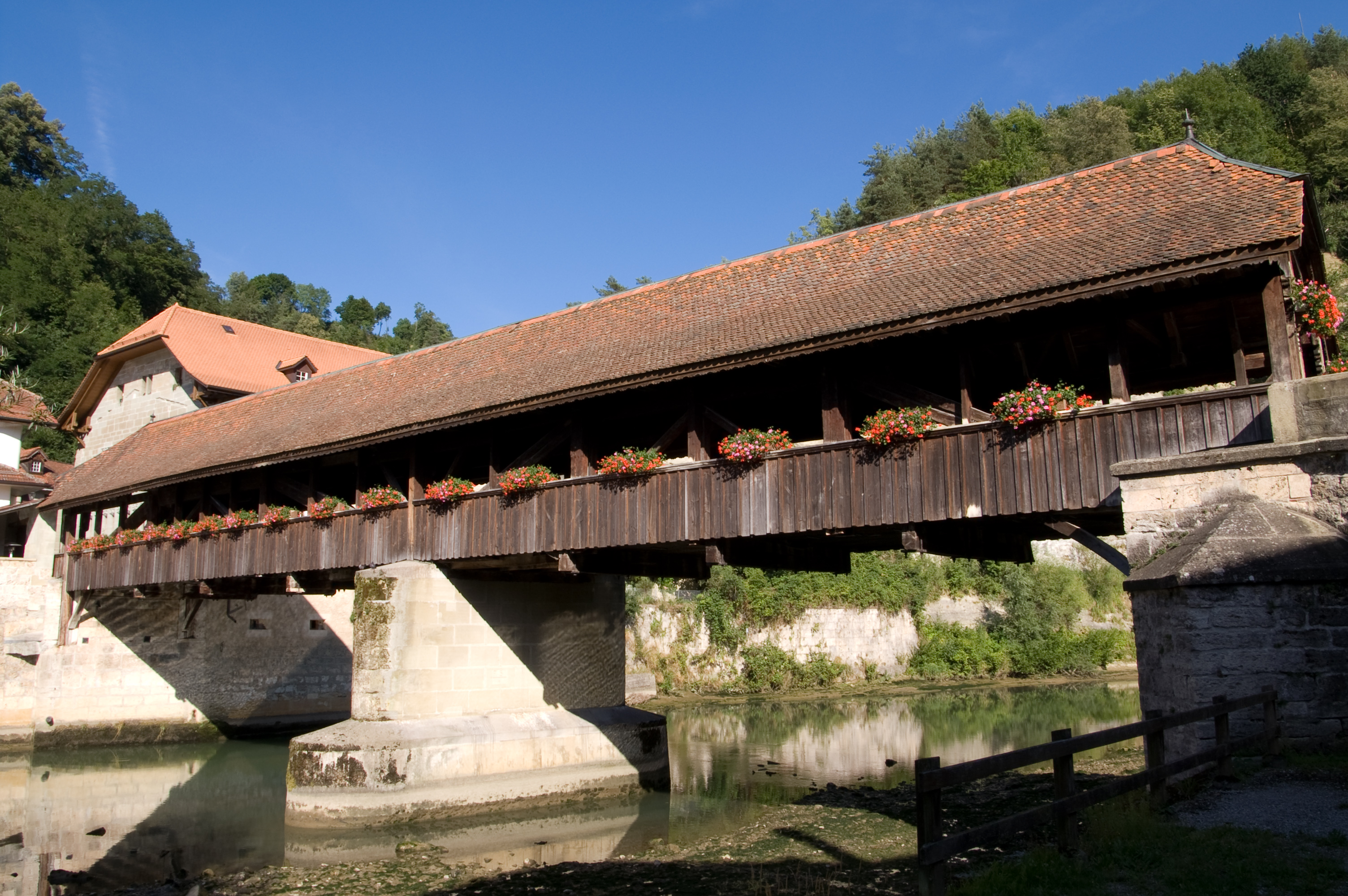
- Coordinates: 46°48′15″N 7°10′08″E
- Crosses: Sarine
- Locale: Fribourg, Switzerland

History
- Built: 1250

Location
- Interactive map of Pont de Berne

The Pont de Berne is a covered bridge on the Sarine river, located in the canton of Fribourg, in Switzerland.

== History ==
Built in 1250, a century after the city's founding, it is one of the oldest in Switzerland. Over the centuries, it has been regularly renovated and remains today the last covered wooden bridge in Fribourg.

Until 1838, the bridge was defended by the Flies Gate Tower, an opening in the ramparts of the Lower Town.
