= Story of the Alps: My Annette =

Japanese anime television series

- Cover art from the DVD release of Alps Story: My Annette re-edited footage film.
- Also known as: Alps Story: My Annette
- アルプス物語 わたしのアンネット
- Genre: Drama
- Based on: Treasures of the Snow by Patricia St. John
- Written by: Kenji Yoshida; Hiroshi Otsuka (ep. 30)
- Directed by: Kōzō Kusuba
- Music by: Ryōhei Hirose
- Country of origin: Japan
- Original language: Japanese
- No. of episodes: 48

Production
- Executive producer: Koichi Motohashi
- Producer: Takaji Matsudo
- Production companies: Nippon Animation; Fuji Television

Original release
- Network: FNS (Fuji TV)
- Release: January 9 – December 25, 1983

Alps Story: My Annette (アルプス物語 わたしのアンネット, Arupusu Monogatari Watashi no Annetto) is a 1983 anime series by Nippon Animation. 48 episodes aired on Fuji TV as part of the World Masterpiece Theater staple.

It is based on the children's book Treasures of the Snow by Patricia St. John and set in the Swiss mountain village of Rossinière.

The anime is dubbed in other languages like French, German, Greek, Italian, Spanish, Persian, Hungarian, Polish, Portuguese and Arabic.

A 1979 film A Treasure in the Snow was made by Mike Pritchard in adaptation of Patricia Saint-John's novel.

== Cast ==
- Keiko Han as Annette Burnier
- Sanae Miyuki as Daniel Burnier
- Eiko Yamada as Lucien Morel
- Rihoko Yoshida as Marie Morel
- Osamu Kobayashi as Pierre Burnier

The anime had one opening and one ending theme. The opening theme is "Annette no Aoi Sora" and the ending theme "Edelweiss no Shiroi Hana", both performed by Keiko Han (潘恵子).

== Episode list ==
No.	Title	Original release date
1	"Annette and Lucien"; Transliteration: "Annetto to Rushien" (Japanese: アンネットとルシエン)	January 9, 1983
2	"The Day of the Sled Riding Contest"; Transliteration: "Sori-kyōsō no hi ni" (Japanese: ソリ競争の日に)	January 16, 1983
3	"Love and Sadness"; Transliteration: "Ai to kanashimi to" (Japanese: 愛と悲しみと)	January 23, 1983
4	"Annette Becomes a Mother"; Transliteration: "Okāsan ni natta Annetto" (Japanese: おかあさんになったアンネット)	January 4, 1983
5	"A New Family"; Transliteration: "Atarashī kazoku" (Japanese: あたらしい家族)	February 6, 1983
6	"At the Pasture"; Transliteration: "Bokujō ni te" (Japanese: 牧場にて)	February 13, 1983
7	"Let's Make Cheese"; Transliteration: "Chīzu o tsukurō" (Japanese: チーズを作ろう)	February 20, 1983
8	"The Day of the Fall Festival"; Transliteration: "Akimatsuri no hi ni" (Japanese: 秋まつりの日に)	February 27, 1983
9	"The Train Arrives in the Village"; Transliteration: "Mura ni kisha ga yatte kita" (Japanese: 村に汽車がやって来た)	March 6, 1983
10	"Our Adventure Trip"; Transliteration: "Futari no bōken ryokō" (Japanese: ふたりの冒険旅行)	March 13, 1983
11	"The Christmas Present"; Transliteration: "Kurisumasu no okurimono" (Japanese: クリスマスの贈り物)	March 20, 1983
12	"Events In The White Forest"; Transliteration: "Shiroi mori no dekigoto" (Japanese: 白い森のできごと)	March 27, 1983
13	"The Mistaken Heart"; Transliteration: "Surechigau kokoro" (Japanese: すれ違うこころ)	April 3, 1983
14	"A Terrible Incident"; Transliteration: "Osoroshī dekigoto" (Japanese: おそろしい出来事)	April 10, 1983
15	"Save Dani!"; Transliteration: "Danī o tasukete!" (Japanese: ダニーを助けて！)	April 17, 1983
16	"The Hospital"; Transliteration: "Byōin" (Japanese: 病院)	April 24, 1983
17	"The Old Man in the Forest"; Transliteration: "Mori no rōjin" (Japanese: 森の老人)	May 1, 1983
18	"Dani's Crutches"; Transliteration: "Danī no matsubazue" (Japanese: ダニーの松葉杖)	May 8, 1983
19	"The Unthinkable Diagnosis"; Transliteration: "Omoigakenai shindan" (Japanese: 思いがけない診断)	May 15, 1983
20	"Noah's Ark"; Transliteration: "Noa no hakobune" (Japanese: ノアの方舟)	May 22, 1983
21	"Overwhelming Sin"; Transliteration: "Tsumi no omosa" (Japanese: 罪の重さ)	June 5, 1983
22	"Dani's Treasure"; Transliteration: "Danī no takaramono" (Japanese: ダニーの宝物)	June 12, 1983
23	"The Sad Lie"; Transliteration: "Kanashī uso" (Japanese: 悲しい嘘)	June 19, 1983
24	"Annette's Tears"; Transliteration: "Annetto no namida" (Japanese: アンネットの涙)	June 26, 1983
25	"The Pasture of Memories"; Transliteration: "Omoide no bokujō" (Japanese: おもいでの牧場)	July 3, 1983
26	"The Distant Clouds, The Distant Days"; Transliteration: "Tōi kumo tōi hibi" (Japanese: 遠い雲 遠い日々)	July 10, 1983
27	"Monsieur Nicholas's Students"; Transliteration: "Nikorasu sensei no oshiego-tachi" (Japanese: ニコラス先生の教え子たち)	July 17, 1983
28	"Turning Towards the Exhibition"; Transliteration: "Tenrankai ni mukete" (Japanese: 展覧会にむけて)	July 24, 1983
29	"Ruined Dreams"; Transliteration: "Kowasareta yume" (Japanese: こわされた夢)	August 7, 1983
30	"Tears of Regret"; Transliteration: "Kōkai no namida" (Japanese: 後悔の涙)	August 14, 1983
31	"Following the Road to the Mountain Pass"; Transliteration: "Tōge e tsuzuku michi" (Japanese: 峠へつづく道)	August 21, 1983
32	"I Want to Tell the Truth"; Transliteration: "Tsutaetai shinjitsu" (Japanese: 伝えたい真実)	August 28, 1983
33	"A Brave Confession"; Transliteration: "Yūki aru kokuhaku" (Japanese: 勇気ある告白)	September 4, 1983
34	"Farewell, Franz"; Transliteration: "Sayōnara Furantsu" (Japanese: さようならフランツ)	September 18, 1983
35	"Opening the Door to the Heart"; Transliteration: "Kokoro no tobira o hiraite" (Japanese: 心の扉をひらいて)	September 25, 1983
36	"Rekindled Friendship"; Transliteration: "Yomigaetta yūjō" (Japanese: よみがえった友情)	October 2, 1983
37	"Our Treasure"; Transliteration: "Futari no takaramono" (Japanese: 二人のたからもの)	October 9, 1983
38	"Lucien's Vow"; Transliteration: "Rushien no chikai" (Japanese: ルシエンの誓い)	October 16, 1983
39	"Crossing the Snowy Mountain Pass"; Transliteration: "Fubuki no tōge o koete" (Japanese: 吹雪の峠をこえて)	October 23, 1983
40	"Stand Up, Lucien"; Transliteration: "Tachiagare Rushien" (Japanese: 立ち上がれ ルシエン)	October 30, 1983
41	"Would You Treat Dani?"; Transliteration: "Danī o mite kuremasu ka" (Japanese: ダニーを診てくれますか)	November 6, 1983
42	"Monsieur Peguin's Secret"; Transliteration: "Pegin jī-san no himitsu" (Japanese: ペギンじいさんの秘密)	November 13, 1983
43	"Lausanne, The City of Hope"; Transliteration: "Kibō no machi Rōzannu" (Japanese: 希望の町 ローザンヌ)	November 20, 1983
44	"The People in the Givet Household"; Transliteration: "Gibetto-ke no hitobito" (Japanese: ギベット家のひとびと)	November 27, 1983
45	"The Day of the Operation"; Transliteration: "Shujutsu no hi" (Japanese: 手術の日)	December 4, 1983
46	"Reunion"; Transliteration: "Saikai" (Japanese: 再会)	December 11, 1983
47	"Within the Bright Light"; Transliteration: "Kagayaku hikari no naka de" (Japanese: 輝く光の中で)	December 18, 1983
48	"Forever Friends"; Transliteration: "Yūjō yo eien ni" (Japanese: 友情よ 永遠に)	December 25, 1983
