= Sanin =

Sanin may refer to:

- Alexander Sanin (1869–1956), stage name of Alexander Akimovich Shoenberg, Russian actor and director
- Vladimir Sanin (1928–1989), Russian traveler and writer
- Joseph Volotsky (secular name Ivan Sanin; 1439 or 1440–1515), Russian theologian and saint
- Sanin (novel), novel by the Russian writer Mikhail Artsybashev
- San'in region in Japan

== See also ==
- Senin (disambiguation)
- Shanin (disambiguation)
