= Lac du Vernex =

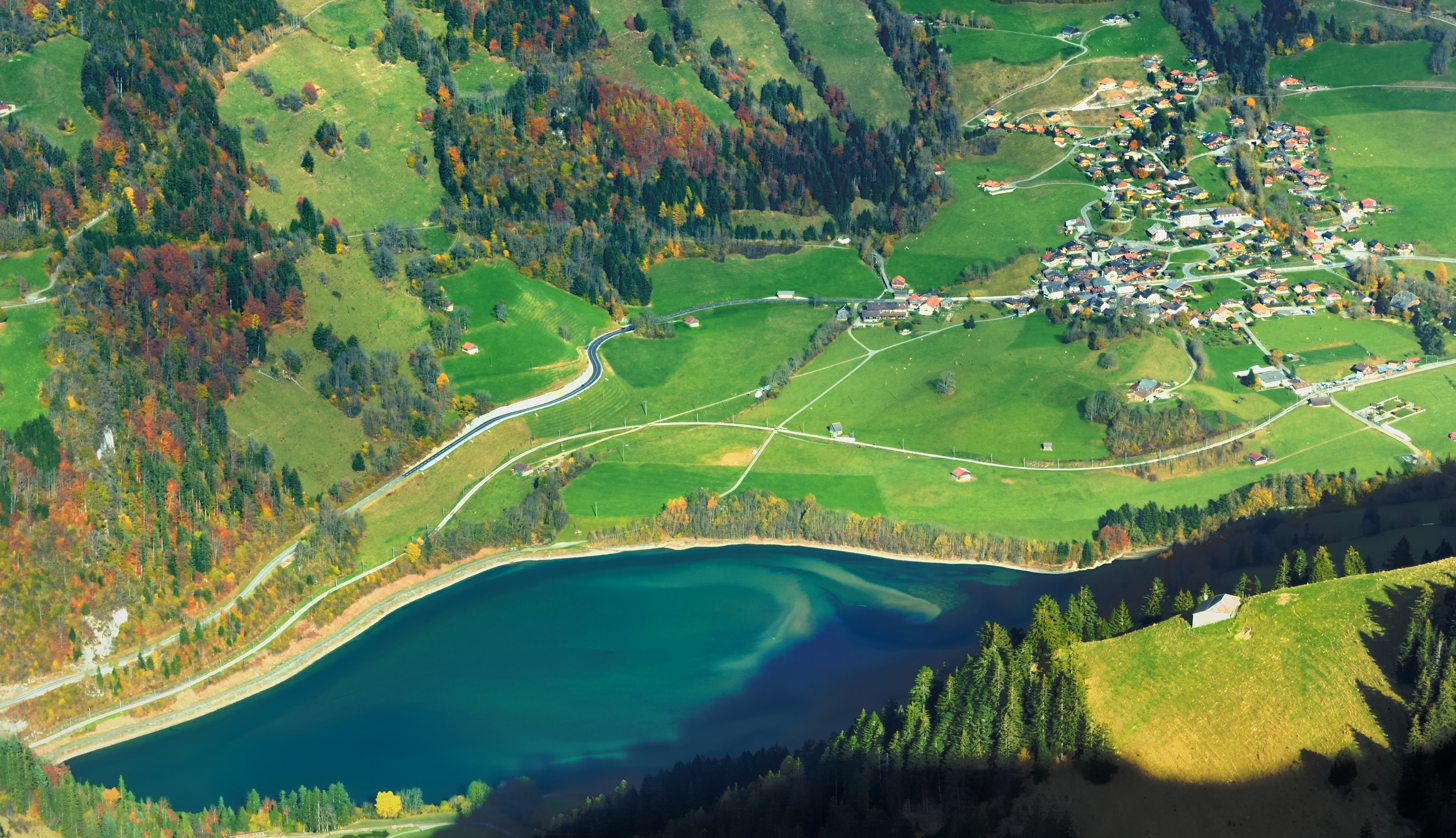
- View of Lac du Vernex and Rossinière from the Planachaux summit

- Location within Canton of Vaud Location within Switzerland Location within Alps
- Interactive map of Lac du Vernex
- Location: Rossinière, Vaud
- Coordinates: 46°27′49″N 7°4′18″E
- Type: reservoir
- Primary inflows: Saane/Sarine
- Primary outflows: Saane/Sarine
- Catchment area: 398 km^{2} (154 sq mi)
- Basin countries: Switzerland
- Surface area: 32 ha (79 acres)
- Surface elevation: 860 m (2,820 ft)

Lac du Vernex is a reservoir on the Saane/Sarine river at Rossinière, in the Pays d'Enhaut of the canton of Vaud. It lies at an elevation of 859 m (2,818 ft) above sea level, between the Pointe de Cray and Planachaux mountains.

== See also ==
- List of mountain lakes of Switzerland
