= Rossinière =

- Municipality
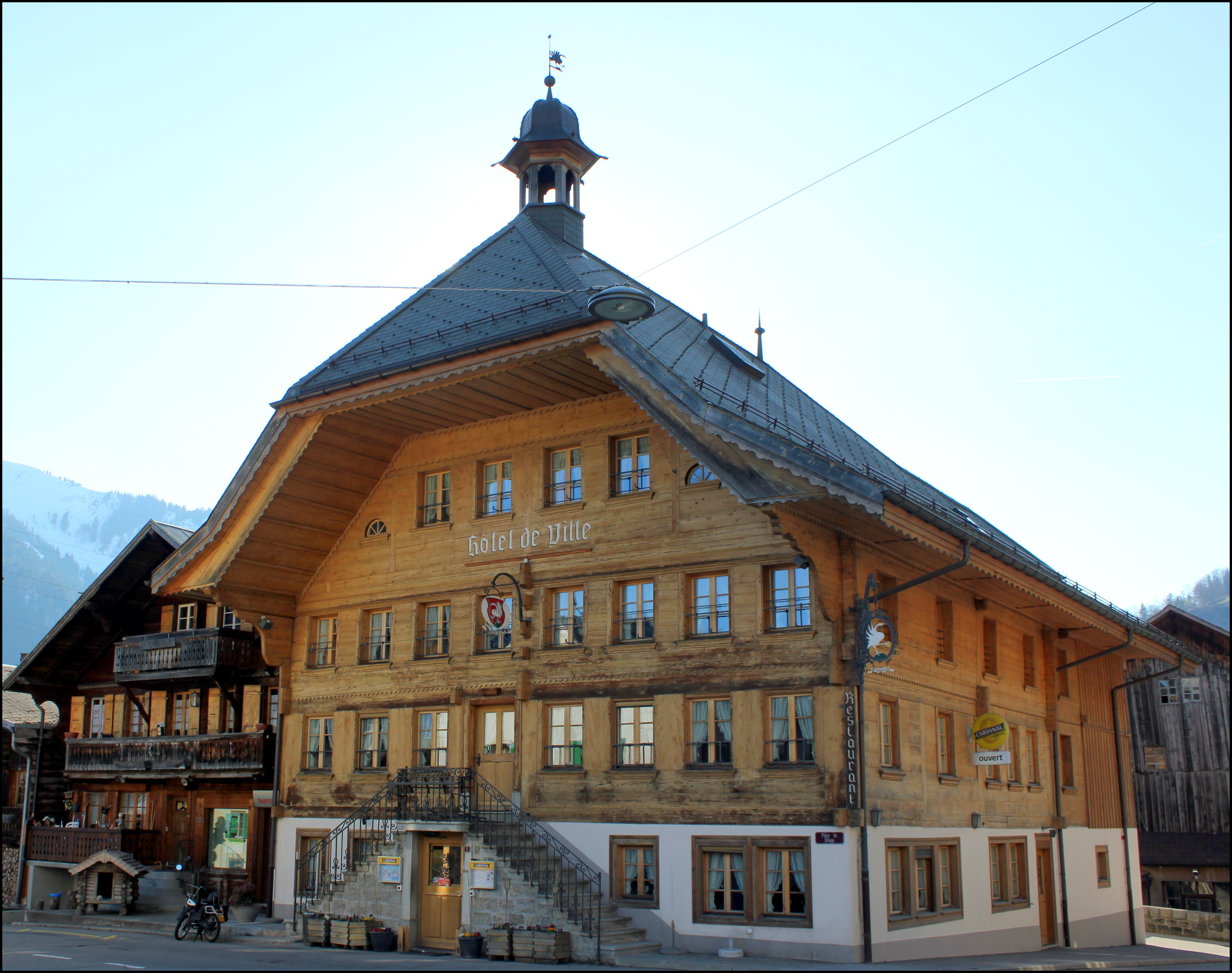
- Rossinière town hall

- Flag Coat of arms
- Location of Rossinière
- Location within Switzerland Location within Canton of Vaud
- Coordinates: 46°28′N 7°05′E
- Country: Switzerland
- Canton: Vaud
- District: Riviera-Pays-d'Enhaut

Government
  - Mayor: Syndic; Jean-Pierre Neff

Area
  - Total: 23.4 km^{2} (9.0 sq mi)
- Elevation: 920 m (3,020 ft)

Population (2000)
  - Total: 492
  - Density: 21.0/km^{2} (54.5/sq mi)
- Time zone: UTC+01:00 (CET)
  - Summer (DST): UTC+02:00 (CEST)
- Postal code: 1658
- SFOS number: 5842
- ISO 3166 code: CH-VD
- Localities: La Chaudanne, La Tine
- Surrounded by: Château-d'Oex, Villeneuve, Veytaux, Canton of Fribourg
- Website: rossiniere.ch

Rossinière (French pronunciation: [ʁɔsinjɛʁ]) is a municipality in the Riviera-Pays-d'Enhaut district of the canton of Vaud in Switzerland.

== History ==
Rossinière is first mentioned in 1155 as La Ransonery.

== Geography ==
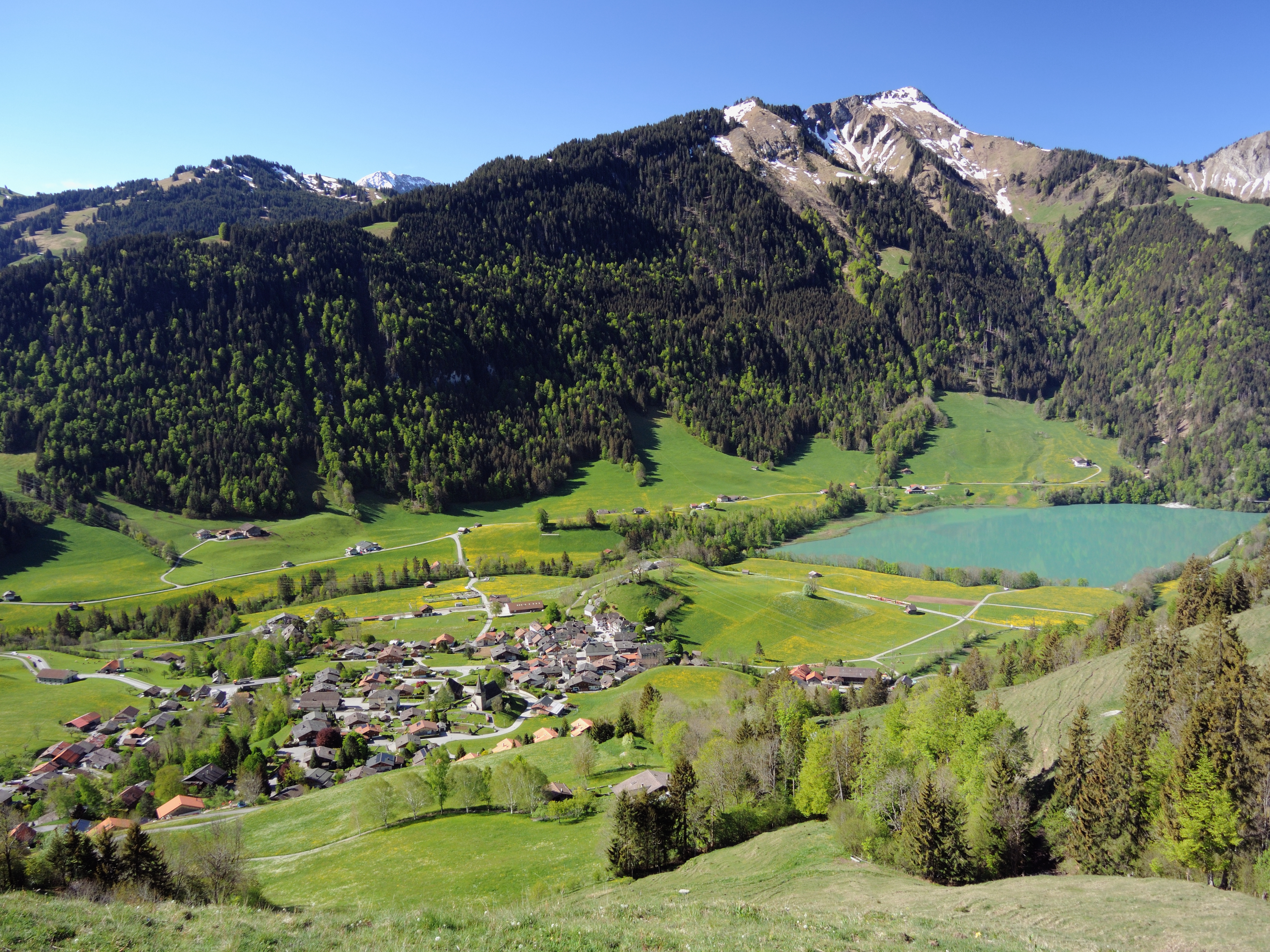
Rossinière village with Lac du Vernex and Planachaux

Aerial view (1964)

Rossinière has an area, as of 2009, of 23.4 square kilometers (9.0 mi^{2}). Of this area, 8.92 km^{2} (3.44 mi^{2}) or 38.2% is used for agricultural purposes, while 11.59 km^{2} (4.47 mi^{2}) or 49.6% is forested. Of the rest of the land, 0.63 km^{2} (0.24 mi^{2}) or 2.7% is settled (buildings or roads), 0.39 km^{2} (0.15 mi^{2}) or 1.7% is either rivers or lakes and 1.83 km^{2} (0.71 mi^{2}) or 7.8% is unproductive land.

Of the built up area, housing and buildings made up 0.8% and transportation infrastructure made up 1.7%. Out of the forested land, 43.2% of the total land area is heavily forested and 3.9% is covered with orchards or small clusters of trees. Of the agricultural land, 0.2% is used for growing crops and 10.5% is pastures and 27.5% is used for alpine pastures. Of the water in the municipality, 1.1% is in lakes and 0.6% is in rivers and streams. Of the unproductive areas, 6.0% is unproductive vegetation and 1.8% is too rocky for vegetation.

The municipality was part of the Pays-d'Enhaut District until it was dissolved on 31 August 2006, and Rossinière became part of the new district of Riviera-Pays-d'Enhaut.

The municipality is located near the Saane/Sarine river, at the foot of the Pointe de Cray (a buttress of the Vanil Noir range) and facing the Planachaux mountain. It consists of the village of Rossinière and the hamlet of La Tine and scattered individual houses. In 1702, the hamlet of Cuves was threatened by the Saane river. It was moved to higher ground and renamed La Tine. A dam on the Saane river forms Lac du Vernex.

== Demographics ==
Rossinière has a population (as of December 2020) of 534. As of 2008, 13.2% of the population are resident foreign nationals. Over the last 10 years (1999–2009) the population has changed at a rate of 1.4%. It has changed at a rate of 4.5% due to migration and at a rate of -3% due to births and deaths.

Most of the population (as of 2000) speaks French (453 or 89.3%), with German being second most common (22 or 4.3%) and Albanian being third (14 or 2.8%). There is 1 person who speaks Italian.

The age distribution, as of 2009, in Rossinière is; 57 children or 11.4% of the population are between 0 and 9 years old and 54 teenagers or 10.8% are between 10 and 19. Of the adult population, 60 people or 12.0% of the population are between 20 and 29 years old. 59 people or 11.8% are between 30 and 39, 68 people or 13.6% are between 40 and 49, and 81 people or 16.2% are between 50 and 59. The senior population distribution is 63 people or 12.6% of the population are between 60 and 69 years old, 35 people or 7.0% are between 70 and 79, there are 19 people or 3.8% who are between 80 and 89, and there are 5 people or 1.0% who are 90 and older.

As of 2000, there were 213 people who were single and never married in the municipality. There were 229 married individuals, 39 widows or widowers and 26 individuals who are divorced.

As of 2000, there were 190 private households in the municipality, and an average of 2.5 persons per household. There were 58 households that consist of only one person and 26 households with five or more people. Out of a total of 198 households that answered this question, 29.3% were households made up of just one person and there were 3 adults who lived with their parents. Of the rest of the households, there are 51 married couples without children, 65 married couples with children There were 7 single parents with a child or children. There were 6 households that were made up of unrelated people and 8 households that were made up of some sort of institution or another collective housing.

In 2000 there were 135 single family homes (or 61.9% of the total) out of a total of 218 inhabited buildings. There were 36 multi-family buildings (16.5%), along with 39 multi-purpose buildings that were mostly used for housing (17.9%) and 8 other use buildings (commercial or industrial) that also had some housing (3.7%).

In 2000, a total of 186 apartments (63.3% of the total) were permanently occupied, while 81 apartments (27.6%) were seasonally occupied and 27 apartments (9.2%) were empty. As of 2009, the construction rate of new housing units was 0 new units per 1000 residents. The vacancy rate for the municipality, in 2010, was 0%.

The historical population is given in the following chart:

== Heritage sites of national significance ==
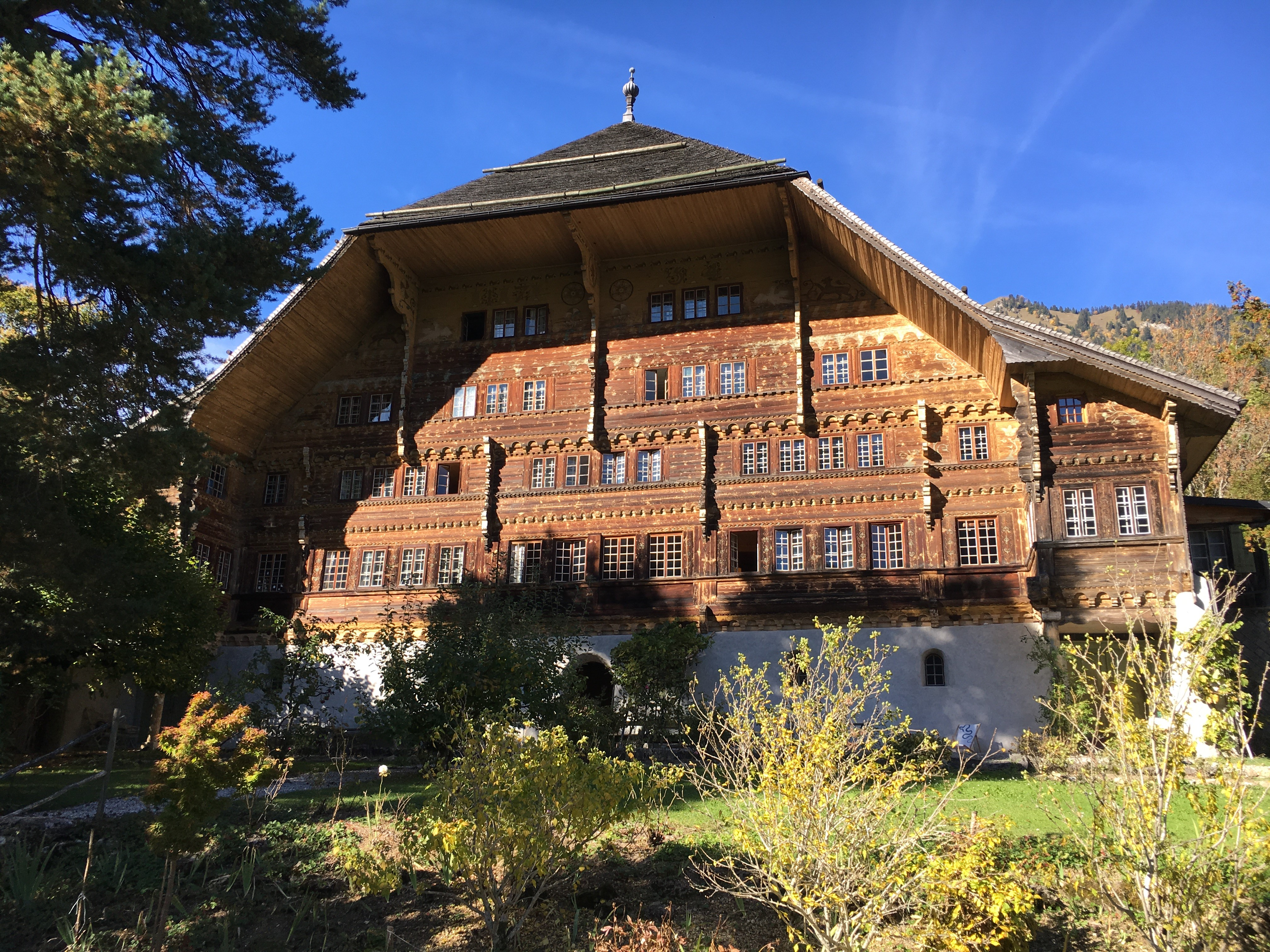
Grand Chalet, south façade

The La Maison De La Place and the Grand Chalet are listed as Swiss heritage sites of national significance. The entire village of Rossinière is part of the Inventory of Swiss Heritage Sites.

== Politics ==
In the 2007 federal election the most popular party was the SVP which received 22.68% of the vote. The next three most popular parties were the FDP (22.07%), the SP (21.03%) and the Green Party (13.11%). In the federal election, a total of 143 votes were cast, and the voter turnout was 41.2%.

== Economy ==
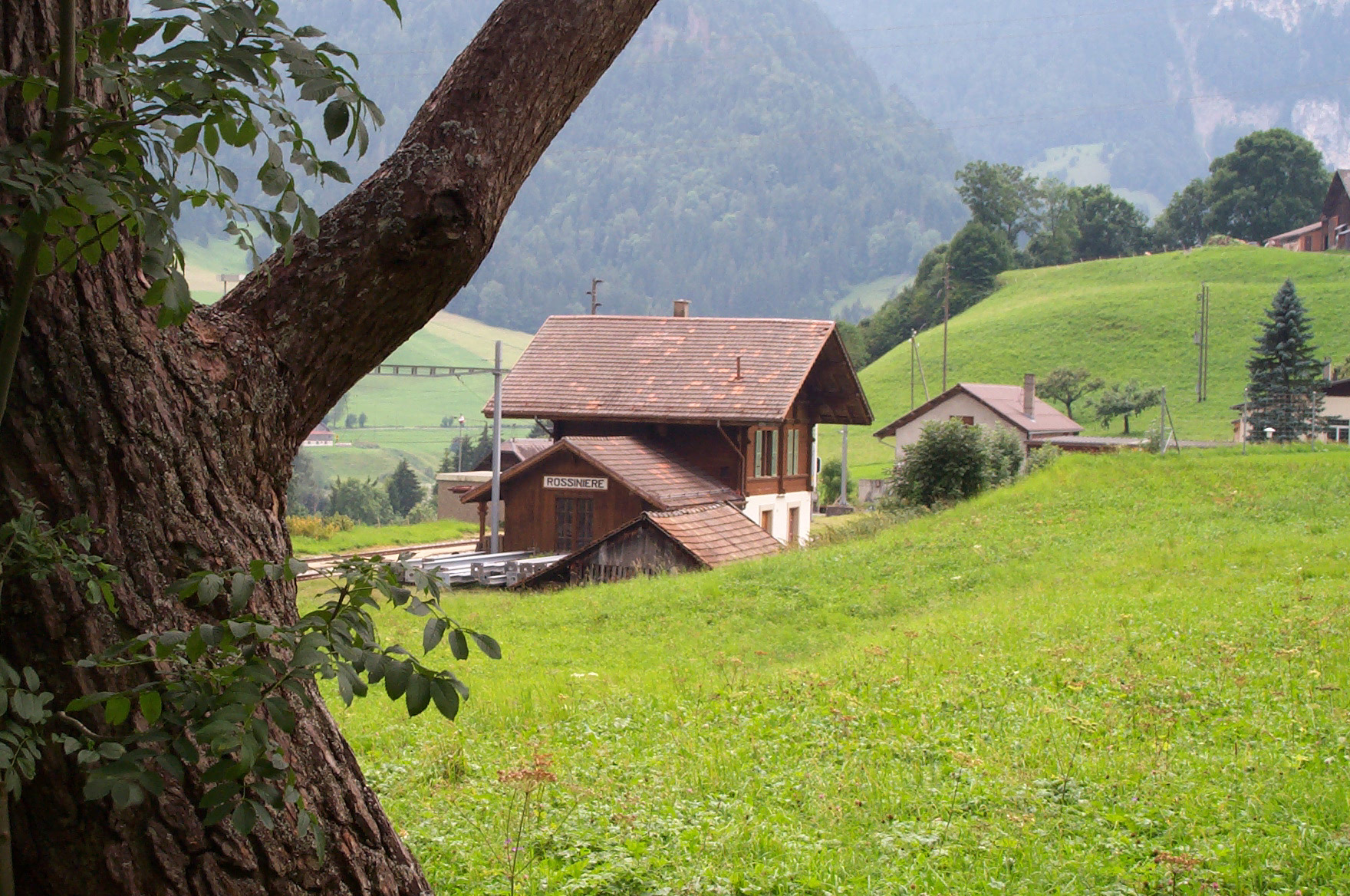
Train station on the Montreux–Lenk im Simmental line

As of 2010, Rossinière had an unemployment rate of 1.7%. As of 2008, there were 44 people employed in the primary economic sector and about 13 businesses involved in this sector. 43 people were employed in the secondary sector and there were 11 businesses in this sector. 100 people were employed in the tertiary sector, with 22 businesses in this sector. There were 227 residents of the municipality who were employed in some capacity, of which females made up 47.6% of the workforce.

In 2008 the total number of full-time equivalent jobs was 146. The number of jobs in the primary sector was 29, all of which were in agriculture. The number of jobs in the secondary sector was 39 of which 26 or (66.7%) were in manufacturing and 13 (33.3%) were in construction. The number of jobs in the tertiary sector was 78. In the tertiary sector; 7 or 9.0% were in wholesale or retail sales or the repair of motor vehicles, 3 or 3.8% were in the movement and storage of goods, 9 or 11.5% were in a hotel or restaurant, 1 was in the information industry, 8 or 10.3% were technical professionals or scientists, 3 or 3.8% were in education and 33 or 42.3% were in health care.

In 2000, there were 35 workers who commuted into the municipality and 122 workers who commuted away. The municipality is a net exporter of workers, with about 3.5 workers leaving the municipality for every one entering. Of the working population, 6.2% used public transportation to get to work, and 59.5% used a private car.

== Religion ==
From the 2000 census, 51 or 10.1% were Roman Catholic, while 317 or 62.5% belonged to the Swiss Reformed Church. Of the rest of the population, there were 4 members of an Orthodox church (or about 0.79% of the population), there was 1 individual who belongs to the Christian Catholic Church, and there were 106 individuals (or about 20.91% of the population) who belonged to another Christian church. There were 28 (or about 5.52% of the population) who were Islamic. 34 (or about 6.71% of the population) belonged to no church, are agnostic or atheist, and 18 individuals (or about 3.55% of the population) did not answer the question.

== Education ==
In Rossinière about 160 or (31.6%) of the population have completed non-mandatory upper secondary education, and 42 or (8.3%) have completed additional higher education (either university or a Fachhochschule). Of the 42 who completed tertiary schooling, 54.8% were Swiss men, 31.0% were Swiss women.

In the 2009/2010 school year there were a total of 44 students in the Rossinière school district. In the Vaud cantonal school system, two years of non-obligatory pre-school are provided by the political districts. During the school year, the political district provided pre-school care for a total of 817 children of which 456 children (55.8%) received subsidized pre-school care. The canton's primary school program requires students to attend for four years. There were 24 students in the municipal primary school program. The obligatory lower secondary school program lasts for six years and there were 18 students in those schools. There were also 2 students who were home schooled or attended another non-traditional school.

As of 2000, there were 6 students in Rossinière who came from another municipality, while 70 residents attended schools outside the municipality.

== Literature and Media ==
The 1950 children's book Treasures of the Snow by Patricia St. John, and its 1983 Japanese anime adaption, Story of the Alps: My Annette, were set in Rossinière.

== Notable residents ==
It was the home of the artist Balthus during the latter part of his life.
