= Planachaux =

Mountain in Switzerland

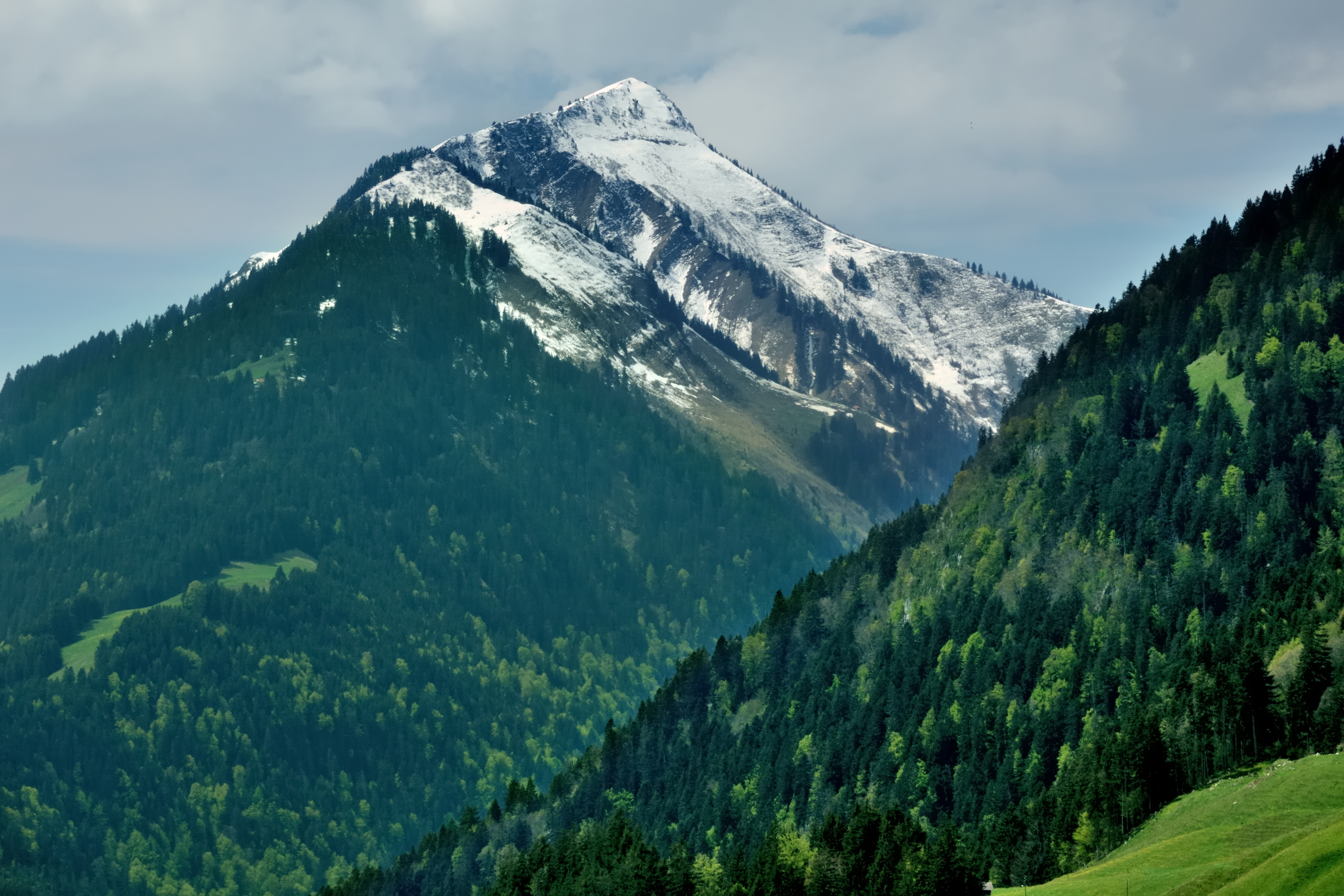
- View from the east

Highest point
- Elevation: 1,925 m (6,316 ft)
- Prominence: 287 m (942 ft)
- Parent peak: Dent de Corjon
- Coordinates: 46°26′39″N 07°03′17″E

Geography
- Location within Switzerland
- Location: Vaud, Switzerland
- Parent range: Swiss Prealps

The Planachaux (1,925 metres (6,316 ft)) is a mountain of the Swiss Prealps, located south of Rossinière in the canton of Vaud. It overlooks the Lac de l'Hongrin on its south side.
