= Montbovon =

Former municipality, canton of Fribourg

- Former municipality
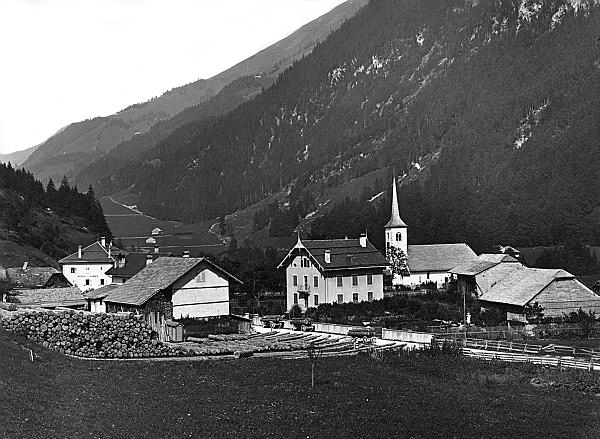
- Village and church, 1885–1900

- Coat of arms
- Location of Montbovon
- Location within Switzerland Location within Canton of Fribourg
- Coordinates: 46.48722°N 7.04278°E
- Country: Switzerland
- Canton: Fribourg
- District: Gruyère
- Municipality: Haut-Intyamon

Population (2000)
  - Total: 252
- Time zone: UTC+01:00 (CET)
  - Summer (DST): UTC+02:00 (CEST)
- ISO 3166 code: CH-FR
- Website

Montbovon (old German name Bubenberg) is a former municipality in the Gruyère district of the canton of Fribourg, Switzerland. In 2002 it merged with Albeuve, Lessoc and Neirivue to form the municipality of Haut-Intyamon. Its territory comprised several hamlets at 800 to 1,000 meters (2,600 to 3,300 ft), which arose from late settlement: Allières, Vers-les-Pichon, Vers-les-Jordan, Vers-les-Moret, Comba d'Avau and Comba d'Amont.

== History ==
Montbovon is first mentioned in 1255 as Montebovonis and Mons bovonis. The village lies on the old main road from Bulle to Château-d'Œx, on the left bank of the Sarine, and at the starting point of the route over the Col de Jaman. Part of the county of Gruyère in the Middle Ages, Montbovon came under Fribourg rule and was incorporated into the bailiwick of Gruyère (1555–1798) and then into the district of Gruyère (1798–1848).

Montbovon belonged to the parish of Bulle and then to that of Albeuve (1228), from which it separated in 1618. A chapel of Saint Gratus (1516) was replaced by the parish church (1621); the present building dates from 1897 and was restored in 1997. The chapel of Saint Mary Magdalene at Allières (1721) was destroyed by a mudslide in 1990 and rebuilt in 1995. Several old bridges over the Sarine and the Hongrin date from the 17th to the 19th century.

In the 19th century agriculture was supplemented by the wood industry and straw plaiting. The hydroelectric power station founded in 1896 (enlarged in 1899, with its dam raised in 1969–1971) powered various industries (a carbide factory, a tannery, a foundry), none of which managed to establish itself. The Châtel-Saint-Denis–Bulle–Montbovon and Montreux–Oberland Bernois railway lines date from 1903. A holiday resort since the 19th century (Hôtel de Jaman in 1854, Hôtel de la Gare in 1904), Montbovon moved toward nature-based tourism in the 20th century. A dairy society was founded in 1912. In 2000 there were ten livestock farms.

Montbovon had 389 inhabitants in 1811, 387 in 1850, 611 in 1900, 483 in 1950 and 252 in 2000. In 2002 it merged with Albeuve, Lessoc and Neirivue to form Haut-Intyamon.

== Bibliography ==
- Entreprises électriques fribourgeoises, 1914, pp. 1–31
- J.-P. Anderegg, La maison paysanne fribourgeoise, vol. 2, 1987, pp. 35–36, 60, 466–467
- P. Delacrétaz, Fribourg jette ses ponts, 1990, pp. 105–107
- A. Lauper and M.-Th. Torche-Julmy, "L'église de Montbovon restaurée", in Patrimoine fribourgeois, 8, 1997, pp. 61–65
- J.-P. Anderegg, Une histoire du paysage fribourgeois, 2002, pp. 181–183
