= Dent de Corjon =

Mountain in Switzerland

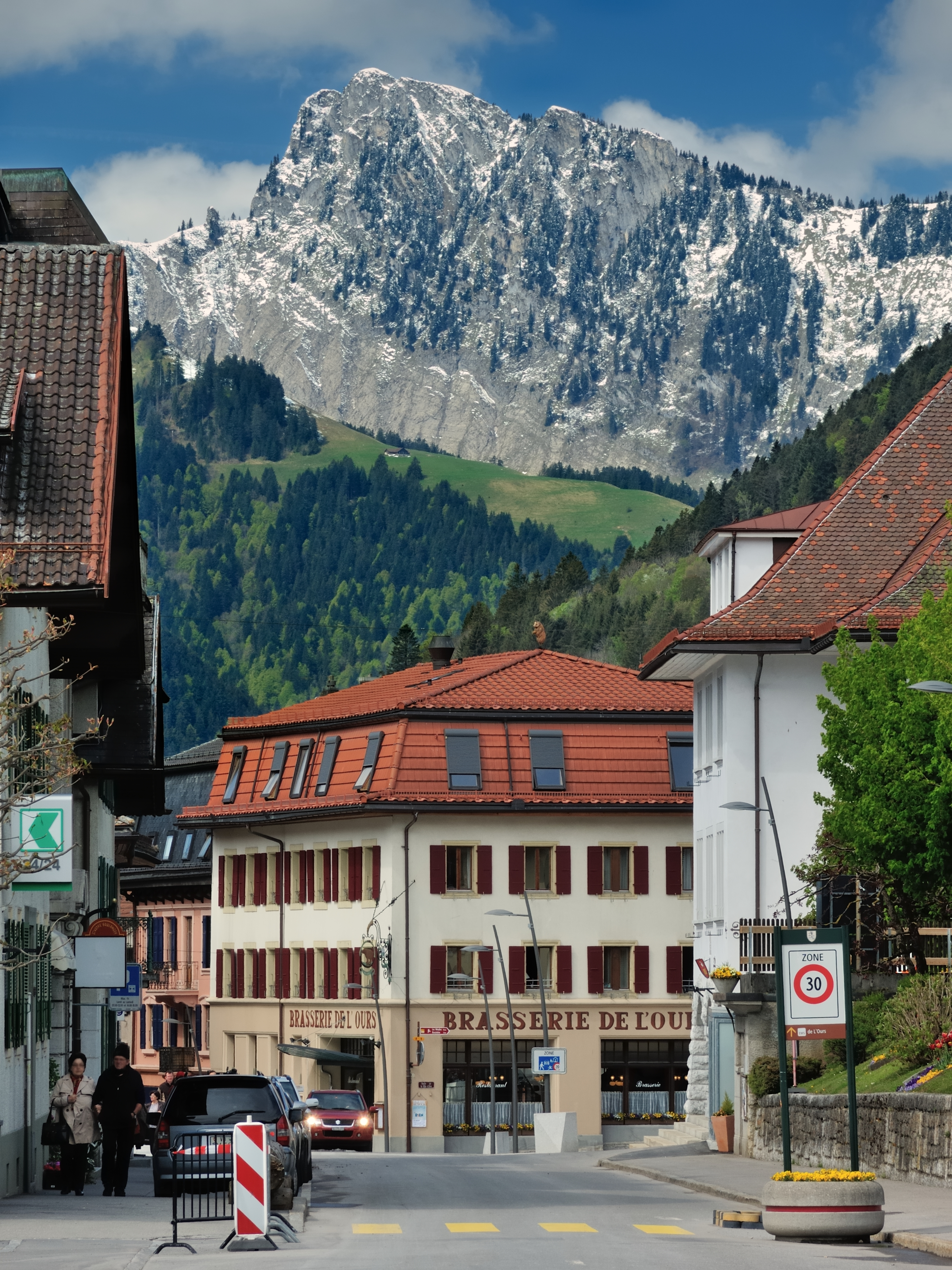
- The east face from Château-d'Oex

Highest point
- Elevation: 1,967 m (6,453 ft)
- Prominence: 579 m (1,900 ft)
- Coordinates: 46°27′0″N 7°2′9″E

Geography
- Location within Switzerland
- Location: Vaud, Switzerland
- Parent range: Swiss Prealps

The Dent de Corjon (1,967 m) is a mountain of the Swiss Prealps, located west of Rossinière in the canton of Vaud. It is the culminating point of the small range lying between the valley of L'Hongrin and the Sarine, north of the Lac de l'Hongrin.
