= Patricia St. John =

English religious writer and missionary

Patricia Mary St. John
- Born: 5 April 1919; Southampton, England
- Died: 15 August 1993 (aged 74); England
- Occupations: Writer, missionary nurse

Patricia Mary St. John (5 April 1919 – 15 August 1993) was a British evangelical writer and missionary. She was one of the most prolific evangelical writers of fiction in the latter part of the 20th century. She worked for much of her life as a missionary nurse in Morocco. During her time as a house mother at Clarendon School for Girls, which was run by her aunt, she wrote Treasures of the Snow and The Tanglewoods' Secret. Her later novels, Star of Light and Secret of the Fourth Candle, were based on her experiences in Tangiers. She lived for some years until her death in Canley, Coventry in 1993.

== Early years ==
The third of five children, Patricia was born on 5 April 1919 in Southampton, England, to Harold (Harry) and Ella St. John nee Swain, shortly after her parents' return from South America (Carangola, Brazil) where they had worked as missionaries.

== Mission work ==
After completing her school education, Patricia trained to become a nurse during World War II. After the war ended she became a house mother at her aunt's boarding school, Clarendon School for Girls, until joining her older brother, Farnham, in Tangiers, Morocco, where he was a missionary doctor after qualifying at the University of Cambridge in 1944. A newspaper interview published in the Coventry Evening Telegraph on 24 October 1978, says that her writings - poetry and children's stories - had already earned her some money, so she financed herself while helping her brother. Although initially working with Farnham in the main foreign hospital in Tangier, she later spent five years working at a village clinic in Xauen, or Chaouen, in a more remote area on the coast of Morocco. Eventually, she returned to Tangiers, spending 27 years working as a missionary nurse overseas.

== Writing ==
From her memories of a year lived in Alpine Switzerland she wrote her second book, Treasures of the Snow.

St. John was one of the most prolific British Protestant evangelical writers of fiction in the latter part of the 20th century. Treasures of the Snow (1980-3) and The Tanglewoods' Secret (1980) have been produced as films.

Treasures of the Snow was translated into Afrikaans.

== Later years ==
St. John lived her later years in Canley, Coventry, where she worshipped at Canley Evangelical Church and ran children's Bible classes. She died in Canley on 16 August 1993 as a result of heart problems.

== Books ==
=== Biographical ===
- Man of Two Worlds: The Life of Ken Moynagh, Henry E. Walter Ltd (1976)
- R. Hudson Pope: A Biography, Patricia M. St John, Scripture Union (1967) (biography of R. Hudson Pope)
- Until the Day Breaks: The Life and Work of Lilias Trotter, Pioneer Missionary to Muslim North Africa, OM Publishing (1990) (biography of Lilias Trotter)
- Harold St. John, Loizeaux Brothers, 2d end edition (1962) (biography of her father)
- Patricia St. John Tells Her Own Story, OM Publishing (1995) (also published as An Ordinary Woman's Extraordinary Faith, and most recently as In Her Words)

=== Fiction ===
- The Tanglewoods' Secret, Scripture Union (1967, first published 1948)
- Treasures of the Snow, Scripture Union Publishing (September 1980, first published 1950)
- Star of Light, Moody Press (July 1995, first published 1953)
- Rainbow Garden, Moody Press (July 1995, first published 1960)
- The Mystery of Pheasant Cottage, Moody Press (July 1995)
- Where the River Begins, Victor Books (March 1987)
- Three Go Searching, Moody Press, (July 1995) (also published as The Secret Boat, Marshall Pickering, November 1982)
- The Secret of the Fourth Candle, Moody Press (June 1981)
- Stories to Share, Shaw (7 March 2000)
- Nothing Else Matters, Scripture Union (May 2007) (also published as If You Love Me: A Story of Forgiveness)
- The Runaway, Moody Publishers (8 February 1985) (also published as The Victor)
- I Needed a Neighbour, Scripture Union Publishing (September 1987) (also published as A Courageous Journey)
- Twice Freed, Moody Publishers (1 January 1987) (historical fiction)
- Friska My Friend, Scripture Union (1983, revised 2007, reprinted 2011)

=== Miscellaneous ===
- Verses London: CSSM (1953)
- Breath of Life: The Story of the Ruanda Mission, London: Norfolk Press (1971)
- Would You Believe It? – You Can Grow to Know God, Marshall Pickering (August 1983)
- Prayer Is an Adventure, Christian Focus Publications (March 2004)
- Missing the Way: They Could Not Enter In (How Israel Missed God's Rest), Harvey Christian Publishers (1999)
- A Missionary Muses on the Creed, Pickering and Inglis (1966) (also published as Life Everlasting)
- Young Person's Guide to Knowing God, Christian Focus (2000, originally published in 1983 by Pickering and Inglis)
