= Shanin =

Shanin may refer to:

- Shanin, Qazvin, village in the Iranian province of Qazvin
- Nikolai Aleksandrovich Shanin (1919 – 2011), Russian mathematician
- Teodor Shanin (1930 – 2020), British sociologist, founder of the Moscow School for the Social and Economic Sciences
- Shanin Blake (born 1994), American pop singer, artist, influencer and model
