= Ken Moynagh =

Ken Moynagh is/was a British medical missionary to Rwanda.
