= Treasures of the Snow =

1950 novel by Patricia St. John

- First edition
- Author: Patricia St. John
- Illustrator: L. F. Lupton
- Language: English
- Genre: Children's literature, Christian novel
- Publisher: CSSM
- Publication date: 1950
- Publication place: United Kingdom
- Media type: Print (hardcover)
- Pages: 222
- Dewey Decimal: 823.91

Treasures of the Snow is a children's novel by Patricia St. John. Originally published by CSSM in 1950, it has been reprinted over a dozen times by various publishers, including braille versions published by the Royal National Institute for the Blind in 1959 and by the Queensland Braille Writing Association in 1996. The book is still in print today.

Over the years it has been translated into and published in many languages, including French, Hungarian, Finnish, Danish, Chinese, Czech, German, Greek, Italian, Vietnamese, Korean, Mari, Faroese, Polish, Welsh, Serbian, Bosnian, Romanian and Russian. An audiobook version in English was produced by Blackstone Audio in October 2005, available in CD, MP3 and audio cassette formats.

== Background ==
Treasures of the Snow was Patricia St. John's second book, started soon after the end of World War II. The theme was forgiveness – as she wrote in her autobiography: "The world was settling down after the war, but as the atrocities came to light there was so much anger and hatred. I remembered the boys coming back from the war to wives who had proved unfaithful. I remembered the faces of those who had seen the first photographic exhibition of the horrors of Belsen and the state of the bombed cities of Europe; the resentment of those who could not forgive others, the remorse of those who could not forgive themselves, and I knew that this generation of children needed, above all things, to learn the meaning of forgiveness".

The story is set in Switzerland, where the author spent some time as a child, and is written for children aged eight and above. The narrative is centred on three children, and explores love, hatred, death, disability, repentance, self-sacrifice, forgiveness and reconciliation. Woven through the story runs a frank description of the children's thoughts, motives, struggles, feelings and fears as well as their prayers and their developing Christian faith.

== Plot summary ==
Annette Burnier lives with her father, elderly grandmother and young brother Dani in a small village in the Swiss mountains. When she is eight years old her mother dies just after Dani's birth, and since the family is too poor to afford a nanny, Annette takes the responsibility upon herself, arranging with the schoolmaster to study at home under her grandmother's guidance. When Dani is old enough for her to return to school, she does well and often gains top marks. On Dani's fifth Christmas, he puts his slipper outside in the snow, hoping that Father Christmas will bring him a present. In the morning, to everyone's astonishment, a tiny white kitten has snuggled into the slipper. Dani calls him Klaus and the two become inseparable.

Further up the mountain in the next chalet, Annette's classmate Lucien Morel lives with his elder sister Marie and their widowed mother. Lucien finds schoolwork difficult and is frustrated that he is often bottom of the class. He also resents having to help around the home and farm with all the tasks that his father would have done, and his mother and sister criticise his laziness.

Conflict flares one day when Lucien is sledging down to school and accidentally collides with Annette's sledge, throwing her into a ditch full of snow. Out of resentment at her success in school, he does not stop to help her, but speeds off to school instead. When she arrives late, cold, wet and grazed, with torn wet books, Annette has to explain what happened. Lucien is caned by the schoolmaster, and ostracised by the rest of the class. While on his way home he vents his frustration by kicking over a snowman Dani has built, causing Annette to run out and slap his face and shout angrily at him.

Lucien's increasing loneliness and festering hurt is directed at Annette and he looks for opportunities for revenge. When he sees Dani in a meadow picking flowers for Annette's birthday one day, he grabs the flowers and tramples on them. Then, afraid Dani would get him into trouble, he picks up Klaus and holds him out over a deep ravine, threatening (but not intending) to drop the kitten unless Dani promises not to tell. Klaus, however, scratches Lucien, and he lets go by accident. Dani rushes across and falls over the cliff into the ravine while trying to save his kitten. Lucien is terrified and griefstricken, convinced that Dani is dead, and flees home to hide in the barn, unable to face his family. When the worried families find Lucien, he confesses what had happened. Dani's father uses a rope to climb down the ravine and finds Dani still alive at the bottom, but with a broken leg. Dani's leg heals badly, shorter than the other leg, leaving him permanently unable to walk without crutches.

The whole village hears about Lucien's involvement with Dani's accident, and he becomes an outcast. Working hard around the home and farm helps him stop brooding for a while, and his mother praises him for this while his sister becomes kinder to him. But his real solace is to climb to the woods and spend time alone, carving little figures out of wood, which he finds he has a real talent for. Here he meets and makes friends with an old man who lives alone in a tiny chalet high above the village, whose only income comes from selling his own woodcarvings. He mentors Lucien and lets him use his woodcarving tools, helping him improve his skills. He also confides in Lucien his life story. As a young man he had been happily married with two young sons and a good job in a bank, but then got into bad company and became addicted to alcohol and gambling. To pay the family's debts he stole from the bank and ended up in prison. His wife died, but his sons were adopted by their grandparents and became very successful. When he got out of prison, he did not want his sons' futures jeopardised by being associated with a criminal, so let them assume he was dead. He had lived alone on the mountain for many years and saved a lot of money from the beautiful woodcarvings he sold, similar to the amount he had stolen. He could not repay the people he had stolen from, since he did not know who they were, but his hope was that instead he might be able to use the money to help someone in need.

Lucien is constantly burdened by the guilt of what he had done to Dani, but Annette's hatred towards him makes it impossible for him to do anything to try and right it. He carves a Noah's Ark full of little animals for Dani, but Annette simply throws it on the woodpile when he tries to deliver it. Lucien also decides to enter one of his carvings for the hand-craft competition at school, but shortly before the competition Annette secretly smashes the carved horse out of spite, and goes on to win the girls' competition herself. Because of their guilt and bitterness, neither Annette nor Lucien can find peace of mind or happiness.

Then one night Annette goes out for a walk alone, slips on ice and sprains her ankle very badly. She struggles to the nearest chalet but the owners are away. Unable to walk, she finds herself in danger of freezing to death. To her relief Lucien skis past while on his way home from visiting his old friend. She calls for help and he gives her his cloak while he goes home to fetch a sledge. When he returns, Annette confesses to him about breaking his carved horse, but instead of being angry Lucien forgives her and feels relieved that he is not the only person to have done hurtful things out of spite. He takes her on his sledge to her chalet, where he is invited in. Later Annette confesses to the schoolmaster, and they agree that he should present her prize to Lucien.

The enmity is over, but Lucien still feels troubled with guilt about Dani's disability. One evening Lucien's sister, who commutes by train to work in a hotel in the nearest town, comes home with a generous tip from a famous orthopaedic surgeon, Monsieur Givet, who is staying at the hotel. Lucien asks excitedly whether he can make Dani better, but is told the doctor is leaving the hotel for home early the next morning, and anyway his fees would be far too expensive. Undeterred, Lucien creeps out of the house that night in a blizzard and goes to talk with his friend the old man, telling him about Monsieur Givet and that he might be able to cure Dani. The old man gives Lucien a sock full of banknotes to pay for the treatment, but makes him promise to not tell the doctor where the money was obtained, telling Lucien, "Just tell him that it is the payment of a debt." Lucien attempts to climb and ski to the town, which involves crossing a high mountain pass. Despite the atrocious weather he reaches the hotel about 5 am. Monsieur Givet goes with Lucien to visit Dani, and offers to treat him in his hospital. But before he leaves the village, he asks Lucien's sister where the old man lives that Lucien knows, and goes to visit him. He recognises the old man as his father, tells him how much he has missed him, and invites him to come home.

Annette goes with Dani to stay in the hospital. His fractured leg is re-broken and set properly, and Dani returns home able to walk and run like any little boy. Everybody is reunited with each other as spring arrives.

== Adaptations ==
A film Treasures of the Snow, written and directed by Mike Pritchard and based on the book was filmed in Switzerland and released in 1980. He also adapted Tanglewood's Secret.

A Japanese anime series, based on the book and entitled Story of the Alps: My Annette (アルプス物語 わたしのアンネット), was produced in 1983 by Kōzō Kusuba at Nippon Animation and has been broadcast in 48 weekly episodes in Japan, France, Spain, Italy, Germany, Austria, Hungary, Arab World, Poland, Iran and the Philippines.

A stage version, adapted by Barbara Solly, was published in Bristol around 1980.
