= Sanetschhore =

Mountain in Switzerland

- German: Sanetschhorn, French: Mont Brun
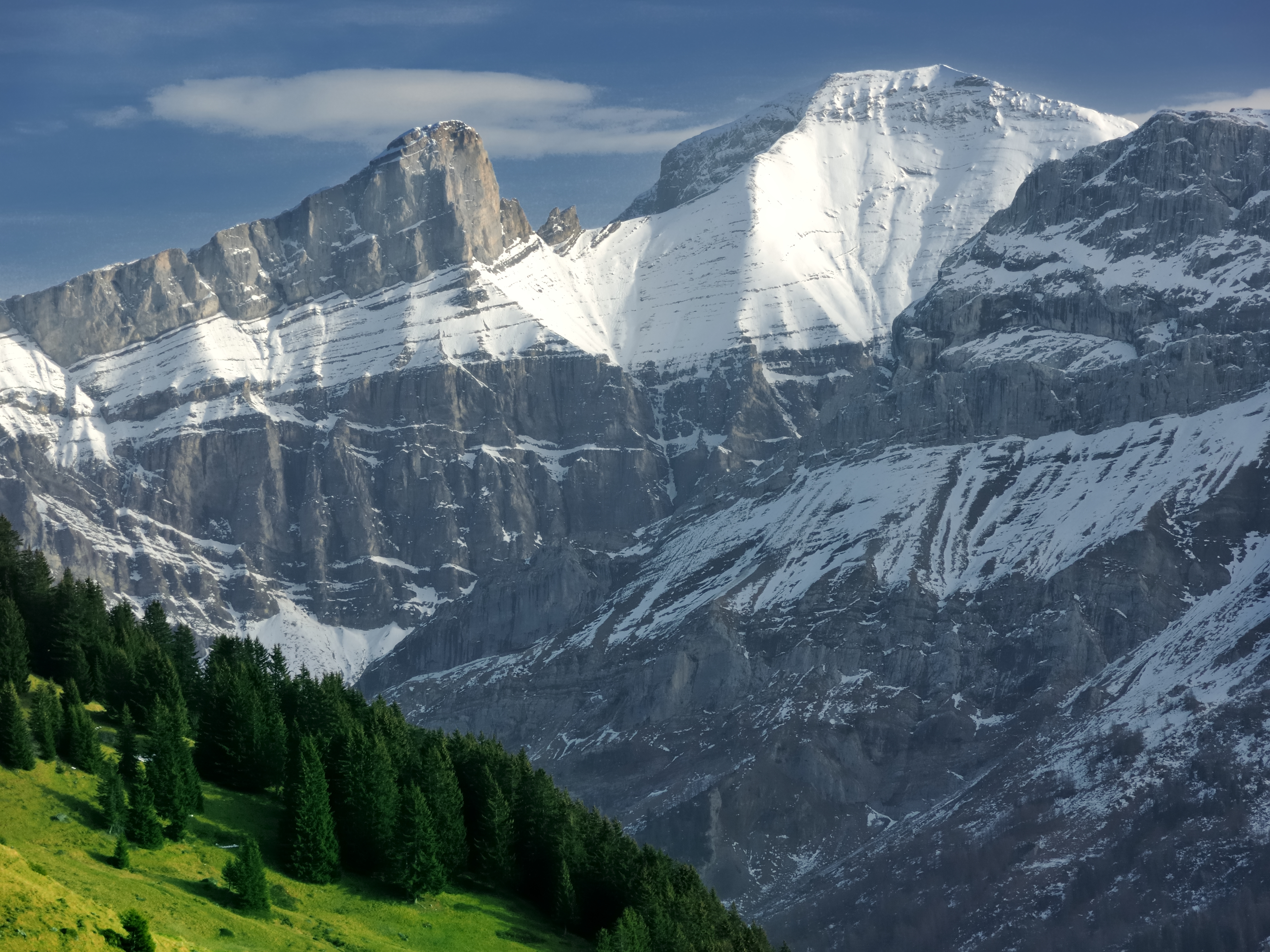
- The Gstellihorn (left) and the Sanetschhorn (right) from above Les Diablerets

Highest point
- Elevation: 2,924 m (9,593 ft)
- Prominence: 225 m (738 ft)
- Parent peak: Diablerets
- Coordinates: 46°20′18.3″N 7°15′45.5″E

Naming
- Native name: Sanetschore (German); Mont Brun (French)

Geography
- Location within Switzerland
- Country: Switzerland
- Cantons: Bern and Valais
- Parent range: Bernese Alps
- Topo map: Swiss Federal Office of Topography swisstopo

The Sanetschhore (Swiss German, Germanized: Sanetschhorn) or Mont Brun in French is a mountain of the Diablerets massif in the Bernese Alps, overlooking the Sanetsch Pass in Switzerland. It is located between the cantons of Valais and Bern northeast of the main summit of the Diablerets.
