= Lac de Sanetsch =

Reservoir in canton of Valais, Switzerland

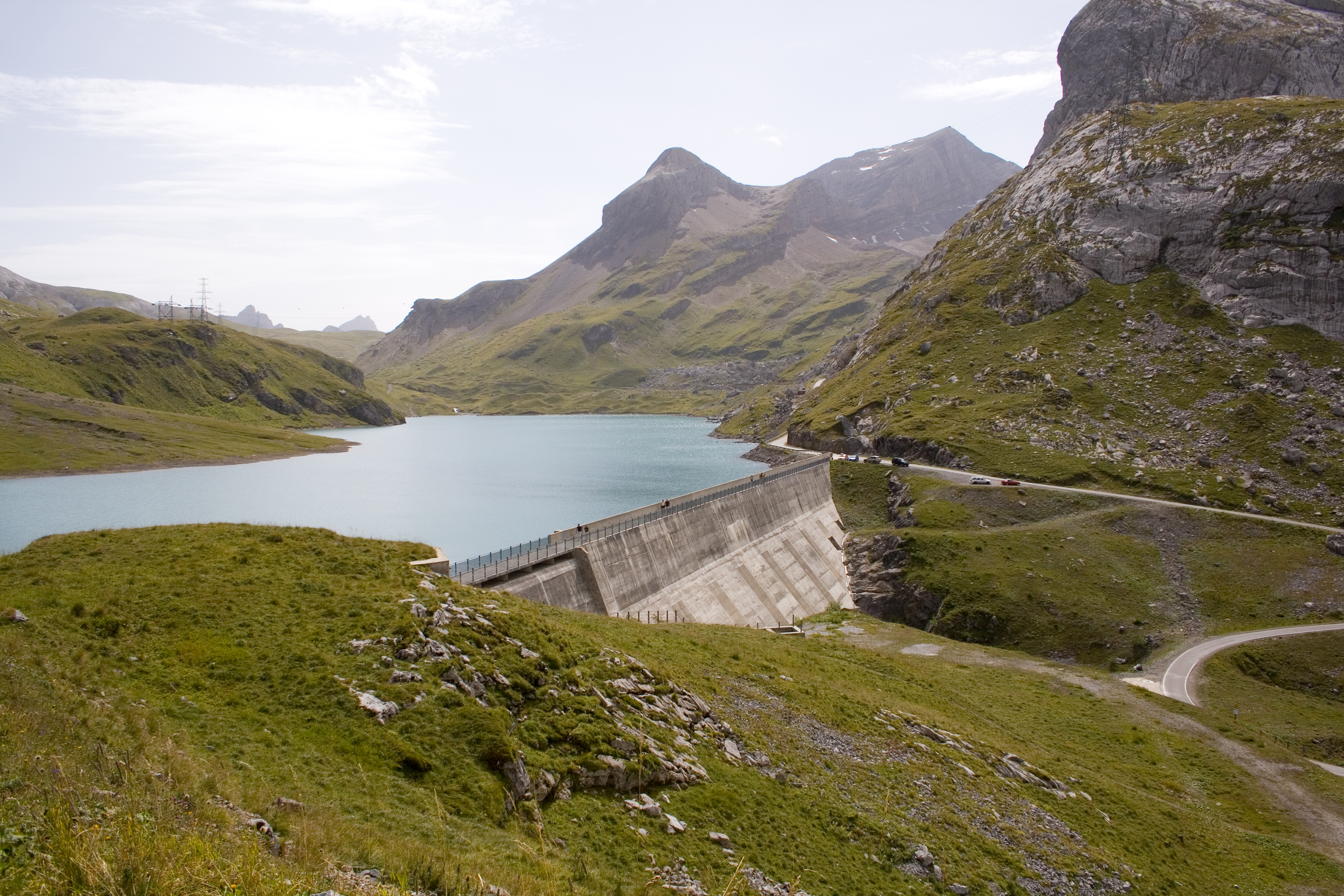

- Location within Canton of Valais Location within Canton of Bern Location within Switzerland Location within Alps
- Interactive map of Lac de Sanetsch
- Location: Gsteig, Valais
- Coordinates: 46°21′27″N 7°17′44″E
- Type: reservoir
- Catchment area: 10.7 km^{2} (4.1 sq mi)
- Basin countries: Switzerland
- Surface area: 29 ha (72 acres)
- Surface elevation: 2,034 m (6,673 ft)

Lac de Sanetsch (also Lac de Sénin, German: Sanetsch See) is a reservoir below Sanetsch Pass in Valais, Switzerland. Its surface area is 29 ha (72 acres). The Sanetsch dam was built in 1965. The gravity dam has a height of 42 metres (138 ft).

== See also ==
- List of mountain lakes of Switzerland
