= Lessoc =

Former municipality, canton of Fribourg

- Former municipality
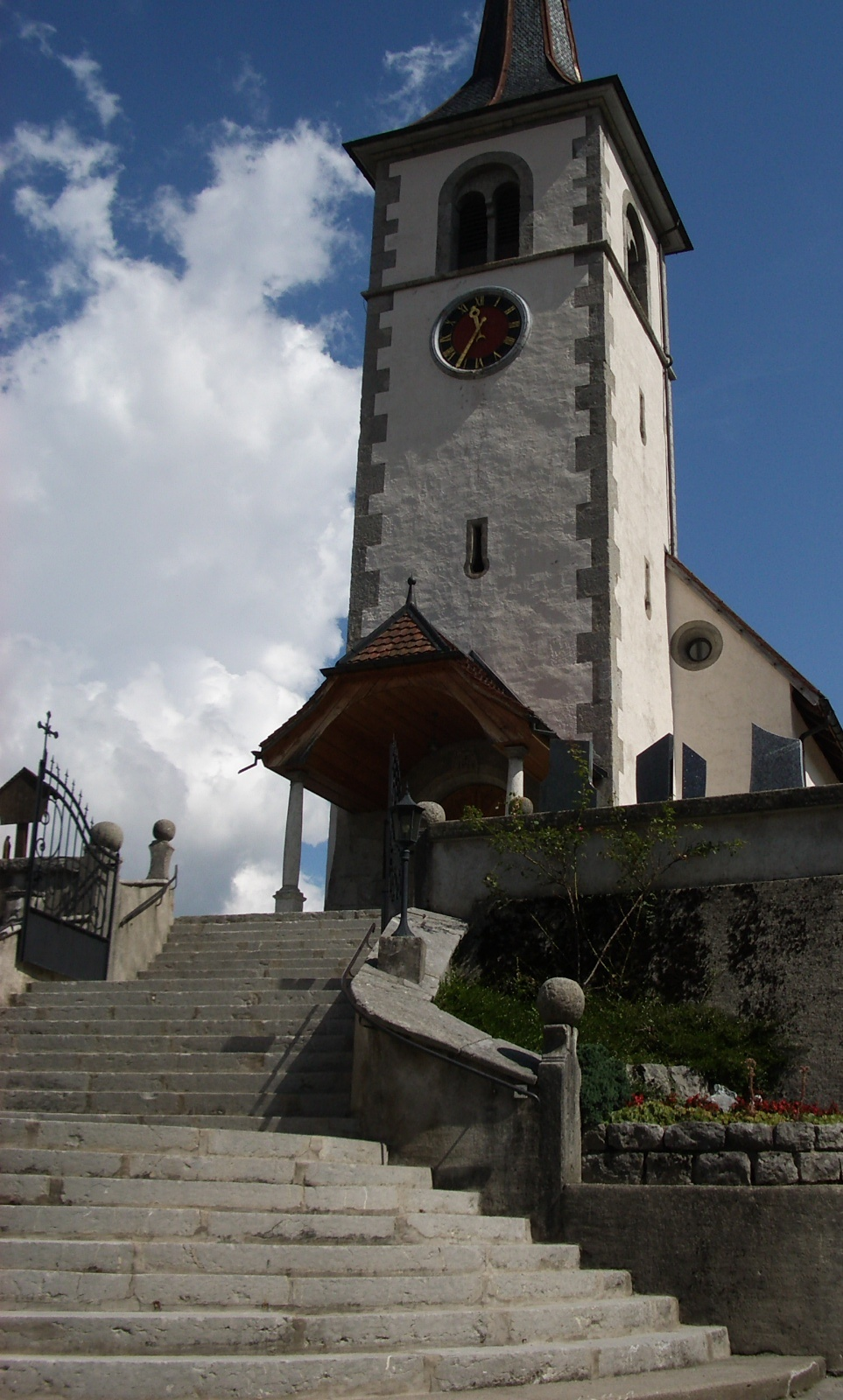
- Parish church

- Coat of arms
- Location of Lessoc
- Location within Switzerland Location within Canton of Fribourg
- Coordinates: 46.50484°N 7.06212°E
- Country: Switzerland
- Canton: Fribourg
- District: Gruyère
- Municipality: Haut-Intyamon

Population (2000)
  - Total: 184
- Time zone: UTC+01:00 (CET)
  - Summer (DST): UTC+02:00 (CEST)
- ISO 3166 code: CH-FR
- Website

Lessoc is a former municipality in the Gruyère district of the canton of Fribourg, Switzerland. In 2002 it merged with Albeuve, Montbovon and Neirivue to form the municipality of Haut-Intyamon. On the right bank of the Sarine, it also included the hamlet of Le Buth.

== History ==
Lessoc is first mentioned in 1231 as Lessoz. In 1278 the lords of Corbières ceded their lands at Lessoc to Pierre II of Gruyère, who placed the village in the banner (bannière) and castellany of Montsalvens. In 1396 Count Rodolphe IV freed his subjects at Lessoc from mainmorte. Lessoc was part of the bailiwick of Gruyères from 1555 while keeping its own jurisdiction, and then belonged to the district of Gruyères (1798–1848).

In church matters, the village passed from the parish of Broc to that of Grandvillard in 1228, and became a parish of its own in 1643. A chapel of Saint Martin, mentioned in 1365, was replaced by the present church, built in the early 17th century and restored in 1993–1994. The chapel of Notre-Dame-des-Neiges at Le Buth dates from 1684, the wooden covered bridge over the Sarine from 1667 and the octagonal covered fountain from 1796. Quarries of tufa and of a veined limestone known as Lessoc "marble" were worked until about 1920. A dam was built on the Sarine in 1969–1973. Lessoc has remained a rural village, with livestock farming and fodder crops.

Lessoc had 232 inhabitants in 1811, 252 in 1850, 331 in 1900, 262 in 1950, 142 in 1980 and 184 in 2000. In 2002 it merged with Albeuve, Montbovon and Neirivue to form Haut-Intyamon.

== Bibliography ==
- A. Dellion, Dictionnaire historique et statistique des paroisses catholiques du canton de Fribourg, vols. 7–8, pp. 273–287
- Pro Fribourg, no. 111, 1996
