= Sanetsch Pass =

High pass in western Bernese Alps, Switzerland

- Col du Sanetsch
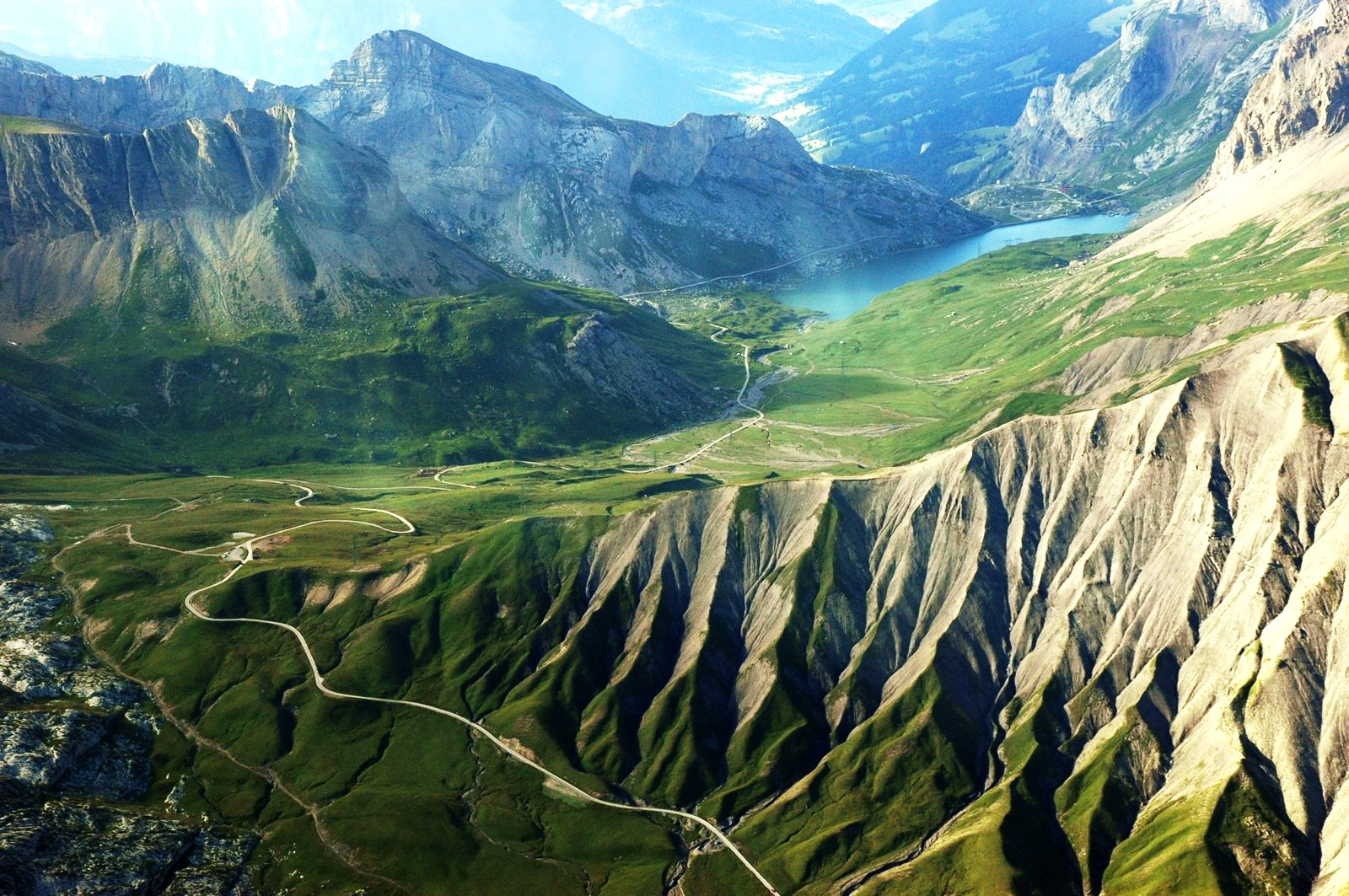
- Aerial view of the pass

- Location within Switzerland
- Elevation: 2,242 metres (7,356 ft)
- Traversed by: Trail (dead end road)

Third Approach
- Location: Valais, Switzerland
- Range: Bernese Alps
- Coordinates: 46°19′49″N 7°17′10″E

Sanetsch Pass (French: Col du Sanetsch or Col de Sénin) (el. 2242 m) is a high mountain pass in Switzerland across the western Bernese Alps, connecting Gsteig in the canton of Bern and Sion in the canton of Valais. Although a road leads to the pass from Sion and goes further to the Lac de Sanetsch, it can not be completely traversed by car. In the summer season the pass is accessible by PostBus and can also be traversed by cable car. The highest point of the road is at 2,252 metres.

The pass itself is located in Valais 4 km south of the border with Bern. It separates the massif of the Diablerets on the west from the massif of the Wildhorn on the east. The Sanetschhorn and the Arpelistock overlook the pass on the west and east side respectively. The Col du Sanetsch is a popular destination because of the view over the Pennine Alps and the nearby Tsanfleuron Glacier.

== See also ==
- List of highest paved roads in Europe
- List of mountain passes
