= Saane/Sarine =

River in Switzerland

Sarine (French) Saane (German)
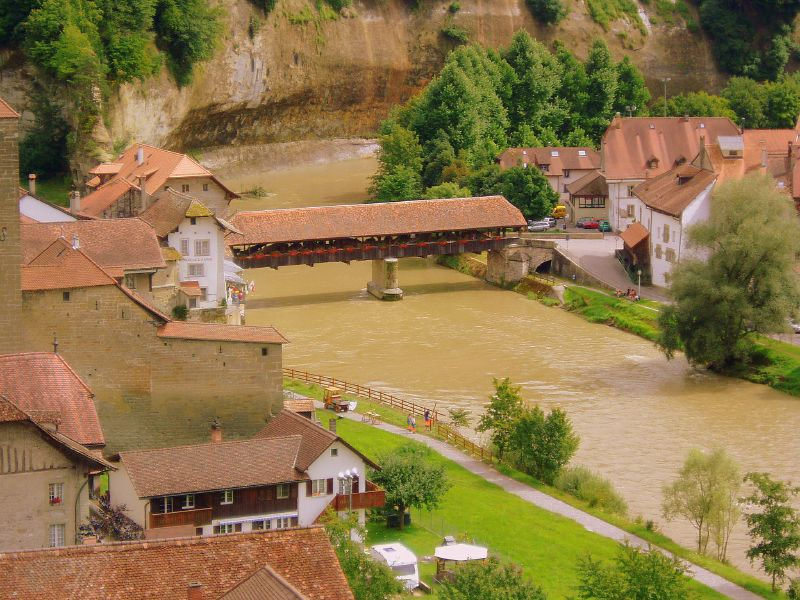
- Pont de Berne (Berner Brücke) over the Sarine/Saane, near Fribourg.
- Native name: Sarena (Arpitan)

Location
- Country: Switzerland

Physical characteristics
- Source
  - location: Between the Sanetschhorn and Col du Sanetsch
  - elevation: 2,308 m (7,572 ft)
- Mouth
  - location: West of Bern, into the Aare
  - elevation: 461 m (1,512 ft)
- Length: 128 km (80 mi)
- Basin size: 1,892 km^{2} (731 sq mi)

Basin features
- Progression: Aare→ Rhine→ North Sea

The Sarine (French: [saʁin]; Arpitan: Sarena [ʃaʁˈnɑ]) or Saane (German: [ˈzaːnə]) is a major river of Switzerland. It is 128 km (80 mi) long and has a drainage area of 1,892 km^{2} (731 sq mi). It is a tributary of the Aare.

The Sarine rises in the Bernese Alps, near Sanetschhorn, in the Canton of Valais. It forms the Lac de Sénin (French; German: Sanetschsee) reservoir at 2034 m, and then enters the Canton of Bern, traversing the Sanetsch falls between 1900 and 1400 m. It then forms the westernmost valley of the Bernese Oberland, flowing past Gsteig, Gstaad and Saanen in the Obersimmental-Saanen district. Downstream of Saanen, at 982 m, it enters the Canton of Vaud, passing Rougemont, Château-d'Œx and Rossinière, forming the Lac du Vernex at 859 m. At 833, it traverses the Creux de l'Enfer and enters the Canton of Fribourg, forming Lac de Montbovon at 777 m.From this point, it more or less follows the linguistic boundary between French- and German-speaking Switzerland across the bilingual canton of Fribourg (and is often identified as the geographic representation of the Röstigraben division of Switzerland). Passing Villars-sous-Mont, Enney, Gruyères and Broc, it reaches Lac de la Gruyère at 677 m. It then continues in serpentines towards Fribourg itself; the historical city was built in 1157 on a peninsula of the Sarine, protected on three sides by steep cliffs. Downstream of Fribourg, it widens into the Schiffenensee reservoir at 532 m (built 1963), and is then taken to Laupen in a channel, where it is joined by the Sense. Flowing north for another 6 km, it finally joins the Aar just downstream of Wohlensee, at 461 m, some 15 km (9.3 mi) west of Bern.

== Reservoirs ==
Reservoirs on the Saane/Sarine river
Dam Location	Elevation	Reservoir	Area	Volume	Length
Rossinière VD	860 m (2,820 ft)	Lac du Vernex	0.32 km^{2} (0.12 sq mi)	002.9 mio m³	1.2 km (0.75 mi)
Lessoc, Haut-Intyamon FR	774 m (2,539 ft)	Lac de Lessoc	0.20 km^{2} (0.077 sq mi)	001.5 mio m³	2.3 km (1.4 mi)
Rossens FR	677 m (2,221 ft)	Lac de la Gruyère	9.60 km^{2} (3.71 sq mi)	220 mio m³	13.5 km (8.4 mi)
Fribourg	554 m (1,818 ft)	Lac de Pérolles	0.35 km^{2} (0.14 sq mi)	000.034 mio m³	2.3 km (1.4 mi)
Düdingen FR	532 m (1,745 ft)	Lake Schiffenen	4.25 km^{2} (1.64 sq mi)	065 mio m³	12 km (7.5 mi)

== See also ==
- List of rivers of Switzerland
