= Funiculaire Moléson-sur-Gruyères – Plan-Francey =

Funicular railway in the canton of Fribourg, Switzerland

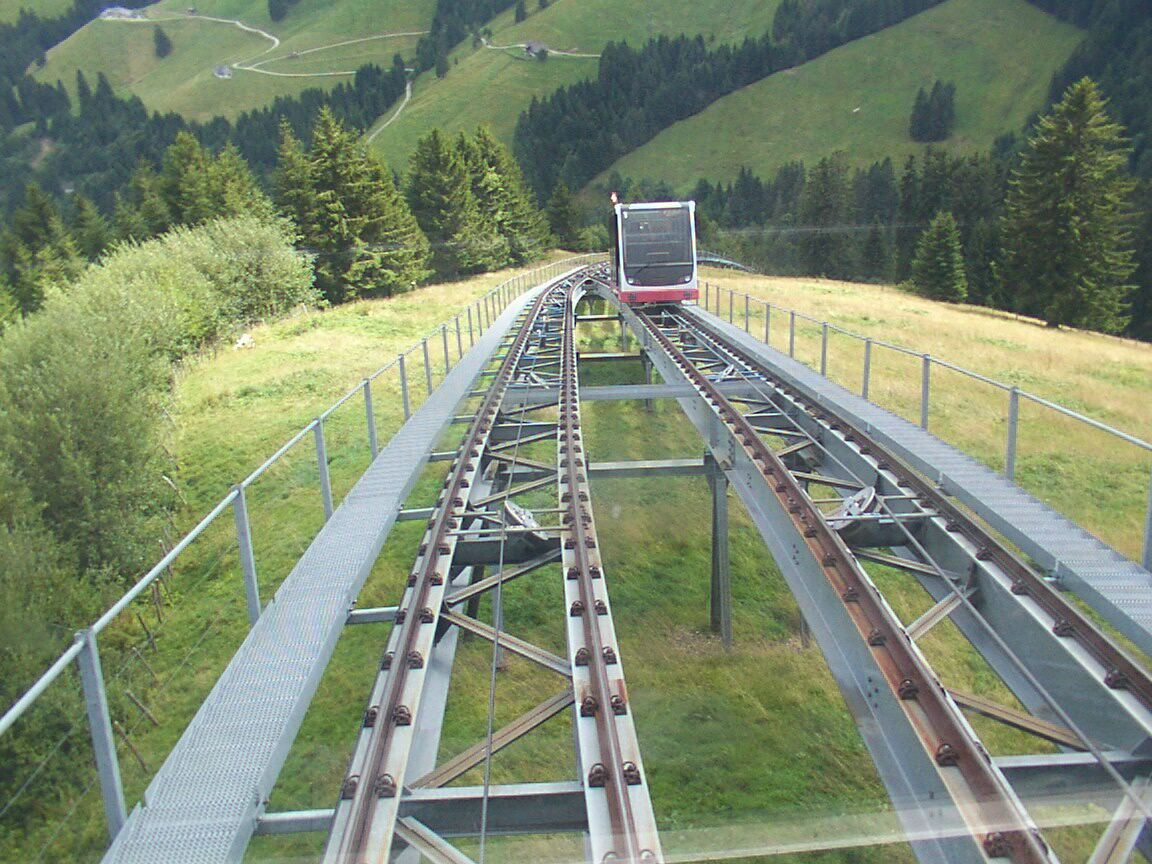
- passing loop in 2008

Overview
- Other name(s): Funiculaire du Moléson
- Status: In operation
- Owner: Centre Touristique Gruyères-Moléson-Vudalla S.A.
- Locale: Gruyères; Canton of Fribourg, Switzerland
- Termini: "Moléson-sur-Gruyères (funi)" at Place de l'Ichtyosaure; "Plan-Francey"
- Stations: 2
- Website: moleson.ch

Service
- Type: Funicular
- Route number: 2045
- Operator(s): Centre Touristique Gruyères-Moléson-Vudalla S.A.
- Rolling stock: 2

History
- Opened: 1998

Technical
- Line length: 1,350 m (4,430 ft)
- Number of tracks: 1 with passing loop
- Track gauge: 1,200 mm (3 ft 11 1/4 in)
- Highest elevation: 1,520 m (4,990 ft)

Funiculaire Moléson-sur-Gruyères – Plan-Francey is a funicular railway in the Canton of Fribourg, Switzerland. The line leads from Moléson-sur-Gruyères at 1111 m to Plan-Francey at 1520 m. From there, an aerial cableway continues to the summit of Moléson (2002 m). The line of the funicular has a length of about 1350 m (Note: Stated length varies: 1300 m, 1351 m, 1364 m, 1368 m, almost 1400 m, 1480 m (construction length)) and a difference of elevation of 409 m. The funicular with two cars has a single track with a passing loop.

Built in 1998, it replaced an aerial cableway from the 1960s. Already in the 1900s projects of funiculars, rack-railways and a train line to the top of Moléson were made, some receiving concessions, but ultimately not realized.

The funicular is owned and operated by the company Centre Touristique Gruyères-Moléson-Vudalla S.A. (abbreviated TTM or "GMV SA").
