= Saint-Germain Castle =

Castle in Gruyères, Fribourg, Switzerland

- Gruyères
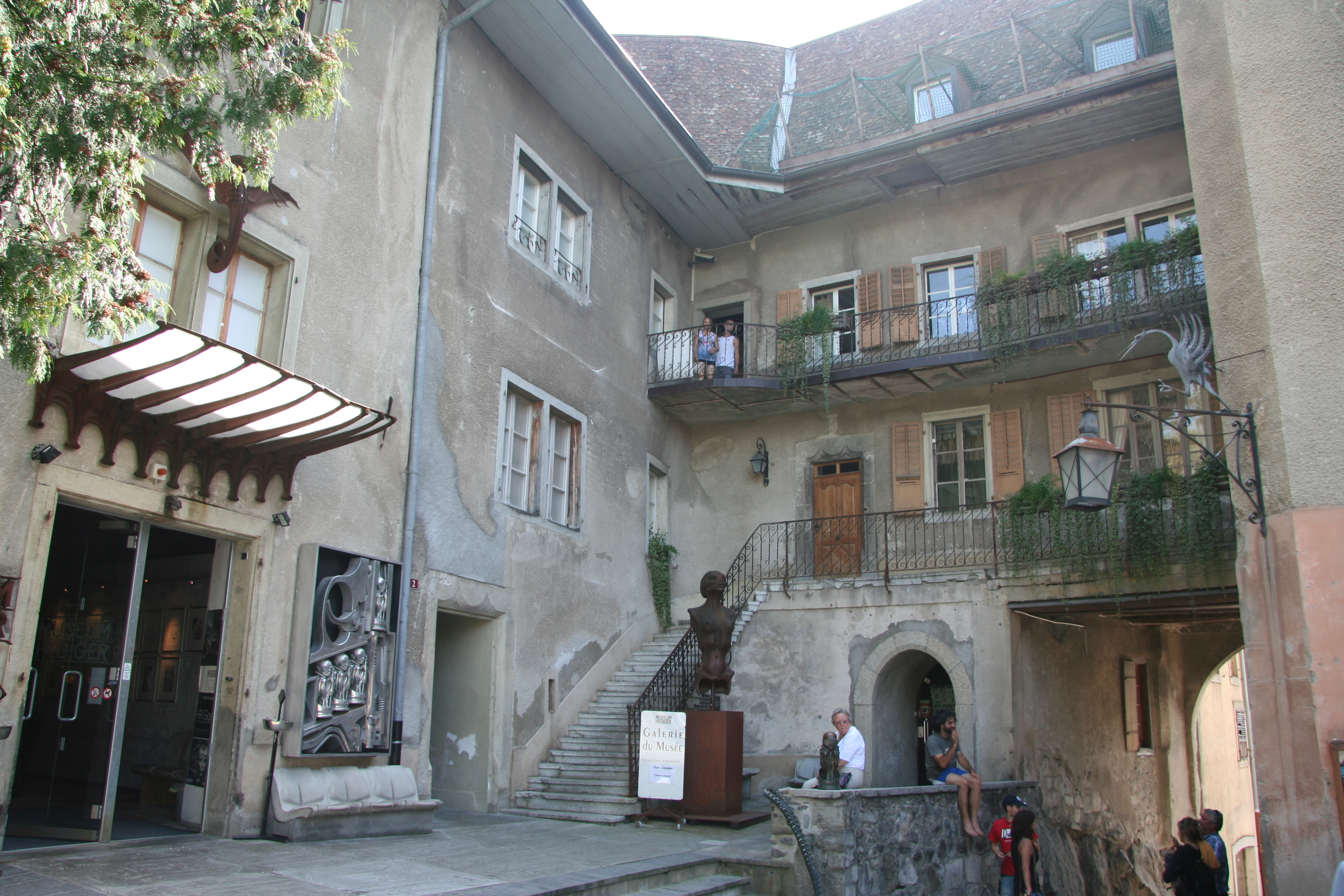
- Saint-Germain Castle

Site information
- Code: CH-FR
- Condition: Home of the H. R. Giger Museum

Location
- Coordinates: 46°35′03″N 7°04′57″E

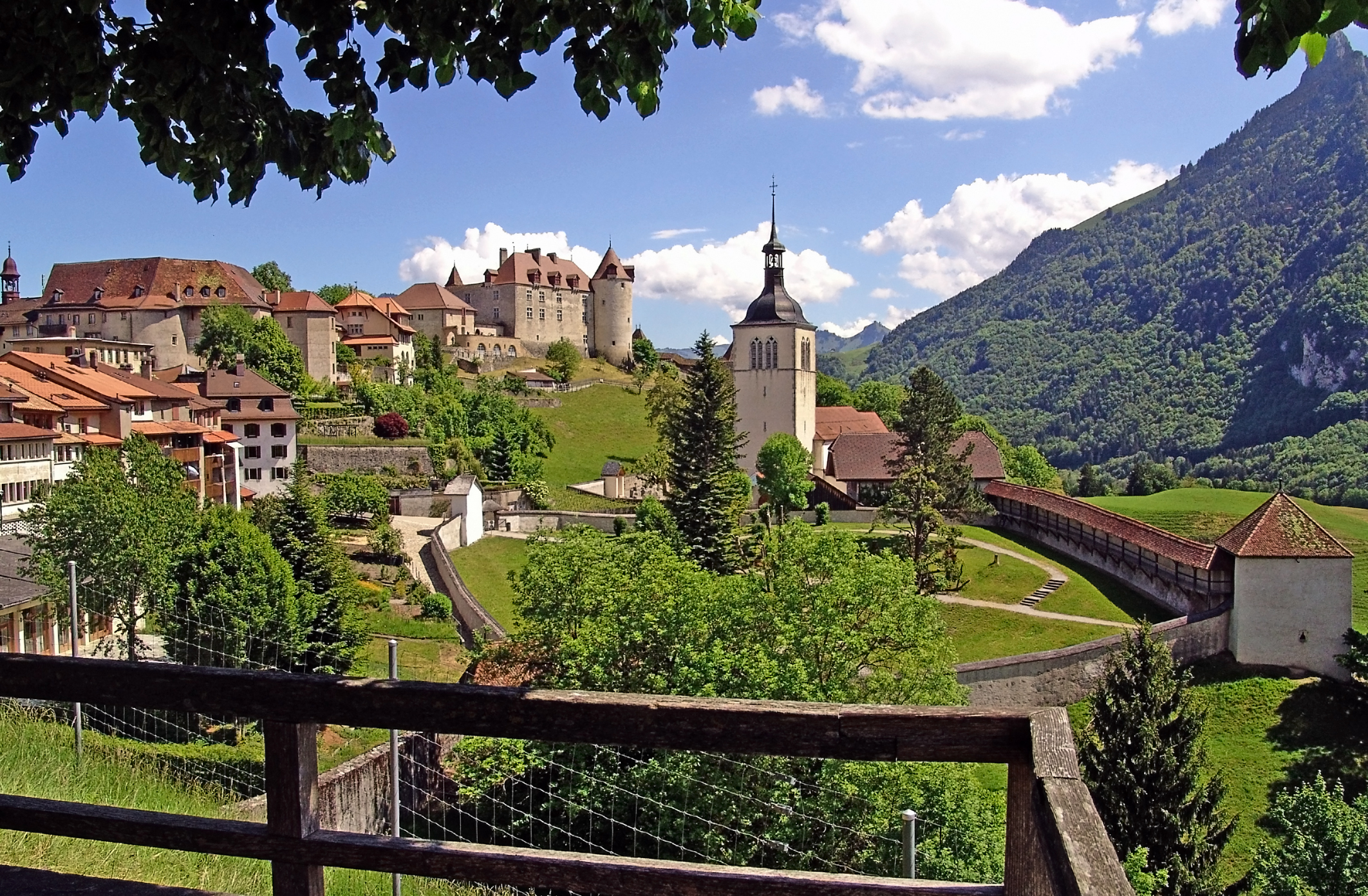
Saint Germain Castle (left), Gruyères Castle (center) and Saint-Théodule Church (right, foreground)

Saint-Germain Castle is a castle in the municipality of Gruyères of the Canton of Fribourg in Switzerland. It is a Swiss heritage site of national significance.

In 1998 Swiss surrealist painter, sculptor and set designer H. R. Giger acquired the castle, and it now houses the H. R. Giger Museum and Bar, a permanent repository of his work. His wife, Carmen Maria Scheifele Giger, is the Director of the H.R. Giger Museum.

== See also ==
- List of castles in Switzerland
- Château
- HR Giger
