= Le Pâquier, Fribourg =

Le Pâquier
- Municipality
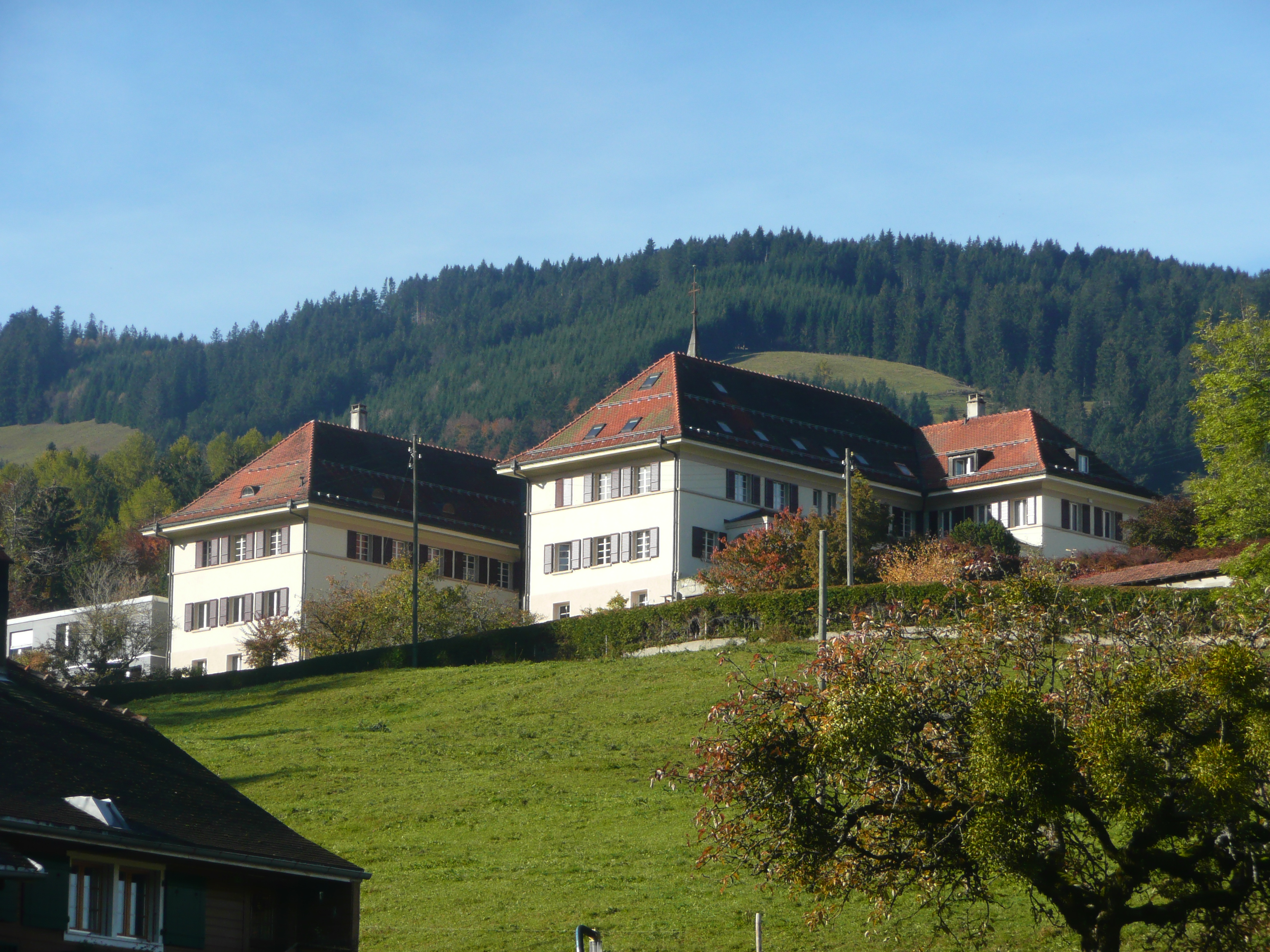
- Le Pâquier

- Coat of arms
- Location of Le Pâquier
- Location within Switzerland Location within Canton of Fribourg
- Coordinates: 46°36′N 7°3′E
- Country: Switzerland
- Canton: Fribourg
- District: Gruyère

Government
  - Mayor: Syndic

Area
  - Total: 4.50 km^{2} (1.74 sq mi)
- Elevation: 747 m (2,451 ft)

Population (December 2020)
  - Total: 1,338
  - Density: 297/km^{2} (770/sq mi)
- Time zone: UTC+01:00 (CET)
  - Summer (DST): UTC+02:00 (CEST)
- Postal code: 1661
- SFOS number: 2145
- ISO 3166 code: CH-FR
- Surrounded by: Gruyères, La Tour-de-Trême
- Website: lepaquier.ch

Le Pâquier (French: [lə pɑkje]; Arpitan: Le Pâquiér [lə paˈci]) is a municipality in the district of Gruyère in the canton of Fribourg in Switzerland.

== History ==
Le Pâquier is first mentioned in 1637 as Pasquier.

== Geography ==
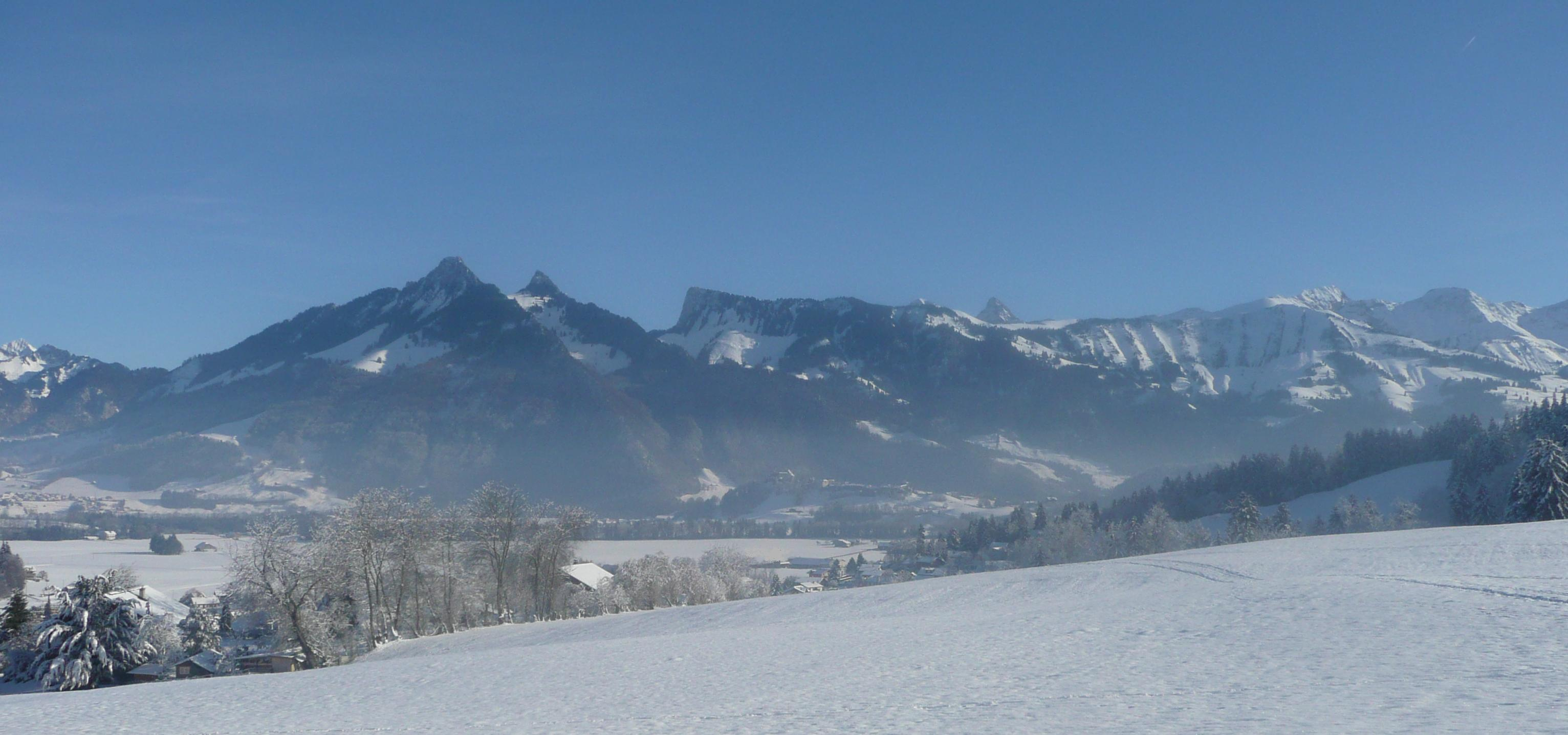
Le Pâquier

Aerial view (1964)

Le Pâquier has an area, as of 2009, of 4.5 square kilometers (1.7 mi^{2}). Of this area, 3.08 km^{2} (1.19 mi^{2}) or 68.6% is used for agricultural purposes, while 0.78 km^{2} (0.30 mi^{2}) or 17.4% is forested. Of the rest of the land, 0.59 km^{2} (0.23 mi^{2}) or 13.1% is settled (buildings or roads), 0.02 km^{2} (4.9 acres) or 0.4% is either rivers or lakes and 0.01 km^{2} (2.5 acres) or 0.2% is unproductive land.

Of the built up area, housing and buildings made up 8.7% and transportation infrastructure made up 2.4%. Out of the forested land, 14.7% of the total land area is heavily forested and 2.7% is covered with orchards or small clusters of trees. Of the agricultural land, 5.6% is used for growing crops and 50.1% is pastures and 12.5% is used for alpine pastures. All the water in the municipality is flowing water.

The municipality is located in the Gruyère district, on the northern foot of Moléson mountain.

== Coat of arms ==
The blazon of the municipal coat of arms is Azure, three Trefoils slipped issuant from Coupeaux of the same.

== Demographics ==
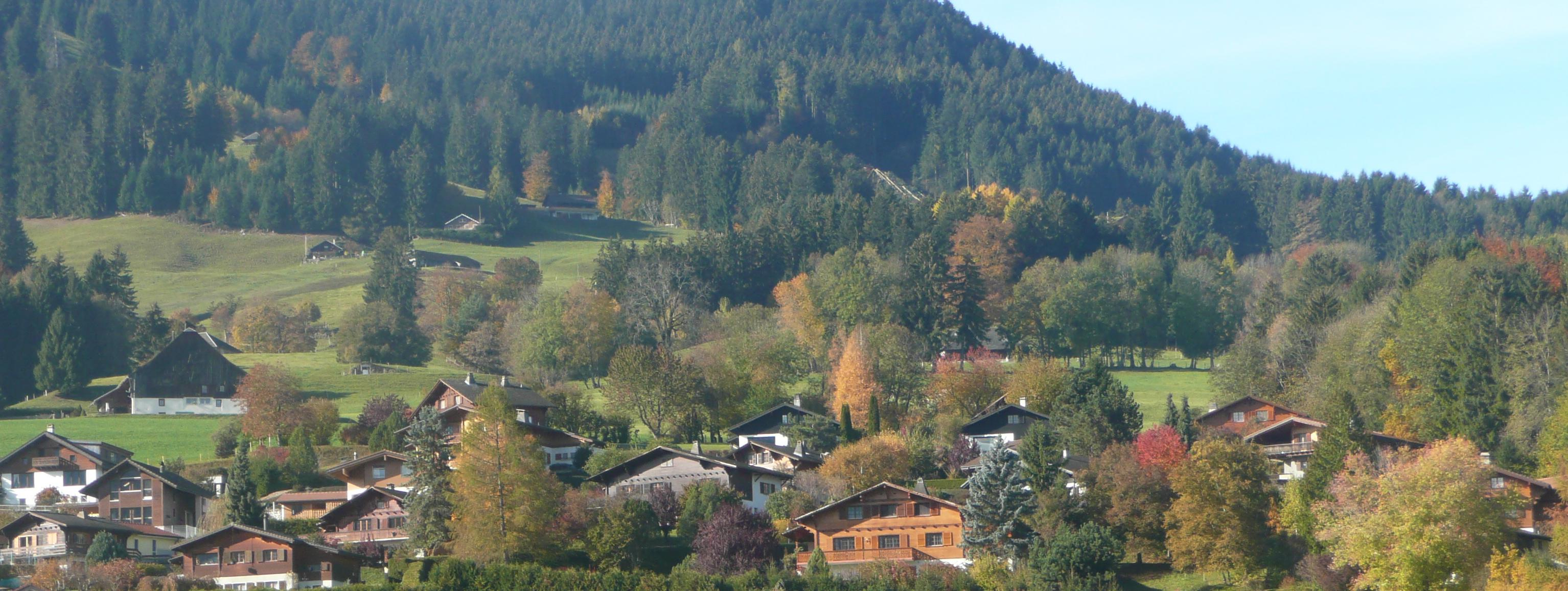
View of Le Pâquier

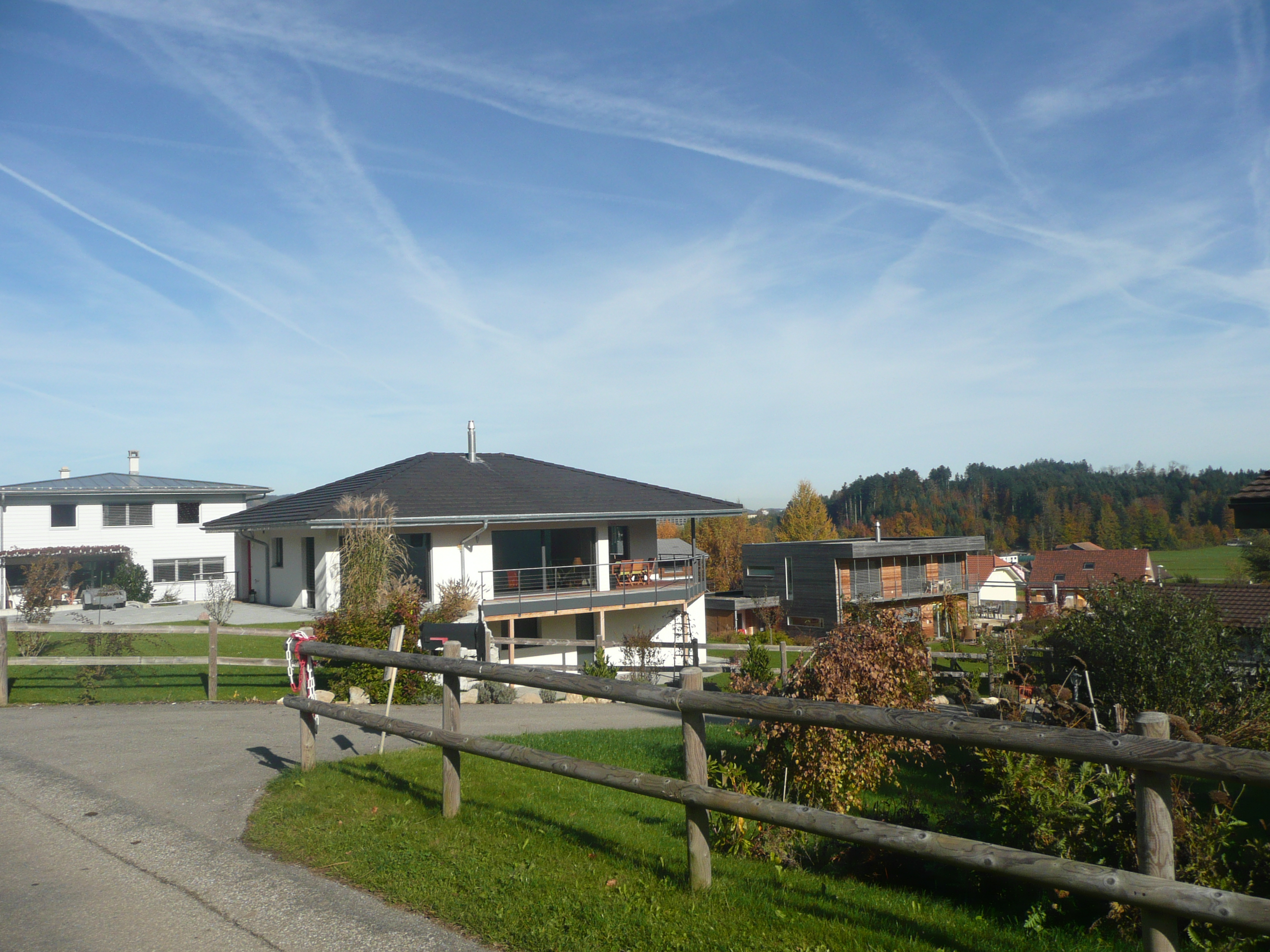
Houses in Le Pâquier

Le Pâquier has a population (as of December 2020) of 1,338. As of 2008, 9.8% of the population are resident foreign nationals. Over the last 10 years (2000–2010) the population has changed at a rate of 16.7%. Migration accounted for 13.7%, while births and deaths accounted for 2.1%.

Most of the population (as of 2000) speaks French (871 or 93.4%) as their first language, German is the second most common (37 or 4.0%) and Portuguese is the third (11 or 1.2%). There is 1 person who speaks Italian.

As of 2008, the population was 49.3% male and 50.7% female. The population was made up of 462 Swiss men (43.0% of the population) and 68 (6.3%) non-Swiss men. There were 491 Swiss women (45.7%) and 53 (4.9%) non-Swiss women. Of the population in the municipality, 266 or about 28.5% were born in Le Pâquier and lived there in 2000. There were 412 or 44.2% who were born in the same canton, while 139 or 14.9% were born somewhere else in Switzerland, and 81 or 8.7% were born outside of Switzerland.

As of 2000, children and teenagers (0–19 years old) make up 29.7% of the population, while adults (20–64 years old) make up 57.3% and seniors (over 64 years old) make up 13%.

As of 2000, there were 438 people who were single and never married in the municipality. There were 430 married individuals, 35 widows or widowers and 30 individuals who are divorced.

As of 2000, there were 320 private households in the municipality, and an average of 2.8 persons per household. There were 82 households that consist of only one person and 40 households with five or more people. In 2000, a total of 311 apartments (79.1% of the total) were permanently occupied, while 67 apartments (17.0%) were seasonally occupied and 15 apartments (3.8%) were empty. As of 2009, the construction rate of new housing units was 3.7 new units per 1000 residents. The vacancy rate for the municipality, in 2010, was 0.45%.

The historical population is given in the following chart:

== Politics ==
In the 2011 federal election the most popular party was the SP which received 28.9% of the vote. The next three most popular parties were the CVP (21.5%), the SVP (20.3%) and the FDP (12.1%).

The SPS improved their position in Le Pâquier rising to first, from second in 2007 (with 24.4%) The CVP moved from first in 2007 (with 31.9%) to second in 2011, the SVP retained about the same popularity (19.6% in 2007) and the FDP retained about the same popularity (13.9% in 2007). A total of 395 votes were cast in this election, of which 4 or 1.0% were invalid.

== Economy ==
As of 2010, Le Pâquier had an unemployment rate of 2.6%. As of 2008, there were 40 people employed in the primary economic sector and about 13 businesses involved in this sector. 83 people were employed in the secondary sector and there were 5 businesses in this sector. 56 people were employed in the tertiary sector, with 18 businesses in this sector. There were 428 residents of the municipality who were employed in some capacity, of which females made up 39.3% of the workforce.

In 2008 the total number of full-time equivalent jobs was 155. The number of jobs in the primary sector was 32, of which 28 were in agriculture and 4 were in forestry or lumber production. The number of jobs in the secondary sector was 82 of which 9 or (11.0%) were in manufacturing and 72 (87.8%) were in construction. The number of jobs in the tertiary sector was 41. In the tertiary sector; 1 was in the sale or repair of motor vehicles, 13 or 31.7% were in a hotel or restaurant, 3 or 7.3% were in the information industry, 1 was the insurance or financial industry, 2 or 4.9% were technical professionals or scientists, 8 or 19.5% were in education.

In 2000, there were 45 workers who commuted into the municipality and 334 workers who commuted away. The municipality is a net exporter of workers, with about 7.4 workers leaving the municipality for every one entering. Of the working population, 7.2% used public transportation to get to work, and 74.3% used a private car.

== Religion ==
From the 2000 census, 754 or 80.8% were Roman Catholic, while 74 or 7.9% belonged to the Swiss Reformed Church. Of the rest of the population, there were 6 members of an Orthodox church (or about 0.64% of the population), and there were 8 individuals (or about 0.86% of the population) who belonged to another Christian church. There were 4 (or about 0.43% of the population) who were Islamic. There were 9 individuals who were Buddhist and 2 individuals who belonged to another church. 44 (or about 4.72% of the population) belonged to no church, are agnostic or atheist, and 36 individuals (or about 3.86% of the population) did not answer the question.

== Education ==
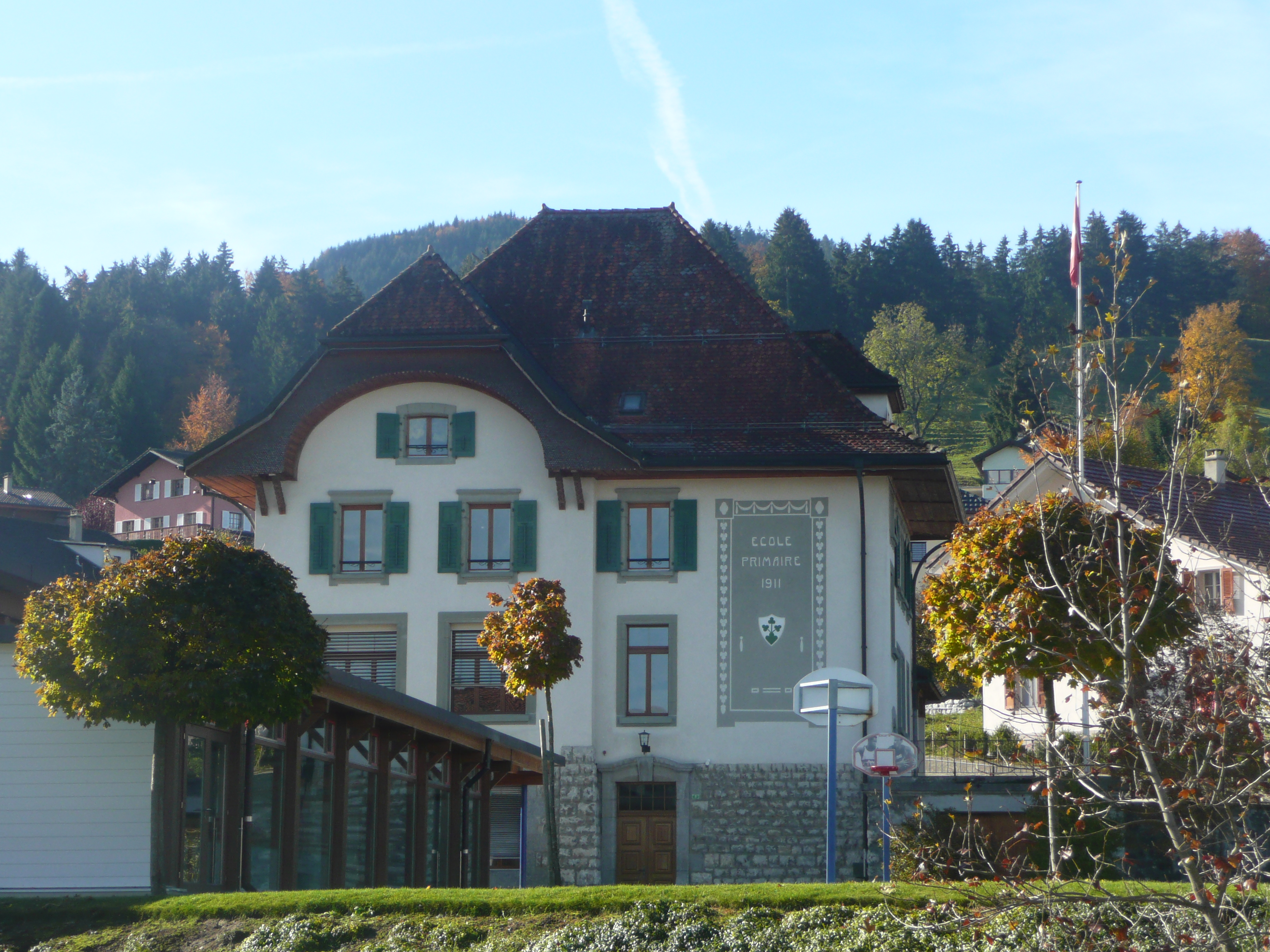
Old primary school

In Le Pâquier about 293 or (31.4%) of the population have completed non-mandatory upper secondary education, and 118 or (12.6%) have completed additional higher education (either university or a Fachhochschule). Of the 118 who completed tertiary schooling, 62.7% were Swiss men, 26.3% were Swiss women, 6.8% were non-Swiss men and 4.2% were non-Swiss women.

The Canton of Fribourg school system provides one year of non-obligatory Kindergarten, followed by six years of Primary school. This is followed by three years of obligatory lower Secondary school where the students are separated according to ability and aptitude. Following the lower Secondary students may attend a three or four year optional upper Secondary school. The upper Secondary school is divided into gymnasium (university preparatory) and vocational programs. After they finish the upper Secondary program, students may choose to attend a Tertiary school or continue their apprenticeship.

During the 2010–11 school year, there were a total of 132 students attending 8 classes in Le Pâquier. A total of 252 students from the municipality attended any school, either in the municipality or outside of it. There were 2 kindergarten classes with a total of 23 students in the municipality. The municipality had 6 primary classes and 109 students. During the same year, there were no lower secondary classes in the municipality, but 46 students attended lower secondary school in a neighboring municipality. There were no upper Secondary classes or vocational classes, but there were 31 upper Secondary students and 42 upper Secondary vocational students who attended classes in another municipality. The municipality had no non-university Tertiary classes, but there were 2 specialized Tertiary students who attended classes in another municipality.

As of 2000, there were 5 students in Le Pâquier who came from another municipality, while 75 residents attended schools outside the municipality.
