= Gruyères =

- Municipality
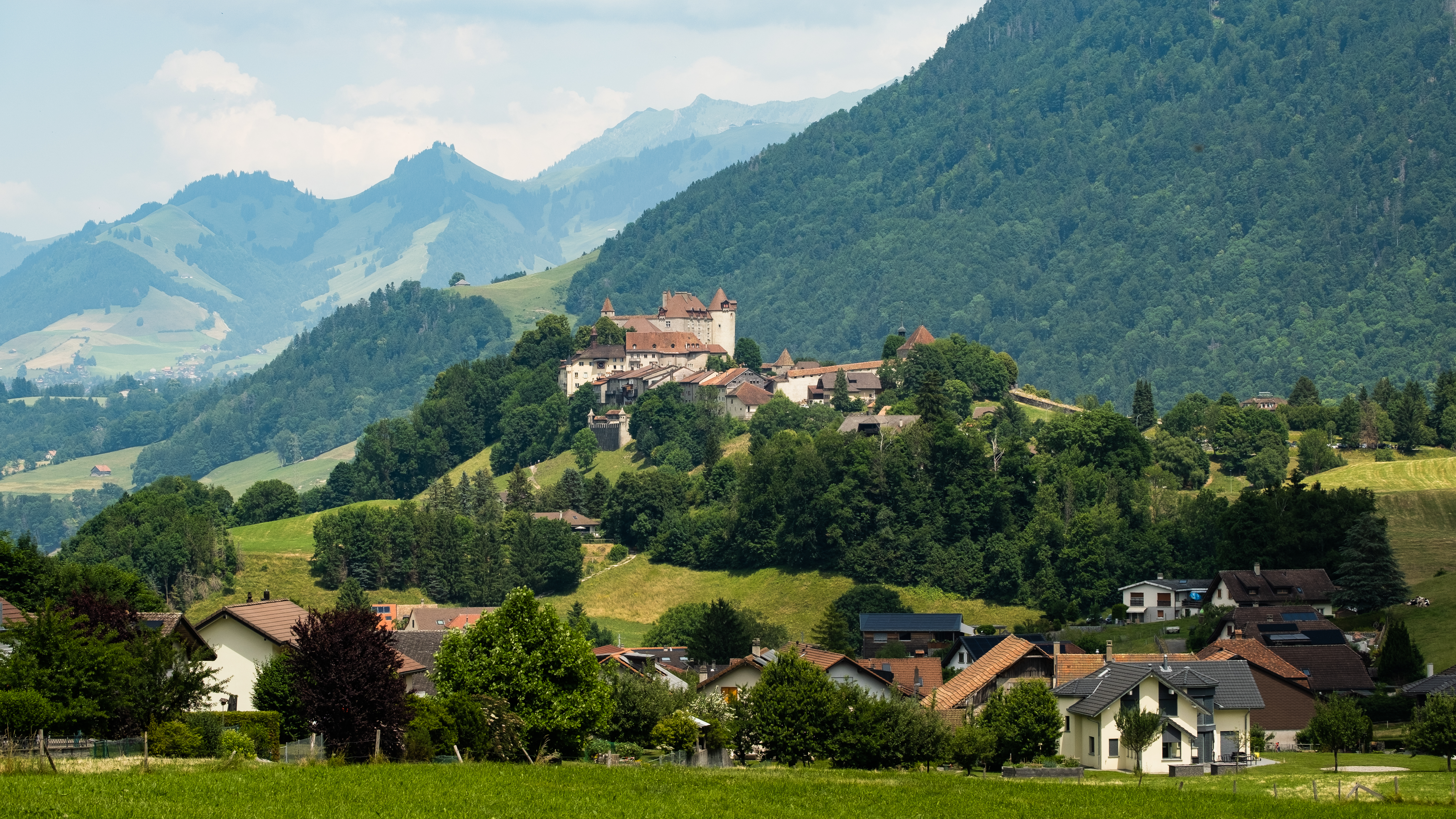

- Flag Coat of arms
- Location of Gruyères
- Location within Switzerland Location within Canton of Fribourg
- Coordinates: 46°35′N 7°5′E
- Country: Switzerland
- Canton: Fribourg
- District: Gruyère

Government
  - Mayor: Syndic

Area
  - Total: 28.39 km^{2} (10.96 sq mi)
- Elevation: 810 m (2,660 ft)

Population (December 2005)
  - Total: 2,205
  - Density: 77.67/km^{2} (201.2/sq mi)
- Time zone: UTC+01:00 (CET)
  - Summer (DST): UTC+02:00 (CEST)
- Postal code: 1663
- SFOS number: 2135
- ISO 3166 code: CH-FR
- Localities: Gruyères, Épagny, Pringy, Moléson-sur-Gruyères, Saussivue, Le Pont, Le Creux
- Surrounded by: Bas-Intyamon, Broc, Bulle, Haut-Intyamon, La Tour-de-Trême, Le Pâquier, Semsales, Val-de-Charmey, Vaulruz, Vuadens
- Website: gruyeres.ch

Gruyères (French pronunciation: [ɡʁɥijɛʁ]; Arpitan: Gruviéres [ɡʁəˈviʁ]; Fribourgeois: Grevire; German: Greyerz [ˈɡraɪərts]) is a town in the district of Gruyère in the canton of Fribourg, Switzerland.

The medieval town is an important tourist location in the upper valley of the Saane/Sarine River and gives its name to Gruyère cheese. The medieval town is located at the top of an 82-metre-high (269 ft) hill overlooking the Saane Valley and the Lake of Gruyère.

== Geography ==
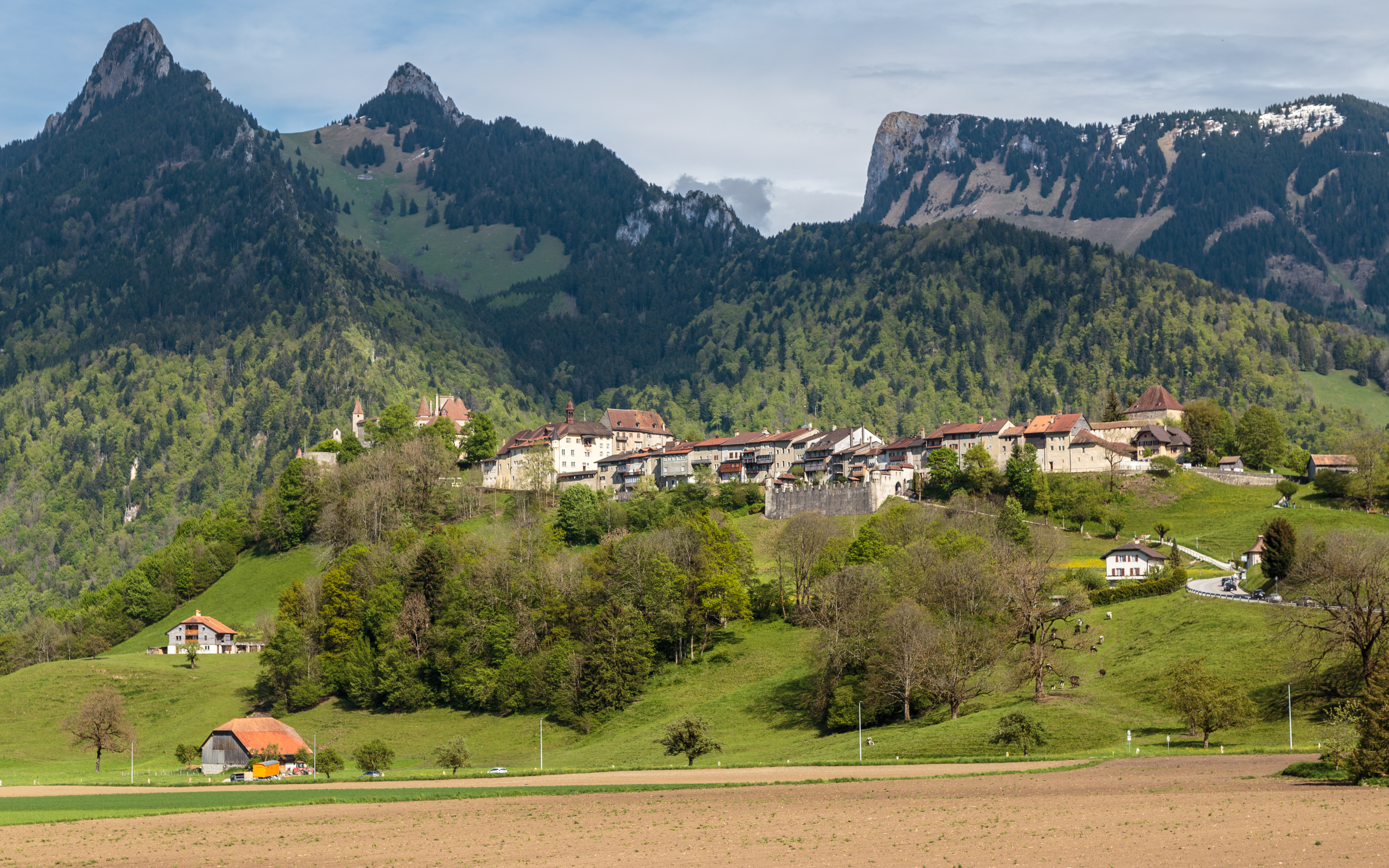
The landscape of Gruyères

Gruyères has an area, as of 2009, of 28.4 km^{2} (11.0 mi^{2}), of which 11.5 km^{2} (4.4 mi^{2}) (40.5%) are used for agricultural purposes, while 14.18 km^{2} (5.47 mi^{2}) or 50.0% is forested. Of the rest of the land, 1.55 km^{2} (0.60 mi^{2}) or 5.5% is settled (buildings or roads), 0.24 km^{2} (0.093 mi^{2}) or 0.8% is either rivers or lakes and 0.92 km^{2} (0.36 mi^{2}) or 3.2% is unproductive land.

Of the built-up area, housing and buildings made up 2.5% and transportation infrastructure made up 2.1%. Of the forested land, 46.8% of the total land area is heavily forested and 2.7% is covered with orchards or small clusters of trees. Of the agricultural land, 4.6% is used for growing crops, 12.9% is pastures, and 22.9% is used for alpine pastures. All the water in the municipality is flowing water.

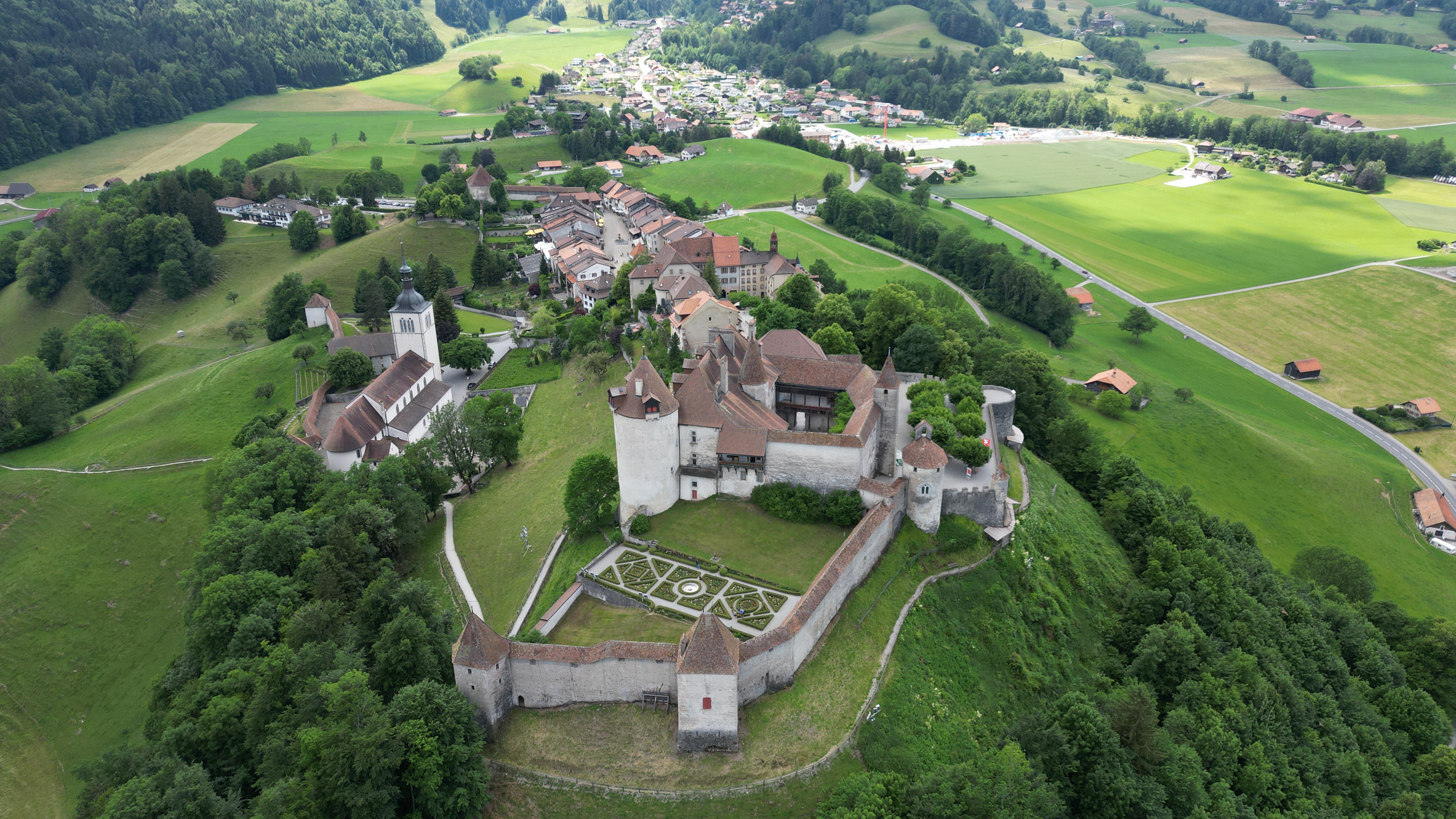
Gruyères Castle (Château de Gruyères)

Gruyères is 810 m (2,660 ft) above sea level, 4.5 km (2.8 mi) south-south-east of the district capital Bulle. The historical town is placed on top of an isolated hill north of the Alps, in the foothills of Mount Moléson. It is also the location where the Saane River (French name: Sarine) leaves the Fribourg alps.

The area of the municipality comprises a section of the Saane/Sarine Valley and of the Fribourg Alps. The central part of the area is the alluvial plains (690 m [ 2,260 ft ] above sea level) next to the Alps, between Gruyères and Broc, from which the hill of Gruyères rises to 828 m [ 2,717 ft ] above sea level. From the west, the brook Trême meets the Saane. East of the Saane, the municipality area ends in a small corner, bordered by the ridges of Dent de Broc (1,829 m [ 6,001 ft ] above sea level) in the north and Dent du Chamois (1,830 m [ 6,000 ft ] above sea level) in the south, ending at the valley of Motélon. The two peaks with their saddle between them are a popular subject for photographs of Gruyères.

Southwest of Gruyères, the municipality comprises most of the catchment area of the brook Albeuve, which originates on the flanks of mount Moléson. The top of mount Moléson is the highest point of the municipality, reaching 2,002 m (6,568 ft) above sea level. West of the Moléson, the densely wooded right valley side of the Trême and the terrace of La Part Dieu belong to Gruyères.

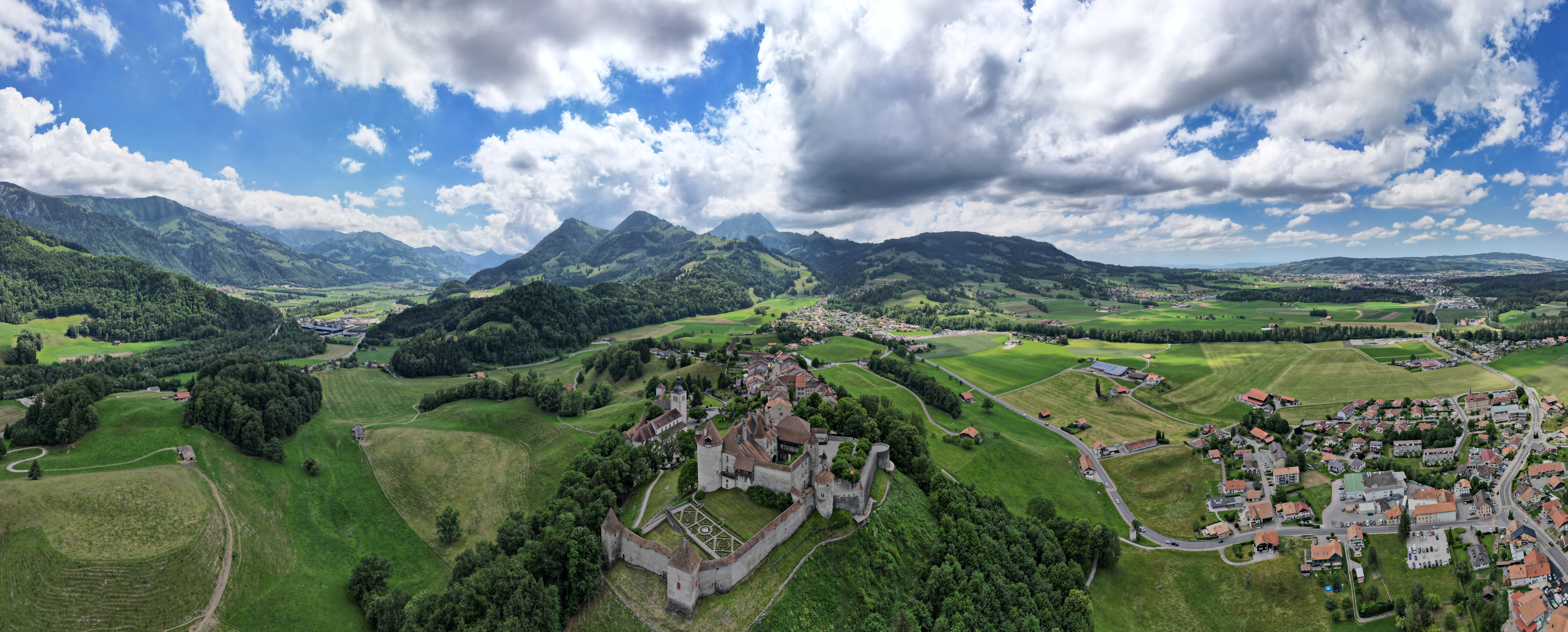
Gruyères panorama 140622

The municipality of Gruyères also comprises the two villages of Épagny (715 m [ 2,346 ft ] above sea level) to the north and Pringy (750 m [ 2,460 ft ] above sea level) to the west of the town hill. Further, the small village Saussivue (710 m [ 2,330 ft ] above sea level) to the south and the holiday settlement Moléson-Village (1,132 m [ 3,714 ft ]above sea level) in the valley of the Albeuve in the foothills of mount Moléson as well as several isolated farms. Neighbour municipalities of Gruyères are Broc, Charmey, Bas-Intyamon, Haut-Intyamon, Semsales, Vaulruz, Vuadens, Bulle, La Tour-de-Trême and Le Pâquier.

== Coat of arms ==
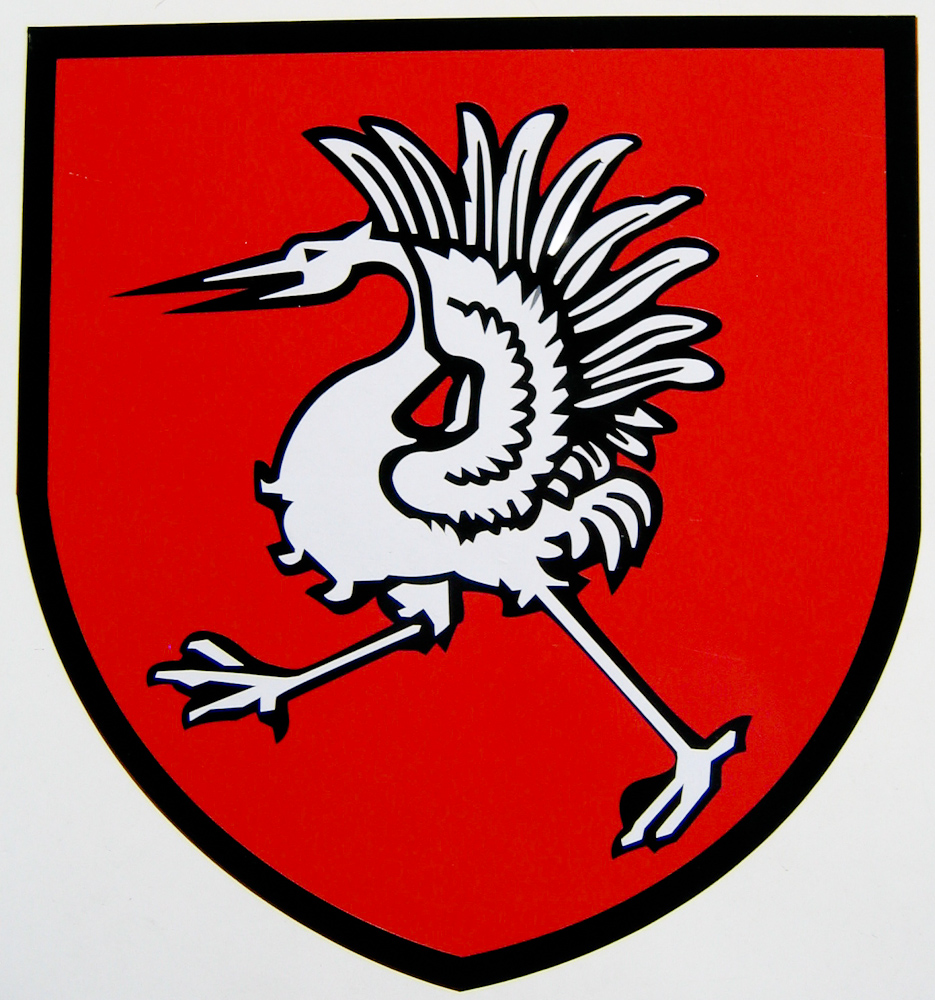
The heraldic representation of the crane (French: grue), which inspired the name of the town of Gruyères

The blazon of the municipal coat of arms is Gules, a Crane rising Argent.

== Demographics ==
Gruyères has a population (as of December 2020) of 2,205. As of 2008, 14.7% of the population are resident foreign nationals. Over the last 10 years (2000–2010) the population has changed at a rate of 21.2%. Migration accounted for 17.5%, while births and deaths accounted for 4.2%.

Most of the population (as of 2000) speaks French (1,398 or 90.4%) as their first language, German is the second most common (60 or 3.9%) and Portuguese is the third (18 or 1.2%). There are 7 people who speak Italian and 2 people who speak Romansh.

As of 2008, the population was 50.6% male and 49.4% female. The population was made up of 760 Swiss men (42.0% of the population) and 154 (8.5%) non-Swiss men. There were 764 Swiss women (42.3%) and 130 (7.2%) non-Swiss women. Of the population in the municipality, 508 or about 32.9% were born in Gruyères and lived there in 2000. There were 598 or 38.7% who were born in the same canton, while 194 or 12.5% were born somewhere else in Switzerland, and 182 or 11.8% were born outside of Switzerland.

As of 2000, children and teenagers (0–19 years old) made up 29.7% of the population, while adults (20–64 years old) made up 55% and seniors (over 64 years old) made up 15.3%.

As of 2000, there were 684 people who were single and never married in the municipality. There were 710 married individuals, 94 widows or widowers and 58 individuals who are divorced.

As of 2000, there were 581 private households in the municipality, and an average of 2.5 persons per household. There were 176 households that consist of only one person and 53 households with five or more people. In 2000, a total of 562 apartments (64.4% of the total) were permanently occupied, while 257 apartments (29.5%) were seasonally occupied and 53 apartments (6.1%) were empty. As of 2009, the construction rate of new housing units was 2.2 new units per 1000 residents. The vacancy rate for the municipality, in 2010, was 0.74%.

The historical population is given in the following chart:

== Economics ==
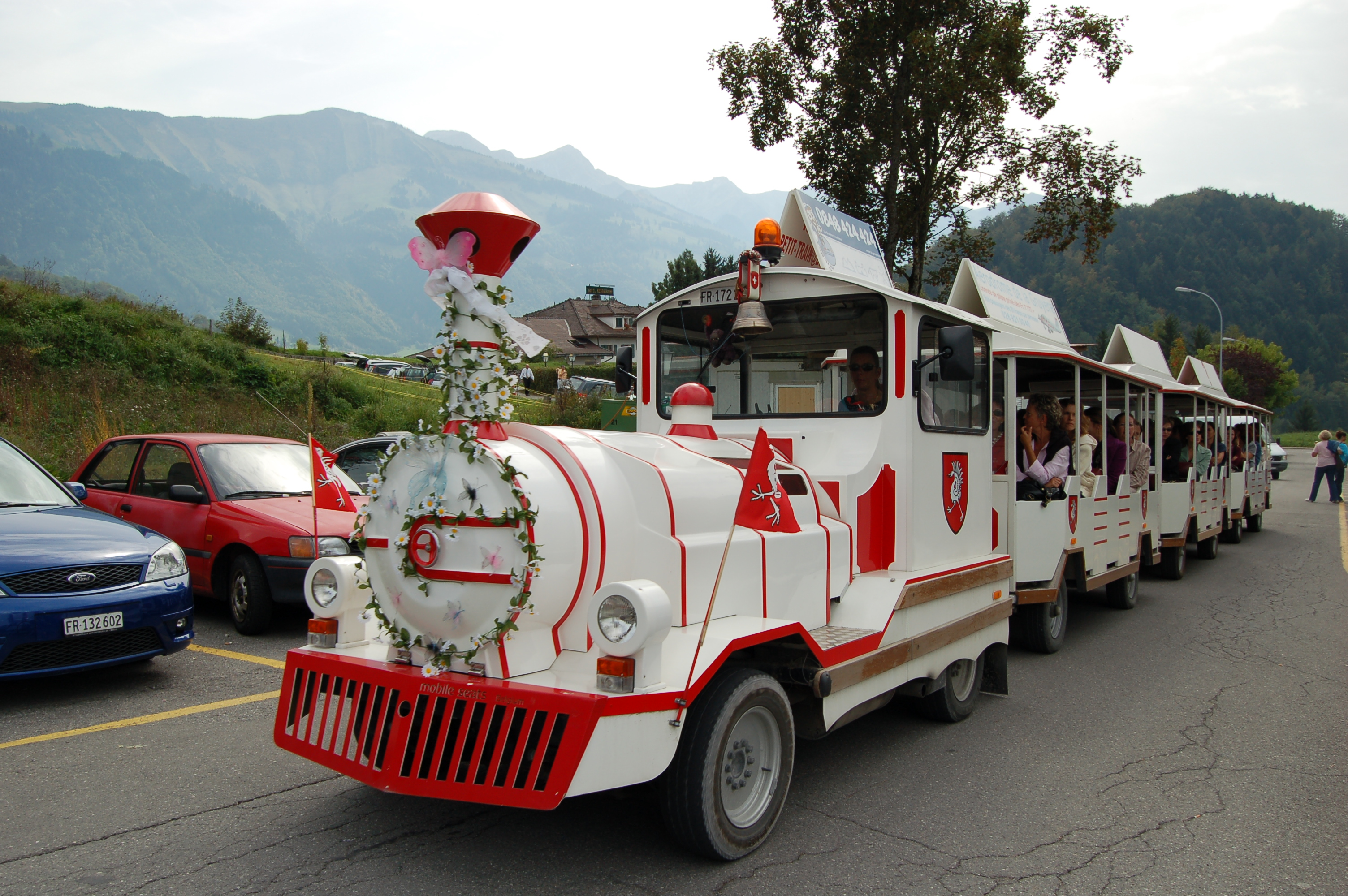
Trackless train in Gruyères

Gruyères has always been a rural town. Agricultural products from the surroundings were processed and brought to the market here. Formerly, the focus was on trading cheese and small and big animals. There were several mills and sawmills and since the 18th century a gunpowder factory. Until the beginning of the 20th century, straw-twisting was also rather important.

Agriculture is still specialized in milk production and cattle-breeding. It delivers raw materials for the cheese production and meat treating. Most important is Gruyère cheese. Forestry is also a factor, but tillage is less applied. In secondary sector, there are cabinetmaking, precision mechanics and craftworks. Services has a lot of jobs to offer in gastronomics and hotels. The villages of Epagny and Pringy have in the last years become a living place for commuters, mostly working in the town of Bulle.

As of 2010, Gruyères had an unemployment rate of 2.5%. As of 2008, there were 59 people employed in the primary economic sector and about 19 businesses involved in this sector. 229 people were employed in the secondary sector and there were 27 businesses in this sector. 447 people were employed in the tertiary sector, with 69 businesses in this sector. There were 757 residents of the municipality who were employed in some capacity, of which women made up 42.8% of the workforce.

In 2008 the total number of full-time equivalent jobs was 601. The number of jobs in the primary sector was 44, of which 39 were in agriculture and 5 were in forestry or lumber production. The number of jobs in the secondary sector was 215 of which 120 or (55.8%) were in manufacturing and 95 (44.2%) were in construction. The number of jobs in the tertiary sector was 342. In the tertiary sector; 62 or 18.1% were in wholesale or retail sales or the repair of motor vehicles, 33 or 9.6% were in the movement and storage of goods, 131 or 38.3% were in a hotel or restaurant, 1 was in the information industry, 3 or 0.9% were technical professionals or scientists, 35 or 10.2% were in education and 45 or 13.2% were in health care.

In 2000, there were 366 workers who commuted into the municipality and 478 workers who commuted away. The municipality is a net exporter of workers, with about 1.3 workers leaving the municipality for every one entering. Of the working population, 7.5% used public transportation to get to work, and 69.7% used a private car.

== History ==
Graves from the Hallstatt era and La Tène era (325-250 BC) as well as other traces from the Bronze Age were discovered in Epagny. The remains of a Roman era villa from the 2nd-3rd century AD and an Early Middle Ages cemetery were also found nearby. A Roman settlement was probably located on a hill in Gruyères.

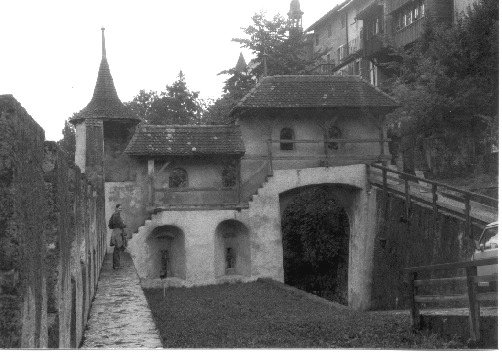
Medieval Gruyères

Gruyères stands in the midst of the Fribourg green pre-Alpine foothills. The castle towers above the medieval town. Gruerius, the legendary founder of Gruyères, captured a crane (in French: “grue”) and chose it as his heraldic animal, inspiring the name Gruyères. Despite the importance of the House of Gruyères, its beginnings remain quite mysterious. Gruyères is first mentioned around 1138–39 as de Grueri. The town developed beneath the castle, which the Count of Gruyere had built on top of the hill, to control the upper Saanen valley. By 1195-96 it became a market town with a central street and city walls. The town developed separately of the castle. In 1397 Count Rudolph IV of Gruyères confirmed an older town charter that was based on the model of Moudon.

On 22 June 1476 Gruyères participated in the Battle of Morat against Charles the Bold, Duke of Burgundy. With the help of the Old Swiss Confederacy, they routed the Burgundian army and captured three capes of the Order of the Golden Fleece which belonged to Charles the Bold including one with the emblems of Philip the Good, his father. At the time of the battle he was celebrating the anniversary of the death of his father.

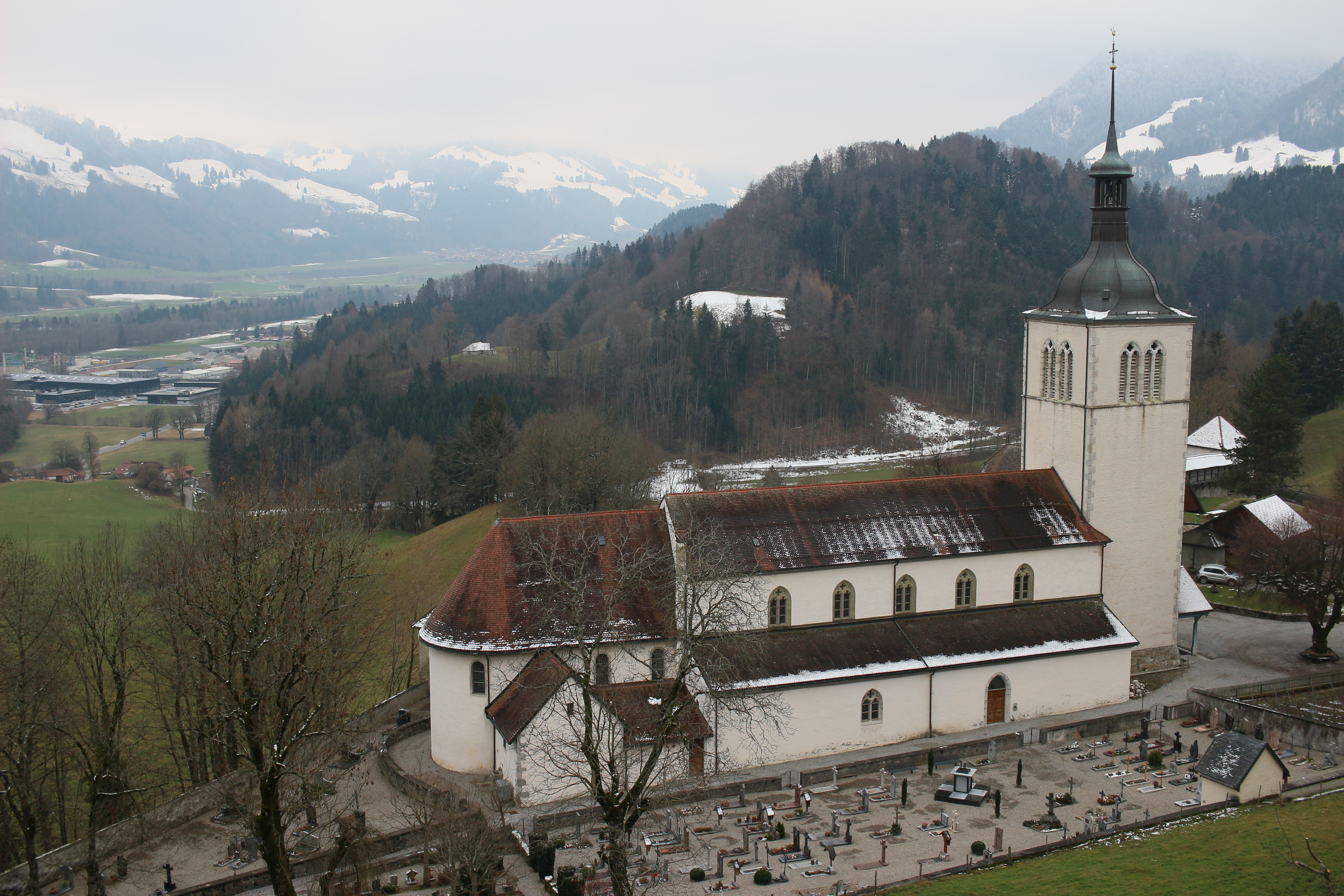
Church in Gruyères (2016)

The town church of Gruyères originally belonged to the parish of Bulle. Count Rudolph III allowed the villages on the left bank of the Saane to build St. Theodul's church. When it was dedicated in 1254, it was the parish church of the new Gruyères parish. The Counts of Gruyères were buried under the altar of St. Michael in the church. It was mostly destroyed in 1670 and again in 1856 by fire, which only left the choir and tower undamaged. The renovated church was consecrated in 1860. In addition to the parish church, the Counts had the Chapel of St. John the Baptist in the castle, with two glass windows dating from the late 15th century. The Chapel of St. Moritz in the old hospital was built with the hospital in 1431. The Chapelle du Berceau was built in 1612, following a plague that killed 140.

During the Thirty Years' War, nuns from St. Bernard and the Visitation Order fled from Besançon and Dole to settle in Gruyères. The latter remained in town between 1639 and 1651 and conducted a private school. Starting in the 15th century a primary school opened in town which was open mainly to boys. A secondary school opened in town in the 20th century but it moved in 1973 to Bulle. Gruyères had a plague house which was first mentioned in 1341. The town's hospital was founded in the mid-15th century and remained in operation until the second half of the 19th century. One side of the hospital building housed the primary school until 1988 and was then renovated into a nursing home. Between 1891 and 1925 the Ingenbohl sisters ran the Deaf and Dumb Institute of Saint-Joseph in Gruyères. In 1925 it moved to Fribourg.

Aerial view (1964)

Nineteen counts are accounted for in the period between the 11th and 16th centuries. The last of them, Michel, had been in financial trouble almost all his life only to end in bankruptcy in 1554. His creditors the cantons of Fribourg and Bern shared his earldom between them. From 1555 to 1798 the castle became residence to the bailiffs and then to the prefects sent by Fribourg. In 1849 the castle was put up for sale and sold to the Bovy and Balland families, who stayed at the castle during summer time and restored it with the help of their painter friends. The castle was then bought back by the canton of Fribourg in 1938, made into a museum and opened to the public. Since 1993, a foundation ensures the conservation as well as the highlighting of the building and the collection.

== Heritage sites of national significance ==
- Gruyères Castle
- Saint-Germain Castle
- the town's fortifications
- the Grange du Laviau
- the House at Rue du Bourg 7
- the House at Rue du Bourg 39 and the House dite de Chalamala at Rue du Bourg 47 are listed as Swiss heritage site of national significance
- The Former Chartreuse De La Part-Dieu
- The entire village of Gruyères and the La Part-Dieu area are part of the Inventory of Swiss Heritage Sites.

== Gallery ==
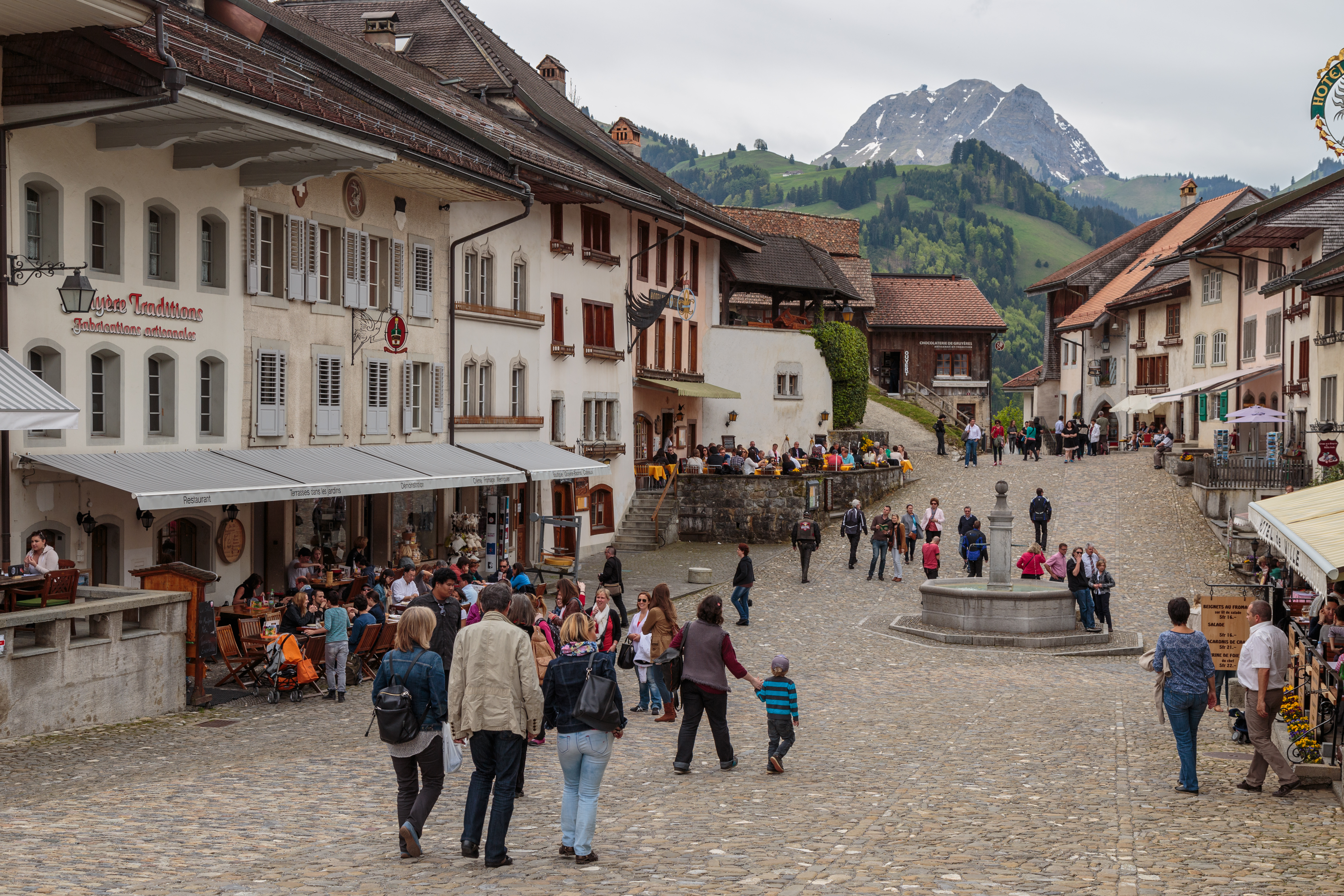
Rue du Bourg

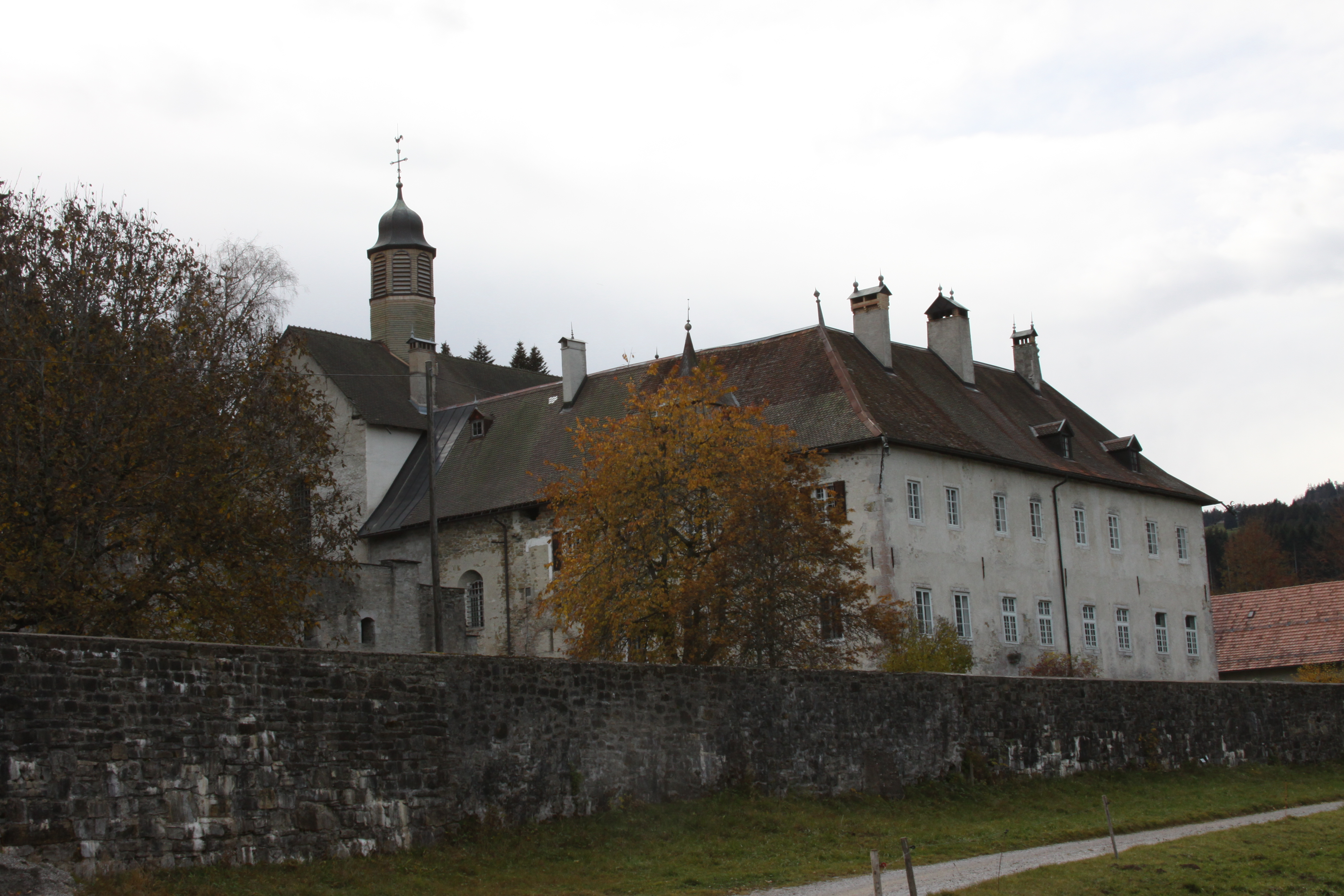
Former Chartreuse De La Part-Dieu

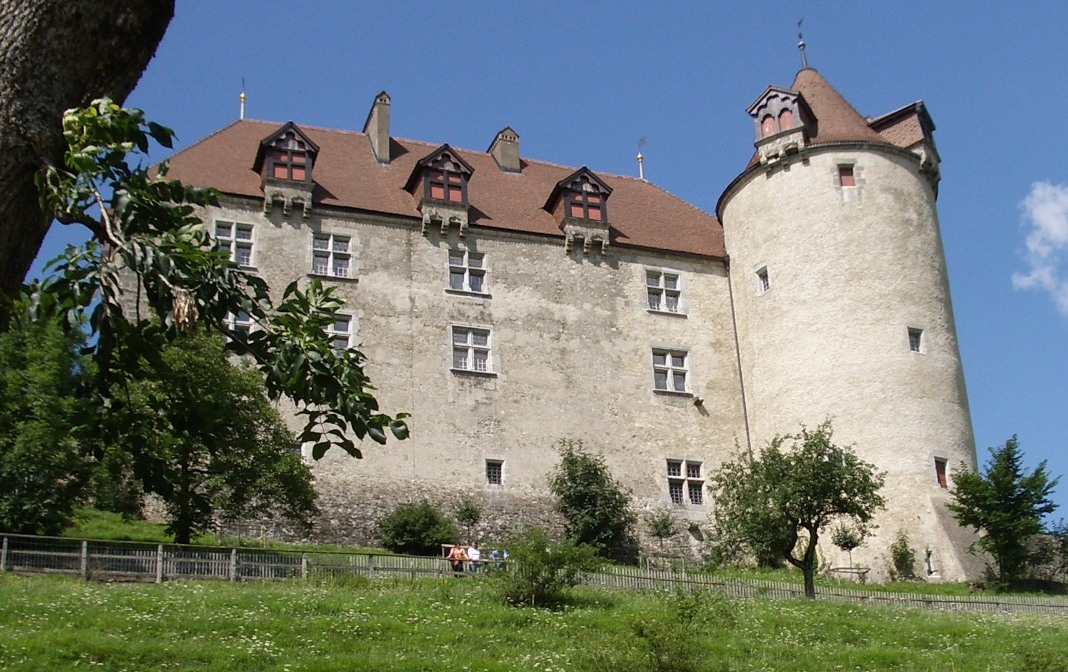
Gruyères Castle

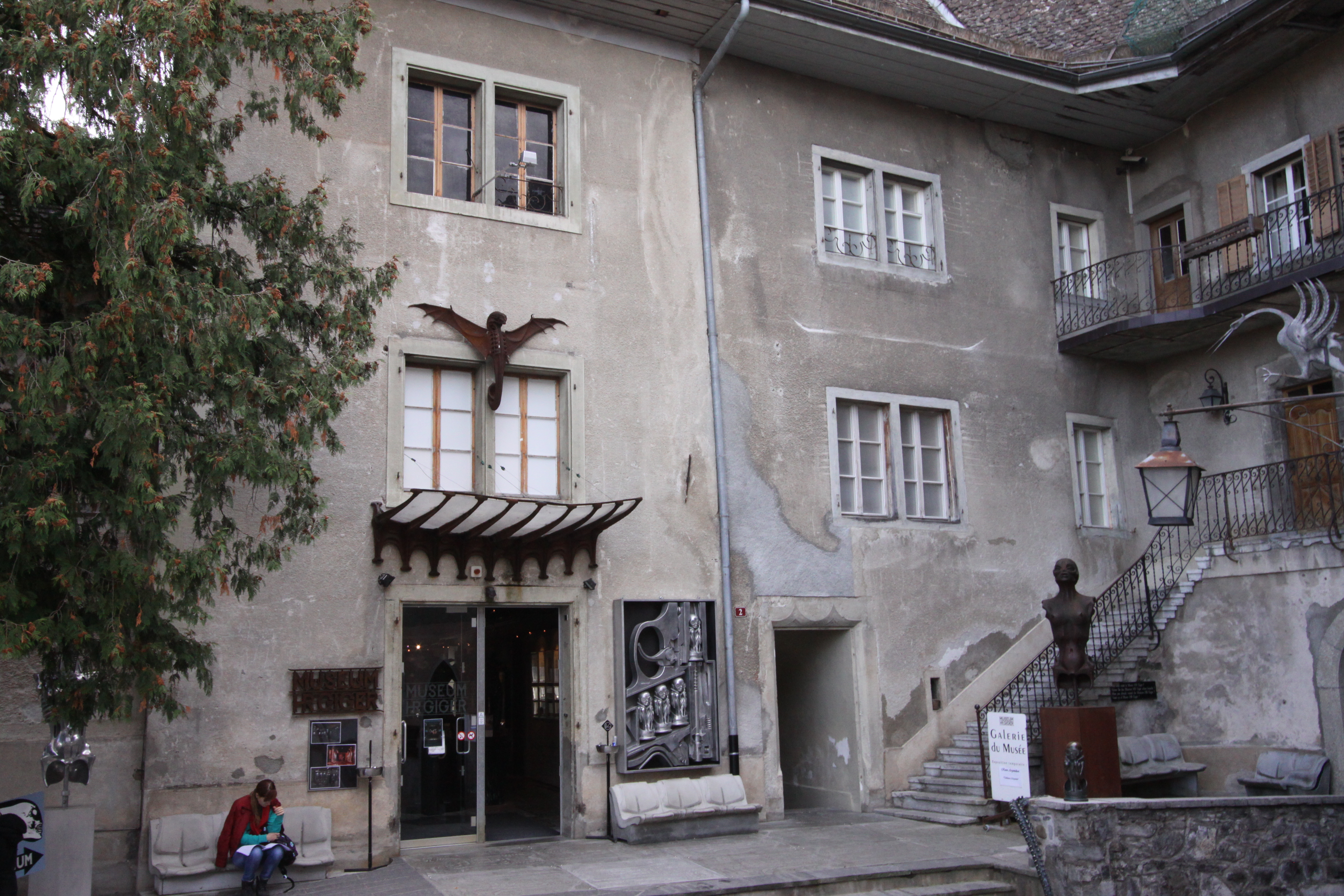
Saint-Germain Castle

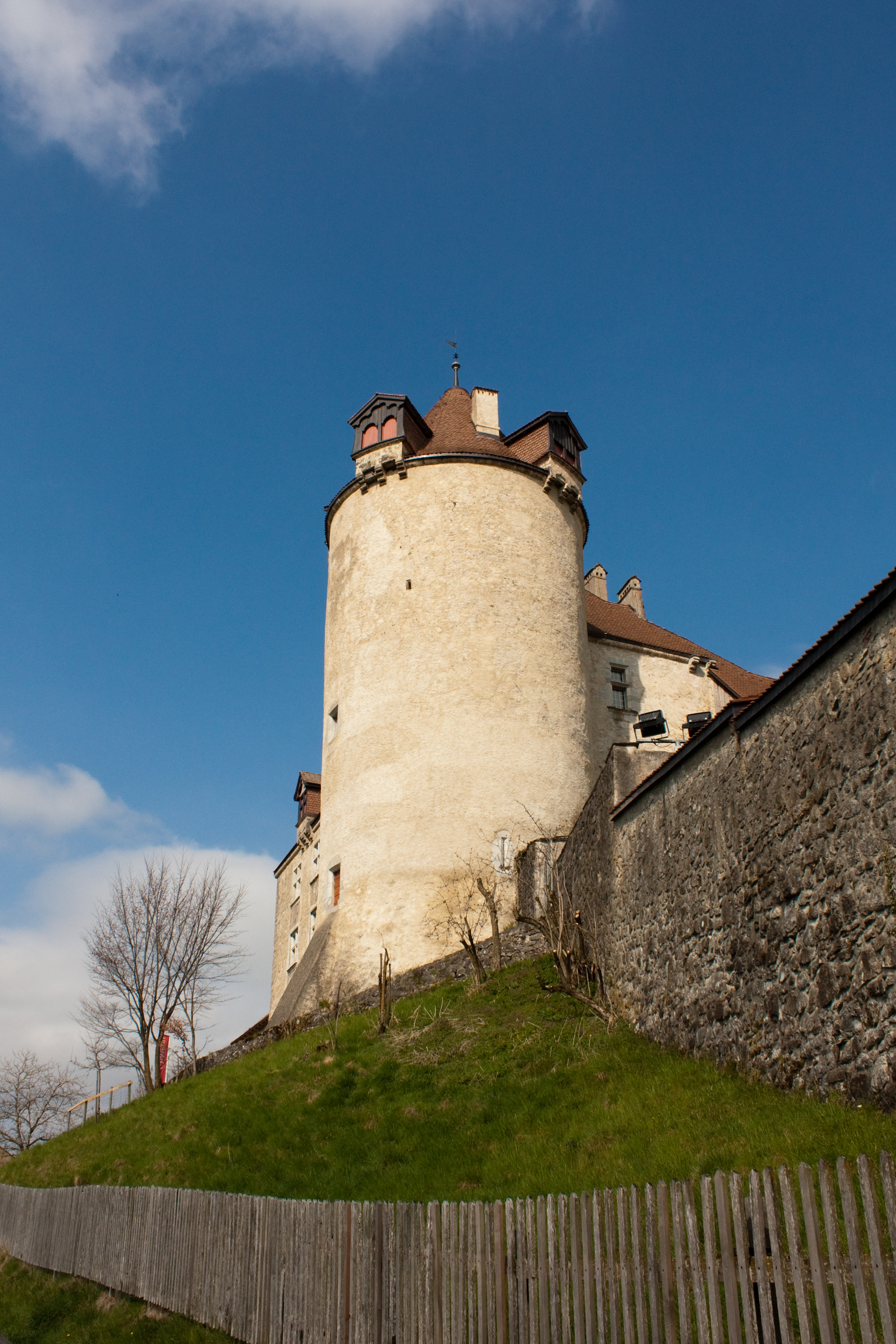
Fortifications

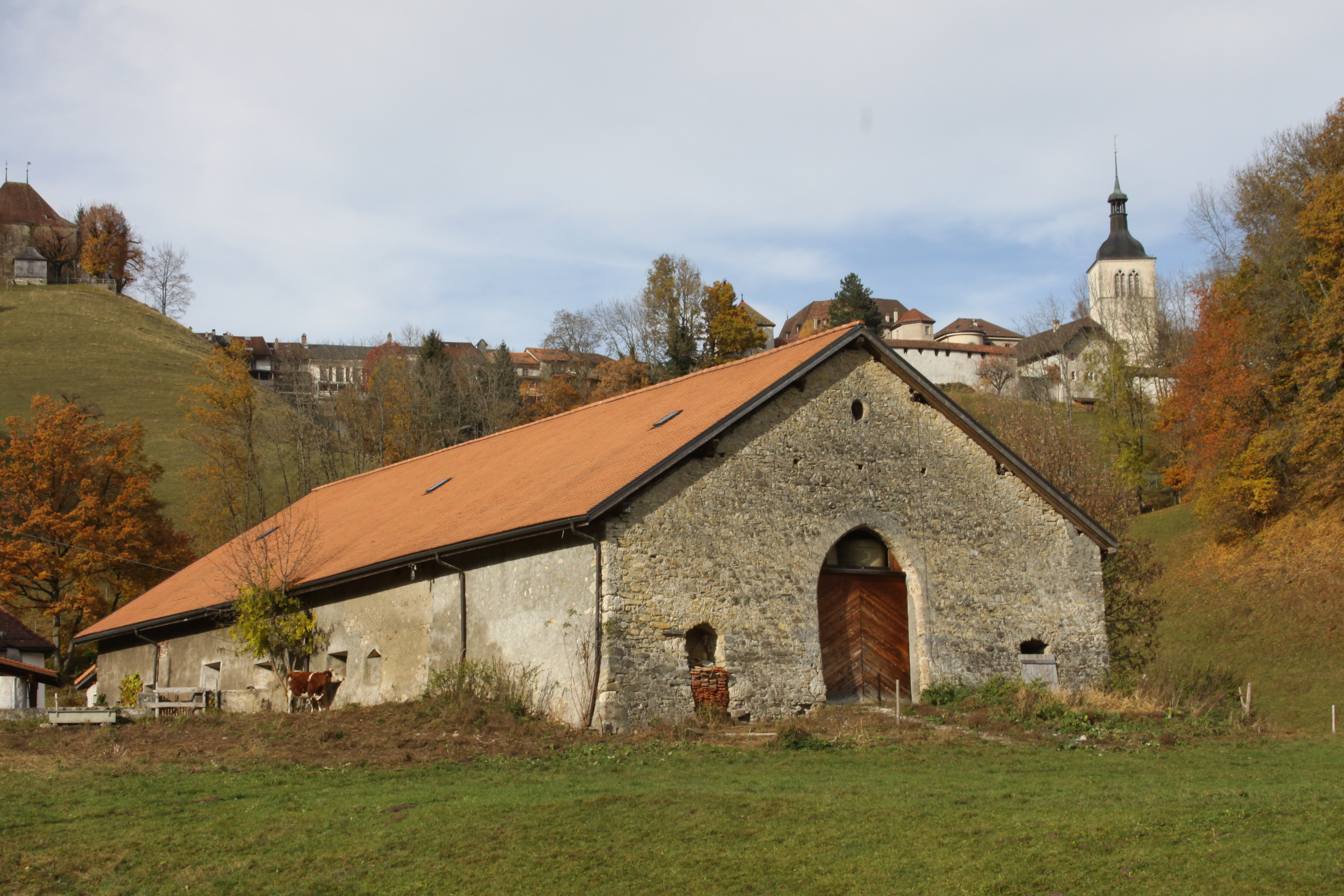
Grange du Laviau at Route de Saussivue 73 A

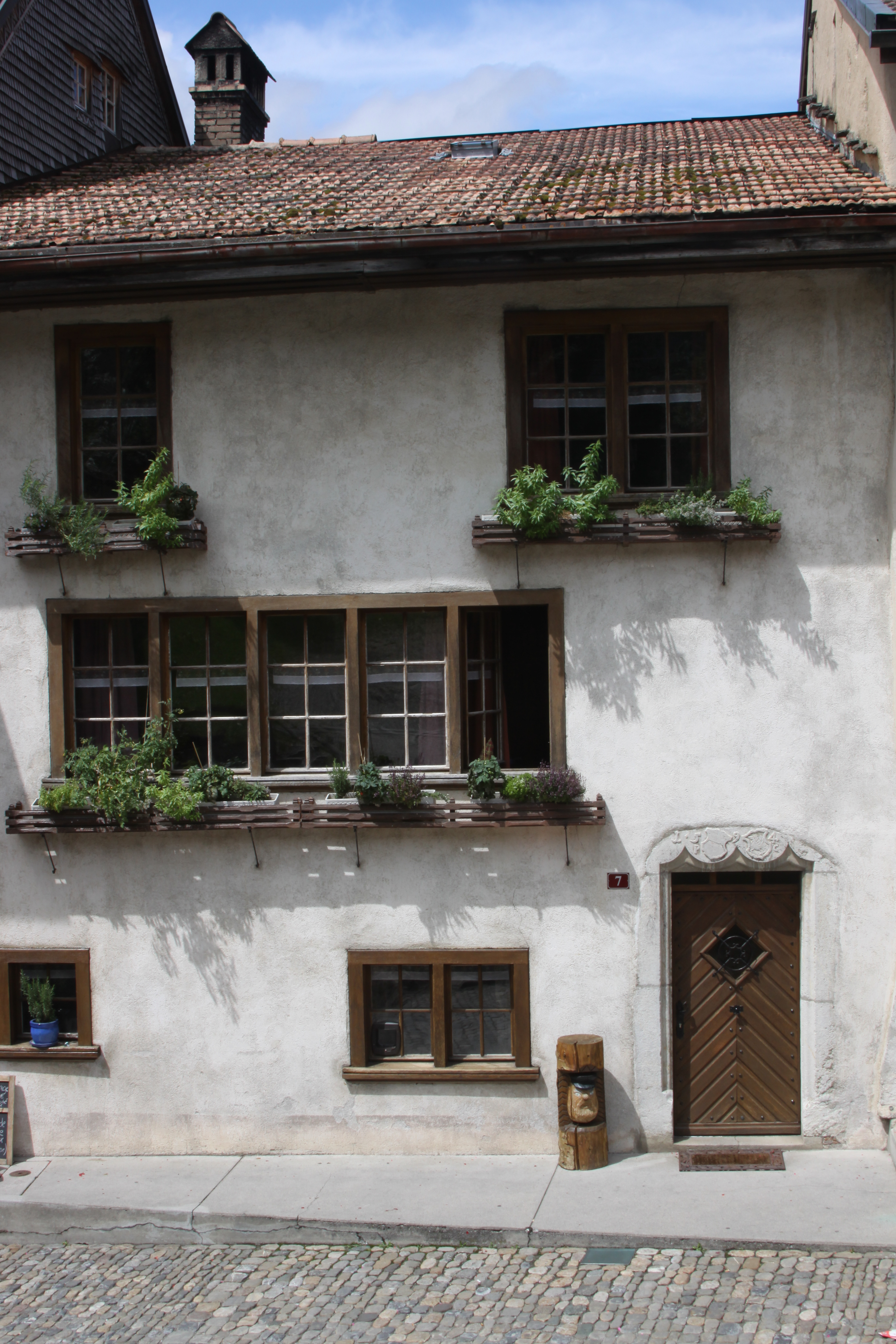
House at Rue du Bourg 7

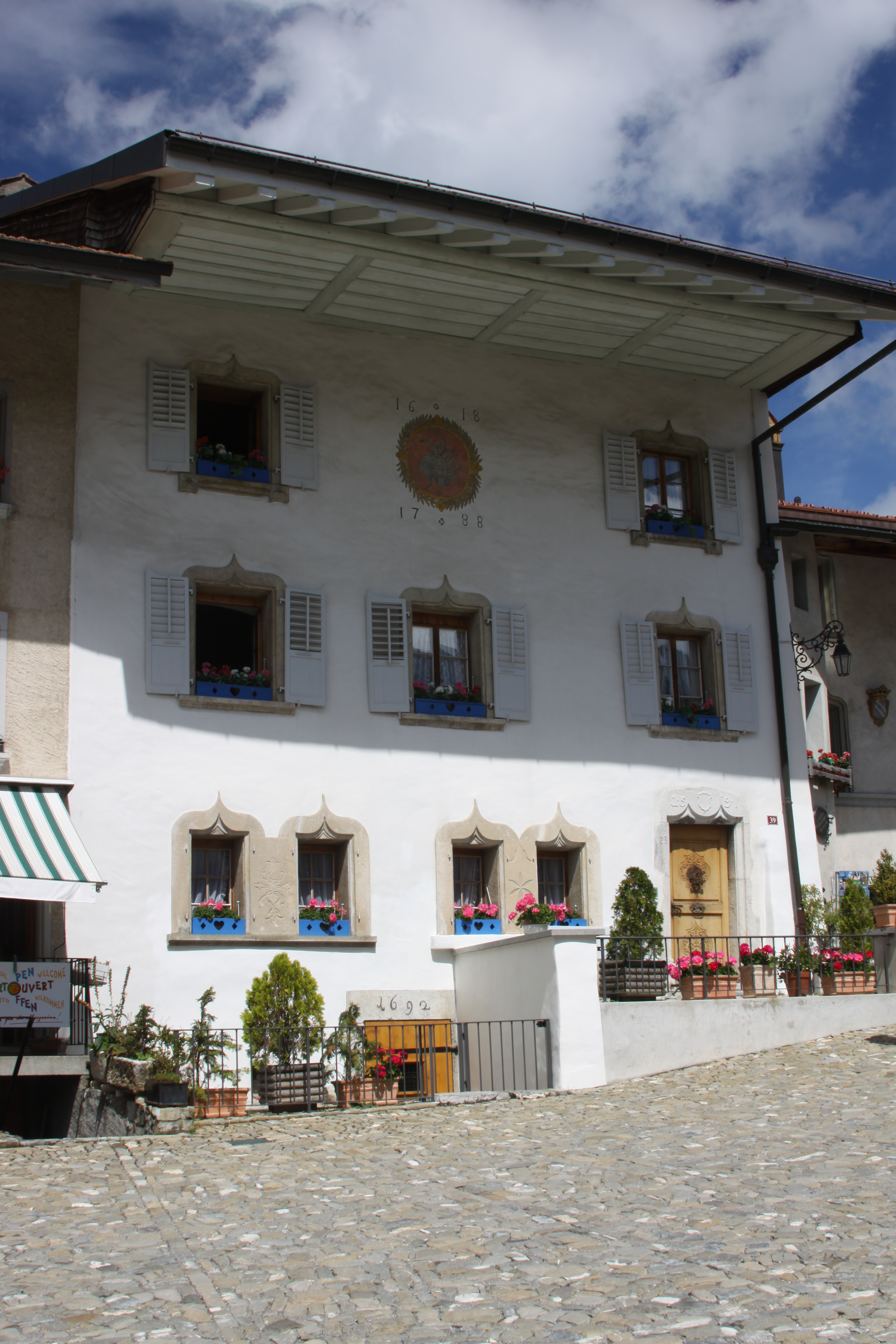
House at Rue du Bourg 39

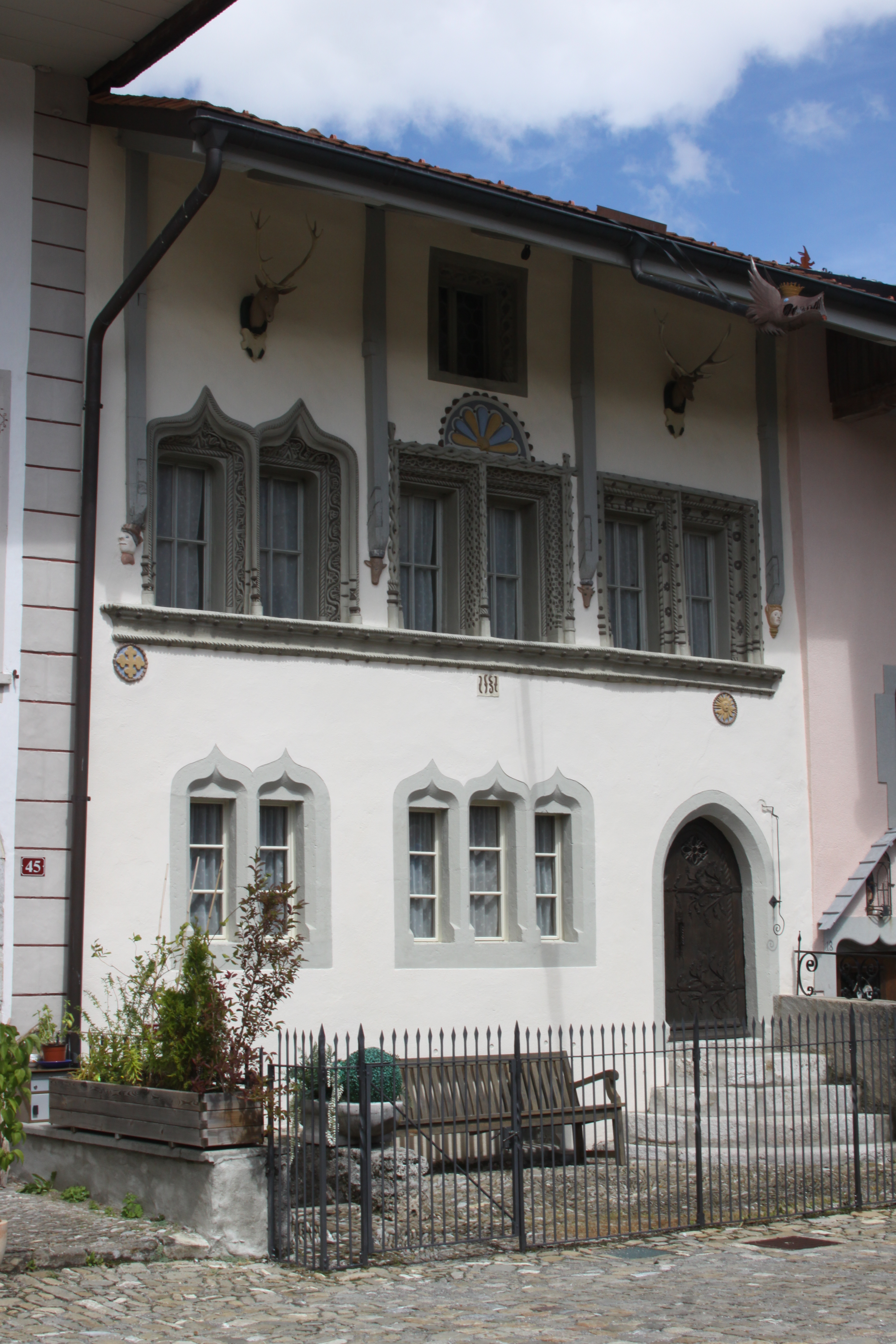
House dite de Chalamala at Rue du Bourg 47

=== Tourism ===
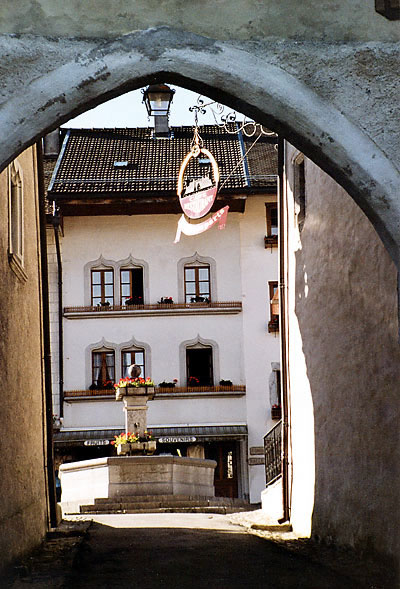
The medieval city

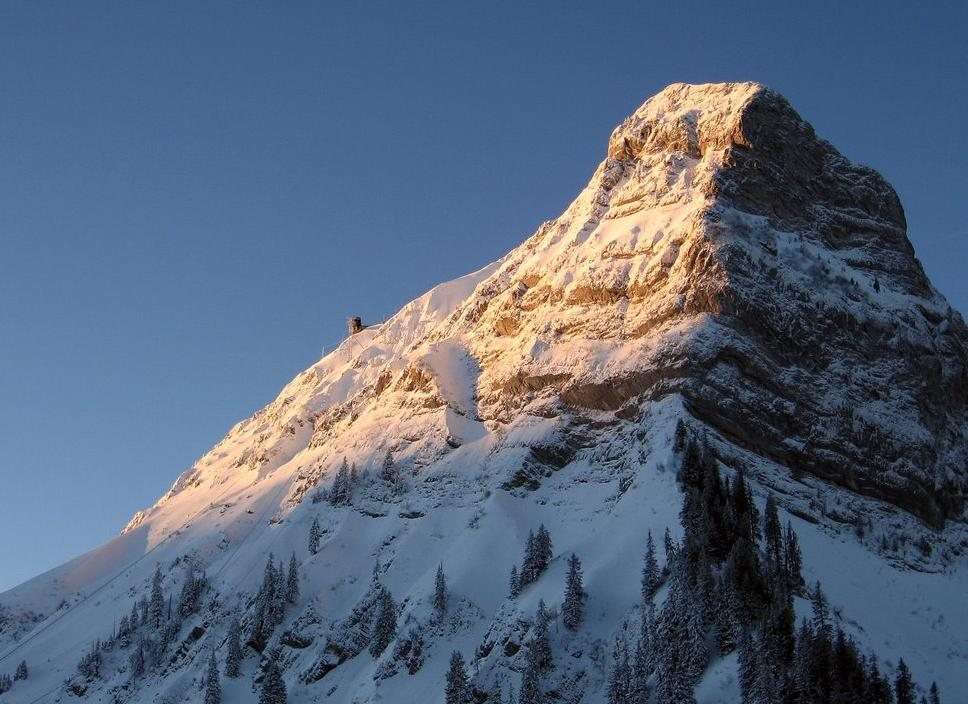
The Moléson

Gruyère cheese is an important factor in supporting the tourist trade in the region. A major tourist attraction is the medieval town of Gruyères with its castle, containing a regional museum and an arts museum. There are cultural activities in the castle (concerts, theater). There is a cheese factory in Pringy which is open to visitors. Nearby is Mont Moléson, a mountain suitable for climbing, or for the less athletic there is a cablecar to the summit which was rebuilt in 1998. The resort town Moléson-Village caters for both summer and winter tourism.

In 1998 Swiss surrealist painter, sculptor and set designer H. R. Giger acquired the Saint-Germain Castle, and it now houses the H. R. Giger Museum and Bar, a permanent repository of his work and is a popular tourist destination. Next to this, there is a museum holding antiquities from Tibet.

=== Main sights ===
The castle was constructed between 1270 and 1282 in the typical square plan of the fortifications in Savoy. The end of the 15th century stands out as the golden age in the history of the counts. In 1476, count Louis takes part in the Burgundy war by the Confederates’ side. Following this deed of valour, modernization works were undertaken. The adjustment of the esplanade with its chapel, the spiral staircase in the courtyard and the transformation of the main building go back to that time. Thus, the castle loses its fortress appearance to become a stately residence. The baroque interiors remind one of the time when the bailiffs sent by Fribourg lived there. The romantic landscapes were painted in the mid-19th century by Jean-Baptiste-Camille Corot, Barthélemy Menn and other artists.

== Politics ==
In the 2011 federal election the most popular party was the SP which received 28.8% of the vote. The next three most popular parties were the CVP (21.5%), the SVP (20.7%) and the FDP (14.4%).

The SPS improved their position in Gruyères rising to first, from third in 2007 (with 21.4%) The CVP moved from first in 2007 (with 27.9%) to second in 2011, the SVP moved from second in 2007 (with 25.0%) to third and the FDP retained about the same popularity (15.9% in 2007). A total of 609 votes were cast in this election, of which 6 or 1.0% were invalid.

== Religion ==
From the 2000 census, 1,261 or 81.6% were Roman Catholic, while 92 or 6.0% belonged to the Swiss Reformed Church. Of the rest of the population, there were 10 members of an Orthodox church (or about 0.65% of the population), and there were 43 individuals (or about 2.78% of the population) who belonged to another Christian church. There were 2 individuals (or about 0.13% of the population) who were Jewish, and 32 (or about 2.07% of the population) who were Islamic. There was 1 individual who belonged to another church. 74 (or about 4.79% of the population) belonged to no church, are agnostic or atheist, and 51 individuals (or about 3.30% of the population) did not answer the question.

== Education ==
In Gruyères about 456 or (29.5%) of the population have completed non-mandatory upper secondary education, and 155 or (10.0%) have completed additional higher education (either university or a Fachhochschule). Of the 155 who completed tertiary schooling, 61.9% were Swiss men, 24.5% were Swiss women, 10.3% were non-Swiss men and 3.2% were non-Swiss women.

The Canton of Fribourg school system provides one year of non-obligatory Kindergarten, followed by six years of Primary school. This is followed by three years of obligatory lower Secondary school where the students are separated according to ability and aptitude. Following the lower Secondary students may attend a three or four year optional upper Secondary school. The upper Secondary school is divided into gymnasium (university preparatory) and vocational programs. After they finish the upper Secondary program, students may choose to attend a Tertiary school or continue their apprenticeship.

During the 2010–11 school year, there were a total of 240 students attending 18 classes in Gruyères. A total of 363 students from the municipality attended any school, either in the municipality or outside of it. There was one kindergarten class with a total of 17 students in the municipality. The municipality had 7 primary classes and 149 students. During the same year, there were 3 lower secondary classes with a total of 31 students. There were 2 vocational upper Secondary classes and were 5 upper Secondary classes, with 40 upper Secondary students and 3 vocational upper Secondary students The municipality had no non-university Tertiary classes, but there were 3 specialized Tertiary students who attended classes in another municipality.

As of 2000, there were 31 students in Gruyères who came from another municipality, while 109 residents attended schools outside the municipality.
