= Gian Paolo Dulbecco =

Italian painter (born 1941)

Gian Paolo Dulbecco (La Spezia,12 September 1941) is an Italian painter.

== Biography ==
Gian Paolo Dulbecco was born in La Spezia in 1941. In 1958 he moved with his family to Milan, where he was a student of Tommaso Gnone, whose teachings inspired him to begin painting and learn drypoint etching techniques. In March 1966 he graduated from the Polytechnic University of Milan, continuing to cultivate his interest in art, even though without any professional art education.

In 1969 he lived in Rome where he got to see the painting of Balthus exhibited at Villa Medici. Afterwards, he moved back to Milan, which was the basis for several trips in Europe. He was particularly inspired by the painting of Delvaux, Magritte and the great Flemish painters he got to see while visiting Belgium.
He began to develop his theme of Stone Ships, as a reminder of the Tiber Island, which is followed by those of Oracles, Nocturnes and the metaphysical Ideal Cities. He also confronted the field of sacred art, especially with the Nativities inspired by the 15th-century Thebaids. In 1975 he settled in Monza.

He took part to numerous exhibitions, both personal and collective, in several Italian cities. In 1984 he received a Cartier Award with the work Stories of the Woods. In 1992 he was among the awardees of Arte magazine. French critic Pierre Restany invited him to exhibit his Tarot series at the group show Art & Tabac, which took place in Rome in 1993 and in the following years in Vienna and Amsterdam.
His paintings were exhibited in London, Freiburg, Porto, at the Italian Cultural Institutes in Lyon, Lisbon and Brussels, and finally in Tokyo. New Japanese exhibitions took place again in 1998 in Yokohama, and in 1999 and 2001 in Tokyo.

Those were the years in which the masque of Pulcinella, interpreted as a universal human archetype, began to appear in his paintings. In the same years, he tackled the themes of the Characters struggling against their own shadow, of Labyrinths and of Mysterious Cages. In the late 1990s, he was inspired by the myth of Atlantis.

In 2002 the Superintendence of Cultural Heritage of Salerno sponsored an anthological exhibition of his work in Ravello, where his paintings were exhibited again with Luzzati in 2005.

In 2012 he is invited by the Panorama Museum to present some works at the group show Dopo de Chirico, dedicated to contemporary Italian metaphysical painting.

Afterwards came a period of secluded work in which he tackled the theme of Invisible Cities.

His solo exhibitions are now increasingly rare, according to an aspiration to a reserved silence and a rejection of the current spectacularizing and business planning of art.
He is an artist whose works, generally restrained in size and often built on the golden section, have been likened by critics to the modes of Magic Realism.

== Collections ==
- Panorama Museum, Bad Frankenhausen, Germany
- Städtische Sammlung Bayreuth, Germany
- Fantastic Art Collection, Gruyères Castle, Switzerland
- Aoyama The Tower, Tokyo
- FAI Heritage (National Trust of Italy), Milan
- Lombardy regional art collection, Palazzo Lombardia, Milan
- Heritage of the Municipality of Monza
- Paul VI Art collection, Concesio, (Brescia)
- Gonzaga Museum, Mantua
- Tarots Museum, Riola di Vergato, (Bologna)
- Mario Novaro Foundation, Genoa
- Heritage of the Municipality of La Spezia
- Museo dei Trasporti, La Spezia
- Pietrasanta City Council art collection
- Cervia City Council art collection
- Vatican Contemporary Art Collection, Rome
- Ravello City Council art collection
- Province of Palermo paintings collection, Palermo

== See also ==
- Magic realism

== Bibliography ==
- Allgemeines Künstlerlexikon, de Gruyter GmbH, Berlin
- Catalogo d’Arte Moderna, Mondadori, Milan
- Art & Tabac, catalogo della mostra al Tabakmuseum, Vienna, 1995
- P. Morselli, F. Gozzi, U. Montanari, Carnevalesca, il travestimento, la festa, catalogo della mostra a Cento, Ed. Siaca, Cento, 2003
- Gian Paolo Dulbecco, La via Crucis per la Chiesa di S.Gemma Galgani in Monza (1983-85), Monza, 2006
- C. Caserta, Pulcinella, viaggio nell’ultimo Novecento - Dulbecco, Lubelli, Luzzati, Mautone, ESI, Napoli, 2006, ISBN 88-495-1256-2
- Dopo de Chirico. La pittura metafisica italiana contemporanea. Catalog - Panorama Museum, Bad Frankenhausen, 2012, ISBN 978-3-938049-23-5
- C.Caserta, Gian Paolo Dulbecco, antologia della pittura, Edizioni Scientifiche Italiane, Napoli, 2016, ISBN 978-88-495-3028-5
- A.Sartori: Catalogo Sartori d'arte moderna e contemporanea - 2018, Archivio Sartori Editore, Mantova, 2018
- N.Del Buono: The best of the year, 90 Italian highlights, AD (Italy), Nov. 2019
- V.P.Cremolini, I mondi di Dulbecco, Edizioni del Porticciolo, La Spezia, 2022 ISBN 978-88-96357-62-0
