= Moléson-sur-Gruyères =

Coordinates: 46.56681°N 7.03725°E

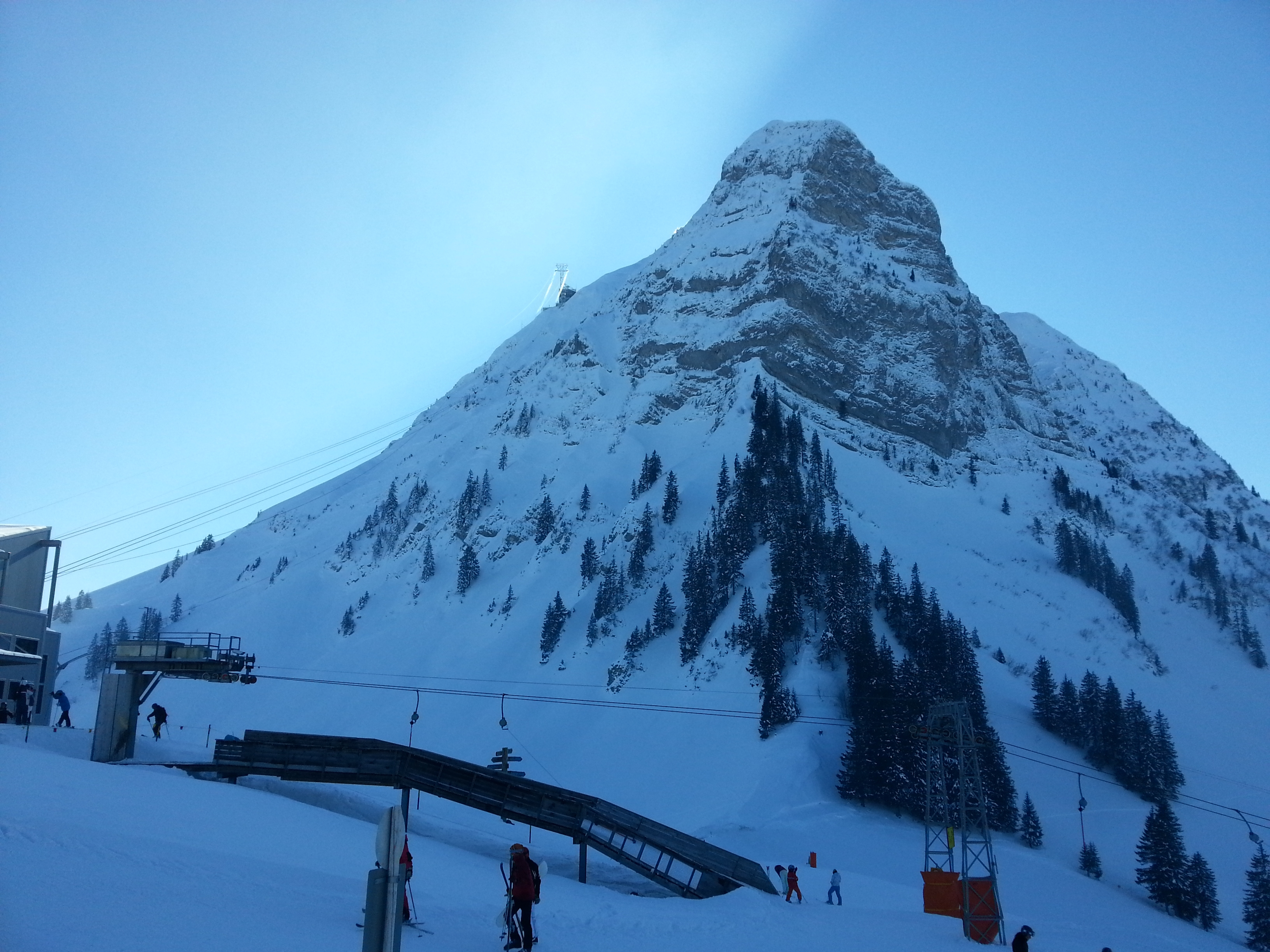
The Moléson seen near the departure of the cable car

Moléson-sur-Gruyères (also known as Moléson-Village) is a village in the Swiss Alps, located in the canton of Fribourg. The village is situated in the municipality of Gruyères, south of Bulle, at a height of 1,132 metres above sea level.

The village sits at the foot of the Moléson (2,002 m) which can be easily reached by Funiculaire Moléson-sur-Gruyères – Plan-Francey and an aerial cable car. In winter the area functions as a ski resort.
