= Gruyères Castle =

Castle in Gruyères, Fribourg, Switzerland

- Château de Gruyères
- Gruyères
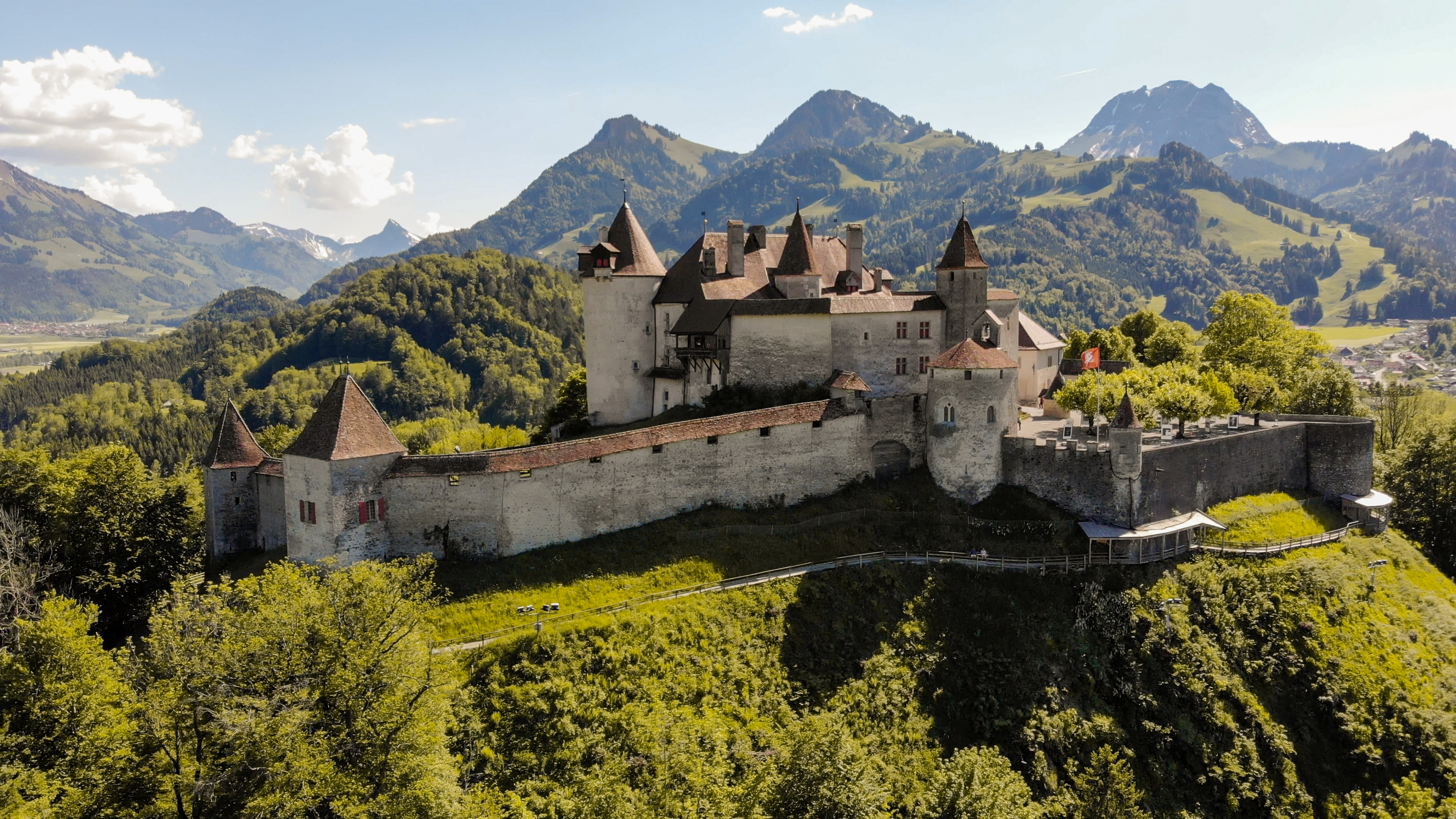
- Le château de Gruyères

Site information
- Type: Square castle
- Code: CH-FR
- Condition: Now a museum

Location
- Coordinates: 46°35′05″N 7°05′02″E

Site history
- Built: 1270–82

Aerial views of Gruyères Castle, Gruyères, Fribourg, Switzerland.

The Castle of Gruyères (in French: château de Gruyères), located in the medieval town of Gruyères, Fribourg, is one of the most famous in Switzerland. It is a Swiss heritage site of national significance.

== History ==
The building was built between 1270 and 1282, following the typical square plan of the fortifications in Savoy. It was the property of the Counts of Gruyères until the bankruptcy of Count Michel in 1554. His creditors, the cantons of Fribourg and Bern, divided his earldom. From 1555 to 1798, the castle was the residence of the bailiffs and then to the prefects sent by Fribourg. In 1849, the castle was sold to the Bovy and Balland families, who used the castle as their summer residency and restored it, establishing an artists' colony. The castle was repurchased by the canton of Fribourg in 1938, made into a museum, and opened to the public. Since 1993, a foundation ensures the conservation as well as the highlighting of the building and the art collection.

== Museum ==
The castle is home to three capes of the Order of the Golden Fleece. They were part of the war booty captured by the Swiss Confederates (which included troops from Gruyères) at the Battle of Morat against Charles the Bold, Duke of Burgundy in 1476. As Charles was then celebrating the anniversary of his father's death, one of the capes is a black velvet sacerdotal vestment with Philip the Good's emblem sewn into it.

A collection of landscapes by 19th century artists Jean-Baptiste-Camille Corot, Barthélemy Menn and others are on display in the castle.

An international collection of Fantastic Art is also exhibited (José Roosevelt, Gian Paolo Dulbecco, Vincent Amas, Patrick Woodroffe, Milan Goldschmiedt).

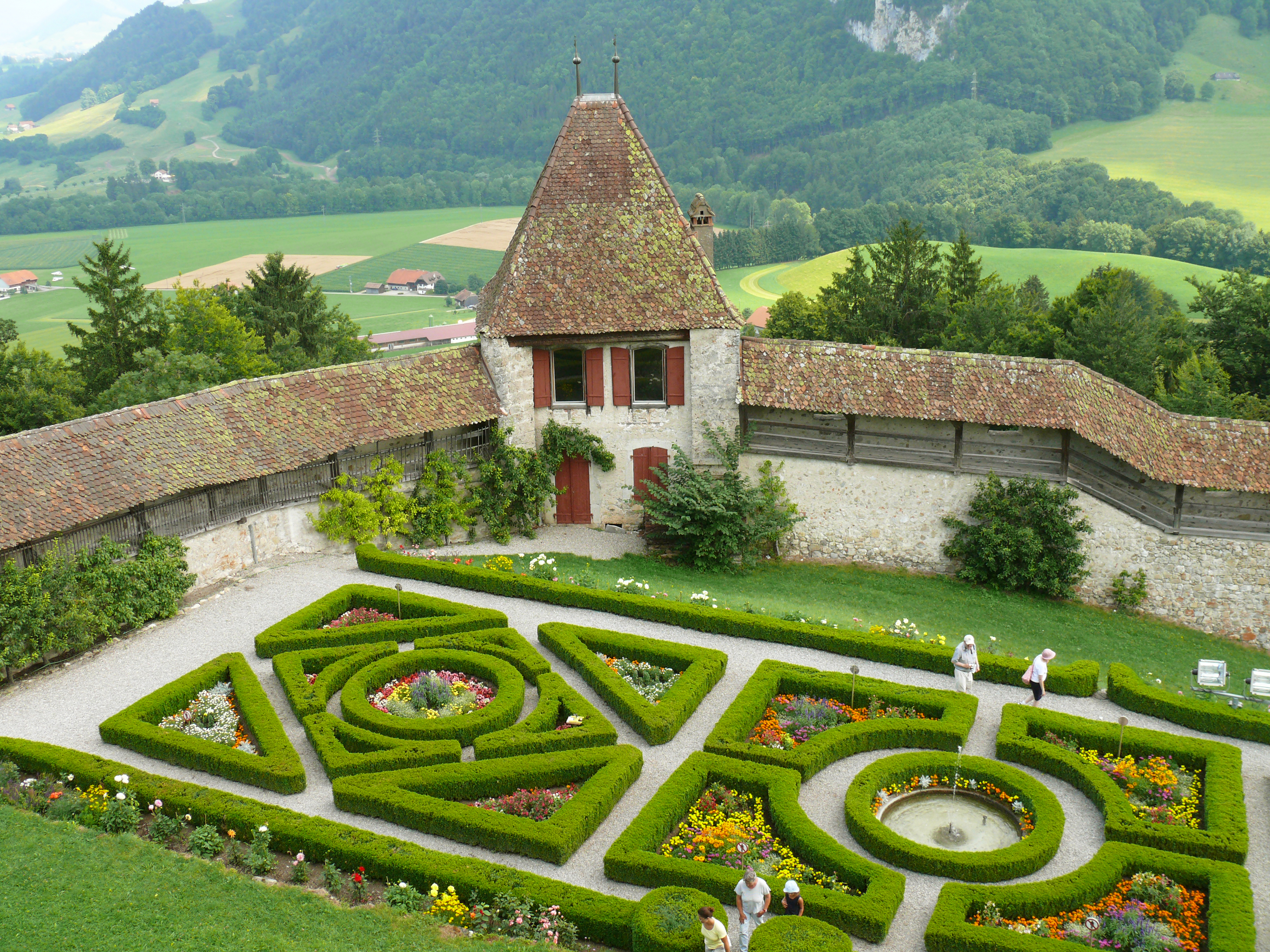
The French garden behind the château

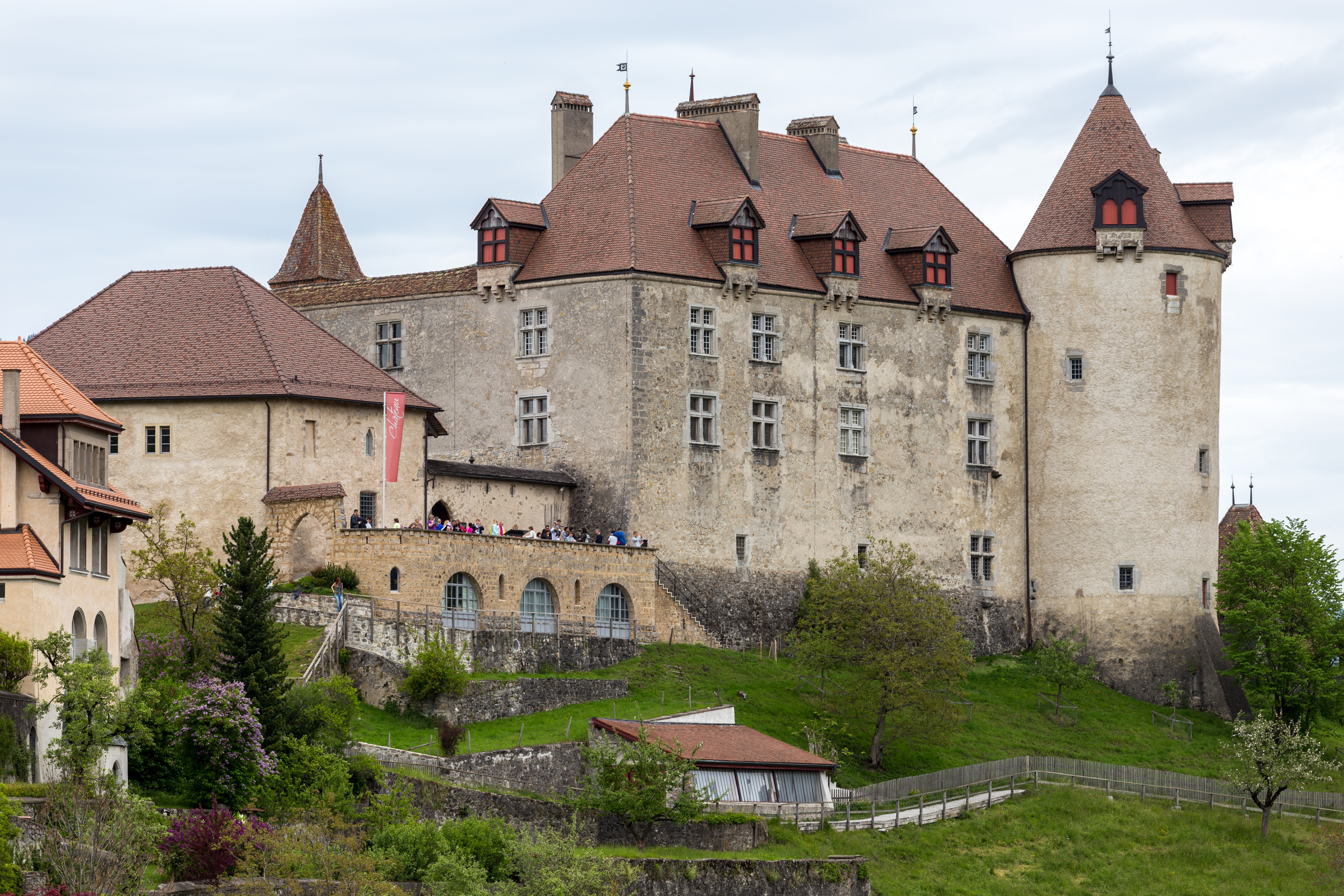
South-west view
