= Moléson =

Mountain in Switzerland

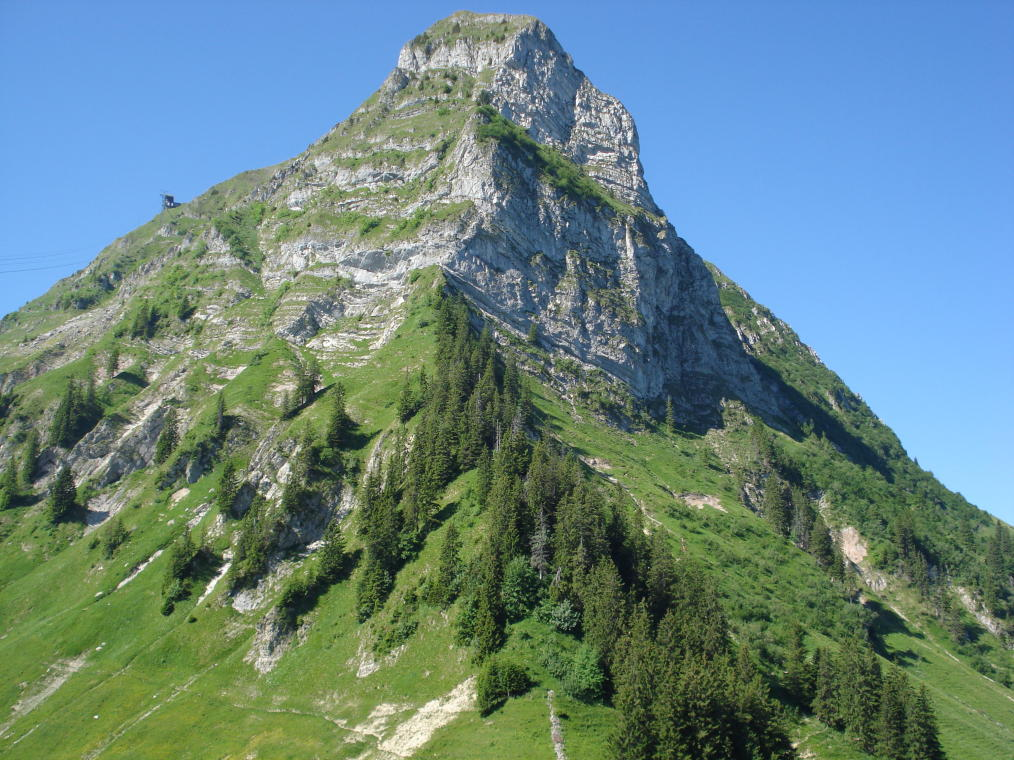

Highest point
- Elevation: 2,002 m (6,568 ft)
- Prominence: 509 m (1,670 ft)
- Parent peak: Rochers de Naye
- Coordinates: 46°32′55.6″N 7°1′1.7″E

Geography
- Location within Switzerland
- Location: Fribourg, Switzerland
- Parent range: Vaud Alps

The Moléson (French: Le Moléson) (2,002 metres (6,568 ft)) is a mountain of the Swiss Prealps, overlooking the region of Gruyère in the canton of Fribourg. It lies at the northern end of the chain between Lake Geneva and the valley of the Sarine.

The summit of the mountain can be easily reached, a cable car station being located near the summit at 1,982 metres (6,503 ft) as well as a meteorological station and a restaurant. From the village of Moléson-sur-Gruyères Funiculaire Moléson-sur-Gruyères – Plan-Francey leads to Plan-Francey at 1,517 metres (4,977 ft), from where the aerial cable car starts. The mountain can also be climbed by a via ferrata and hiking trails.

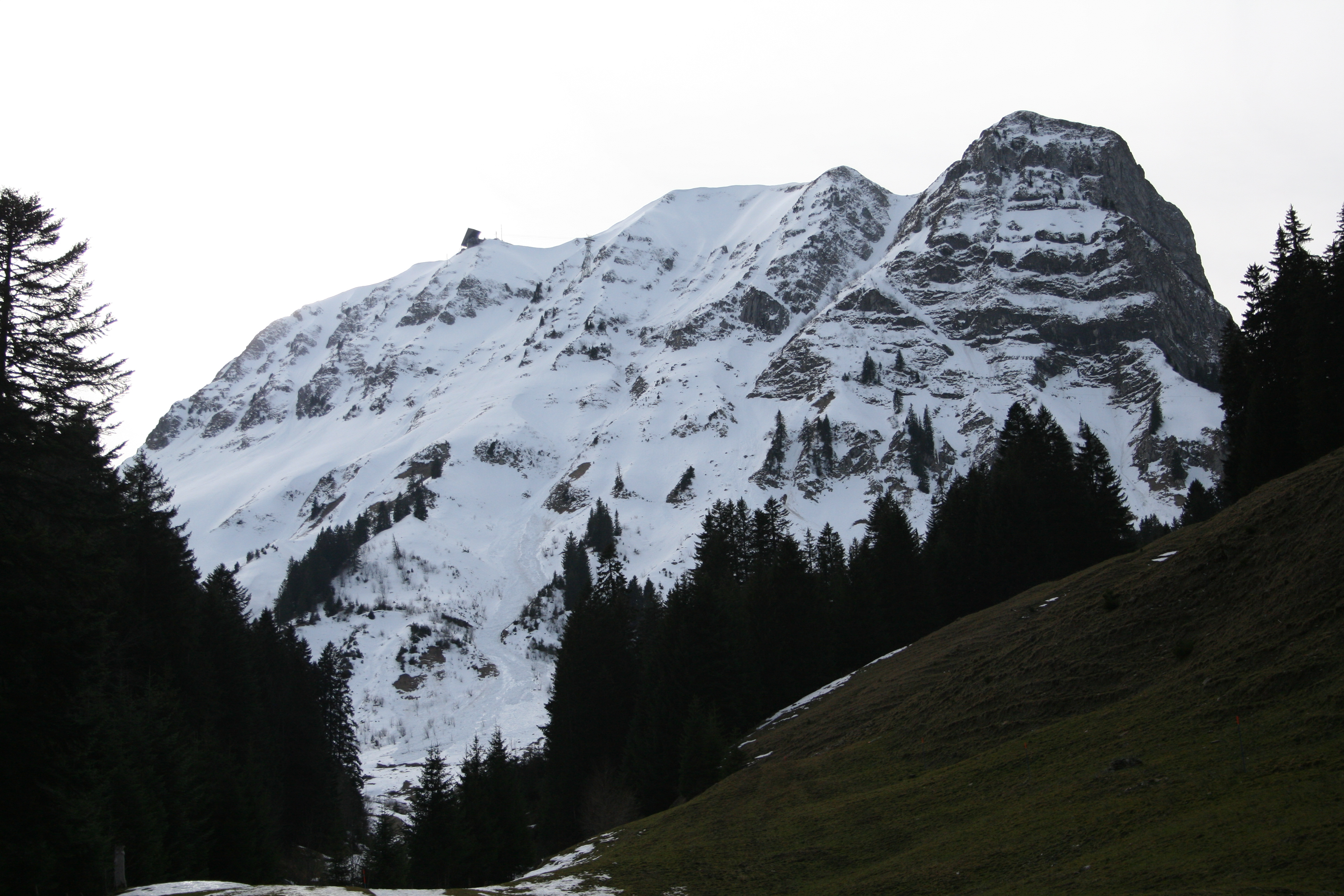
The Moléson in winter

== Climate ==
Climate data for Le Moléson, elevation 1,974 m (6,476 ft), (1991–2020)
Month	Jan	Feb	Mar	Apr	May	Jun	Jul	Aug	Sep	Oct	Nov	Dec	Year
Mean daily maximum °C (°F)	−0.3 (31.5)	−0.5 (31.1)	1.6 (34.9)	4.4 (39.9)	8.5 (47.3)	12.3 (54.1)	14.5 (58.1)	14.5 (58.1)	11.0 (51.8)	8.1 (46.6)	3.3 (37.9)	0.9 (33.6)	6.5 (43.7)
Daily mean °C (°F)	−2.9 (26.8)	−3.4 (25.9)	−1.5 (29.3)	1.0 (33.8)	4.9 (40.8)	8.6 (47.5)	10.6 (51.1)	10.8 (51.4)	7.4 (45.3)	4.8 (40.6)	0.4 (32.7)	−1.9 (28.6)	3.2 (37.8)
Mean daily minimum °C (°F)	−5.6 (21.9)	−6.1 (21.0)	−4.1 (24.6)	−1.6 (29.1)	2.1 (35.8)	5.7 (42.3)	7.6 (45.7)	8.0 (46.4)	4.8 (40.6)	2.2 (36.0)	−2.2 (28.0)	−4.7 (23.5)	0.5 (32.9)
Average precipitation mm (inches)	60.3 (2.37)	65.5 (2.58)	72.2 (2.84)	80.0 (3.15)	127.6 (5.02)	129.5 (5.10)	146.2 (5.76)	140.4 (5.53)	103.2 (4.06)	90.7 (3.57)	80.3 (3.16)	89.9 (3.54)	1,185.8 (46.69)
Average precipitation days (≥ 1.0 mm)	9.6	8.6	10.1	10.1	13.5	12.7	11.5	11.8	10.0	10.4	9.8	11.2	129.3
Average relative humidity (%)	65	67	73	77	81	82	81	79	80	72	70	67	74
Mean monthly sunshine hours	125.7	133.0	161.1	164.8	164.9	181.1	198.2	197.5	169.0	157.8	117.4	107.7	1,878.2
Percentage possible sunshine	46	47	45	42	38	41	44	48	47	48	43	42	44
Source 1: NOAA
Source 2: MeteoSwiss

== See also ==
- List of mountains of Switzerland accessible by public transport
