= Fribourg =

Fribourg Freiburg
- Municipality
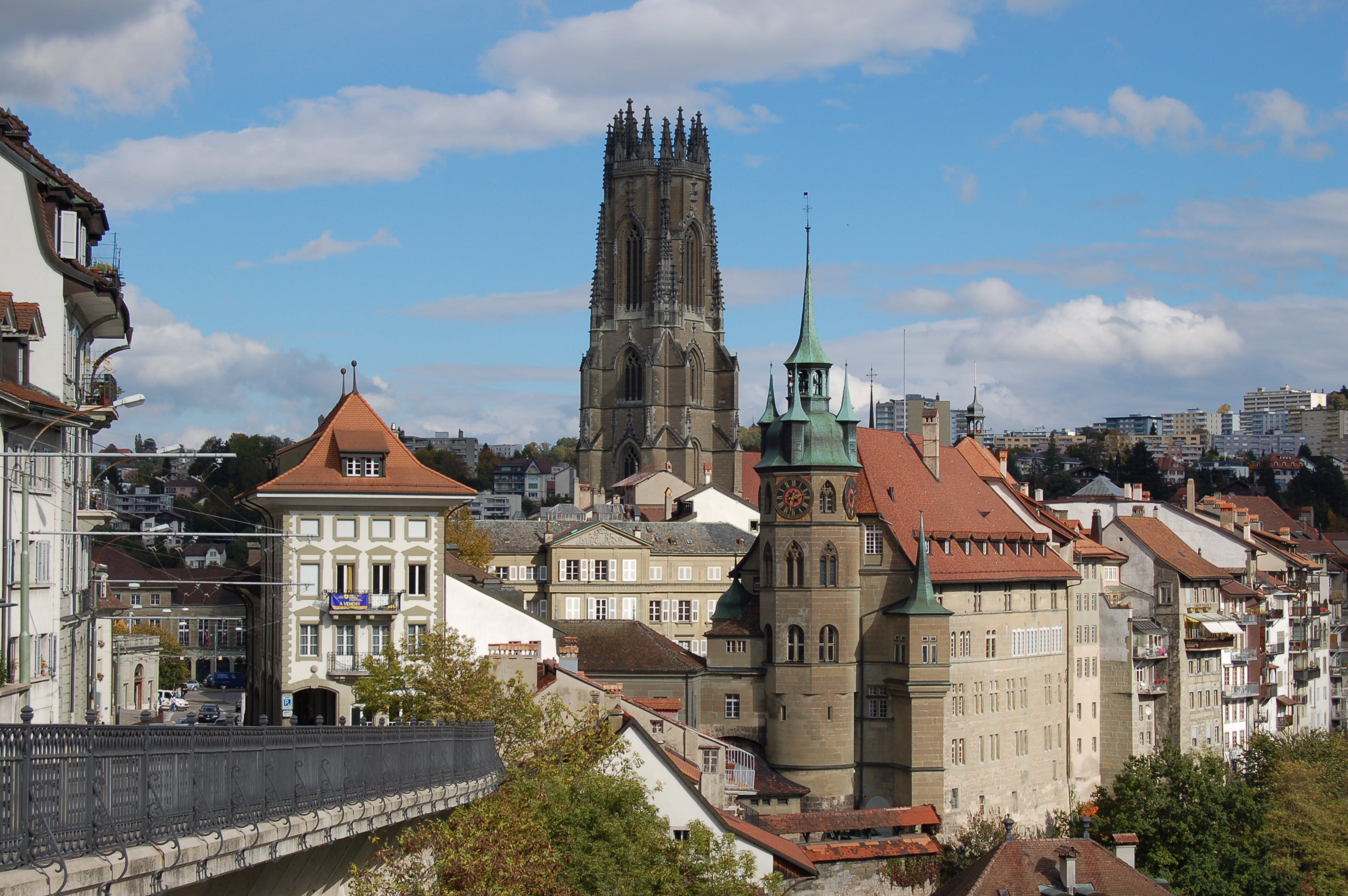
- Autumn in Fribourg

- Flag Coat of arms
- Location of Fribourg
- Location within Switzerland Location within Canton of Fribourg
- Coordinates: 46°48′N 7°09′E
- Country: Switzerland
- Canton: Fribourg
- District: La Sarine

Government
  - Executive: Conseil communal / Gemeinderat with 5 members
  - Mayor: Syndic/Ammann (list); Thierry Steiert SPS/PSS (as of 2016)
  - Parliament: Conseil général / Generalrat with 80 members

Area
  - Total: 9.32 km^{2} (3.60 sq mi)
- Elevation: 610 m (2,000 ft)
- Highest elevation (Schönberg): 702 m (2,303 ft)
- Lowest elevation (La Sarine (river)): 531 m (1,742 ft)

Population (December 2020)
  - Total: 38,039
  - Density: 4,080/km^{2} (10,600/sq mi)
- Demonym(s): French: Fribourgeois(e); German: Freiburger(in)
- Time zone: UTC+01:00 (CET)
  - Summer (DST): UTC+02:00 (CEST)
- Postal code: 1700
- SFOS number: 2196
- ISO 3166 code: CH-FR
- Localities: Bourg (Burg), Beauregard, Jura, Pérolles, Neuveville (Neustadt), Auge (Au), Schoenberg (Schönberg), Places (Plätze), Bourguillon (Bürglen)
- Surrounded by: Düdingen, Givisiez, Granges-Paccot, Marly, Pierrafortscha, Sankt Ursen, Tafers, Villars-sur-Glâne
- Twin towns: Rueil-Malmaison (France)
- Website: ville-fribourg.ch

Fribourg (Note: /friːˈbʊər/ free-BOOR; French: [fʁibuʁ]; Arpitan: Fribôrg or Friboua, pronounced [fʁiˈbwa]; Italian: Friburgo [friˈburɡo] or dated Friborgo; Romansh: Friburg.) or Freiburg (Note: Longer German name: Freiburg im Üechtland, pronounced [ˈfraɪbʊrɡ (ɪm ˈyːəçtland)]; Swiss German: Frybùrg [ˈfrib̥ʊrɡ̊]. This name is used to distinguish from other places named Freiburg, particularly Freiburg im Breisgau.) is a municipality, a town and the capital of the Swiss canton of Fribourg and district of La Sarine. Located on both sides of the river Saane/Sarine, on the Swiss Plateau, it is a major economic, administrative and educational centre on the cultural border between German-speaking and French-speaking Switzerland. Its Old City, one of the best-maintained in Switzerland, sits on a small rocky hill above the valley of the Sarine. In 2018, it had a population of 38,365.

== History ==
=== Prehistory ===
The region around Fribourg has been settled since the Neolithic period, although few remains have been found. These include some flint tools found near Bourguillon, as well as a stone hatchet and bronze tools. A river crossing was located in the area during the Roman Era. The main activity in the Swiss plateau went through the area to the north, however, and was instead centered around the valley of the river Broye and Aventicum. Therefore, only a few remains from the Roman era have been found in Fribourg. These include the traces of a wall foundation on the plains near Pérolles.

=== Middle Ages ===
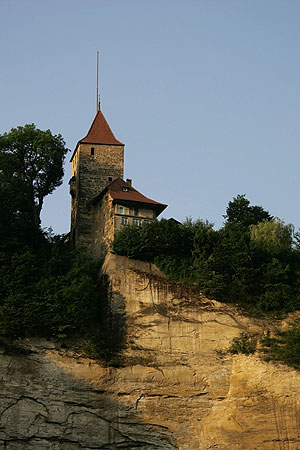
Fribourg Tour de Bourguillon

The town was founded as Freiburg in 1157 by Berthold IV, Duke of Zähringen. Its name is derived from German frei (free) and Burg (fort). Its most ancient part is conveniently located on a former peninsula of the river Sarine, protected on three sides by steep cliffs. The easily defended city helped the Dukes of Zähringen to strengthen and extend their power in the Swiss plateau in the area between the Aare and La Sarine.

Beginning at the time of its inception, Fribourg built a city-state; initially, the land it controlled lay some distance away. When the dukes of Zähringen died out in 1218, the city was transferred to the related Kyburg family. They granted the city its former privileges and wrote the municipal laws in the so-called Handfeste in 1249, in which the legal, institutional and economic organizations were established. Several treaties with neighbouring city-states, including Avenches (1239), Bern (1243), and Morat (Murten) (1245), were signed at this time.

The city was sold to the Habsburgs in 1277. Trade and industry began as early as the mid-13th century. In the early period, Fribourg consisted of four distinct inner city districts: Burg, Au, La Neuveville, and Spital. The city developed rapidly, which led to its first expansion: the Burg district expanded to the west in 1224, a town was established across the river in 1254, and in 1280 development began near Place Python. These expansions reflect the economic boom in Fribourg. The 14th century was dominated by trade, and cloth and leather production, which brought the city renown in Central Europe by 1370. In 1339, Fribourg participated alongside the Habsburgs and the County of Burgundy in the Battle of Laupen against Bern and its Swiss Confederacy allies.

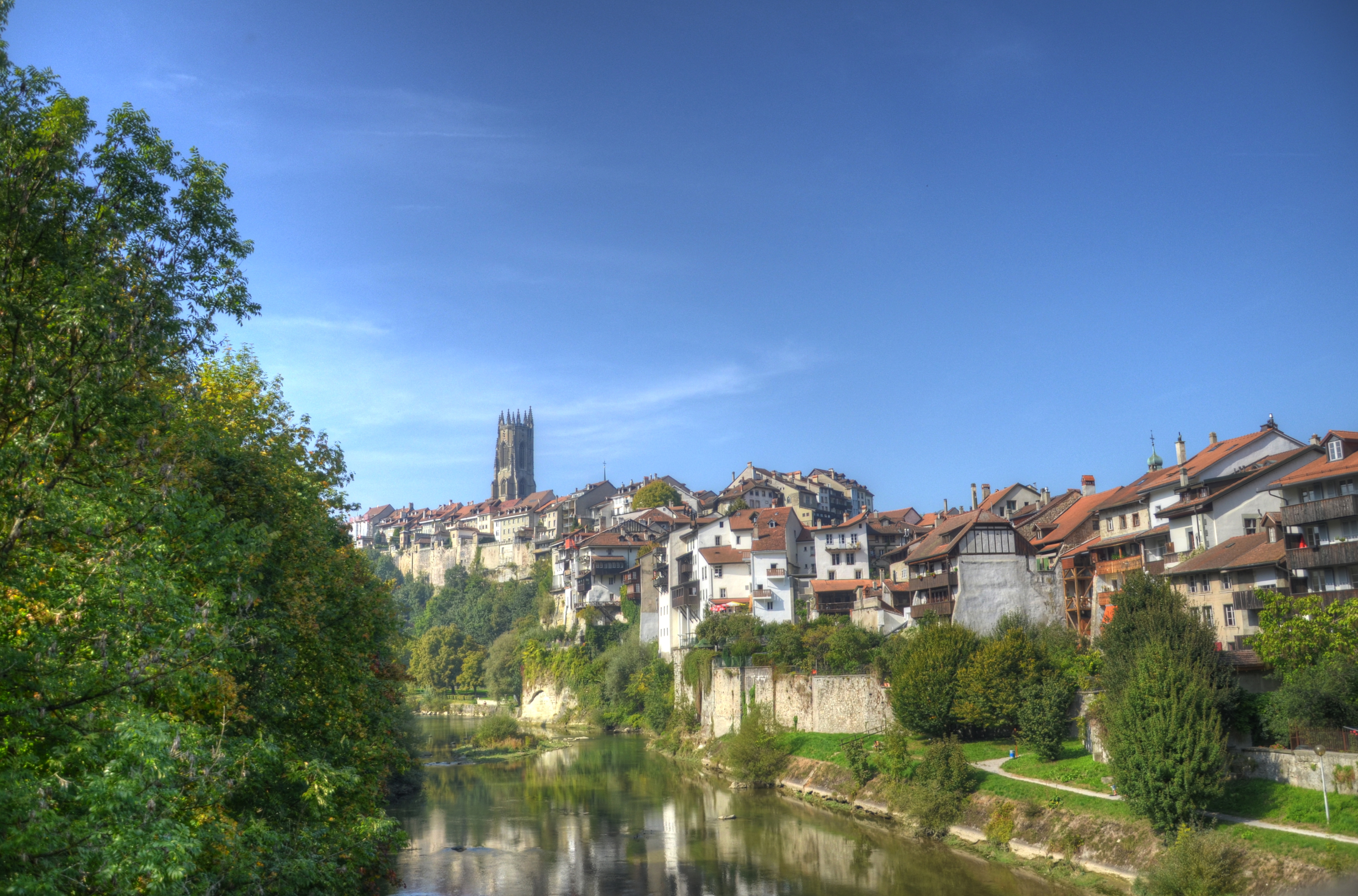
Fribourg

The treaty with Bern was renewed in 1403. The leaders of the city began a territorial acquisition, in which they gradually brought more nearby land under their control. This laid the ground-work for the Canton of Fribourg. By 1442 the city had control of all the land within about 20 kilometres (12 mi), on both sides of the Saane. It was therefore directly controlled by the city leaders, not by any intermediate administration.

The mid-15th century was shaped by various military conflicts. First, considerable losses in a war against Savoy had to be made good. The Savoyard influence on the city grew, and the Habsburgs ceded it to them in 1452. It remained under the control of Savoy until the Burgundian Wars in 1477. As an ally of Bern, Fribourg participated in the war against Charles I of Burgundy, thereby bringing more land under its control.

After the city was released from the sphere of influence of Savoy, it attained the status of Free Imperial City in 1478. The city and its canton joined the Swiss Confederation in 1481, and has long influenced Swiss and European Catholicism. In the 16th century, Fribourg continued to grow, first following the invasion of Pays de Vaud in 1536 with the help of Bern, and then in 1554 through the annexation of land formerly controlled by the Count of Gruyère.

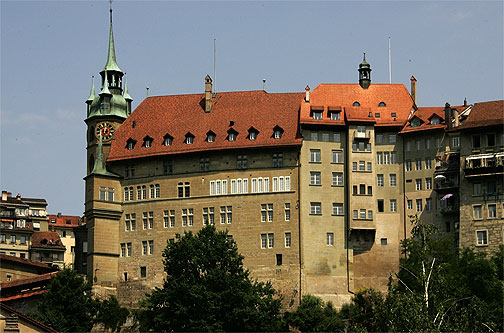
Fribourg City Hall

Several prominent families developed as a result of the cloth and leather trade, beginning in the 14th century, including Gottrau, Lanthen, Affry, Diesbach (originally from Bern), von der Weid, Fegeli, and Weck. Together with the local nobles (the Maggenberg, Düddingen/Velga, Montenach, Englisberg and Praroman families) they formed the 15th century patrician class. This contributed to the decline of the cloth trade, however, as the families involved in the industry began to be more concerned with governing the city and its surrounding possessions.

An important milestone for the politics of the city was reached in 1627, when the patricians drew up a new constitution, in which they declared that they were the only people capable of ruling the city, and thereby took control of all voting rights. This consolidated the oligarchy which had begun to form as early as the 15th century.

=== Importance of monasteries and churches ===
The monasteries of Fribourg have always formed a centre of religious culture, which includes architecture, sculpture and painting, and have contributed to the culture of the city. The Franciscan monastery was donated by Jakob von Riggisberg in 1256. In early times, it was closely associated with the city council, because it housed the city archives and its monastery church was used for town meetings until 1433.

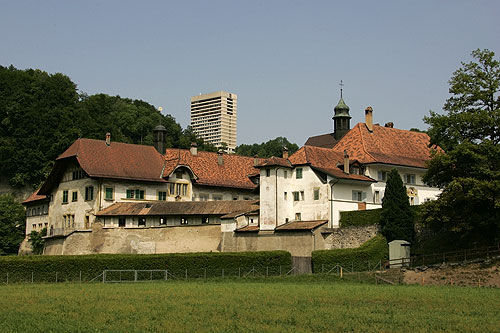
Maigrauge Abbey in Fribourg

Similarly, the Augustinian monastery was founded in the mid-13th century, and enjoyed the support of the noble Velga family for a long time. Additionally, La Maigrauge Abbey has existed since 1255, and has belonged to the Cistercians since 1262. An important institution was the public hospital, opened in the mid-13th century, which provided services for the poor.

During the Reformation, Fribourg remained Catholic, although it was nearly surrounded by the Protestant Bern. This led to repeated conflicts over religion in border regions, and in areas controlled jointly by Fribourg and Bern. The city was a major centre of the Counter-Reformation. At the end of the 16th century and the beginning of the 17th, new monasteries were established in the city, including: a Capuchin monastery (1608), another on Bisemberg (1621), an Ursuline monastery (1634), and a Visitandine monastery (1635). The most influential monastery, however, was that of the Jesuits, which contributed to a large extent to the advancement and prosperity of the city. It established the College of Saint Michael in 1582, the theological faculty of which formed the basis of the University of Fribourg. The concept of an objective press was also begun by the Jesuits.

In 1613 Fribourg became the seat of the Bishop of Lausanne, who, after the Reformation, was forced first into Evian, and then into exile in Burgundy. Today it is the seat of the Diocese of Lausanne, Geneva and Fribourg.

=== 1780–1809 ===
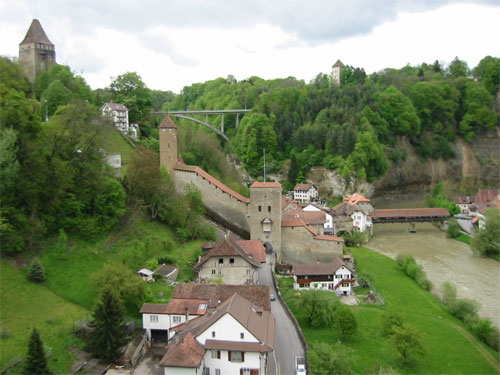
La Sarine in the city

The strong patrician regime, consisting of no more than 60 families, filled all of the influential positions in the city and dominated all political, social, economic and cultural arenas of Fribourg. On several occasions unhappy citizens joined to attempt a revolt, including in 1781 under the leadership of Pierre-Nicolas Chenaux. These revolts were repressed with the help of Bern and Bernese troops. The invasion of Switzerland by French troops in 1798 led to the downfall of this Ancien Régime. Fribourg capitulated to the French on 2 March and relinquished leadership of its lands. This freed the way for the first municipal elections, in which Jean de Montenach was elected the first mayor. With the introduction of the Act of Mediation under Napoleon in 1803, the separation of the city of Fribourg from its Canton was finally carried out. Fribourg was made the capital of its region and Canton, and, between 1803 and 1809, was one of the capitals of Switzerland.

=== Sonderbund ===
The patricians regained control of the city in 1814 during the Restoration period. They ruled until 1830. Its leadership was followed by a new and more liberal constitution. Fribourg was part of the 1845-1847 Sonderbund, a "separate alliance" of Catholic cantons attempting to secede from Switzerland. Fribourg and the Sonderbund capitulated to Federalist forces under General Dufour on 14 November 1847 in what amounted to a brief and nearly bloodless Swiss civil war. Since 1848, the new national constitution and the amendment to the Canton constitution has guaranteed every citizen the right to vote.

=== Modern times ===
The later 19th and the 20th century brought about drastic changes to the city's culture and physical nature. In 1848 the city wall was partially torn down and a new bridge constructed across the Saane/La Sarine. The opening of the midland railway line through the city in 1862 led to the development of a "railway station quarter" of the city. The improved transportation enabled Fribourg to undergo industrialisation. The city centre shifted from the Old City to the new Train Station quarter. Extensive areas in Pérolles, Beauregard and Vignettaz were developed with industry or houses around 1900. The inauguration of the university in 1889 was an important event in Fribourg. Another economic boon to the city was the opening of the nearby A12 highway.

== Geography ==
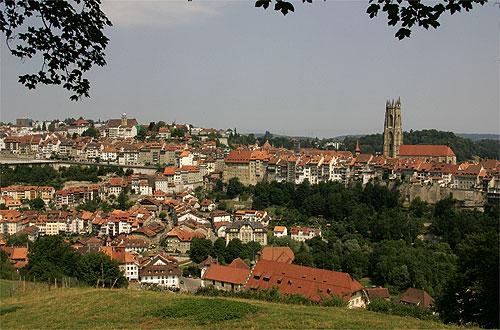
View of Fribourg

Aerial view (1949)

=== Topography ===
Fribourg has an elevation of 581 metres (1,906 ft) (in the Old City), and is situated 28 kilometres (17 mi) southwest of Bern. It is located on the Swiss plateau, and extends on both sides of the Sarine, which, in the vicinity of Fribourg, has cut deeply into the molasse. The Old City is located on a hill, only about 100 metres (330 ft) wide, which rises about 40 metres (130 ft) above the valley floor. Most quarters of the city are located on the High Plateau and the surrounding hills, which have an average elevation of 620 metres (2,030 ft). The valley floor is only settled in the area immediately around the Old City.

Fribourg has an area, as of 2009, of 9.3 square kilometers (3.6 mi^{2}). Of this area, 1.25 km^{2} (0.48 mi^{2}) or 13.4% is used for agricultural purposes, while 1.58 km^{2} (0.61 mi^{2}) or 17.0% is forested. Of the rest of the land, 5.89 km^{2} (2.27 mi^{2}) or 63.3% is settled (buildings or roads), 0.53 km^{2} (0.20 mi^{2}) or 5.7% is either rivers or lakes and 0.07 km^{2} (17 acres) or 0.8% is unproductive land.

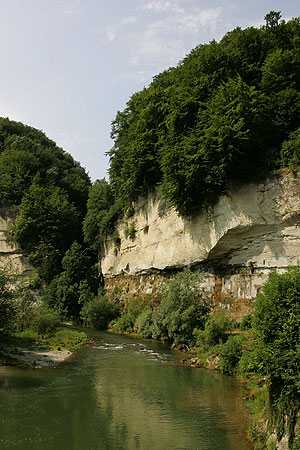
Valley of the Sarine in Fribourg

Of the built up area, industrial buildings made up 4.5% of the total area while housing and buildings made up 34.5% and transportation infrastructure made up 15.2%. Power and water infrastructure as well as other special developed areas made up 1.6% of the area while parks, green belts and sports fields made up 7.5%. Out of the forested land, 14.4% of the total land area is heavily forested and 2.6% is covered with orchards or small clusters of trees. Of the agricultural land, 6.9% is used for growing crops and 6.0% is pastures. Of the water in the municipality, 1.7% is in lakes and 4.0% is in rivers and streams.

The area of the municipality, which is relatively small for a city, covers an area of Molasse in the central part of Canton of Fribourg. The area is cut through from south to north by the tightly wound Saane/La Sarine, which has eroded a valley, in some places, to a depth of 100 metres (330 ft) below the surrounding Plateau. In general, the valley floor is between 200 and 500 metres (660 and 1,640 ft) wide. Le Lac de Pérolles, formed as a reservoir by Maigrauge Dam, the first Gravity Dam in Europe, in 1872, is located south of the city. The head of the Schiffenensee is located just 1 kilometre (0.62 mi) north of the city. At both of these artificial lakes, La Sarine covers nearly the entire valley floor.

The hills flanked on both sides by steep, largely wooded, slopes. To the east, the municipality reaches up the slopes of Mount Schönberg, which, with an elevation of 702 metres (2,303 ft), is the highest point in Fribourg. The river Galtera, also deeply cut into the plateau, flows between the mountain and the river, emptying into the Saane/La Sarine near the Old City.

The former village of Bourguillon lies within the municipality. Fribourg borders on Düdingen and Tafers to the east, Pierrafortscha to the southeast, Marly to the south, Villars-sur-Glâne and Givisiez to the west, and Granges-Paccot to the north.

=== Climate ===
Climate data for Fribourg / Posieux, elevation 651 m (2,136 ft), (1991–2020 normals, extremes 2012–present)
| Month | Jan | Feb | Mar | Apr | May | Jun | Jul | Aug | Sep | Oct | Nov | Dec | Year |
|---|---|---|---|---|---|---|---|---|---|---|---|---|---|
| Record high °C (°F) | 16.0 (60.8) | 17.7 (63.9) | 21.0 (69.8) | 25.8 (78.4) | 28.9 (84.0) | 33.7 (92.7) | 36.6 (97.9) | 36.5 (97.7) | 28.6 (83.5) | 25.0 (77.0) | 20.3 (68.5) | 15.0 (59.0) | 36.6 (97.9) |
| Mean daily maximum °C (°F) | 3.5 (38.3) | 5.2 (41.4) | 9.8 (49.6) | 13.7 (56.7) | 18.0 (64.4) | 21.7 (71.1) | 24.0 (75.2) | 23.6 (74.5) | 18.9 (66.0) | 13.7 (56.7) | 7.6 (45.7) | 4.0 (39.2) | 13.6 (56.5) |
| Daily mean °C (°F) | 0.4 (32.7) | 1.2 (34.2) | 5.1 (41.2) | 8.6 (47.5) | 12.8 (55.0) | 16.5 (61.7) | 18.5 (65.3) | 18.1 (64.6) | 13.7 (56.7) | 9.4 (48.9) | 4.3 (39.7) | 1.1 (34.0) | 9.1 (48.4) |
| Mean daily minimum °C (°F) | −2.6 (27.3) | −2.5 (27.5) | 0.5 (32.9) | 3.2 (37.8) | 7.5 (45.5) | 11.2 (52.2) | 13.0 (55.4) | 12.7 (54.9) | 9.1 (48.4) | 5.6 (42.1) | 1.3 (34.3) | −1.8 (28.8) | 4.8 (40.6) |
| Record low °C (°F) | −15.0 (5.0) | −18.9 (−2.0) | −8.1 (17.4) | −4.9 (23.2) | −2.5 (27.5) | 0.0 (32.0) | 6.3 (43.3) | 6.4 (43.5) | 2.0 (35.6) | −3.0 (26.6) | −8.8 (16.2) | −13.9 (7.0) | −18.9 (−2.0) |
| Average precipitation mm (inches) | 50.3 (1.98) | 50.1 (1.97) | 59.6 (2.35) | 74.6 (2.94) | 107.7 (4.24) | 101.2 (3.98) | 105.7 (4.16) | 105.9 (4.17) | 82.9 (3.26) | 87.4 (3.44) | 71.7 (2.82) | 65.1 (2.56) | 962.2 (37.88) |
| Average snowfall cm (inches) | 10.8 (4.3) | 12.4 (4.9) | 7.5 (3.0) | 2.3 (0.9) | 0.0 (0.0) | 0.0 (0.0) | 0.0 (0.0) | 0.0 (0.0) | 0.0 (0.0) | 0.3 (0.1) | 4.8 (1.9) | 11.6 (4.6) | 49.7 (19.6) |
| Average precipitation days (≥ 1.0 mm) | 9.2 | 8.4 | 9.6 | 9.7 | 12.4 | 11.4 | 10.3 | 10.6 | 8.7 | 10.0 | 9.9 | 10.3 | 120.5 |
| Average snowy days (≥ 1.0 cm) | 3.3 | 3.0 | 1.7 | 0.7 | 0.0 | 0.0 | 0.0 | 0.0 | 0.0 | 0.1 | 1.1 | 2.7 | 12.6 |
| Average relative humidity (%) | 84 | 79 | 72 | 71 | 73 | 72 | 70 | 72 | 78 | 83 | 85 | 85 | 77 |
| Mean monthly sunshine hours | 72 | 92 | 159.6 | 175.9 | 181.2 | 229.7 | 245.5 | 218.5 | 170.2 | 106.5 | 65.4 | 69.9 | 1,786.5 |
Source 1: NOAA
Source 2: MeteoSwissInfoclimat (extremes)

== Politics ==
=== Coat of arms ===
The blazon of the municipal coat of arms is Azure a Castle embattled and towered on dexter issuant from a Semi Annulet all Argent.

The canton and the capital share the same name but have different coats of arms.

=== Government ===
The Municipal Council (French: Conseil communal de la Ville de Fribourg, German: Gemeinderat) constitutes the executive government of the City of Fribourg and operates as a collegiate authority. It is composed of five councilors (French: Conseiller communal / Conseillère communale, German: Gemeinderat / Gemeinderätin), each presiding over a directorate comprising several departments and the related commissions. The president of the executive department acts as mayor (syndic). In the mandate period 2021–2026 (la législature) the Municipal Council is presided by Monsieur le Syndic Thierry Steiert. Departmental tasks, coordination measures and implementation of laws decreed by the General Council (parliament) are carried by the Municipal Council. The regular election of the Municipal Council by any inhabitant valid to vote is held every five years. Any resident of Fribourg allowed to vote can be elected as a member of the Municipal Council. Due to the constitution by canton of Fribourg not only Swiss citizen have the right to vote and elect and being elected on communal level, but also foreigners with a residence permit of type C and being resident in the canton of Fribourg for at least 5 years. The current mandate period is from 1 June 2021 to 31 May 2026. The delegates are selected by means of a system of Proporz. The mayor is elected as such by a public election while the heads of the other directorates are assigned by the collegiate. The executive body holds its meetings in the Town Hall (L'Hôtel de Ville), in the old city on Place de l'Hôtel-de-Ville.

As of 2021, Fribourg's Municipal Council is made up of two representatives of the PS/SP (Social Democratic Party, of whom one is also the mayor), and one each of PDC/CVP (Christian Democratic Party), PCS/CSP (Christian Social Party), and PES/GPS (Green Party), giving the left parties a majority of four out of five seats. The last regular election was held on 7 March 2021. All previous members have been re-elected.

Le Conseil communal / Gemeinderat of Fribourg
| Municipal Councillor (Conseiller communal / Conseillère communale, Gemeinderat/-rätin) | Party | Head of Directorate (Direction / Direktion, since) of | in office since |
|---|---|---|---|
| Thierry Steiert (Note: Mayor (French: Syndic, German: Ammann)) | PS | General Administration, Human Resources, Legal Affairs, and Civic Community Affairs (de l'administration générale, des ressources humaines, du service juridique et des affaires bourgeoisiales / der Zentralverwaltung, des Personalwesens, des Rechtsdienst und der Burgergemeinde, 2021) | 2011 |
| Laurent Dietrich (Note: Vice-Mayor (French: Vice-Syndic, German: Vizeammann)) | PDC | Finance, Culture, and Information Technology (des finances, de la culture et de l'informatique / der Finanzen, der Kultur und der Informatik, 2021) | 2016 |
| Miirjam Ballmer | PES | Youth Services, Schools and Social Cohesion, Social Services, and Adult Guardianship (de l'enfance, des écoles et de la cohésion sociale, des affaires sociales et des curatelles d'adultes / der Schule, Kinder und gesellschatflichen Zusammenhalt, der Sozialhilfe und der Beistandschaft für Erwachsene, 2021) | 2021 |
| Andrea Burgener Woeffray | PS | Construction and Services Urban Planning and Architecture and Civil Engineering, Environment and Energy (de l'édilité, des services d'urbanisme et architecture et du génie civil, environnement et énergie / des Bauwesens und der Dienste Stadtplanung und Architektur und Tiefbau, Umwelt und Energie, 2021) | 2016 |
| Pierre-Olivier Nobs | PCS | Local Police and Mobility and Sports (de la police locale et mobilité et des Sports / der Ortspolizei und Mobilität und des Sports, 2021) | 2016 |

=== Parliament ===
The Conseil général / Generalrat of Fribourg for the mandate period of 2021–2026
1. PS/SP (28.8%)
2. Les Verts/Grüne (PES/GPS) (26.3%)
3. Centre gauche – PCS/CSP (8.80%)
4. PA/KP (1.30%)
5. PDC/CVP – Centre (17.5%)
6. PLR/FDP (10.0%)
7. UDC/SVP (7.50%)

The General Council (French: Conseil général, German: Generalrat), the city parliament, holds legislative power. It is made up of 80 members, with elections held every five years. The General Council decrees regulations and by-laws that are executed by the Municipal Council and the administration. The delegates are selected by means of a system of proportional representation.

The sessions of the General Council are public. Unlike members of the Municipal Council, members of the General Council are not politicians by profession, and they are paid a fee based on their attendance. Any resident of Fribourg allowed to vote can be elected as a member of the General Council. Due to the constitution by canton of Fribourg not only Swiss citizen have the right to vote and elect and being elected on communal level, but also foreigners with a residence permit of type C and being resident in the canton of Fribourg for at least 5 years. The Parliament holds its meetings in the Grande salle de la Maison de Justice, in the old city on rue des Chanoines 1.

The last regular election of the General Council was held on 7 March 2021 for the mandate period (la législature) from 1 June 2021 to 31 May 2026. Currently the General Council consist of 23 (-7) members of the Social Democratic Party (PS/SP), 21 (+13) Green Party (PES/GPS), 1 (-1) Christian Democratic People's Party (PDC/CVP), 8 (-2) The Liberals (PLR/FDP), 7 (+2) Centre Gauche (PCS/CSP), 6 (-2) Swiss People's Party (UDC/SVP), and one (-) for parti des artistes (PA/KP), giving the left parties a very strong absolute majority.

=== Elections ===
==== National Council ====
In the 2019 federal election for the Swiss National Council the most popular party was the PS/SP which received 29.4% (-6.8) of the vote. The next four most popular parties were the Green Party 20.9% (+11.0), the PDC/CVP 15.5% (-7.0), the UDC/SVP 9.7% (-4.1), and the FDP/PLR 9.1% (+0.4). In the federal election, a total of 9,426 voters were cast, and the voter turnout was 46.6%.

In the 2015 federal election for the Swiss National Council the most popular party was the PS/SP which received 36.3% of the vote. The next four most popular parties were the PDC/CVP (22.5%), the UDC/SVP (13.8%), the Green Party (9.8%), and the FDP/PLR (8.7%). In the federal election, a total of 9,795 voters were cast, and the voter turnout was 48.4%.

== Demographics ==
=== Population ===
Fribourg has a population (as of December 2020) of 38,039. In 2008, 31.9% of the population were resident foreign nationals. Between 2000 and 2010, the population increased by 8.3%. Migration accounted for 8.1%, while births and deaths accounted for 0.9%.

Fribourg is the largest city in the Canton of Fribourg. The population of Fribourg grew markedly at the beginning of the 20th century, as well as from 1930 to 1970. The maximum population of 42,000 was reached in 1974. Since then, there had been a population loss of approximately 14%.

The population of the agglomeration around Fribourg is 110,000, or, counting only the most nearby suburbs, 75,000 (2015). This includes the municipalities of Avry, Belfaux, Corminboeuf, Givisiez, Granges-Paccot, Marly, Matran and Villars-sur-Glâne. Surrounding municipalities include Givisiez, Granges-Paccot, Villars-sur-Glâne, Marly, as well as Corminboeuf, Belfaux, Grolley, and stretches as far as Düdingen (French Guin) and Tafers (French Tavel) on the right bank of the Sarine.

The growth of the agglomeration around Fribourg has fused the city proper with the neighboring towns of Villars-sur-Glâne, Givisiez, and Granges-Paccot. The town of Klein-Schönberg, which belongs to Tafers, and the village of Uebewil, which belongs to Düdingen, are located right on the eastern edge of town. This settlement area itself has a population of 60,000 (2015).

In 2008, the population was 48.8% male and 51.2% female. The population was made up of 12,080 Swiss men (31.8% of the population) and 6,475 (17.0%) non-Swiss men. There were 13,855 Swiss women (36.4%) and 5,636 (14.8%) non-Swiss women. Of the population in the municipality, 10,756 or about 30.3% were born in Fribourg and lived there in 2000. There were 6,394 or 18.0% who were born in the same canton, while 7,164 or 20.2% were born somewhere else in Switzerland, and 8,981 or 25.3% were born outside of Switzerland.

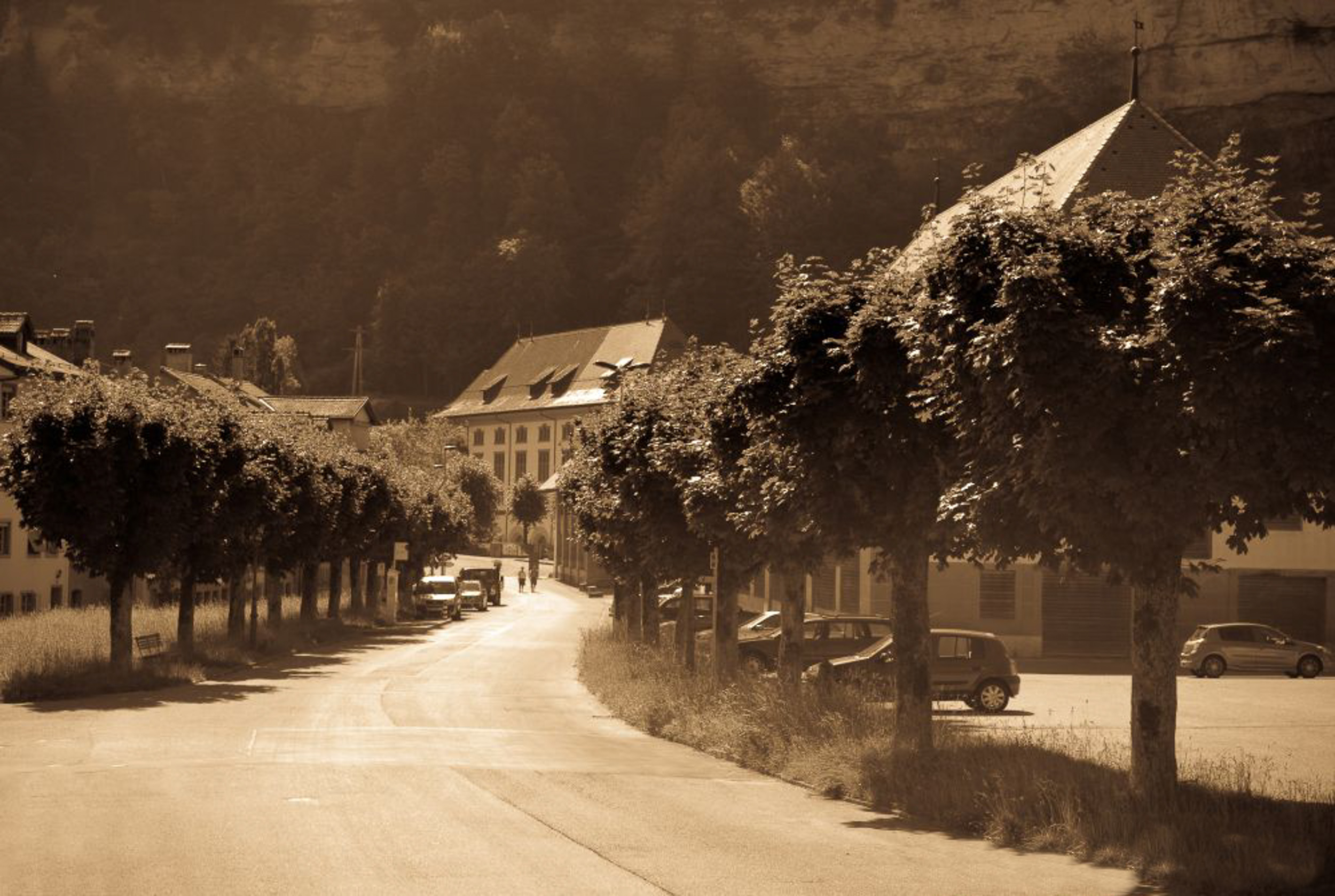
View looking southeast along the Planche-Inférieure

In 2000, children and teenagers (0–19 years old) made up 19.3% of the population, while adults 20 to 64 years old comprised 65.8% and seniors (65 and older) were 14.9%.

In 2000, there were 17,825 people who were single and never married in the municipality. There were 13,581 married individuals, 2,146 widows or widowers and 1,995 individuals who are divorced.

There were 15,839 private households in the municipality in 2000, and an average of two people per household. There were 7,342 households that consisted of only one person and 687 households with five or more residents. In 2000, a total of 15,409 apartments (87.0% of the total) were permanently occupied, while 1,757 apartments (9.9%) were seasonally occupied and 549 apartments (3.1%) were empty. In 2009, the construction rate of new housing units was 5.5 new units per 1000 residents.

In 2003 the average price to rent an average apartment in Fribourg was 1062.05 Swiss francs (CHF) per month (US$850, £480, €680 approx. exchange rate from 2003). The average rate for a one-room apartment was 623.40 CHF (US$500, £280, €400), a two-room apartment was about 792.47 CHF (US$630, £360, €510), a three-room apartment was about 993.14 CHF (US$790, £450, €640) and a six or more room apartment cost an average of 1870.76 CHF (US$1500, £840, €1200). The average apartment price in Fribourg was 95.2% of the national average of 1116 CHF. The vacancy rate for the municipality, in 2010, was 1.45%.

=== Historic population ===
The historical population is given in the following chart:

Historic Population Data
| Year | Total Population | French Speaking | German Speaking | Protestant | Catholic | Other | Jewish | Islamic | No religion given | Swiss | Non-Swiss |
|---|---|---|---|---|---|---|---|---|---|---|---|
| 13th century | 2,000–3,000 | | | | | | | | | | |
| 1450 | 6,000 | | | | | | | | | | |
| 1798 | 5,117 | | | | | | | | | | |
| 1811 | 6,200 | | | | | | | | | | |
| 1850 | 9,065 | | | 511 | 8,554 | | | | | 8,574 | 491 |
| 1870 | 10,581 | | | 1,136 | 9,731 | | | | | 9,794 | 1,110 |
| 1888 | 12,195 | 7,556 | 4,523 | 1,607 | 10,512 | 22 | 74 | | | 11,321 | 874 |
| 1900 | 15,794 | 9,701 | 5,595 | 2,395 | 13,270 | 140 | 109 | | | 14,208 | 1,586 |
| 1910 | 20,293 | 12,358 | 6,688 | 2,372 | 17,746 | 483 | 121 | | | 16,798 | 3,495 |
| 1930 | 21,557 | 13,524 | 7,176 | 2,287 | 19,100 | 393 | 77 | | | 19,588 | 1,969 |
| 1950 | 29,005 | 18,286 | 9,630 | 2,834 | 25,826 | 466 | 137 | | | 27,069 | 1,936 |
| 1970 | 39,695 | 22,437 | 11,114 | 3,256 | 35,863 | 2,737 | 115 | 101 | 179 | 32,208 | 7,487 |
| 1990 | 36,355 | 21,240 | 8,288 | 3,148 | 29,750 | 5,028 | 63 | 1,132 | 1,641 | 27,632 | 8,723 |
| 2000 | 35,547 | 22,603 | 7,520 | 3,082 | 24,614 | 4,065 | 62 | 1,676 | 2,843 | 25,834 | 9,713 |

=== Languages ===
Most of the population (as of 2000) speaks French (22,603 or 63.6%) as their first language, German is the second most common (7,520 or 21.2%) and Italian is the third (1,359 or 3.8%). There are 55 people who speak Romansh. Few inhabitants in village of Basse-Ville speak Bolze, a mixed language created from the blend of French and Swiss German. Fribourg, the city and the canton, has two official languages, and French outweighs German as both the language of the local government and the most commonly spoken language in public discourse and business in the canton.

Fribourg has always been located on the Swiss language border, but at the time of the city's founding in the 12th century, German was the prevailing language. Although German was the official language of the city until 1800, French gradually became more influential. This was aided by industrialization, which led to an influx of French-speaking immigrants. Since the political changes of the late 18th century and early 19th century, the German-speaking population has been a minority. Even in German, the town is often called "Fribourg" instead of the Standard German "Freiburg", which helps distinguish it from Freiburg im Breisgau on the edge of the Black Forest, Germany. Another explanation is that in the local Alemannic German dialect, the city is called Frybùrg or Friburg (pronounced: [ˈfrib̥ʊrɡ]), from which the French name "Fribourg" was probably derived.

=== Religion ===
From the 2000 census, 24,614 or 69.2% were Roman Catholic, while 2,763 or 7.8% belonged to the Swiss Reformed Church. Of the rest of the population, there were 443 members of an Orthodox church (or about 1.25% of the population), there were 13 individuals (or about 0.04% of the population) who belonged to the Christian Catholic Church, and there were 668 individuals (or about 1.88% of the population) who belonged to another Christian church. There were 62 individuals (or about 0.17% of the population) who were Jewish, and 1,676 (or about 4.71% of the population) who were Muslim. There were 161 individuals who were Buddhist, 71 individuals who were Hindu and 43 individuals who belonged to another church. 2,843 (or about 8.00% of the population) belonged to no church, are agnostic or atheist, and 2,509 individuals (or about 7.06% of the population) did not answer the question.

The city remained Catholic during the Reformation, and has since become a centre of Catholicism. It has a greater than average number of churches and monasteries. Fribourg has been the seat of the Diocese of Lausanne, Geneva and Fribourg since 1613. (See Sonderbund)

== Economy ==
=== Development of trade and economy ===
Several types of industry developed in Fribourg as early as the 13th and 14th centuries. The extension of the city along the east bank of the Saane/La Sarine made about this time was indicative of a strong economic upturn. In Galterntal, water power was used for various mills. Along the Saane new trade districts developed with the towns of Au, Neustadt and Matten.

The tanneries and cloth manufacturers, strengthened by widespread sheep raising, led to an economic boom in the 14th and 15th centuries. This helped Fribourg by making its trades well known throughout central Europe. A gradual decline in cloth making in the second half of the 15th century occurred as local farmers replaced their sheep with cattle. Other reasons for the collapse of the cloth industry in the 16th century include the fact that the guild refused to use new materials or modern styles, and that the social structure of the city changed with the rise of the patrician class.

After this time, Fribourg was shaped by low-level trade, and was not industrialized until it was connected to the Swiss Railroad, beginning in the 1870s. After Lake Pérolles was built in 1872, energy was able to be supplied to the plateau south and west of the city. Thus, an industrial area developed there, dominated in its early years by a wagon factory and a lumber mill. Later, two breweries were established in this area. A chocolate factory was established in Villârs-sur-Glâne in 1901, but it came under Fribourg's jurisdiction in 1906 after a change of borders.

In the course of the 20th century, the plateau became the industrial section of the city. The development of new industrial areas in neighbouring municipalities, beginning in the 1970s, has permitted continued economic growth.

=== Economic situation today ===
As of 2010, Fribourg had an unemployment rate of 4.9%. As of 2008, there were 18 people employed in the primary economic sector and about 5 businesses involved in this sector. 3,821 people were employed in the secondary sector and there were 232 businesses in this sector. 21,614 people were employed in the tertiary sector, with 2,004 businesses in this sector. There were 17,207 residents of the municipality who were employed in some capacity, of which women made up 47.1% of the workforce.

In 2008 the total number of full-time equivalent jobs was 20,099. The number of jobs in the primary sector was 14, of which 4 were in agriculture, 8 were in forestry or lumber production and 1 was in fishing or fisheries. The number of jobs in the secondary sector was 3,530 of which 1,744 or (49.4%) were in manufacturing, 9 or (0.3%) were in mining and 1,455 (41.2%) were in construction. The number of jobs in the tertiary sector was 16,555. In the tertiary sector; 2,633 or 15.9% were in wholesale or retail sales or the repair of motor vehicles, 993 or 6.0% were in the movement and storage of goods, 1,003 or 6.1% were in a hotel or restaurant, 568 or 3.4% were in the information industry, 957 or 5.8% were the insurance or financial industry, 1,535 or 9.3% were technical professionals or scientists, 3,273 or 19.8% were in education and 1,970 or 11.9% were in health care.

Fribourg has more jobs than laborers, and is therefore a large commuter destination for the largely agricultural surrounding area. Local industry includes food and luxury products, drinks (the breweries are owned by the Danish firm Carlsberg), metal and machine construction, electronics, and computer technology.

The largest number of workers are active in the service industries. Many of these work in government administrative positions. Other important sectors are education (at the university), banks and insurance companies, tourism and restaurants, as well as health services. Fribourg is home to the administrative offices of several international companies. The Cantonal hospital is on the border with Villars-sur-Glâne.

In 2000, there were 16,572 workers who commuted into the municipality and 6,505 workers who commuted away. The municipality is a net importer of workers, with about 2.5 workers entering the municipality for every one leaving. Of the working population, 35% used public transportation to get to work, and 37.8% used a private car.

== Education ==
Schools at the compulsory and pre-university level are available in both French and German. The university is officially bilingual, meaning students are expected to have a passive knowledge of both languages, even though it is possible to graduate with a degree exclusively in either language, or both. It is also reputed abroad for its legal and theological studies.

The Villa St. Jean International School was also located in Fribourg.

- University of Fribourg
- University of Applied Science Fribourg: offers applied tertiary education in technical and management disciplines. Part of UAS Western Switzerland/HES-SO.
- École de multimédia et d'art de Fribourg: multimedia and art school, Fribourg, is a professional school on new media communication, image and technics.

Fribourg is home to 5 libraries. These libraries include; the BCU Fribourg, the Deutsche Bibliothek Fribourg, the Bibliothèque de la Ville, the Haute école de santé Fribourg and the École d'ingénieurs et d'architectes (EIA-FR). There was a combined total (as of 2008) of 3,531,605 books or other media in the libraries, and in the same year a total of 611,405 items were loaned out.

In Fribourg about 11,649 or (32.8%) of the population have completed non-mandatory upper secondary education, and 5,671 or (16.0%) have completed additional higher education (either university or a Fachhochschule). Of the 5,671 who completed tertiary schooling, 47.7% were Swiss men, 31.2% were Swiss women, 12.4% were non-Swiss men and 8.7% were non-Swiss women.

The Canton of Fribourg school system provides one year of non-obligatory Kindergarten, followed by six years of Primary school. This is followed by three years of obligatory lower Secondary school where the students are separated according to ability and aptitude. Following the lower Secondary students may attend a three or four-year optional upper Secondary school. The upper Secondary school is divided into gymnasium (university preparatory) and vocational programs. After they finish the upper Secondary program, students may choose to attend a Tertiary school or continue their apprenticeship.

During the 2010–11 school year, there were a total of 14,170 students attending 974 classes in Fribourg. A total of 4,966 students from the municipality attended any school, either in the municipality or outside of it. There were 25 kindergarten classes with a total of 385 students in the municipality. The municipality had 117 primary classes and 2,037 students. During the same year, there were 117 lower secondary classes with a total of 2,313 students. There were 470 vocational upper Secondary classes and were 186 upper Secondary classes, with 4,012 upper Secondary students and 4,840 vocational upper Secondary students The municipality had 46 specialized Tertiary classes and were 13 non-university Tertiary classes, with 273 non-university Tertiary students and 310 specialized Tertiary students. With its vast diversity of languages and course offerings, University of Fribourg is a popular destination for students on their Erasmus Programme.

As of 2000, there were 8,234 students in Fribourg who came from another municipality, while 305 residents attended schools outside the municipality.

== Transport ==
Fribourg is the most important transport hub of the canton of Fribourg.

=== Roads ===
The town lies on the old main road from Bern to Vevey, and acts as an access point to Payerne, Morat and Thun. The connection to the Swiss motorway network was established in 1971 with the opening of the A12 motorway from Bern to Matran, which was extended in 1981 to Vevey. The Swiss east-west A1 from the West Bern bypasses the town to the north and west, only affecting the communities of Tälchen and Chamblioux. The access points of Fribourg-Sud and Fribourg-North are each about 3 km from the city centre.

=== Railway ===
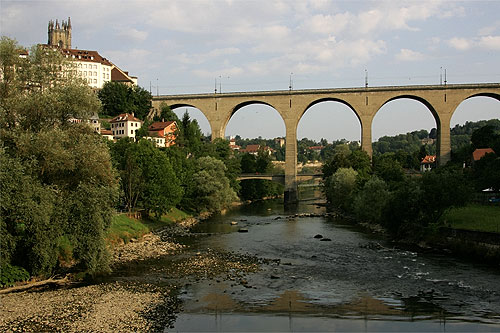
Zaehringen bridge crossing the Sarine

The connection to the railway network was accomplished in several stages from 1860. Initially, the railway line from Bern to Fribourg opened on 2 July 1860 with a temporary terminal at Balliswil about 4 km north of the city, as the Grandfey Viaduct over the Sarine valley was not yet finished. On 4 September 1862, the whole of the line from Balliswil to Lausanne via Fribourg opened, with a temporary station building at Fribourg/Freiburg railway station, until the permanent building opened in 1873. A line to Payerne opened on 25 August 1876 and to Morat on 23 August 1898.

=== Public transport ===
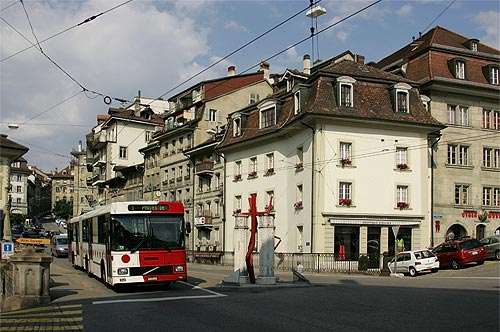
TPF trolley bus in Fribourg

A funicular railway has been operated from the Neuveville district to the upper city since 1899 by the sewage works. The Fribourg funicular is one of the world's few remaining water-powered funiculars, and the only one powered by sewage water. The upper station is located at the sewage plant which pumps sewage water into the descending car, which makes it heavier than the ascending car. The sewage is released at the bottom.

From 1897 to 1965 in Fribourg there was a 6-kilometre (3.7 mi) long tram network in operation, with the trams replaced from 1949 with the Fribourg trolleybus system. The current bus network is now operated by the Transports publics fribourgeois, with connections to Bulle, Avenches, Schmitten, Schwarzenburg and in the tourist region Schwarzsee.

=== Airport ===
The regional Bern-Belp Airport is an hour away from the area. However, the airport only provides flights to limited European destinations. The nearest international airports are Geneva Airport, located 119 km (74 mi) south west, EuroAirport Basel Mulhouse Freiburg, located 166 km (103 mi) north, and Zurich Airport, located 182 km (113 mi) north east of Fribourg.

== Culture and tourism ==
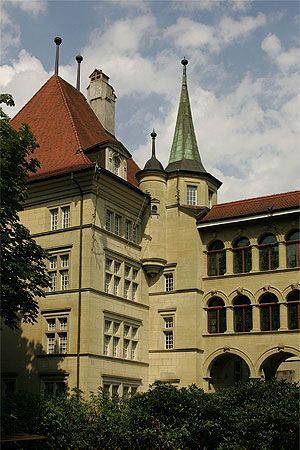
Fribourg Hôtel Ratzé

Fribourg is a day trip destination for tourists who want to visit the sights of the city. These include the historic Old City with its Gothic Cathedral of Saint Nicholas renowned for its stained glass windows designed by Józef Mehoffer, and the museums. The Natural History Museum was founded in 1873, and is now located in the natural sciences building at the university. The Museum of Art and History, located in the Ratzéhof since 1920, has exhibits on ancient and early history, sculpture and paintings, traditional tin figures, arts and crafts, as well as money and graphic collections. In the cathedral, a treasure chamber has been on display since 1992. Other museums include the Swiss Museum of Marionnettes, the Swiss Sewing Machine Museum, the Gutenberg Museum, the Bible and Orient Museum and a beer museum.

Cultural experiences include the festival of religious music, the international folklore convention, the jazz parade, an international film festival and Cinéplus (since 1972).

Like its sister city Bern, Fribourg has preserved its medieval center as a whole that is now one of the largest in Europe. It is located on a spectacular peninsula, surrounded on three sides by the Saane/La Sarine. The architecture of the Old City date primarily from the Gothic period; it was built predominately before the 16th century. Most houses are built of the local molasse stone. Consisting of the neighborhoods Bourg, Auge and Neuveville, its old town is rich in fountains and churches dating from the 12th century until the 17th century. Its cathedral, reaching 76 metres (249 ft) in height, was built between 1283 and 1490. The fortifications of Fribourg form the most important medieval military architecture of Switzerland: 2 kilometres (1.2 mi) of ramparts, 14 towers and one big bulwark. The protections are especially well preserved east and south of the city.

== Heritage sites of national significance ==
Fribourg is home to 67 buildings or sites that are listed as Swiss heritage site of national significance.

- Religious Buildings: Cistercians Maigrauge Abbey with Library, the former Convent of the Augustinians, Former Commandry de Saint-Jean, Notre-Dame de Fribourg Basilica, Saint-Nicolas et Trésor Cathedral, Centre paroissial du Christe-Roi, Chapel de Lorette, Chapel Saint-Barthélemy and Chapel de Pérolles, Convent of the Capucins, Convent of the Cordeliers, Convent of the Ursulines, Church of Saint-Pierre, Monastère de la Visitation and Monastère of the Capucines de Montorge
- Secular Buildings: Former Hôtel des Postes et Télégraphes, Centrale énergétique de la Maigrauge, Cercle de la Grande Société, Chancellerie de l'État, Poya Castle, Cure at Rue de la Lenda 1, Factory Complex of the Chocolats Villars company, Fortifications, Funiculaire Neuveville-Saint-Pierre, Hôpital of the Bourgeois, Hôtel de Ville, Immeuble de rapport Sallin, Les Arcades, Motta Swimming Pool and Vieille Village
- Houses and Private Buildings: Auberge de la Cigogne, House at Rue de la Neuveville 48, House at Rue d'Or 7, House at Rue d'Or 13, House d'Alt at Place de l'Hôtel-de-Ville 1, House de Castella, House de Fégely-d'Estavayer dite Vicarino, House de François-Prosper de Castella, House de Gottrau dite Les Tornalettes, House de Jean-François d'Ammann de Macconens, House de Lanthen-Heid, House de Reyff, House de Reyff de Cugy, House de Techtermann, House de Nicolas Kuenlin, House des tanneurs Reyff, House Fégely (?) dite tannerie Deillon and Villa Mayer
- Schools: Collège Saint-Michel, Université Miséricorde
- Archives, Libraries and Museums: Archives de l'État de Fribourg, Archives de la Ville de Fribourg, Cantonal and University Library, Grenier de Derrière-Notre-Dame et Museum Gutenberg, Musée suisse des arts graphiques, Grenier de la Planche and Hôtel Ratzé et Museum d'art et d'histoire
- Fountains: Fountain de la Fidélité, Fountain de la Force, Fountain de la Samaritaine, Fountain de la Vaillance, Fountain de Sainte-Anne, Fountain de Saint-Georges, Fountain de Saint-Jean, Fountain de Samson and Jo Siffert Fountain
- Bridges: Pont de Berne, Pont de Saint-Jean, Pont du Gottéron and Pont du Milieu

== Sports ==
The most popular sport club in the town is the ice hockey club HC Fribourg-Gottéron, which plays in the National League (NL). Their home arena is the 9,372-seat BCF Arena. Established in 1937, the club has won the Swiss Championship title once (in 2026).

Basketball is played by Fribourg Olympic, which plays its home games at the 3,500-capacity gym of the Holy Cross College. The club has been successful, winning 22 championships (1966, '71, '73, '74, '78, '79, '81, '82, '85, '91, '92, '98, '99, 07', 08', 16', 18', 19', 21', 22', 23', 2024), thirteen Swiss Cups (1967, '76, '78, '97, '98, 07', 16', 18',19', 22', 23', 24' and 2026) and nine League Cup in (2007, 08', 09', 10', 18', 20',22', 24' and 2025).

The football club FC Fribourg plays in the 2. Liga Interregional, the fifth tier of Swiss Football.

Since 1933, on the first Sunday in October, a race from Murten to Fribourg, the "Murtenlauf" (Murten Run), is held to commemorate the Battle of Murten. The 17-mile (27 km) race is one of the most popular fun runs in Switzerland.

== Notable residents ==
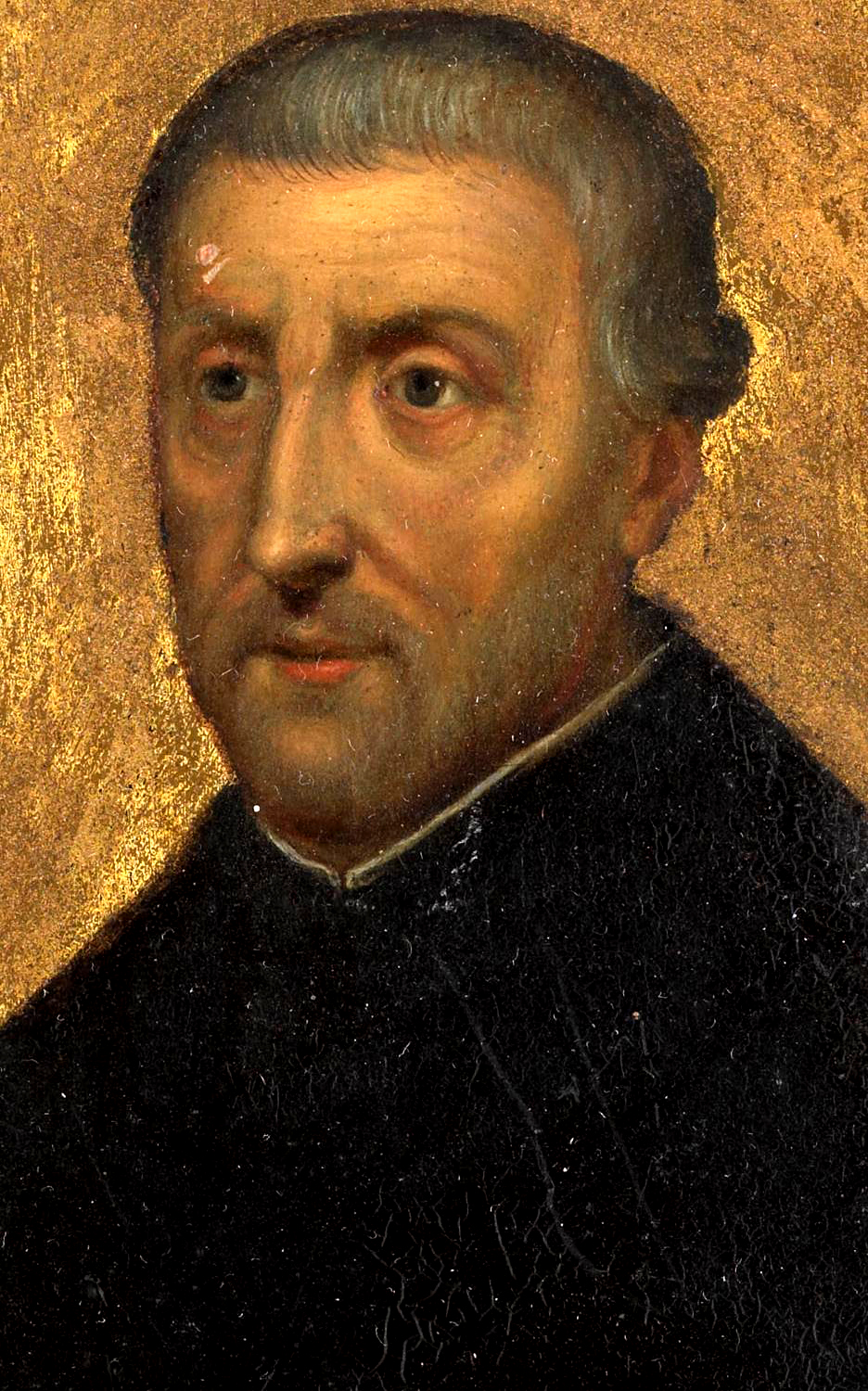
Saint Petrus Canisius, 1699

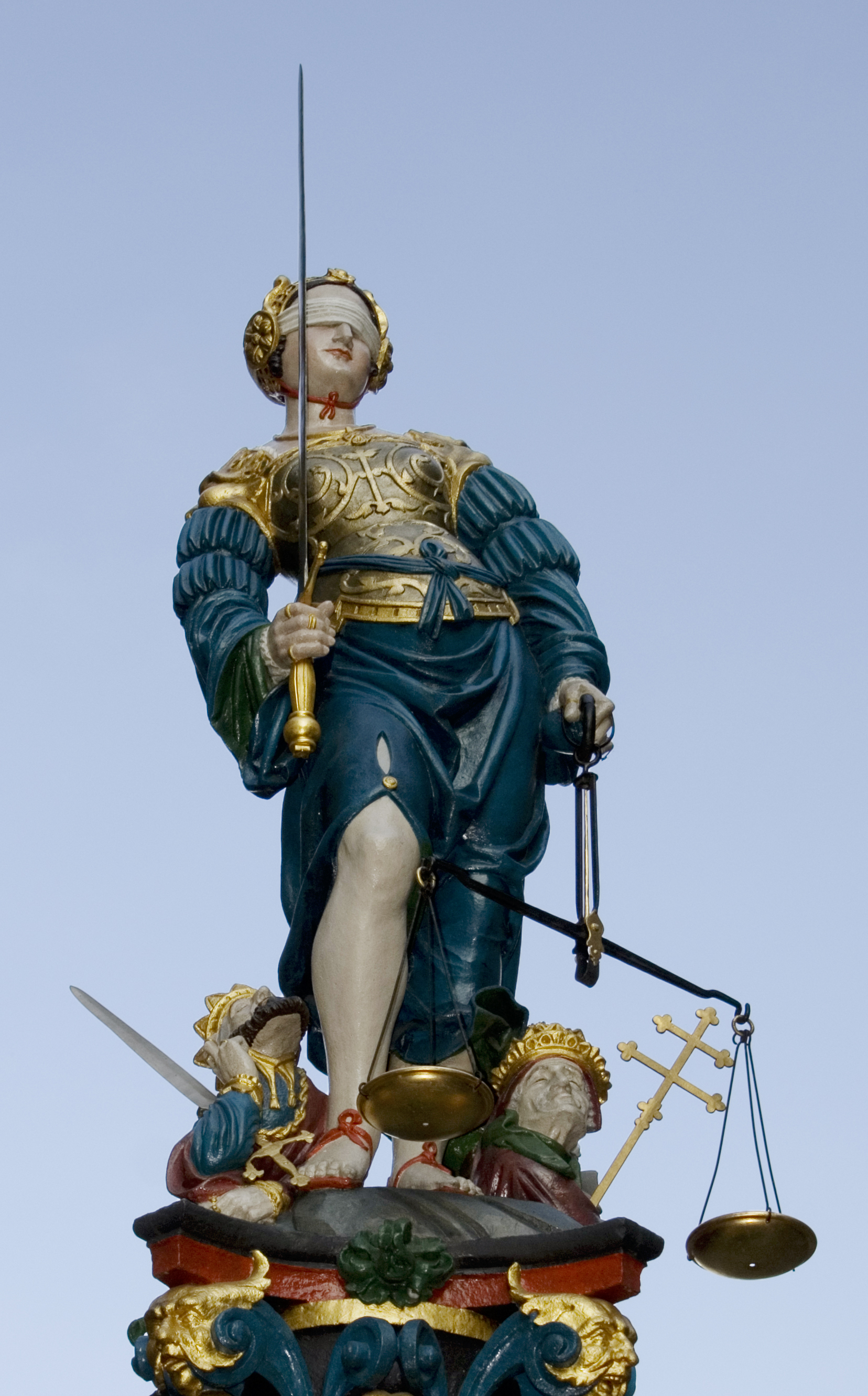
Statue of Lady Justice by Hans Gieng, 1543

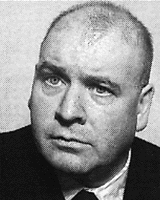
Jean Bourgknecht

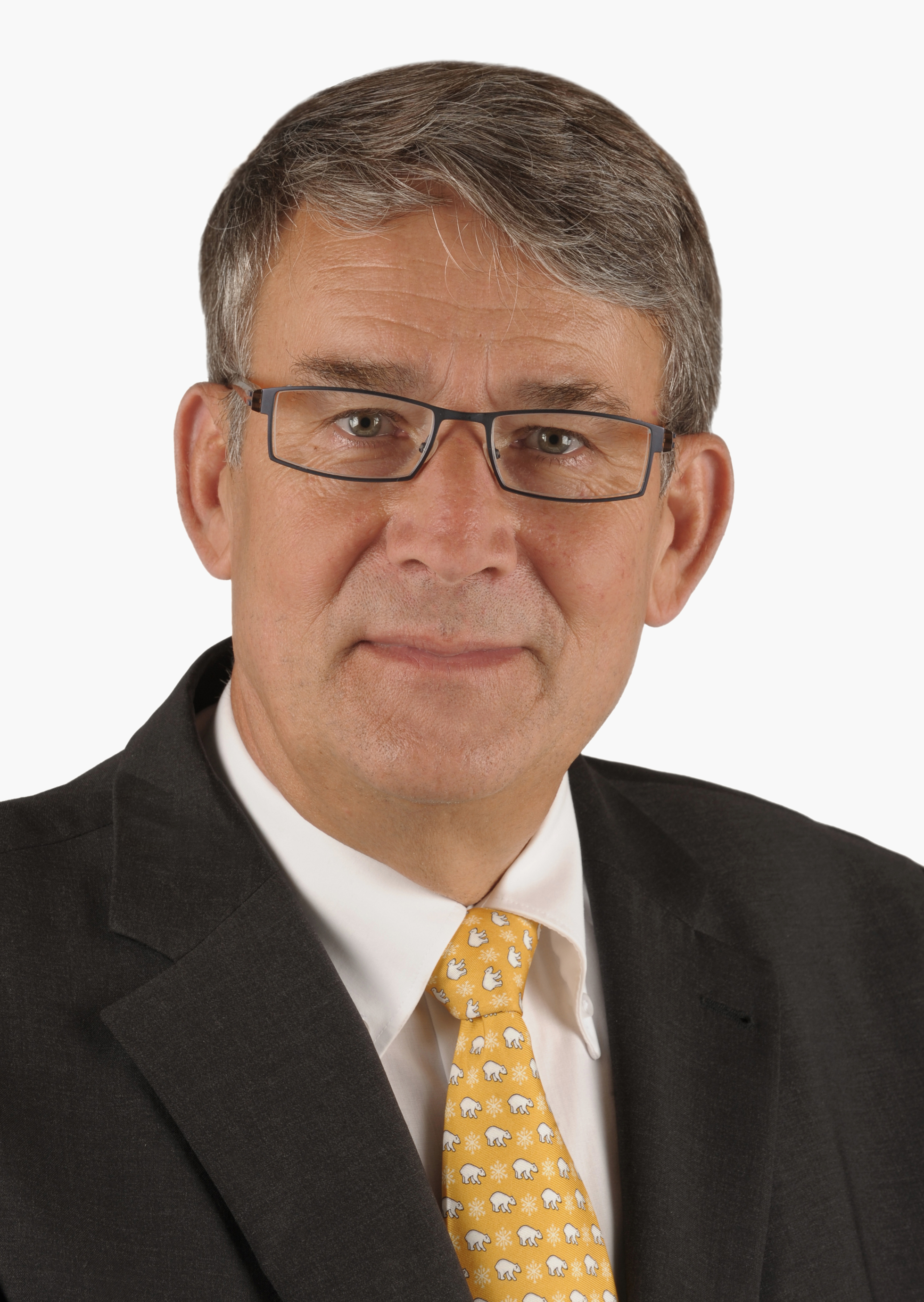
Urs Schwaller, 2007

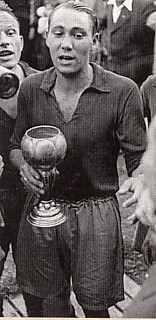
Georges Aeby, 1940

Prior to the 19th century

- The de Weck family, prominent in Fribourg politics beginning in the 15th century
- Hans Fries (c. 1465 – c. 1523), Swiss painter before the Reformation
- Johann Augustanus Faber (c. 1470–1531), Swiss theologian
- Petrus Canisius SJ (1521–1597), Dutch Jesuit Catholic priest, lived in Fribourg 1577–1597 and founded the Jesuit Collège Saint-Michel
- Hans Gieng (first mentioned 1525 – died 1562), Swiss Renaissance sculptor best known for his public fountain figures
- Jean Jacques Joseph d'Alt (1653—1714), Swiss officer and administrator
- Madeleine Eggendorffer (1744–1795), Swiss bookseller, publisher and businesswoman
- Jean-Baptiste Girard (1765–1850), Swiss Franciscan educator

19th century

- Louis Agassiz (1807–1873), Swiss-American biologist and geologist
- Johannes Bapst (1815–1887), Swiss Jesuit missionary, first president of Boston College
- Pierre Rossier (1829–1886), pioneering Swiss photographer, used albumen photographs
- Adèle d'Affry (1836–1879), Swiss artist and sculptor from a noble and military family
- Jules Repond (1853–1933), Swiss lawyer and law professor, writer and journalist, politician, entrepreneur and military officer. Commander of the Pontifical Swiss Guard 1910–1921
- Johann Jakob Hess (1866–1949), Swiss Egyptologist and Assyriologist
- Wilhelm Schmidt SVD (1868–1954 in Fribourg), Austrian linguist, anthropologist and ethnologist
- Oswald Pilloud (1873–1946 in Fribourg), Swiss painter and illustrator
- Jean-Edouard de Castella (1881–1966 in Fribourg), Swiss painter and illustrator
- Oskar Naegeli (1885–1959 in Fribourg), Swiss dermatologist and chess master
- Léon Savary (1895–1968), Swiss writer and journalist, historian of the city of Fribourg

20th century

- Jean Bourgknecht (1902–1964), Swiss politician, mayor of Fribourg 1950–1959 and member of the Swiss Federal Council 1959–1962
- Jean Tinguely (1925–1991), Swiss sculptor of machines or kinetic art, in the Dada tradition
- Anni-Frid Lyngstad (born 1945), singer from Swedish pop group ABBA, lives near Fribourg
- Joseph Deiss (born 1946), economist and Swiss politician; member of the Swiss Federal Council 1999–2006
- Arlette Zola (born 1949), singer for Switzerland in the Eurovision Song Contest 1982.
- Pierre Hemmer (1950–2013), Internet pioneer in Switzerland
- Urs Schwaller (born 1952), Swiss politician, member of the Swiss Council of States for the Canton of Fribourg since 2003
- Daniel Vasella M.D. (born 1953), physician, author and CEO of the Swiss pharmaceutical company Novartis
- Roger de Weck (born 1953), journalist and author
- Juan Carlos I (born 1938), King of Spain from November 1975 until his abdication in 2014.
- Jean-François Mayer (born 1957), religious historian, writer and analyst
- Claude Longchamp (born 1957), Swiss historian, political scientist and analyst for Swiss TV
- Thomas Baumer (born 1960), Swiss economist and expert for intercultural competence and personality assessment
- Caroline Charrière (1960–2018), Swiss composer, conductor, flautist and educator
- Franz Treichler (born 1961), Swiss musician, member of The Young Gods
- Alexander Laszlo (born 1964), polycultural systems scientist, residing in Argentina
- Jean-Claude Bastos de Morais (born 1967), corrupt Swiss-Angolan entrepreneur
- Alain Berset (born 1972), politician and member of the Swiss Federal Council
- René Brülhart (born 1972), Swiss lawyer, president of the board of directors of the Financial Information Authority (AIF) of Vatican City
- Mia Aegerter (born 1976), Swiss musician, model, and stage and film actress
- BARON.E (formed 2019), music duo formed by Faustine Pochon and Arnaud Rolle

Sport

- Paul Aeby (1910–??), Swiss footballer, played for Switzerland in the 1938 FIFA World Cup
- Georges Aeby (1913–1999), footballer, played for Switzerland in the 1938 FIFA World Cup
- Jo Siffert (1936–1971), Swiss F1 racing driver
- René Fasel (born 1950), president of the International Ice Hockey Federation; also a dentist
- Sandra Kolly (born 1974), Swiss sport shooter, competed in the 2008 Summer Olympics
- David Aebischer (born 1978), National Hockey League goaltender
- Yves Miéville (born 1983), Swiss football player, over 250 team games
- Pascal Mancini (born 1989), Swiss 100 metres sprinter, nandrolone user and racist
- Volkan Oezdemir (born 1989), mixed martial artist
- Karen Gaillard (born 2001), racing driver

== Twin towns – sister cities ==
Fribourg is twinned with:

- Rueil-Malmaison, France

== See also ==
- List of mayors of Fribourg
- Franco-Provençal language
- Villa St. Jean International School
- Nova Friburgo, Brazil
- Sonderbund
- Treaty of Fribourg (1516)
