= Claude Longchamp =

Swiss historian and political scientist

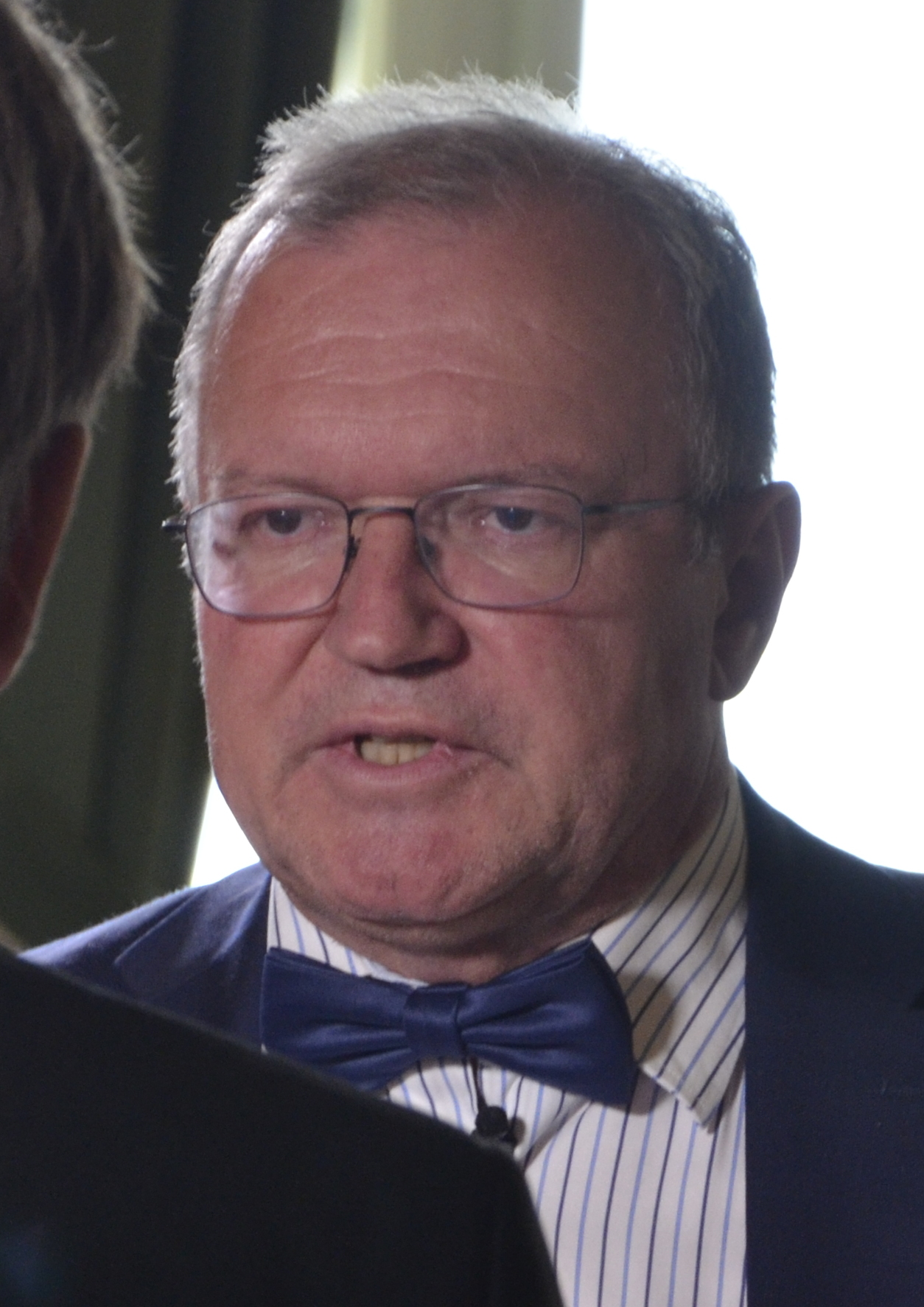
Claude Longchamp in 2019

Claude Longchamp (born 14 March 1957) is a Swiss historian and political scientist (with no university degree). He is a prominent political analyst for Swiss national television and radio, and he is the main figure behind the research institute gfs.bern, which conducts both the main pre- and post-vote polls and projections of national votes in Switzerland.

== Life ==
Longchamp was born on 14 March 1957 in Fribourg, Switzerland.

== Career ==
Longchamp's main research interest lies in the analysis of direct democracy, in particular voting behaviour of citizens in a direct democratic setting, social and political determinants of opinion formation, as well as political communication and the mass media. One of his main contributions to the analysis of direct democratic decisions is the “Disposition Approach”, a framework combining the predispositions citizen hold and the information available to them to explain voting behavior.

Longchamp's research also covers Swiss politics, European politics, health policy, economic and financial policy, environmental and technology policy, political culture, anti-Semitism, public opinion, political communication, polling, and lobbying.

Since 1987, Longchamp has been the main analyst of voting behavior for Swiss national television and radio (SRG SSR idée Suisse). He and his team at gfs.bern have been responsible for vote projections on behalf of Swiss television since 1992 and the national polls on elections, referendums and initiatives since 1998. In addition, since 1992 he has been editor of the government-funded post-vote Vox-Analyses of national referendums and initiatives. Longchamp is also responsible for the annual Swiss Worry Barometer, the Swiss Health Monitor, the Swiss Financial Monitor, and is currently preparing the Swiss Racism Monitor.

Until 1992, Longchamp lectured on political science at the University of Bern. Thereafter, he taught at the Universities of Freiburg, Zürich, St. Gallen, as well as the Polytechnics in Winterthur, Zürich, and Lausanne. Since 2008, he has been teaching the course "Applied Political Research" at the University of St. Gallen in the context of the International Affairs Program.

From 1993 until 2003, Longchamp was CEO and member of the board of directors of the GfS-Research Institute, Politics and State Division. Since 2004, he has been CEO and since 2009 also chairman of the board of directors of the research institute gfs.bern, the successor organization of the GfS-institute. As a reaction to criticism directed at the research institute gfs.bern and its managing director, the Independent Complaints Authority for Swiss Radio and Television affirmed in 2008 that gfs.bern was one of the most highly recognized institutions in applied political research in Switzerland.

In addition to his work in applied political science, Claude Longchamp also works as an applied historian, conducting historico-politico-cultural guided city tours for international delegations, politicians, government employees, and journalists.

Longchamp is a member of the Social Democratic Party of Switzerland, however, since 1993 he has been a passive member only. He is also involved in the society "Bern neu gründen" ("Re-Founding Bern"), which has the aim of re-forging Bern as the leading political centre in Switzerland.
