= Notre-Dame de Fribourg Basilica =

Catholic basilica in Fribourg, Switzerland, dedicated to Notre-Dame

Basilica of Notre-Dame, Fribourg
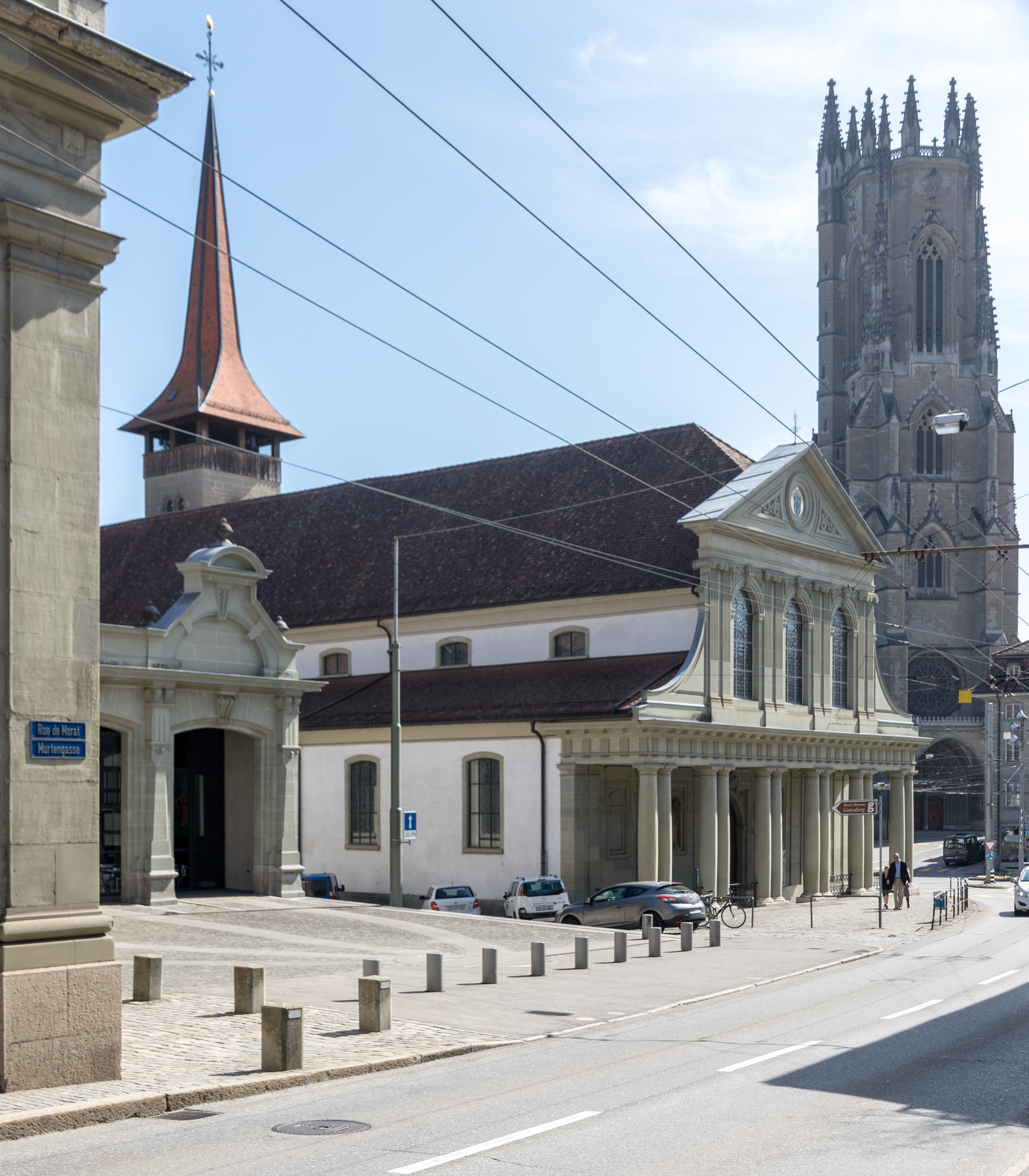
- Basilica of Notre-Dame (and the Cathedrals tower)

Religion
- Affiliation: Catholicism
- Deity: Virgin Mary

Location
- Country: Switzerland
- Interactive map of Basilica of Notre-Dame, Fribourg
- Administration: Diocese of Lausanne, Geneva and Fribourg
- Coordinates: 46.8069°N 7.1617°E

Website
- http://www.basilique-fribourg.ch

The Basilica of Notre-Dame is a Catholic church in the city of Fribourg, Switzerland. Dedicated to Notre-Dame, it was elevated to the rank of minor basilica in 1932 by Pope Pius XI. It is part of the Diocese of Lausanne, Geneva and Fribourg.

== History and description ==
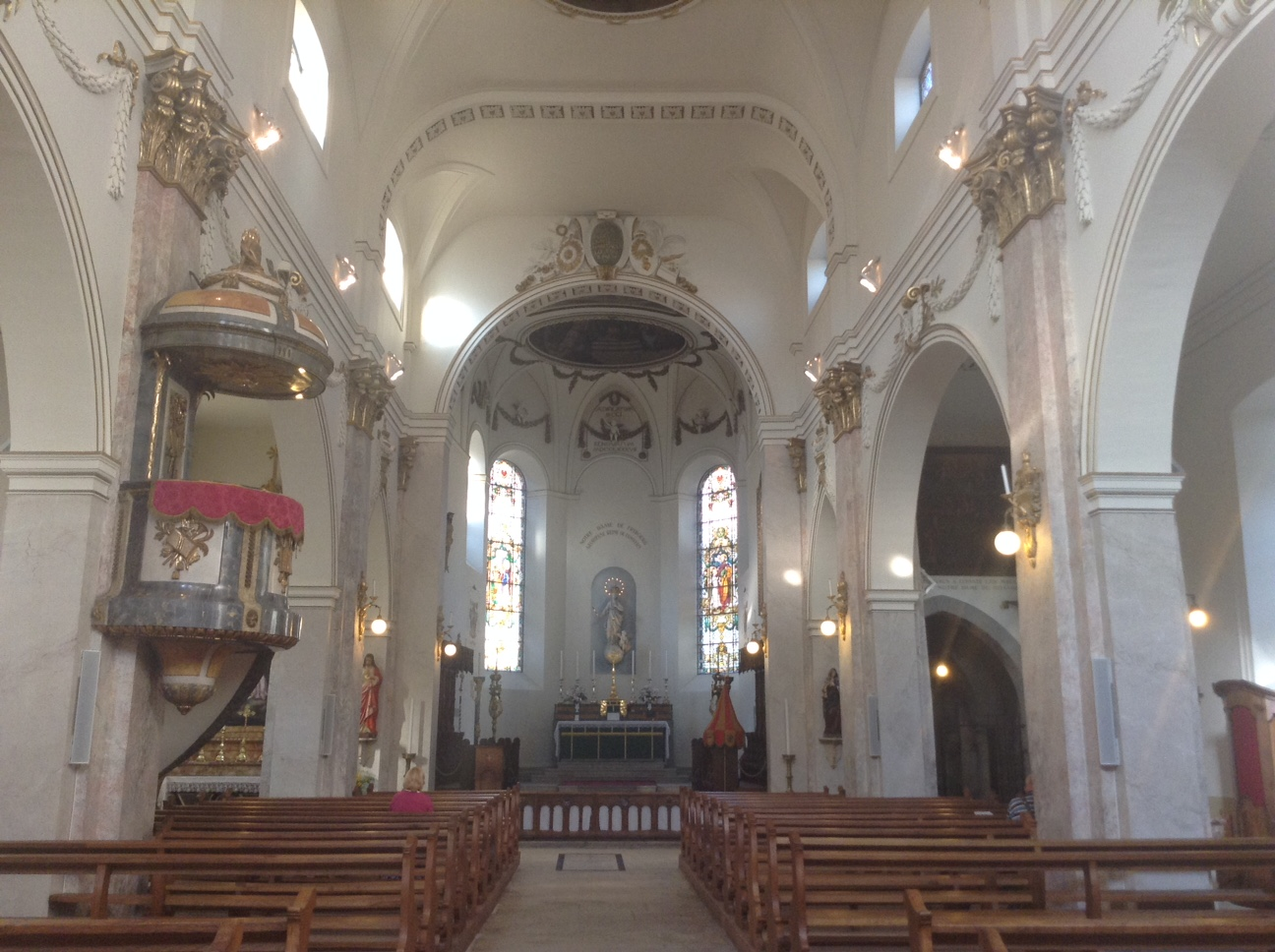
Interior of the basilica

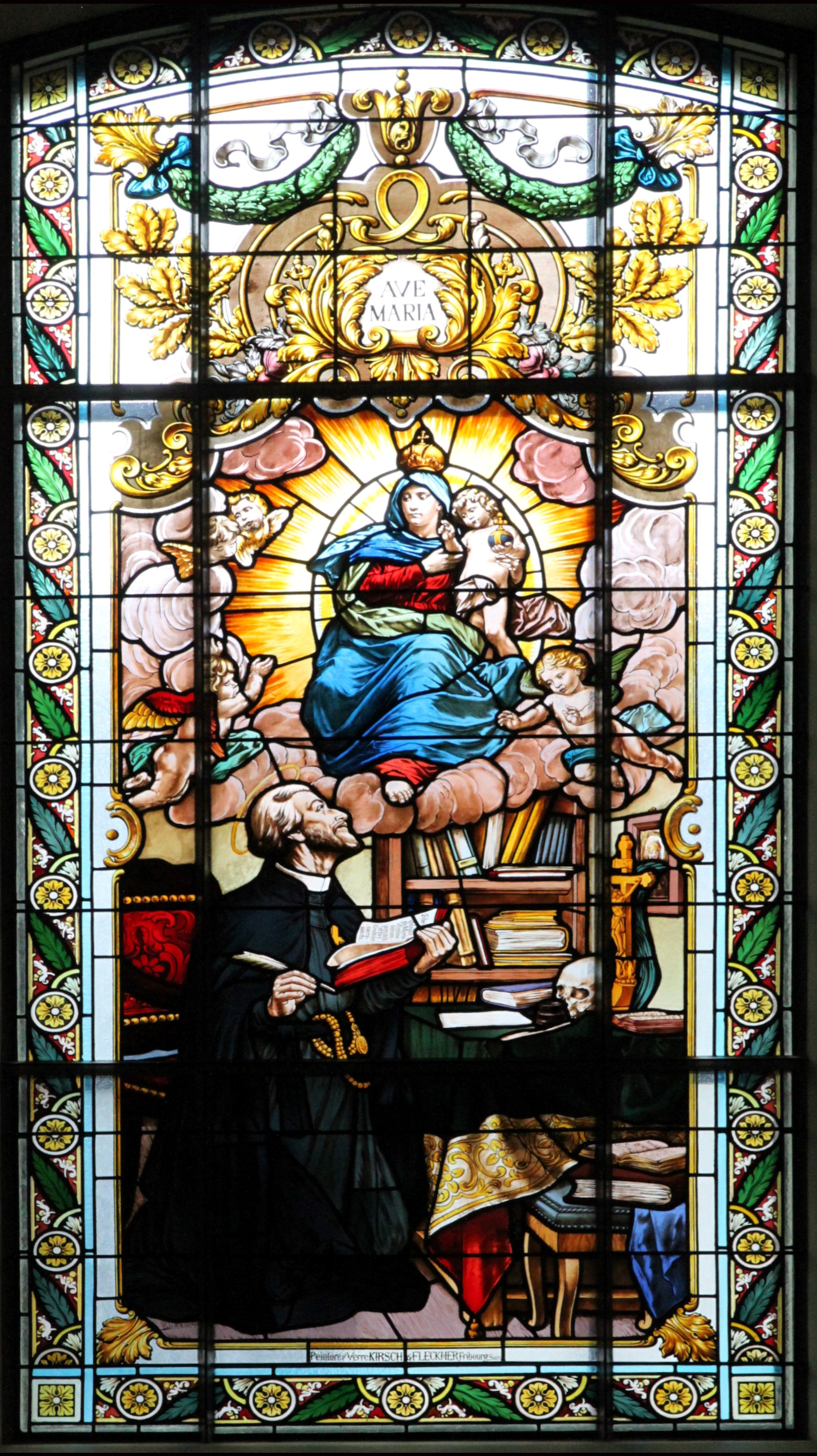
Saint Peter Canisius and the Assumption, stained glass in Notre-Dame de Fribourg

This Romanesque church dates back to the early 12th century and is located next to the Zaehringen Bridge. It is thus the oldest church in the city. Significant work took place between 1467 and 1525, including the addition of a spire to the bell tower and the reconstruction of the pentagonal chancel with a semi-circular apse. Saint Peter Canisius founded the Congregation of the Virgin here. The church was granted the title of collegiate church in 1728 (affiliated with the Basilica of Saint John Lateran), and its clergy became canons. The church belonged to the Bourgeois Hospital for a long time before being transferred to the diocese in 1884. The neoclassical façade was built between 1785 and 1787, and the new spire and interior decoration date from this period. In recent decades, the church was at risk of collapse due to neglect. Restoration work ultimately saved it. The Notre-Dame Basilica Foundation, established in 1968 and which became its owner, now ensures its preservation. It was fully restored between 1990 and 2011.

Inside, there is a Neapolitan nativity scene from the 18th century.

The administration of the church has been entrusted since 2012 (the feast of Saints Peter and Paul) by Charles Morerod to the Priestly Fraternity of Saint Peter under the leadership of Abbot Arnaud Evrat today · ; services are therefore celebrated in Latin.

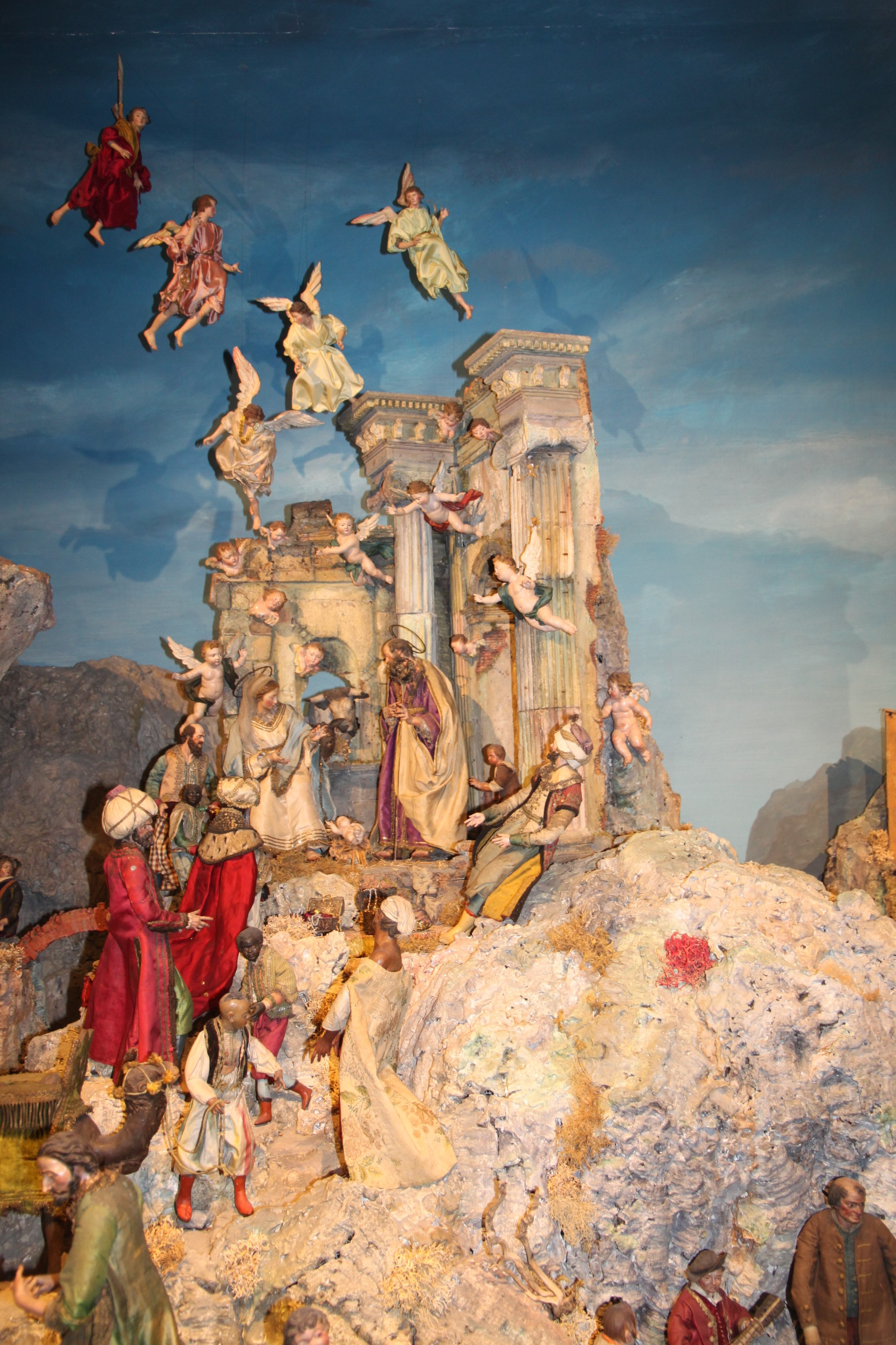
Central scene with the Nativity and the Three Wise Men, detail of the Neapolitan crèche

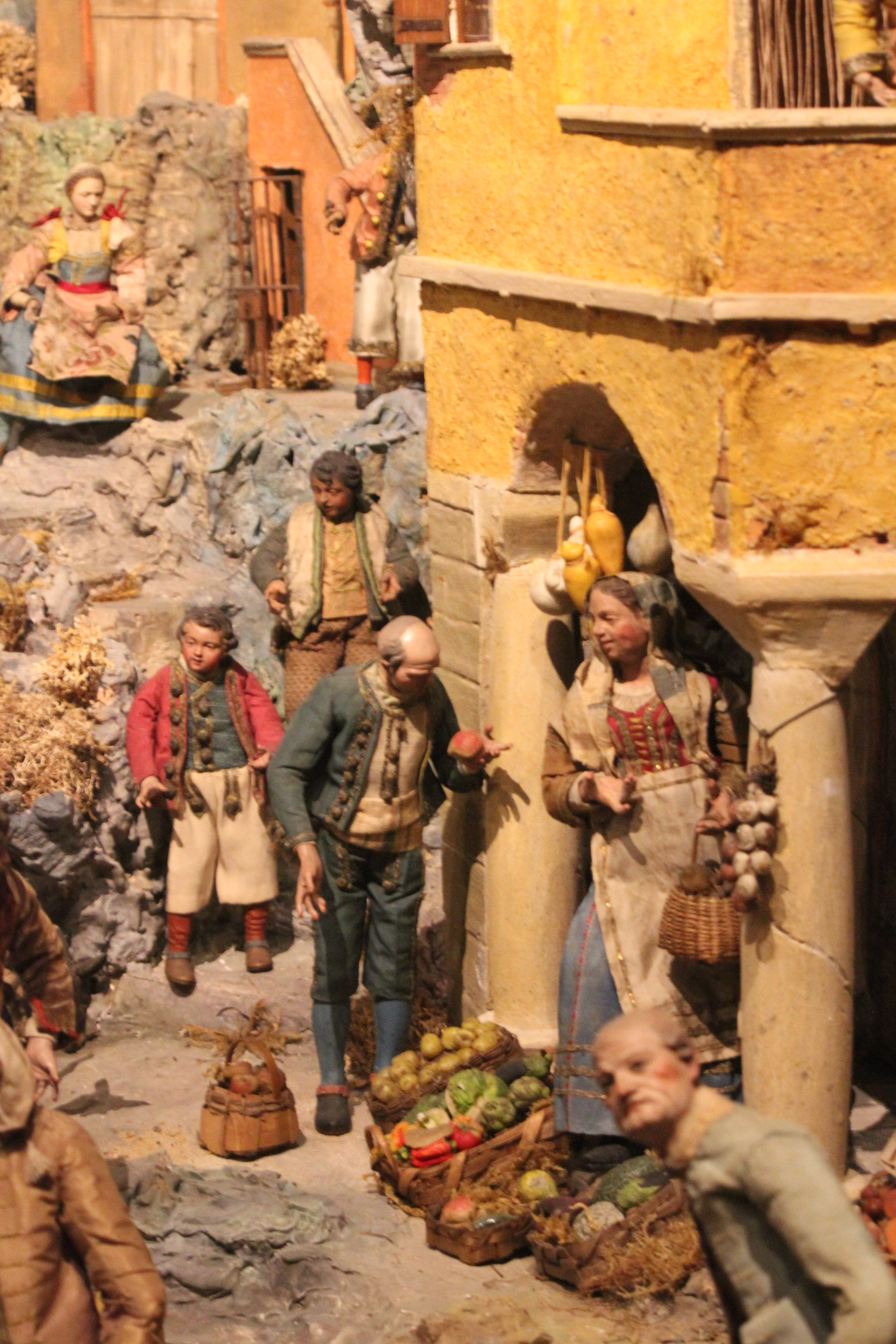
Street scene, detail of the Neapolitan crèche

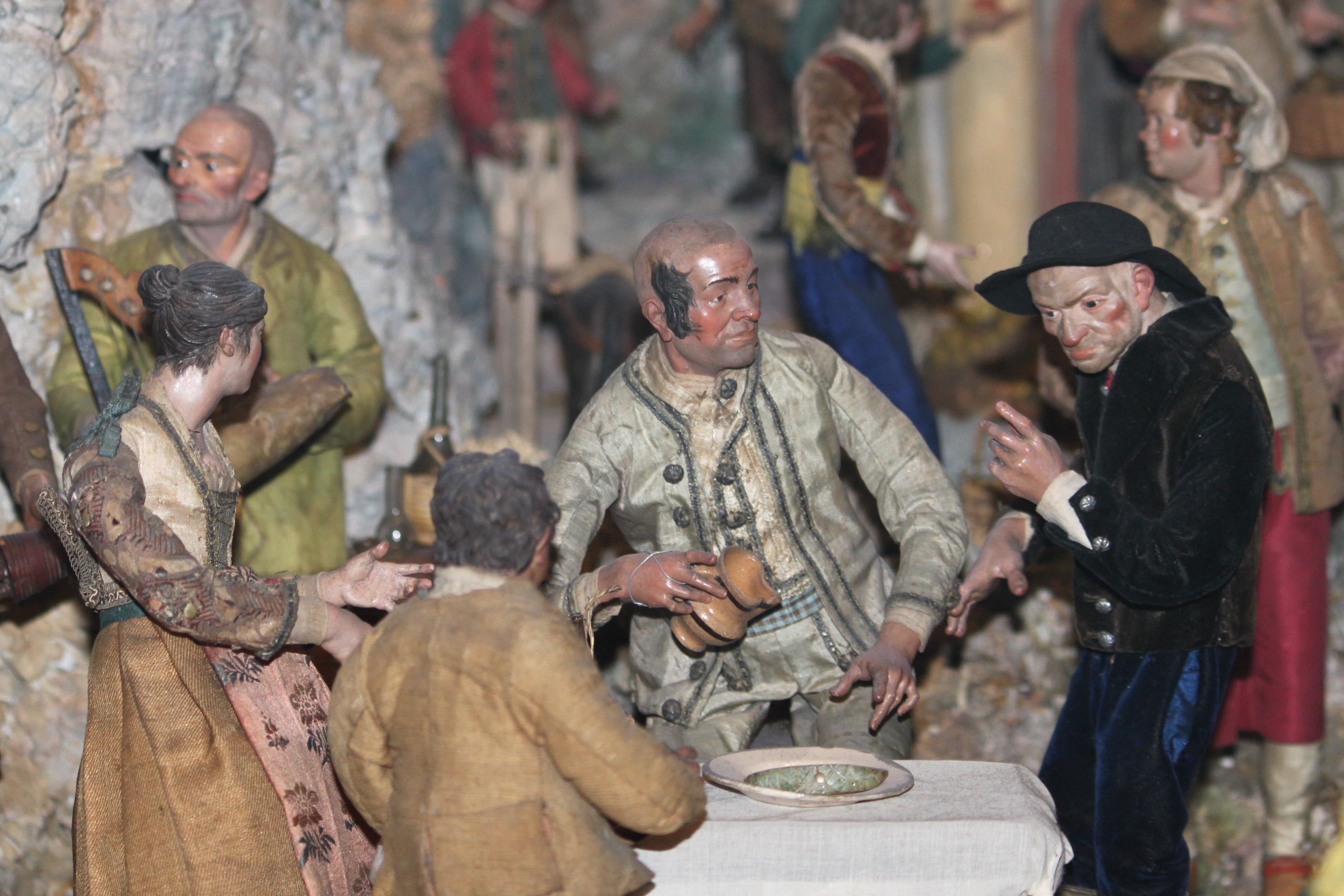
Tavern scene in the street, detail of the Neapolitan crèche

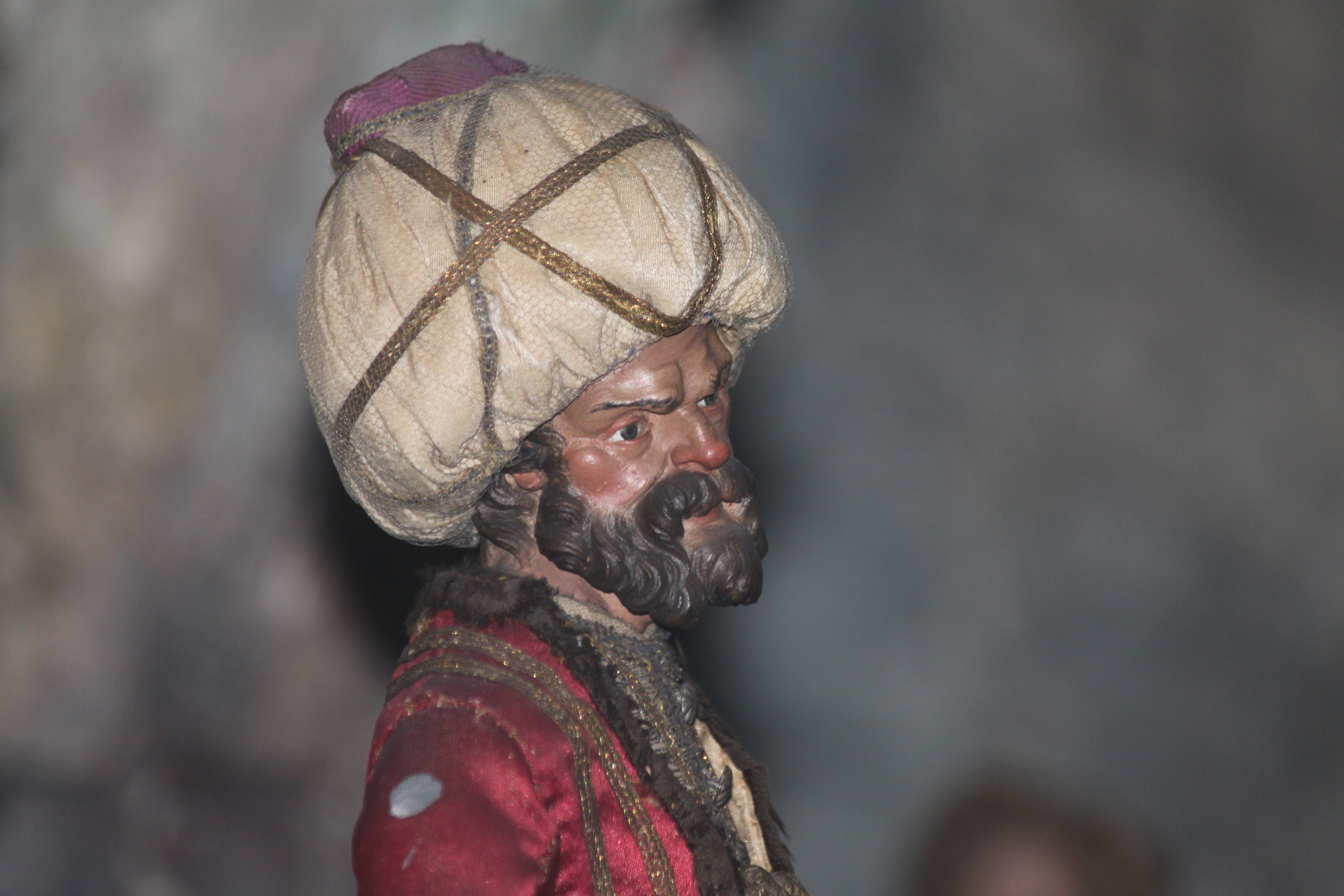
One of the Three Wise Men, detail of the Neapolitan crèche

== Bibliography ==
- Jacquin (1893). L'église Notre-Dame à Fribourg [The Church of Notre-Dame in Fribourg] (in French). Fribourg: Impr. catholique suisse. p. 55.
- Bourgarel, Gilles (2005). "La Basilique Notre-Dame : une vieille dame dévoile peu à peu ses merveilles" [The Basilica of Notre-Dame: an old lady gradually reveals her wonders]. Cahiers d'archéologie fribourgeoise = Freiburger Hefte für Archäologie (in French). 5. doi:10.5169/seals-389063.
