= La Maigrauge Abbey =

Monastery of Cistercian nuns in Fribourg, Switzerland

Coordinates: 46.800°N 7.158°E

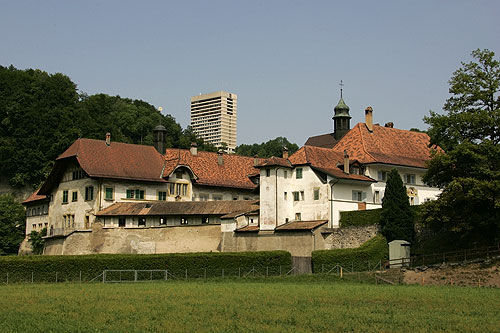
La Maigrauge Abbey

La Maigrauge Abbey or Magerau Abbey (French: Abbaye de la Maigrauge; German: Abtei Magerau) is a monastery of Cistercian nuns located in Fribourg, Switzerland, and founded in 1255. The abbey is situated on the Sarine River and lies on the border between French-speaking and German-speaking Switzerland. The community is bilingual.

== History ==
=== Origins ===
In the mid-1250s, a small group of women came together in the region of Fribourg to follow a life of prayer under the guidance of the Rule of St. Benedict. They seem to have been neither Beguines nor aristocrats, as so many foundresses of women's monasteries were. Their names have not even been preserved. They were given permission to live as a religious community by the pastor of Taval, in a document dated 3 July 1255, which they consider their date of foundation. The community, was allowed to live at the far western end of the parish, in a location called Richenza, an isolated, inhospitable terrain, surrounded by mountains.

Four years later, the little monastic community was given the lands they occupied, now called Auge maigre (English: Narrow Valley), by the local lord, Count Hartmann V of Kyburg. In 1261, the community was admitted to the Cistercian Order, only ten years after the Pope had acceded to the demands of the monks of the Order that no new foundations of Cistercians nuns were to be allowed. They were established as a dependency of the nearby men's Abbey of Hauterive, a relationship which continues into the 21st century.

The monastery was the first for nuns in Fribourg and remained the only one until the 17th century. The archives show that the nuns took in young girls for education, this, combined with gifts from incoming novices, allowed the monastery's holdings to expand slowly. Still, there were periods of poverty, when many applicants were accepted who arrived without being able to make donations to the monastery. Nonetheless, the abbey continued to thrive.

=== Reformation era ===
This growth slowed and a period of decline began for the abbey in the 15th century. The decline grew worse when the Protestant Reformation took hold in Switzerland during the 16th century. The community held on, though diminished in numbers, resisting a proposed closure, which the authorities were urging for financial reasons. Finally, in 1602, the community began to seek to re-establish a strict observance of the Benedictine Rule. This ran counter to the level of observance among monastic communities of the day. Even the Abbey of Citeaux, the motherhouse of the whole Order, had abandoned practices considered to be essential to monastic life, as envisioned in the Rule.

This new spirit led to a period of fifty years of flowering for the community under the leadership of two great abbesses. The first, Anne Techtermann (1607-1654), was a leader of the reform movement, and, at the same time, oversaw a significant renovation and expansion of the abbey buildings and walls. In 1625, she led the 25 members of the abbey in signing a document committing themselves to the practice of perpetual abstinence, which was symbolic of a strict observance. She was succeeded briefly as abbess by a woman of deep spiritual gifts, Anne Elisabeth Gottrau (1654-1657), who died of breast cancer but whose holiness is still remembered in the community.

Unfortunately, on the evening of 17 November 1660, a nun left a burning candle in her cell, while the community was in the church for Compline. The bulk of the abbey was still built of wood. As a result, the entire dormitory and most other parts of the abbey were burnt to the ground. Only the church, the infirmary and the Abbess' quarters were built of stone, and thus spared destruction. The nuns had to rebuild the majority of the abbey complex.

=== Revolution and Civil War ===
As the 18th century began, there was a slow breakdown in monastic discipline. Regular canonical visitations by other members of the Cistercian Order, as required by Church law, became infrequent or ceased all together. Once again, a lack of revenues prompted Church authorities to urge the closing of the abbey, this time for a merger with another monastery, that of the Abbaye de la Fille-Dieu, another Cistercian monastery of nuns in Romont in the same canton of Fribourg. The community was able to endure, even through the occupation of Fribourg by the French Revolutionary Army. The abbey was saved, only to face the consequences of the Swiss civil war (November 1847), which brought to an end the independence of the Swiss cantons, to be replaced by the federal system still in place. The war had been waged along religious lines, with the predominantly Catholic cantons in the South being the losers to the predominantly Protestant cantons.

The repercussions came quickly. The Abbey of Hauterive, upon which La Maigrauge depended spiritually, was suppressed in 1848. The following year, Abbess Marie-Bernardine Castella (1838-1849) was required to hand over the goods and archives of the Abbey to the cantonal officials, and had to agree to cease taking candidates to the community. Little surprise that she died the following year.

=== Life today ===
With time, the anti-Catholic measures were relaxed, and the nuns were able to start receiving candidates again. The Abbey of Hauterive was re-occupied in 1939 by Cistercian nuns from Austria. Today, the community numbers about a dozen nuns. They are currently led by Abbess Marianne Zürcher, O.Cist.

Besides running a bakery for communion wafers and a guesthouse to support themselves, the nuns also maintain a biogarden and a liqueur shop, which sells the abbey's cordial, made from the herbs grown in that same garden, and which is known as Grüneswasser or l'eau vert ("green water").

== Sources ==
- website of the Abbey "History of La Maigrauge" (in French and German)

== See also ==
- Cistercian nuns
- Cistercian Order
- Citeaux Abbey
