= Jean Jacques Joseph d'Alt =

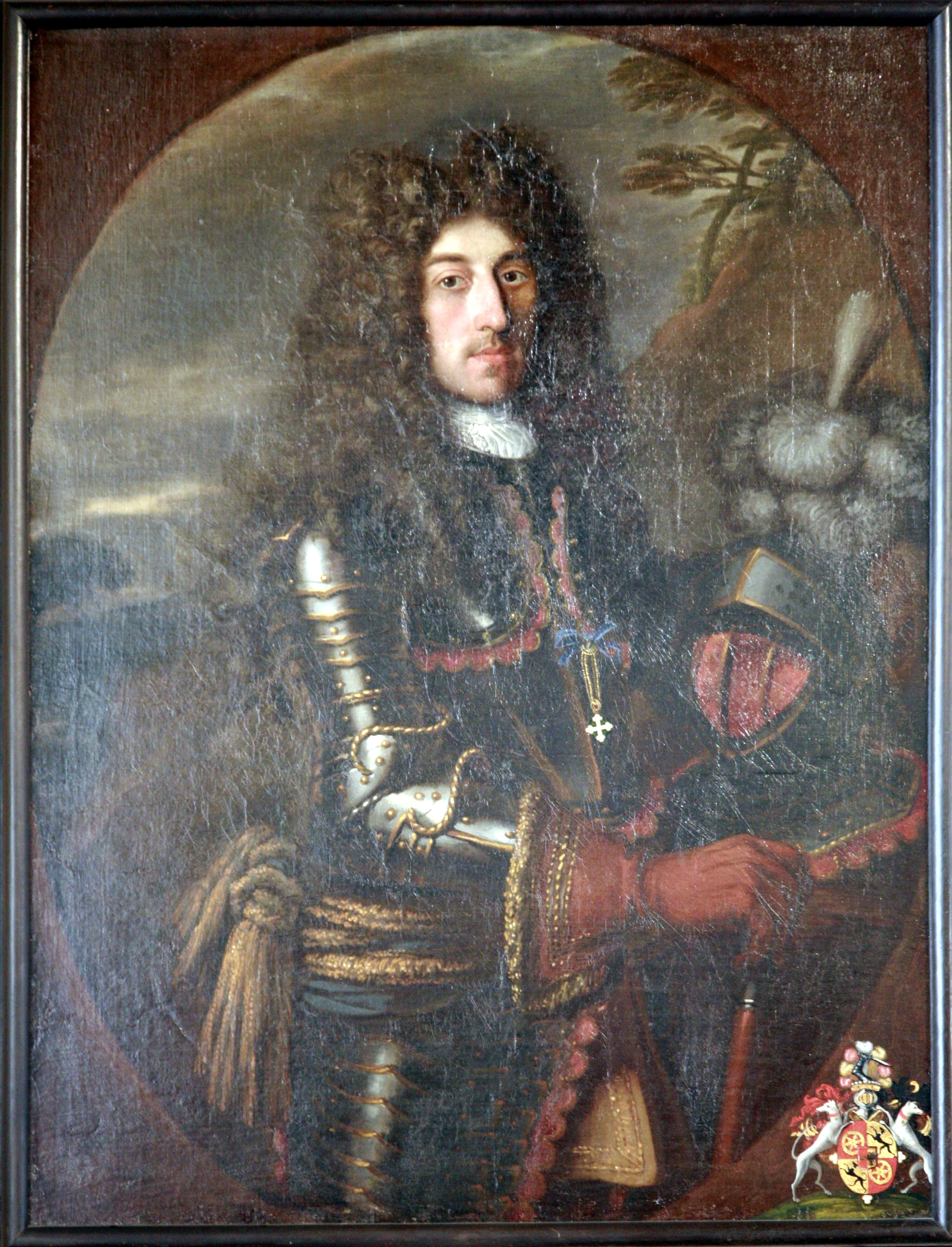
Portrait of Jean Jacques Joseph d'Alt in Gruyères Castle (c. 1704)

Jean Jacques Joseph d'Alt (Fribourg, 27 July 1653 — Lugano, 9 October 1714) was a Swiss mercenary and administrator.

== Biography ==
Born into an important patrician family of Fribourg, d'Alt was the son of Tobie-Protais d'Alt, a member of the city's Council of Two Hundred. He rose in rank among the local administration, culminating as bailiff of Gruyère between 1685 and 1690, and of Lugano between 1712 and 1714. He acquired the lordship of Prévondavaux in 1691.

d'Alt served in the French army during the Franco-Dutch War, from 1674 to 1678, as a captain in the Pfyffer Regiment. He was colonel of a Swiss regiment fighting for Savoy at the beginning of the War of the Spanish Succession, for which he was awarded the Order of Sts. Maurice and Lazarus. He was made a baron by Leopold I, Holy Roman Emperor in 1704.
