= Üechtland =

Region in western Switzerland

Coordinates: 46.770875°N 7.176793°E

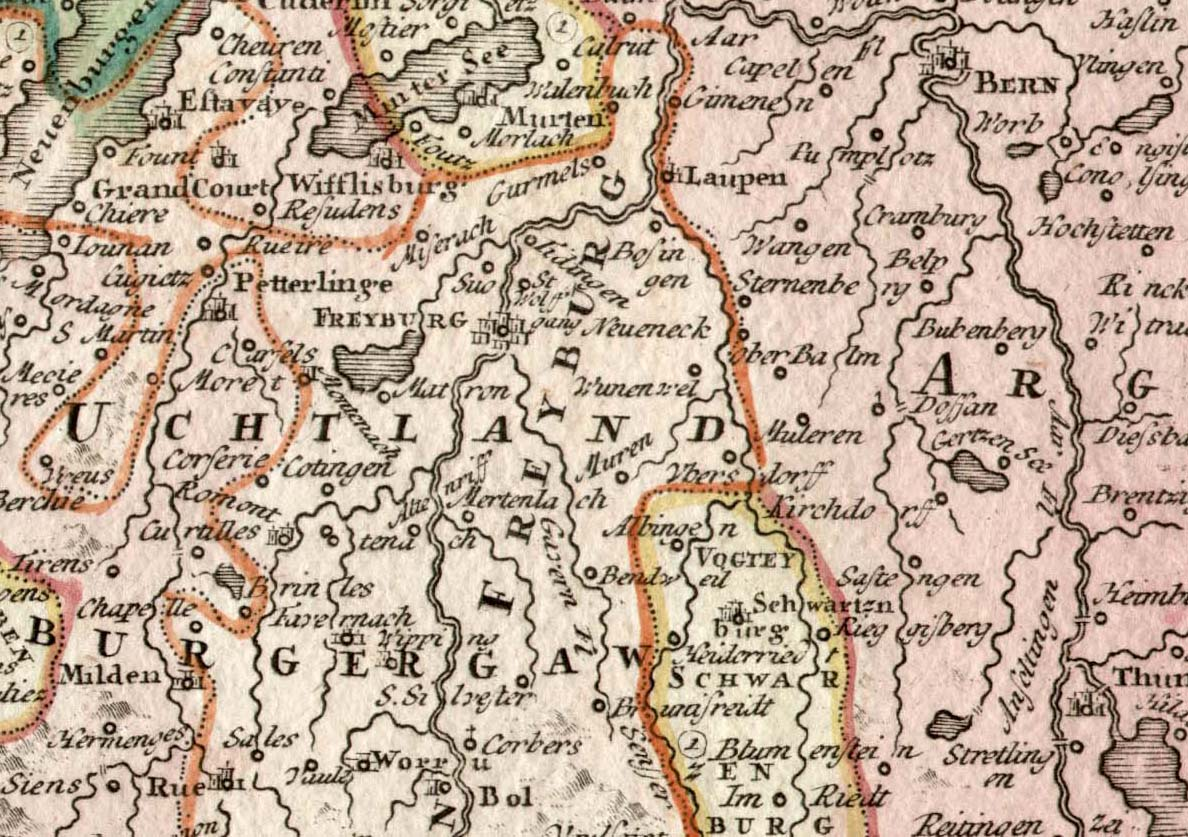
The Üechtland on a map from 1732

The Üechtland (Swiss Standard German: [ˈyːəçtland], Alemannic German: [ˈyə̯ɣ̊d̥lɒnd̥]), alternatively spelled Üchtland and Uechtland, is a region in western Switzerland, where the cities of Bern and Fribourg are located. The French name Nuithonie ("land of the Nuithones") is rarely used.

The name for the region is obsolete; today, it is only used to distinguish Freiburg im Üechtland (Fribourg) from Freiburg im Breisgau in Germany. However, old documents also refer to Bern im Üechtland, distinguishing Bern from Verona in Italy (historically known in German as Bern or Wälsch-Bern).

== Sources ==
- Wulf Müller, Ernst Tremp: Üchtland in German, French and Italian in the online Historical Dictionary of Switzerland.
