= Jean-Baptiste Girard (pedagogue) =

Swiss Franciscan educator (1765–1850)

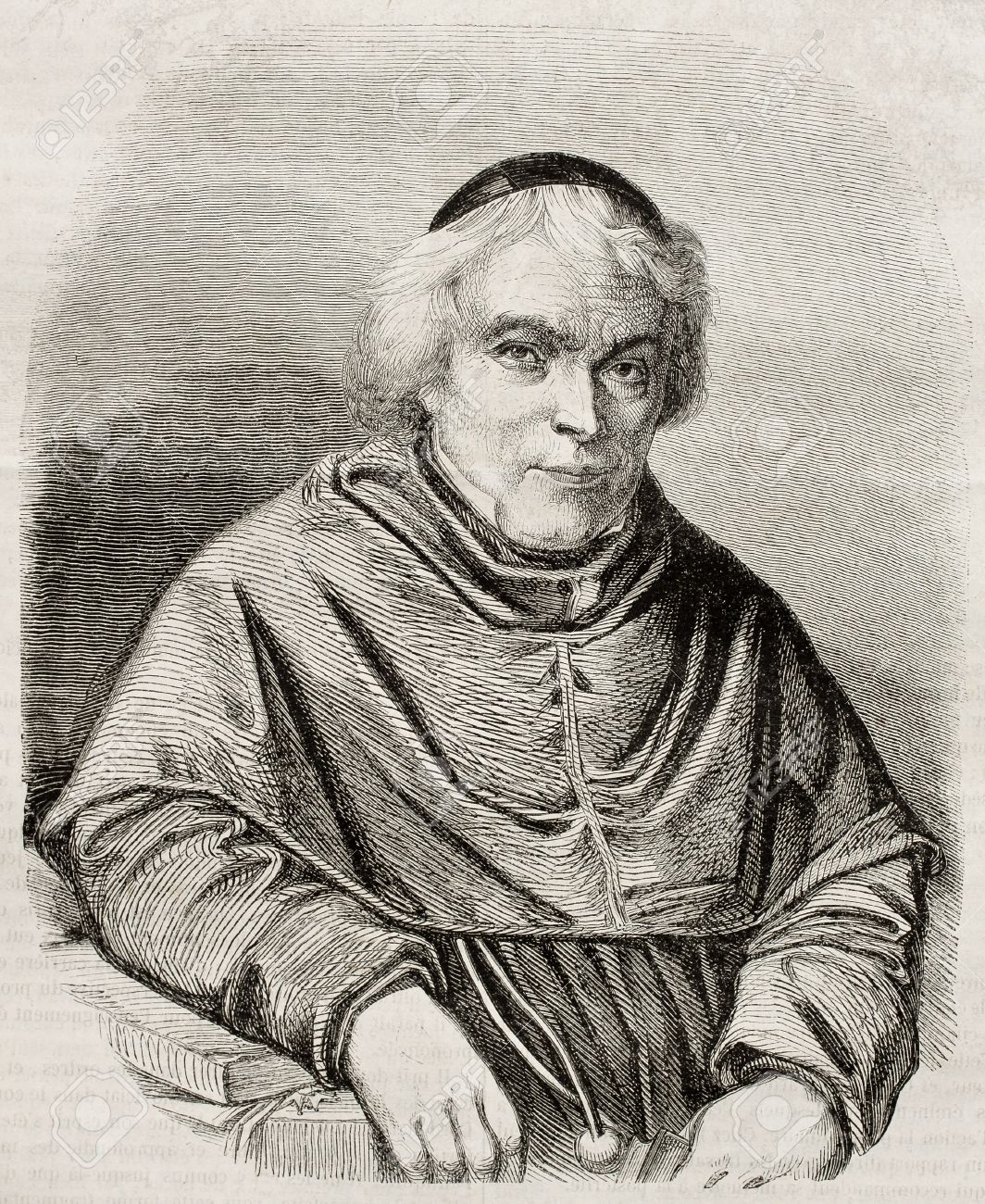
Jean-Baptiste Girard

Grégoire Girard [known as “Le Père Girard” or “Le Père Gregoire”] (17 December 1765 at Fribourg – 6 March 1850 in Fribourg) was a Swiss Franciscan educator.

== Life ==
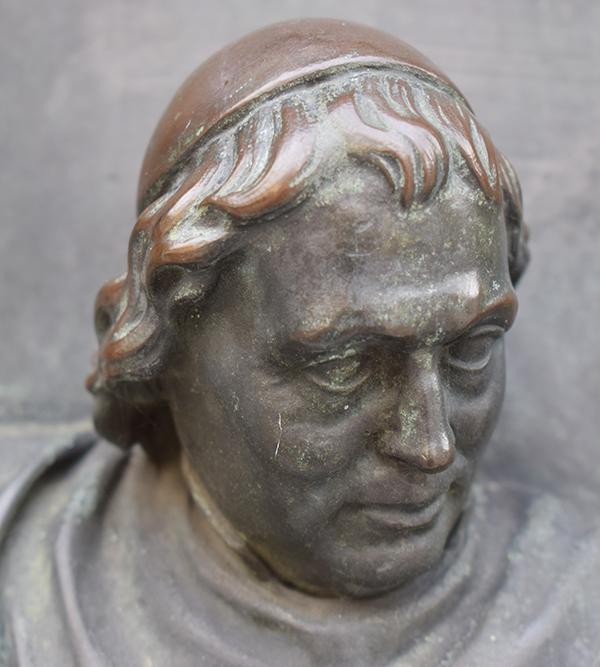
Statue of Jean-Baptiste Girard (detail) at Fribourg.

He was the fifth child in a family of fourteen, and his gift for teaching was early shown at home in helping his mother with the younger children. At sixteen he entered the novitiate of the Franciscans at Lucerne; after spending some time teaching in the colleges of the order, he went to Würzburg for his philosophical and theological studies, and was there ordained to the priesthood.

Returning to Fribourg in 1789, he spent ten years in missionary work and in teaching philosophy to the young men of his order. Upon the invitation of Stapfer, minister of arts and sciences, in 1798 he published an essay outlining a scheme of national Swiss education. His orthodoxy came under some suspicion, caused by his admiration for Kantian ideas, which was evident in his essay.

Girard was called to Verne where he remained four years. In 1804 he was recalled to Fribourg, and took up work in the primary schools. As director of the schools in Fribourg (1807–1823), Girard made education compulsory, organized the school administration, insisted on the adoption of good textbooks and methods, and introduced the monitorial system, avoiding the abuse of mere memory exercise and making every study converge to the child's complete education. In 1809 Girard was sent to Yverdon-les-Bains to make a report to the Government on Pestalozzi's institution. He had met the latter in Bern and professed admiration for his ability as an educator, while differing from him on several important points, especially on the value of the monitorial system.

Girard's successful reforms at Fribourg were the occasion for bitter opposition. Girard's application of the monitorial system was opposed by the bishop and the civil authorities of Fribourg in 1823. Jesuit hostility resulted in him being driven away from his position, and he then went to work in the gymnasium at Lucerne as professor of philosophy. In 1834 he returned to Fribourg, where he remained till his death, engaged in educational pursuits and in the publication of some of his works.

== Reputation ==
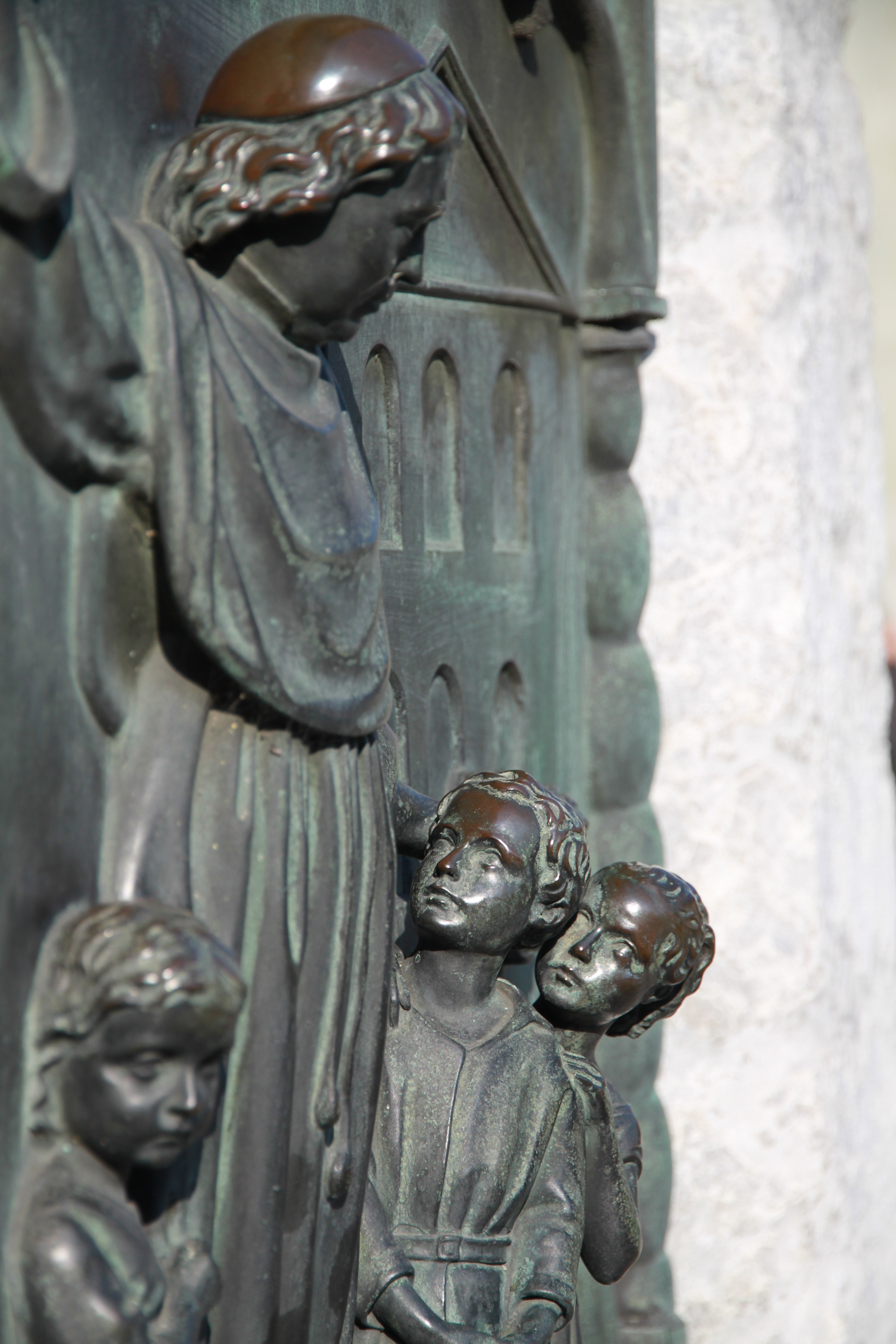
Relief which shows Girard surrounded by children (detail)

Girard was a Knight of the Legion of Honour, and a corresponding member of the Académie des Sciences morales et politiques.

In an 1832 treatise on public education, François Marc Louis Naville praised Girard for his method of teaching by actively interesting his students in their lessons.

Girard's undogmatic method and his Liberal Christianity brought him into conflict with the Jesuits, but his aim was, in all his teaching, to introduce the moral idea into the minds of his pupils by familiarizing them with the right or wrong working of the facts he brought to their attention, and thus to elevate character all through the educational curriculum.

== Works ==
Besides many reports and memoirs, his principal writings are:

- Cours de philosophie fait au Lycée de Lucerne (1829–31)
- De l'enseignement régulier de la langue maternelle (1834, 9th ed. 1894; Eng. trans. by Lord Ebrington, The Mother Tongue, 1847)
- Des moyens de stimuler l'activité dans les écoles (1835)
- Parallèle entre la philosophie et la physique (1840)
- Cours éducatif de langue maternelle (Paris, 1840–48)

Girard relied heavily on concrete examples in his pedagogical writing, avoiding abstractions but gradually introducing complications.
