= Lac de Pérolles =

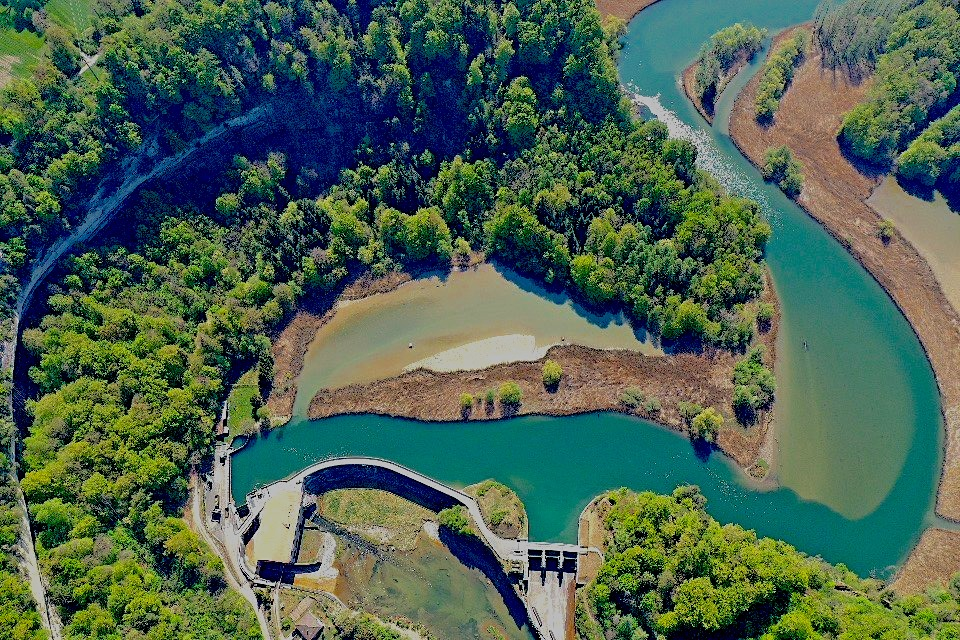
- View near Maigrauge Dam (at right)

- Location within Canton of Fribourg Location within Switzerland Location within Alps
- Interactive map of Lac de Pérolles
- Location: Fribourg, Canton of Fribourg
- Coordinates: 46°47′45.30″N 7°9′45.35″E
- Type: reservoir
- Primary inflows: Saane/Sarine
- Primary outflows: Saane/Sarine
- Catchment area: 1,250 km^{2} (480 sq mi)
- Basin countries: Switzerland
- Max. length: 2.3 km (1.4 mi)
- Surface area: 0.35 km^{2} (35 ha; 86 acres)
- Water volume: 400,000 m^{3} (14,000,000 cu ft)
- Surface elevation: 553.3 m (1,815 ft)

Lac de Pérolles, a reservoir formed by Maigrauge Dam, is a reservoir on the Saane/Sarine river at Fribourg, in western Switzerland. Its surface area is 0.35 square kilometres (35 ha; 86 acres). The dam was built in 1872, and its height was increased by 2.5 metres (8.2 ft) in 1910. The watershed (or catchment) is 1,250 square kilometres (480 sq mi). The Maigrauge Dam has a gated spillway.
