= Madeleine Eggendorffer =

Swiss bookseller, publisher and businesswoman (1744–1795)

Madeleine Eggendorffer (born probably 30 June 1744 in Fribourg, Switzerland – died on 27 September 1795 in Fribourg), was a Swiss bookseller, publisher and businesswoman.

== Biography ==
Marie-Madeleine de Boffe and her brother Joseph were born to the bookseller Jean-Charles de Boffe and his wife Anne-Marie Jordan in Fribourg. In 1769, Madeleine married the Austrian Ludwig Wilhelm Eggendorffer who had been employed previously for a few months as a bookbinder for the de Boffe bookshop. When Jean-Charles de Boffe died in 1769, Joseph and Madeleine jointly inherited the bookstore but it went bankrupt in 1771, so Madeleine bought out Joseph's shares and she took over sole ownership of the store.

After she gave birth to her first child, Madeleine Eggendorffer continued her work as a bookseller. She eventually had four children. As the manager of the only bookstore in Fribourg, she was assisted by her husband as a bookbinder. She successfully operated the bookstore until her death in 1795.

Her catalogue indicates that she sold mainly French books, but also some German and Latin titles. Her catalogue listed works by authors such as La Fontaine, Rabelais, Voltaire, and Diderot. In addition, she included a number of female authors including, Madame du Boccage, the Marquise de Lambert, Madame de Maintenon and Madame de Sévigné. As an editor, Madeleine Eggendorffer published Culture des abeilles ou Méthode expérimentale et raisonnée sur les moyens de prendre mieux par des abeilles (about bee cultivation) by Abbé François-Xavier Duchet (active in Remaufens) as well as the 8 volumes of Military and Diplomatic History of Switzerland by Beat Emanuel von May, known as May de Romainmôtier (1788).

To further her business, she attended the fairs of Bern for three weeks where she would set up a shop to sell her books and take orders from customers. Literary and legal books were the most in demand, with religious texts second. She stayed in close contact with other booksellers in Switzerland (mainly through the Typographical Society of Neuchâtel) and France (Lyon, Paris).

It's notable that Madeleine Eggendorffer essentially ran a monopoly on printed works in Fribourg and was the active owner and operator of the bookstore despite being a mother and married woman (not widowed or single).

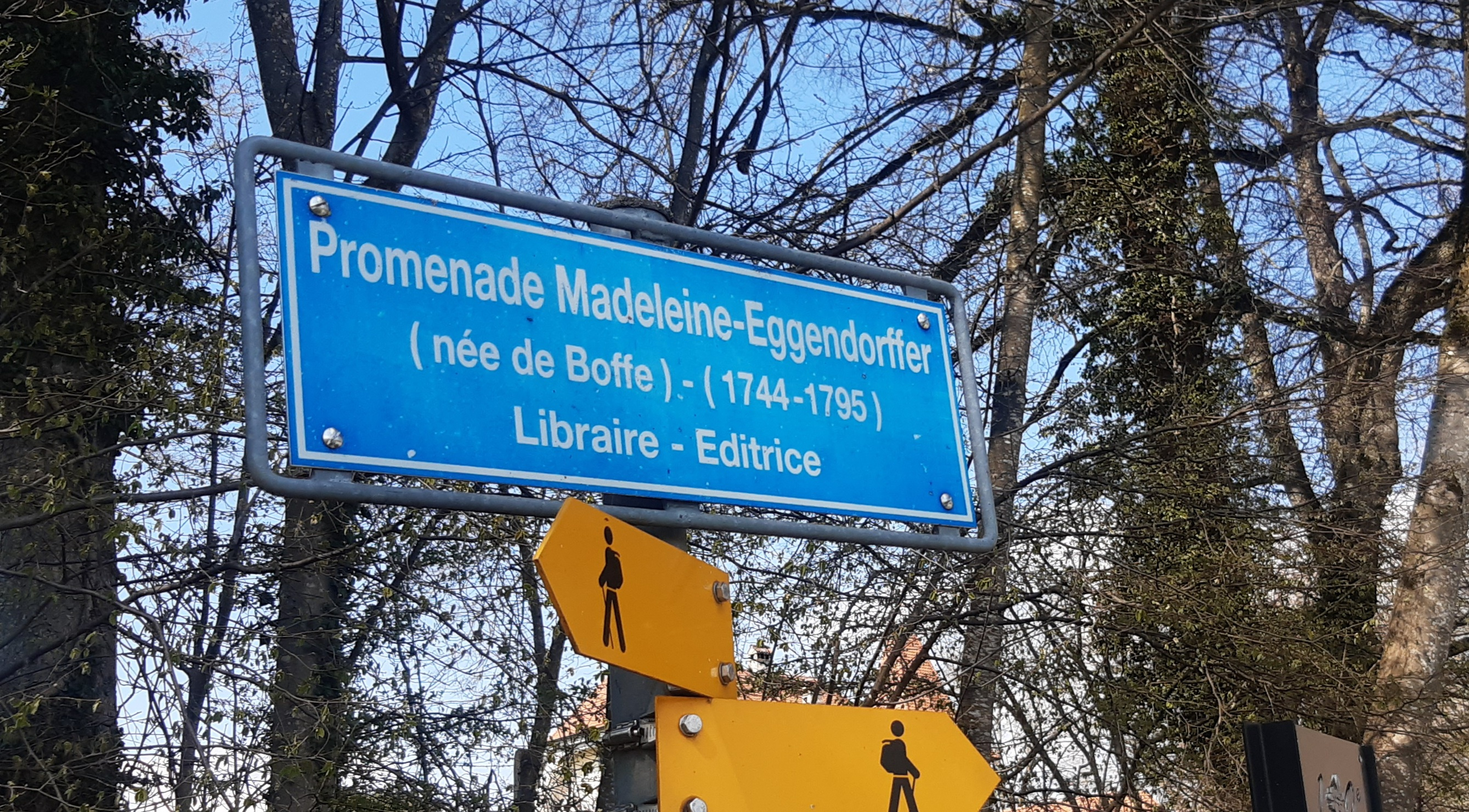
Pathway named for Madeleine Eggendorffer, in the hamlet of Bourguillon, Switzerland in 2021.

The professional life of Madeleine Eggendorffer was recorded and kept through her extensive correspondence with the Neuchâtel Typographical Society.

After Madeleine Eggendorffer died on 27 September 1795 in Fribourg, her husband took over the business, and he was succeeded by their son Aloys Eggendorffer, known as Louis. Thus, the name Eggendorffer retained its prominence in the world of Fribourg bookstores until the middle of the 19th century.
