= Teysachaux =

Mountain in Switzerland

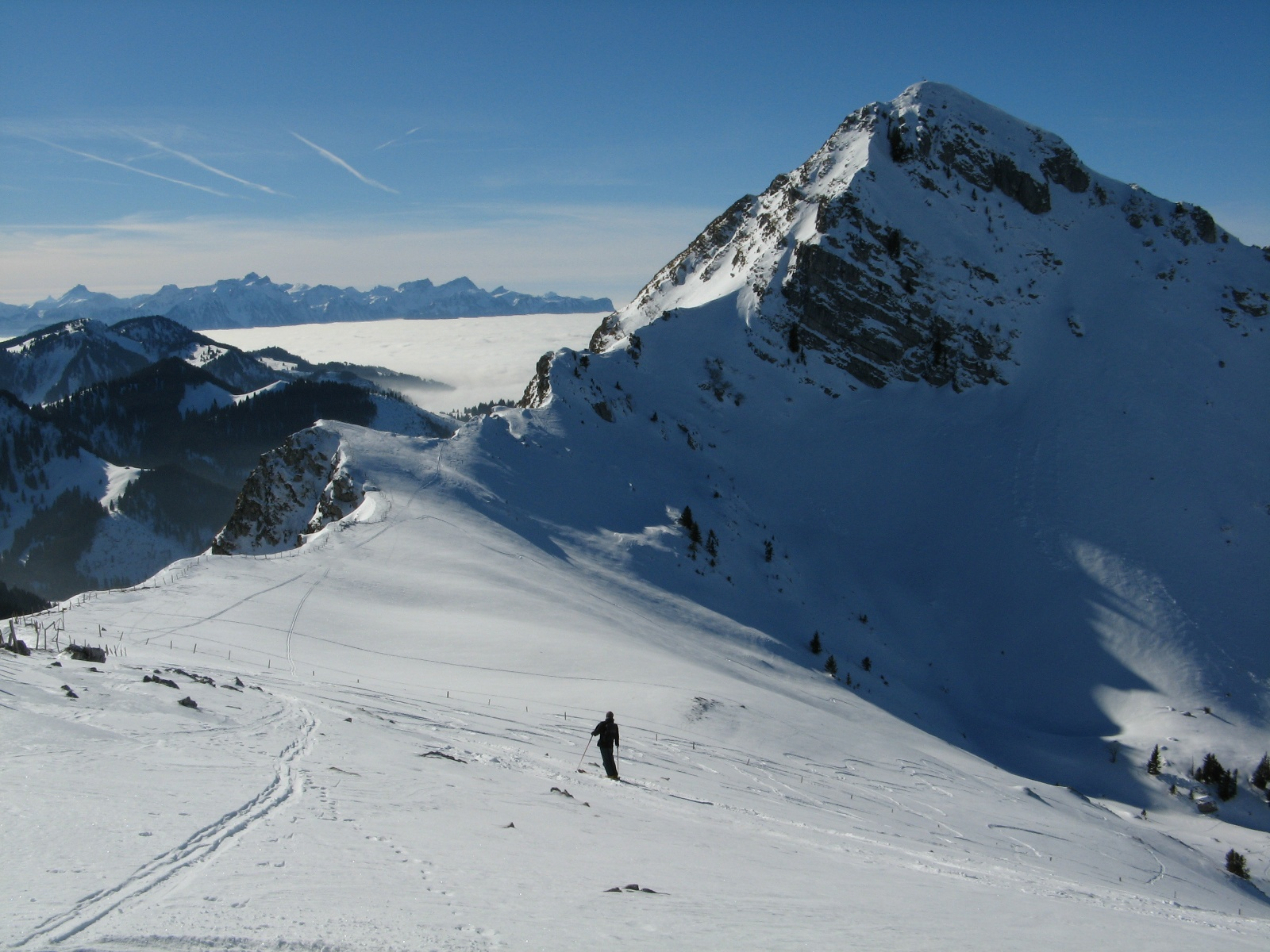
- View from the north side

Highest point
- Elevation: 1,909 m (6,263 ft)
- Prominence: 139 m (456 ft)
- Parent peak: Moléson
- Coordinates: 46°32′3″N 6°59′47″E

Geography
- Location within Switzerland
- Location: Fribourg, Switzerland
- Parent range: Swiss Prealps

Teysachaux (1,909 m) is a mountain of the Swiss Prealps, overlooking Les Paccots in the canton of Fribourg.

== Toponymy ==
In patois, Teysachaux is the contraction of taiza ("spread") and chaux ("meadow").

== Geography ==
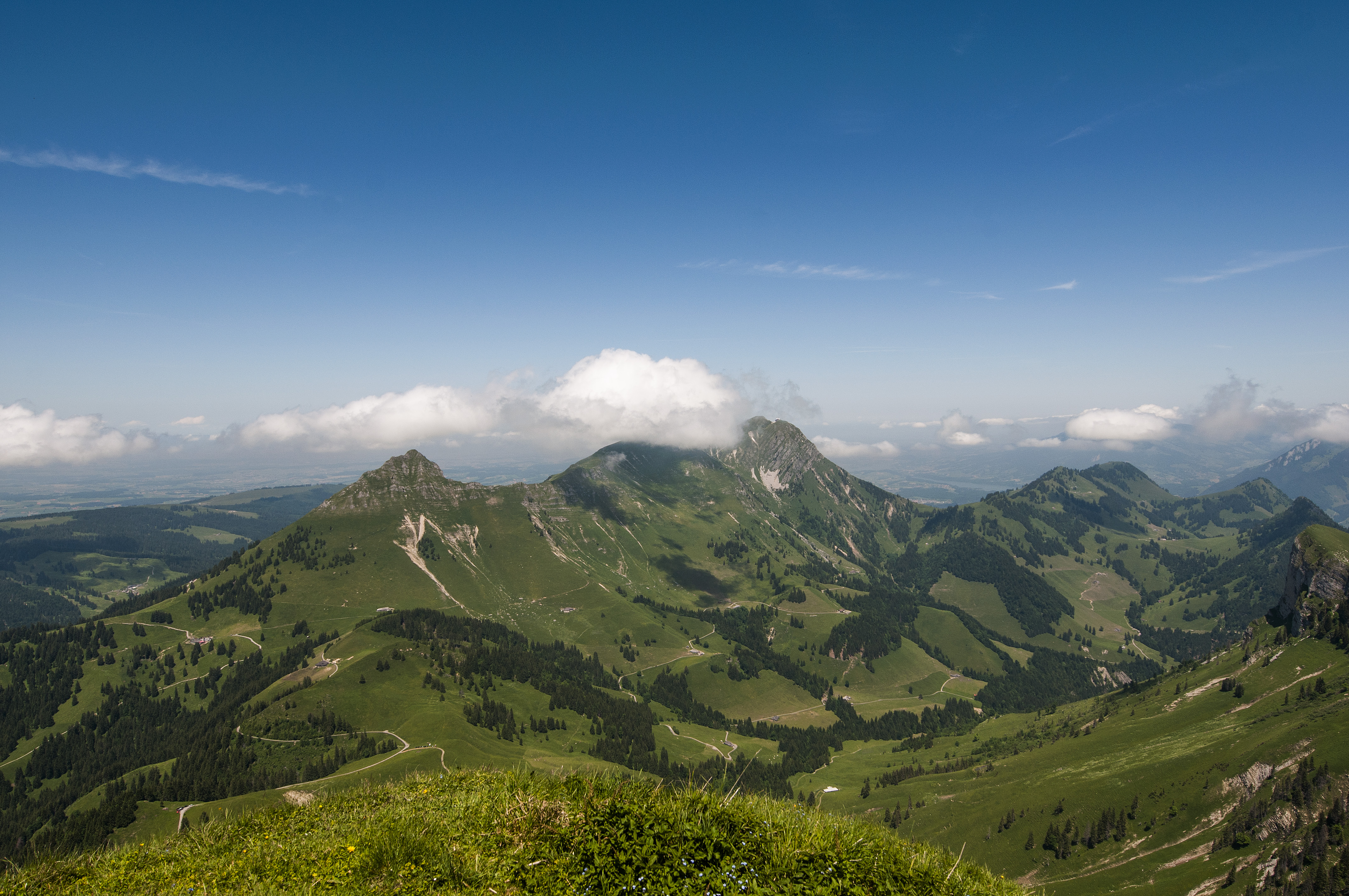
View of Teysachaux from the summit of Dent de Lys.

Teysachaux lies at the south end of the Moléson ridge, west of the Sarine river valley. Nearby summits include Niremont on the west side and Dent de Lys on the south side.

Several chalets (some of them have been converted into small restaurants) can be found on Teysachaux's slopes. They have been built during the 18th and 19th century, showing the evidence of a progressive expansion of farming (mainly milk and cheese) towards higher meadows.

== History ==
In 1870, on the foothills of the west side of Teysachaux, a 2-meters long fossilised ichthyosaurus has been discovered. It dates from the Jurassic period (175 to 183 million years), when dinosaurs walked the Earth. This fossil is now part of the permanent exhibition at the Museum of Natural History of Fribourg

== See also ==
- Moléson
- Les Paccots
