= Col de Soladier =

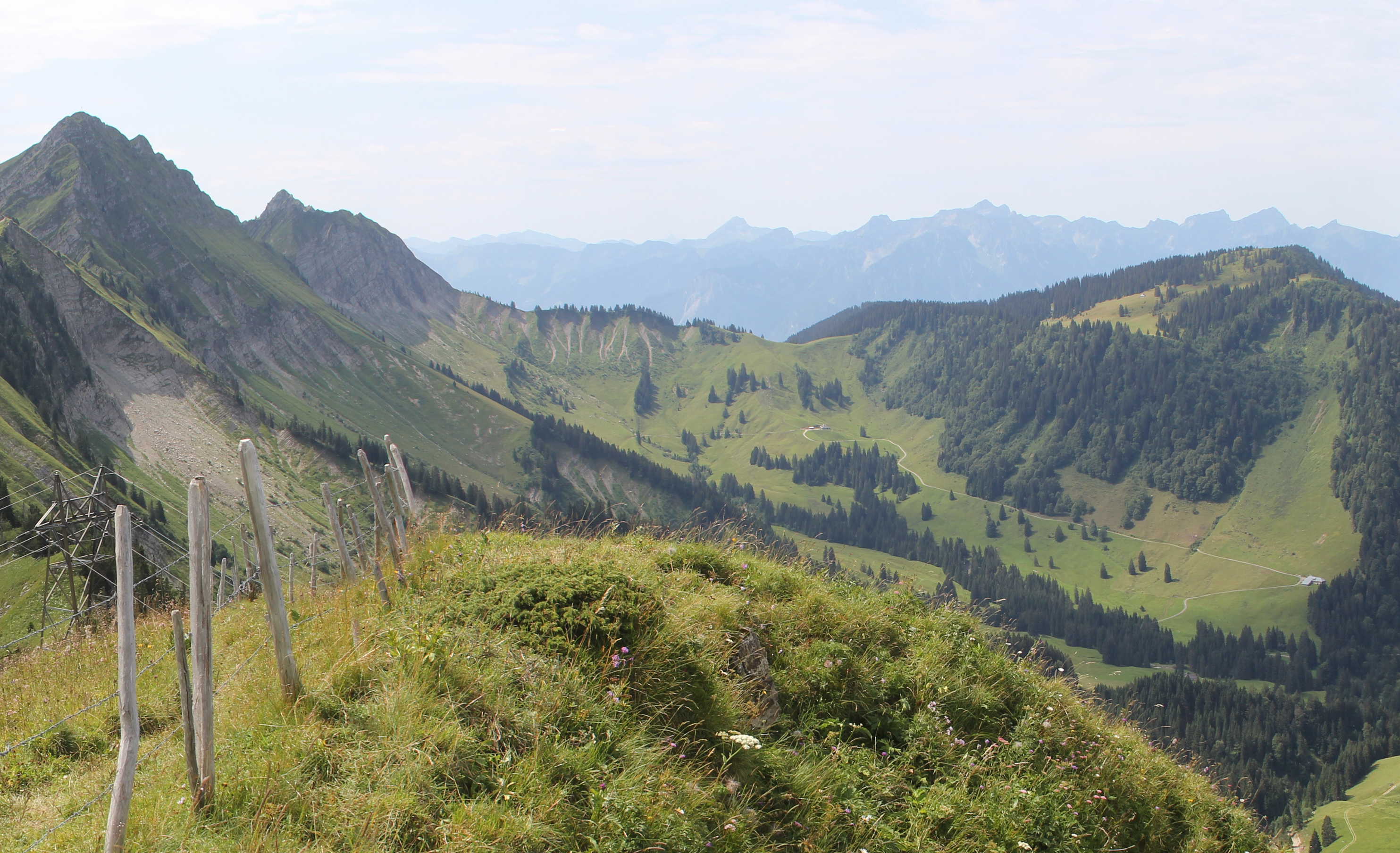
- Col de Soladier between Vanil des Artses and Le Pila on the left and Le Molard on the right

- Location within Switzerland
- Elevation: 1,576 metres (5,171 ft)

Third Approach
- Location: Vaud, Switzerland
- Range: Bernese Alps
- Coordinates: 46°28′36″N 6°58′02″E

The col de Soladier (1,576 m or 5,171 ft) is a mountain pass in the canton de Vaud, in Switzerland. It is located 1 km west of a ridge linking the Vanil des Artses and the Cape au Moine, and east of Le Molard.

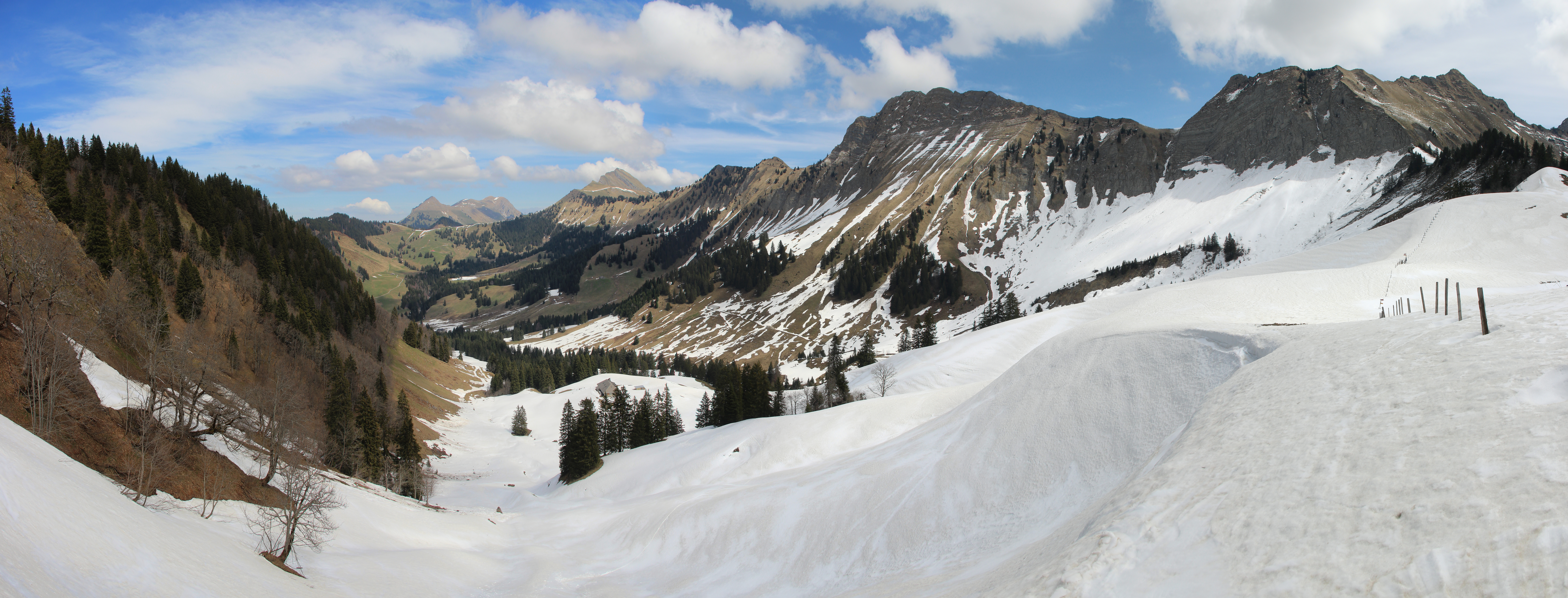
View from the col de Soladier, heading north

== Toponymy ==
In vaudois dialect, its name is sor la diez, which means : on the spring.

== Activities ==
The col de Soladier is a popular destination for hiking, mountain biking, snowshoeing and ski touring. It is possible to reach the col de Jaman by using a small mountain trail.

== See also ==
- Col de Jaman
- Cape au Moine
