= Cape au Moine =

Mountain in Switzerland

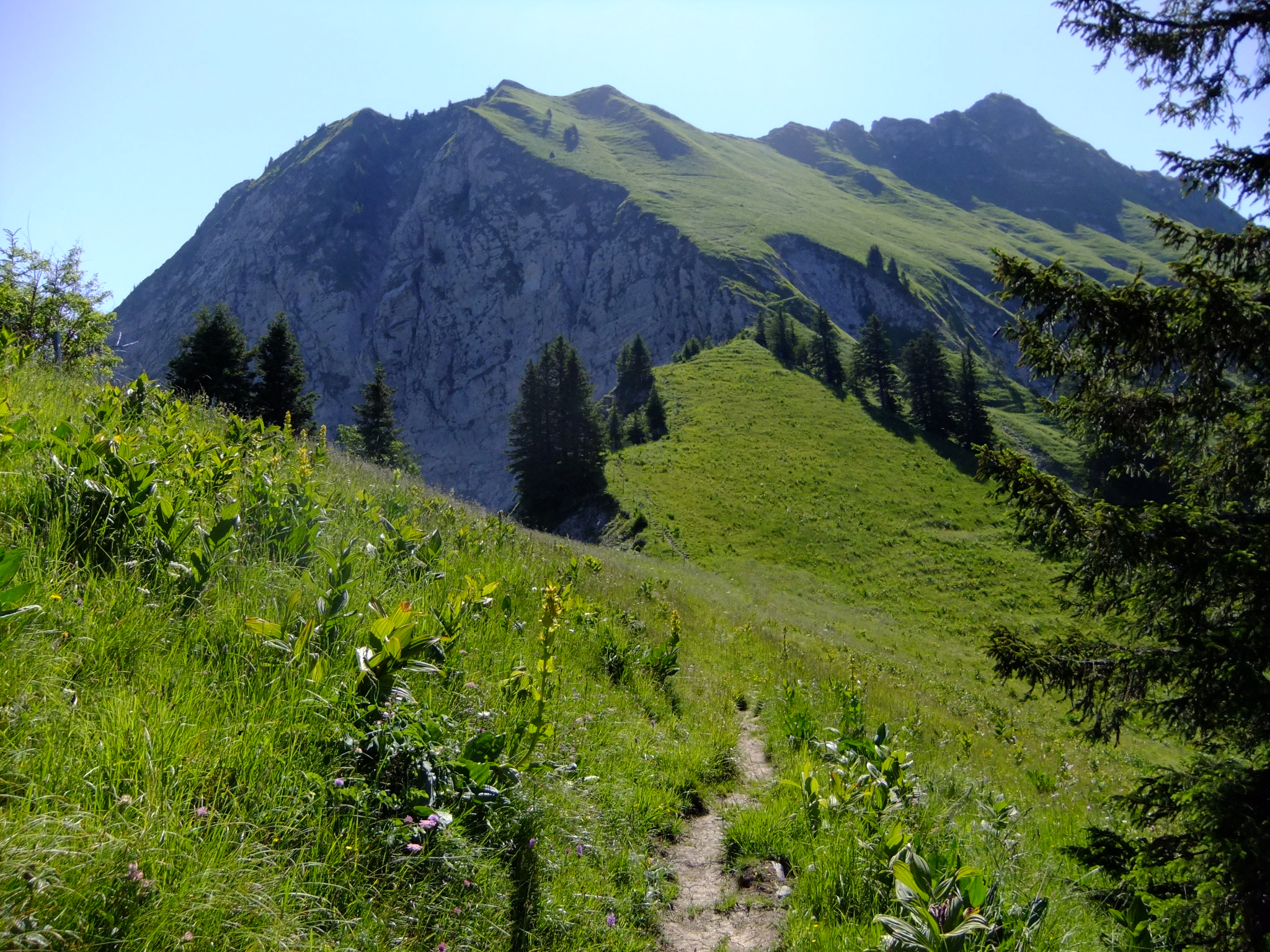
- View from the west side

Highest point
- Elevation: 1,941 m (6,368 ft)
- Prominence: 150 m (490 ft)
- Parent peak: Vanil des Artses
- Coordinates: 46°28′13″N 6°58′44″E

Geography
- Location within Switzerland
- Location: Vaud/Fribourg, Switzerland
- Parent range: Swiss Prealps

The Cape au Moine (1,941 m) is a mountain of the Swiss Prealps, located on the border between the cantons of Vaud and Fribourg. It lies north of the Col de Jaman and south of the Col de Soladier, among of a crest of peaks extending roughly north into Fribourg to the Dent de Lys, on the range between Lake Geneva and the valley of Gruyère.
