= Jaman Pass =

Jaman Pass may refer to:

- Col de Jaman, a mountain pass in the Swiss Alps
- Jaman Pass, a pass on the Afghanistan–Tajikistan border
