= Corbetta =

Corbetta may refer to:

- Corbetta, Lombardy, a commune in the province of Milan, Italy
- Corbetta (mountain), a mountain of the canton of Fribourg, in Switzerland
- Corbetta, a type of magazine (artillery). A Corbetta magazine is of concrete construction and is shaped like a beehive or dome. The domed shape is used for only the Corbetta ECM design. The interior wall is approximately three times the height of the magazine. There are currently no Dome designs approved for new construction.
- Francesco Corbetta, a guitarist and composer of the seventeenth century
- Marco Corbetta, a game programmer
- Maurizio Corbetta, Full Professor and Chair of Neurology in the Department of Neuroscience at the University of Padua
