= Rathvel =

Ski resort in Switzerland

- Interactive map of Rathvel
- Location: Switzerland
- Coordinates: 46°32′40″N 6°58′49″E
- Top elevation: 1,481 m (4,859 ft)
- Base elevation: 1,185 m (3,888 ft)
- Skiable area: 8 km of runs
- Trails: 5 (easy 2, intermediate 3)
- Lift system: 4 (3 surface lifts, 1 ski tows)
- Website: http://www.rathvel.ch

Le Rathvel is a small ski resort of the Swiss Prealps, located in the canton of Fribourg.

== Geography ==
Rathvel belongs to the municipality of Châtel-Saint-Denis. It is situated 5 km north of Les Paccots, another small ski resort.

== Winter activities ==
The ski pistes are situated on the eastern slopes of the Niremont. The maximal difference in altitude is approximately 300 m.

On Fridays, an 800-meter long piste is illuminated for night skiing.

Rathvel ski resort is particularly well-suited for beginners and children.

== See also ==
- Les Paccots
- List of ski areas and resorts in Europe
