= Corbetta (mountain) =

Mountain in Switzerland

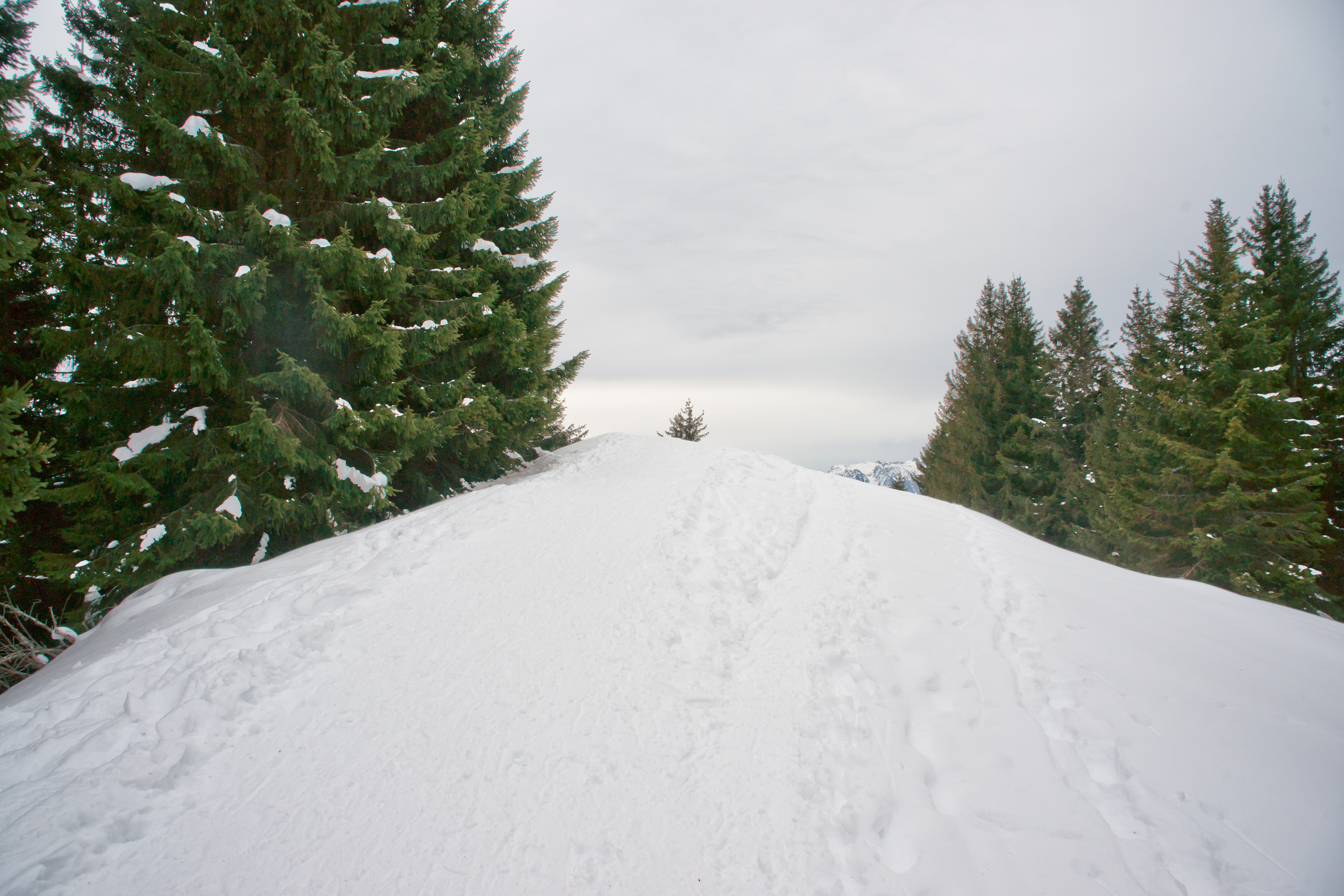
- View of the summit of Corbetta

Highest point
- Elevation: 1,401 m (4,596 ft)
- Prominence: 204 m (669 ft)
- Coordinates: 46°30′44″N 6°56′06″E

Geography
- Location within Switzerland
- Location: Fribourg, Switzerland
- Parent range: Swiss Prealps

Corbetta (1,401 m) is a mountain of the Swiss Prealps, in the canton of Fribourg.

== Geography ==
=== Situation ===
Corbetta stands between the Swiss Plateau and the Swiss Alps. The city of Châtel-St-Denis and the A12 motorway are located on its western foot. The village of Les Paccots is located on its north and east slopes.

The summit provides a panoramic view of the Dent de Lys, lake of Geneva, and the Jura Mountains.

=== Hydrology ===
On its north foot lies the Veveyse de Châtel river, feeding the lake of Geneva. On the east foothills, at 1,235 m, lies the protected site of the Lac des Joncs.

== Activities ==
Corbetta slopes are included in the small ski resort of Les Paccots. Three surface lifts bring the skiers to the summit.
