= Vanil des Artses =

Mountain in Switzerland

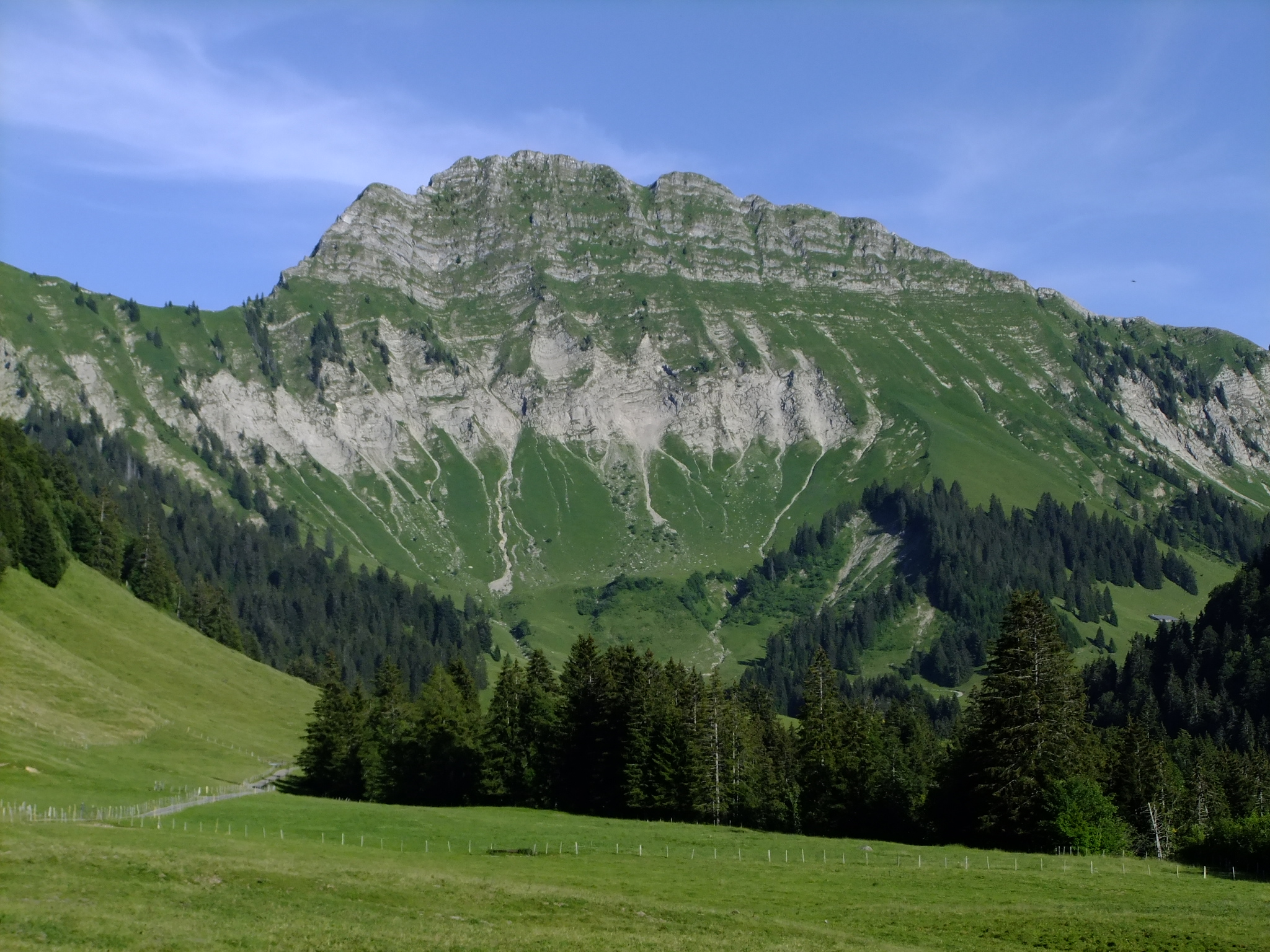
- View from the west side

Highest point
- Elevation: 1,992 m (6,535 ft)
- Prominence: 290 m (950 ft)
- Parent peak: Dent de Lys
- Coordinates: 46°28′56″N 6°59′14″E

Geography
- Location within Switzerland
- Location: Fribourg, Switzerland
- Parent range: Swiss Prealps

The Vanil des Artses (1,992 m) is a mountain of the Swiss Prealps, located west of Montbovon in the canton of Fribourg. It is among a crest of peaks extending south of the Dent de Lys to the Cape au Moine (1,941m) on the border between the Cantons of Vaud and Fribourg, which in turn is just north of the Col de Jaman from Rochers de Naye, all lying on the range between Lake Geneva and the valley of Gruyère.

On 23 August 2013, a team of spelunkers organized by l’Association des Folliu-Bornés ascended caves in the interior of the mountain to reach the summit.
