= Les Paccots =

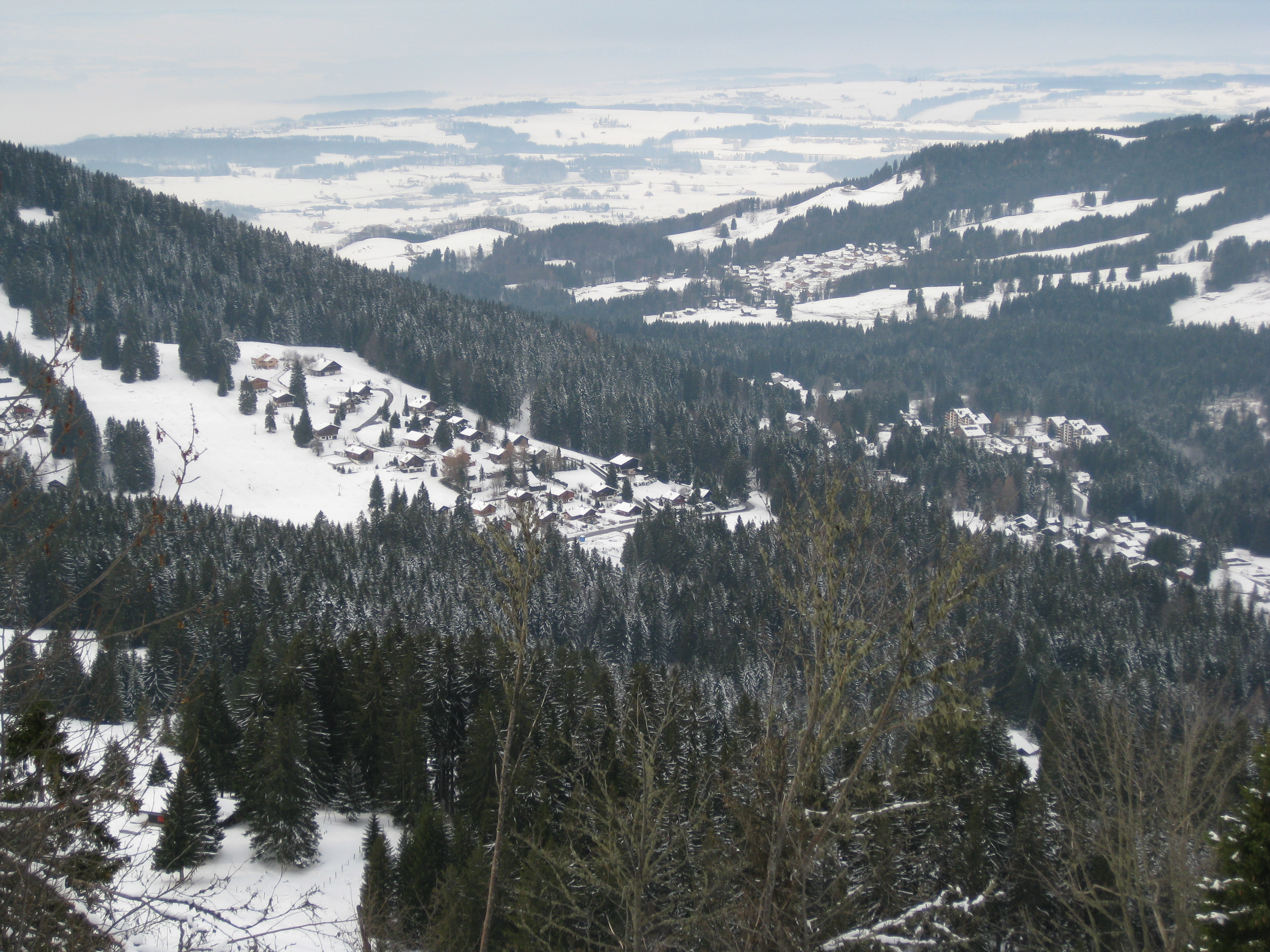
- Les Paccots
- Interactive map of Les Paccots
- Location: Switzerland
- Coordinates: 46°31′20″N 6°56′53″E
- Top elevation: 1,487 m (4,879 ft)
- Base elevation: 1,060 m (3,480 ft)
- Skiable area: 20 km of runs
- Trails: 11 (easy 8, intermediate 2, difficult 1)
- Lift system: 11 (8 surface lifts, 3 ski tows)
- Terrain parks: 1
- Website: http://www.les-paccots.ch

Les Paccots is a village and a small ski resort of the Swiss Prealps, located in the canton of Fribourg.

== Geography ==
The village is situated in the south-west part of the canton, east of Châtel-Saint-Denis, at a height of 1,061 metres above sea level. It belongs to the municipality of Châtel-Saint-Denis.

Les Paccots is situated in the valley of La Veveyse de Châtel and is surrounded by mountains of which the highest are the Dent de Lys (2,014 m), Teysachaux (1,909 m), the Niremont (1,514 m), and Corbetta (1,401 m).

== Winter activities ==
Due to its proximity with Lausanne, Montreux and Fribourg, and its easy access from the A12 motorway (3,5 km from exit "Châtel-St-Denis"), Les Paccots is a popular ski resort. The majority of ski pistes are suitable for beginners or children.

It's possible to explore many nearby hills and mountains by snowshoeing or ski touring and stop at mountain huts to taste the traditional dishes of the region.

An ice rink completes the touristic offer.

== Summer activities ==
Hiking and mountain biking can be practiced in Les Paccots region.

One can learn about the flora, fauna and local produces through guided tours and educational paths. The protected site of the lac des Joncs displays rare animals and plants such as the dwarf water lily.

Since 2012, 600 contestants meet each year at the "Trail des Paccots". This race offers three different routes : 17, 27 and 42 km. The longest one grants 1 qualifying point for the Ultra-Trail du Mont-Blanc race.

== See also ==
- Châtel-St-Denis
- Lac des Joncs
- List of ski areas and resorts in Europe
