= Dent de Lys =

Mountain in Switzerland

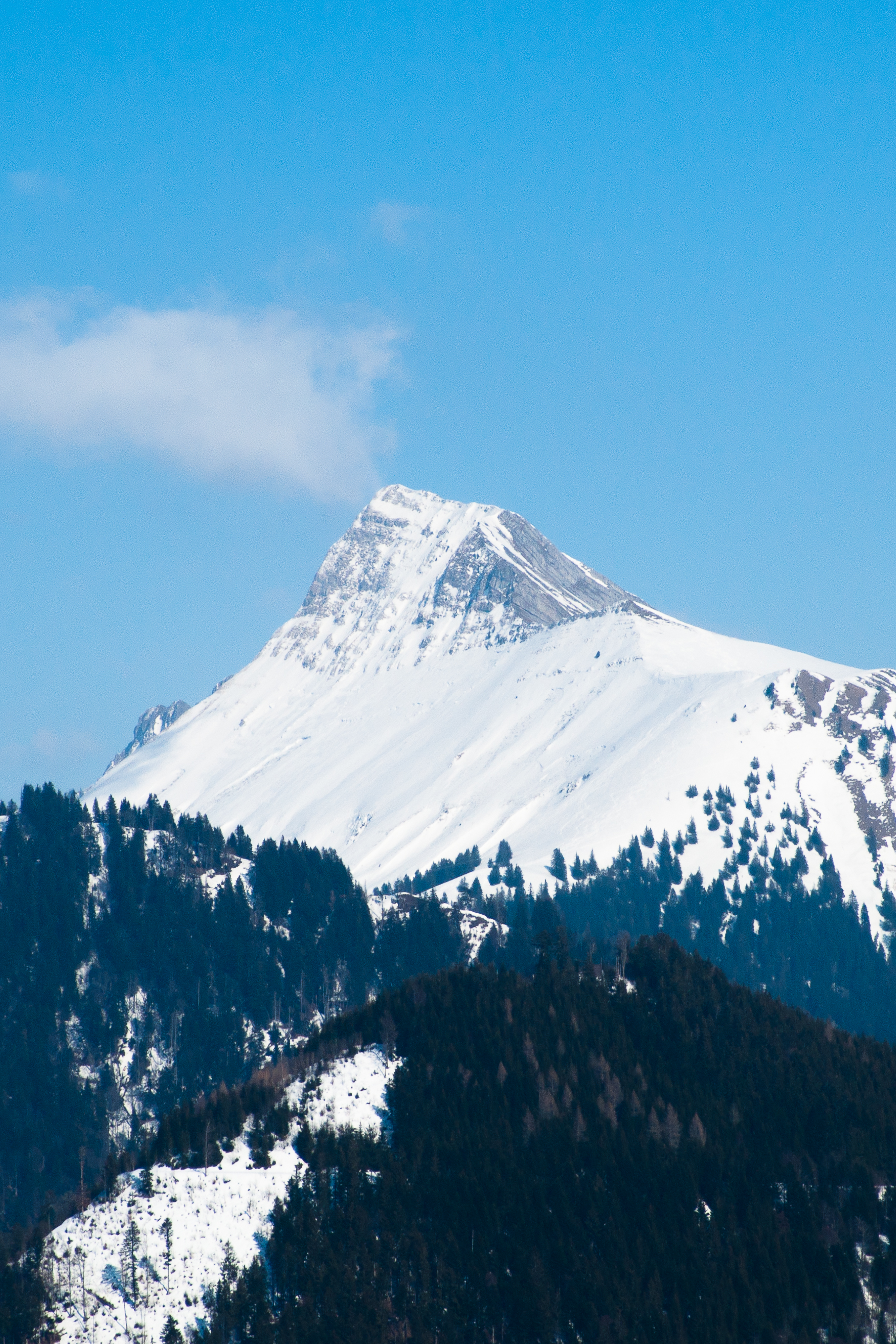
- View from Les Pléiades (west side)

Highest point
- Elevation: 2,014 m (6,608 ft)
- Prominence: 502 m (1,647 ft)
- Coordinates: 46°30′27.5″N 7°0′10.6″E

Geography
- Location within Switzerland
- Location: Fribourg, Switzerland
- Parent range: Bernese Alps

The Dent de Lys (2,014 m) is a mountain in the Bernese Alps (Swiss Prealps), in the canton of Fribourg.

== Geography ==
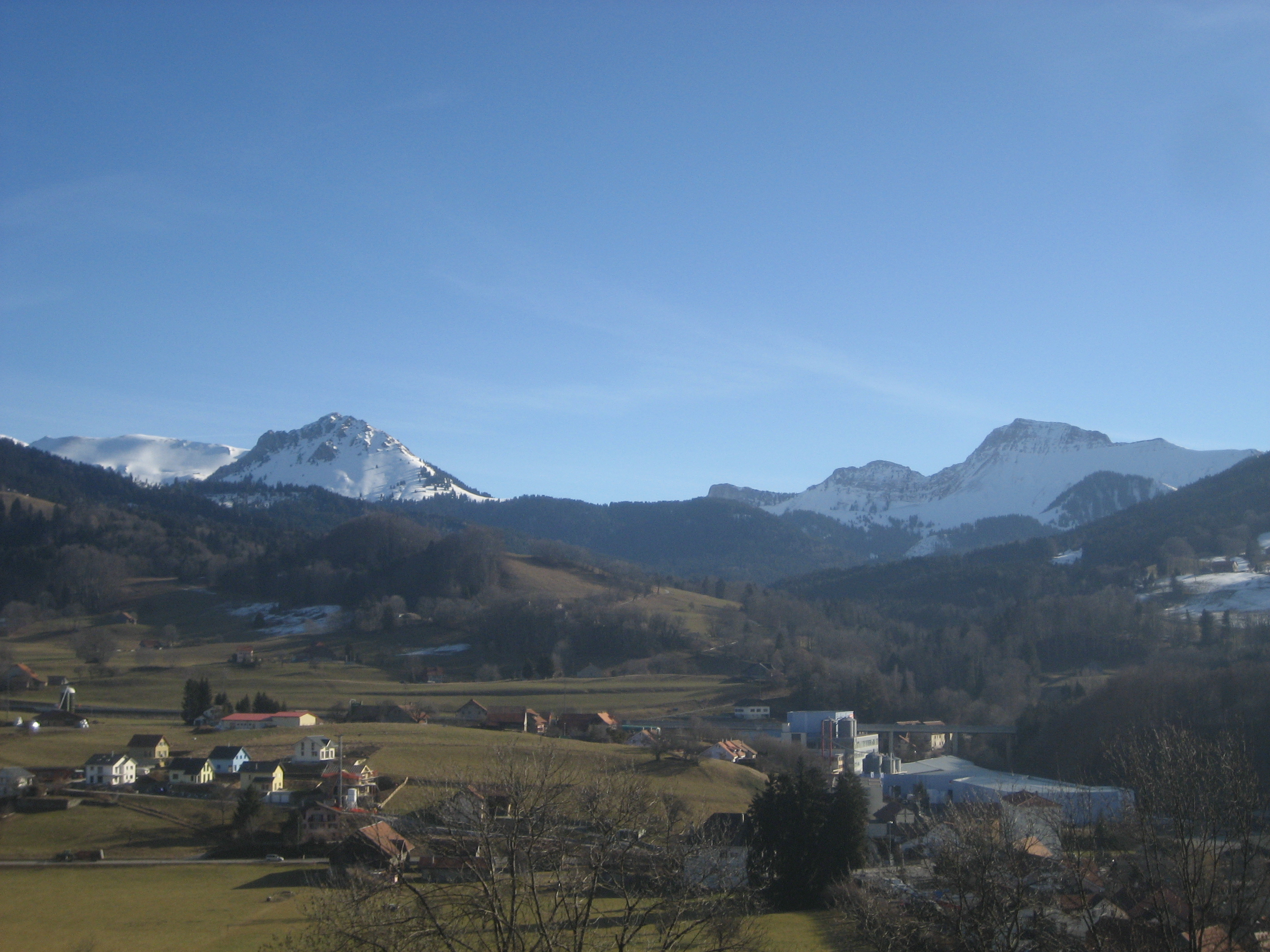
The Dent de Lys is on the right.

The Dent de Lys is the natural border of the municipalities of Châtel-St-Denis (west side) and Haut-Intyamon on the east side.

If we follow its south ridge, we can find Folliu Borna (1,849 m, the Vanil des Artses (1,993 m), the Cape au Moine (1,941 m), the Dent de Jaman (1,875 m) and finally les Rochers de Naye (2,042 m).

== Climbing ==
The col de Lys (1,783 m) allows the hikers and skiers to reach the summit of the Dent de Lys from the east and the west.

Ernest Hemingway mentions the Dent de Lys in his short story Cross Country Snow

On 25 March 1940, a roped party had an accident near the summit. Three climbers died. The only survivor, a Catholic priest, said he was saved by his prayers toward Marguerite Bays (a local girl that eventually became beatified in 1995).

Nowadays, some mortuary crosses can be seen with the name of those who died while tempting the ascent of the summit.

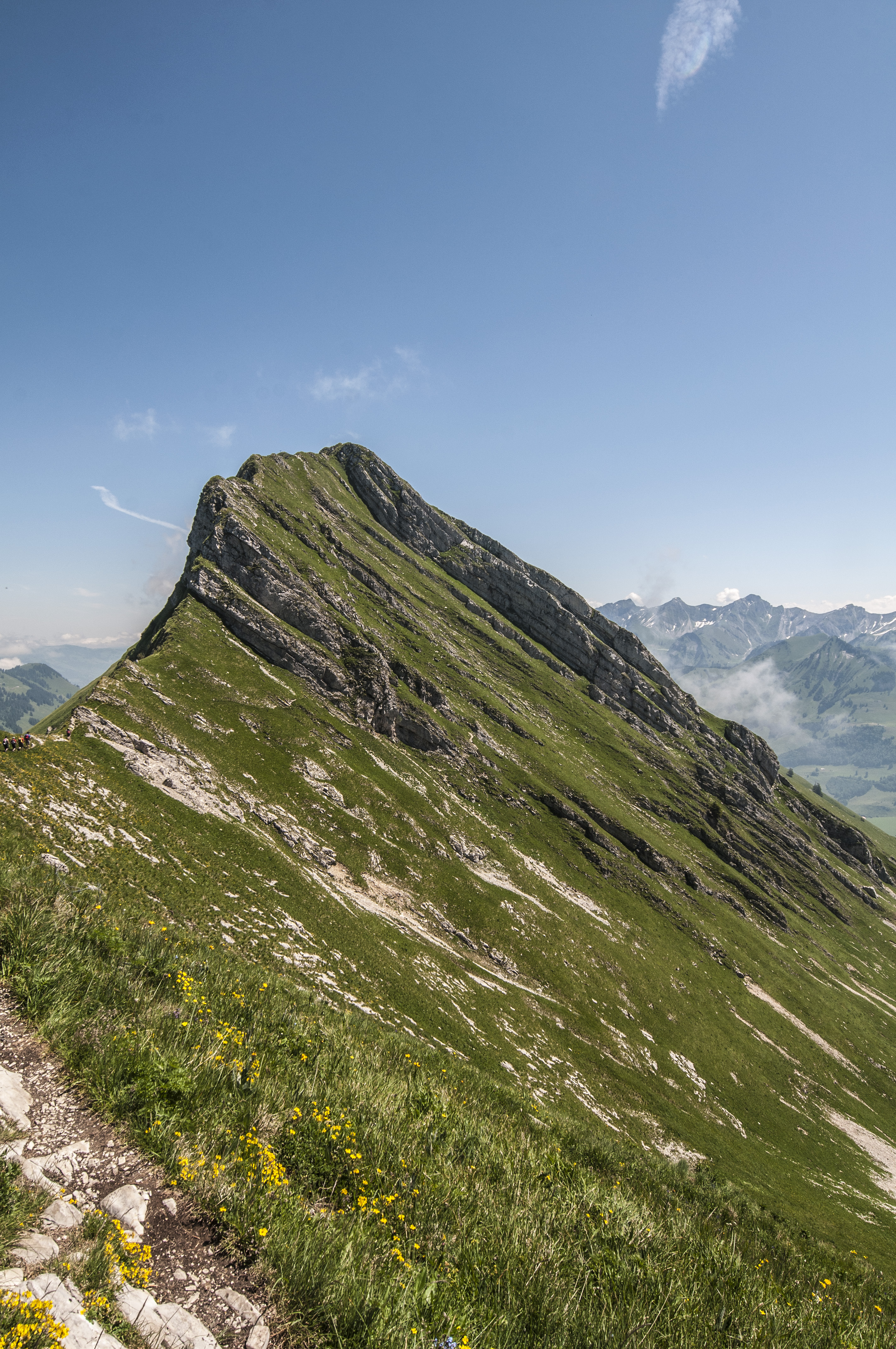
Dent de Lys, seen from the ridge

== See also ==
- le Moléson
