= Niremont =

Mountain in Switzerland

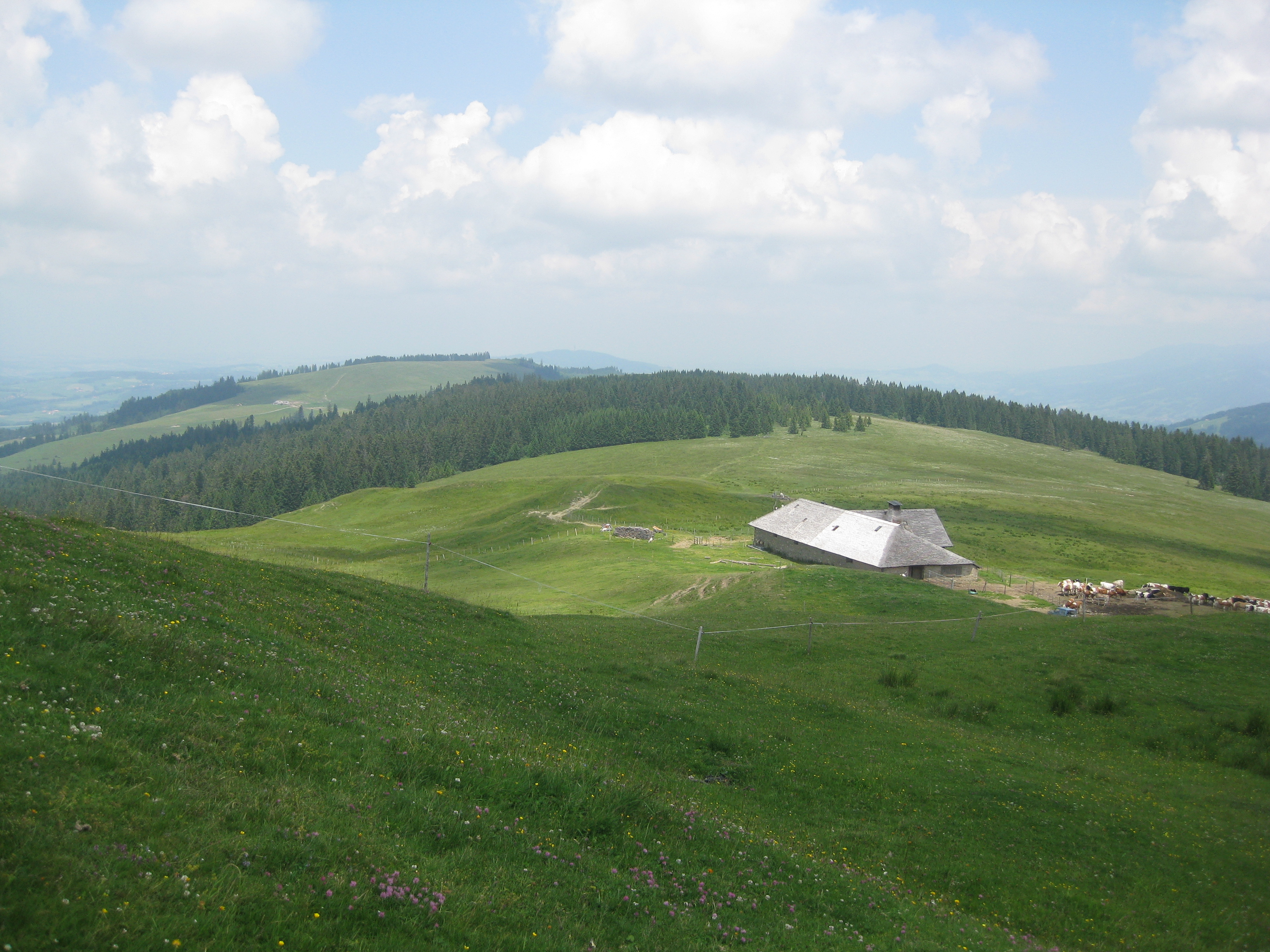
- View from the summit of Niremont

Highest point
- Elevation: 1,514 m (4,967 ft)
- Prominence: 290 m (950 ft)
- Coordinates: 46°32′54″N 6°57′24″E

Geography
- Location within Switzerland
- Location: Fribourg, Switzerland
- Parent range: Swiss Prealps

The Niremont (1,514 m) is a mountain of the Swiss Prealps, in the canton of Fribourg. Due to its rounded shape, it has 2 sub-summits : The Gros Niremont (1,493 m) and the Petit Niremont (1,493 m).

== Toponymy ==
Its name means Noir Mont in French ("Black Mountain").

== Geography ==
=== Situation ===
The Noirmont stands between the Swiss Plateau and the Swiss Alps. The city of Châtel-St-Denis and the A12 motorway are located on its western foot.

The panorama from its summit offers a view on the Moléson, the village of Les Paccots, the lake of Geneva and the Jura Mountains.

=== Hydrology ===
Several small tributaries on the west slopes feed the Trême river. On its south side lies the Veveyse de Châtel river, feeding the lake of Geneva.

=== Fauna and flora ===
The Niremont is covered with pine forests, wetlands and mires. A great proportion (402 hectares) is registered on the Inventory of Mire Landscapes of Particular Beauty and National Importance.

== Activities ==
The small ski resort of Rathvel lies on its eastern slopes. The Niremont is a popular destination for hiking, mountain biking, snowshoeing and ski touring.

== See also ==
- Rathvel
- Les Paccots
- Moléson
