= Dent de Jaman =

Mountain in Switzerland

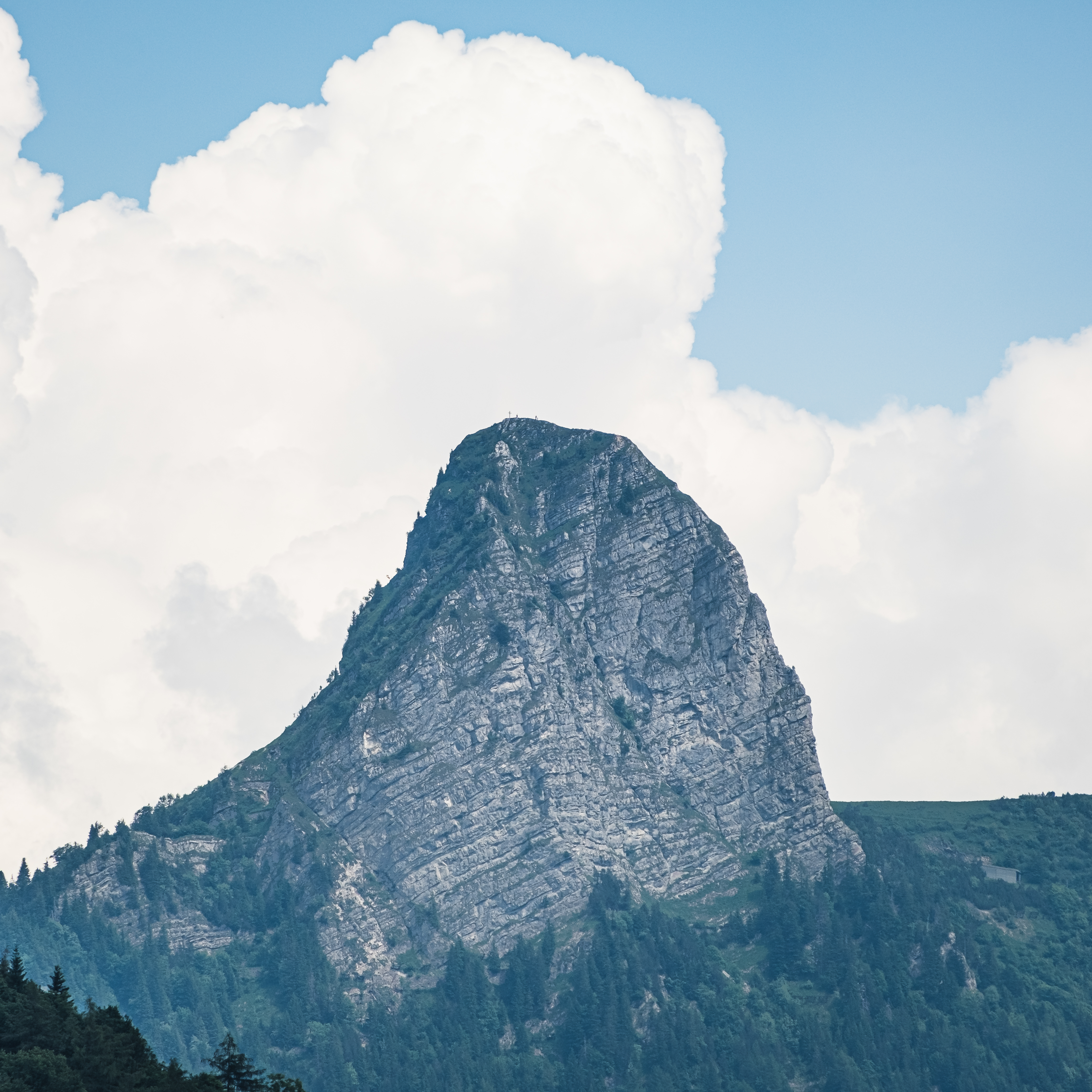
- Dent de Jaman

Highest point
- Elevation: 1,875 m (6,152 ft)
- Prominence: 130 m (430 ft)
- Parent peak: Rochers de Naye
- Listing: List of mountains of Switzerland
- Coordinates: 46°26′41.7″N 6°58′29.5″E

Geography
- Location within Switzerland
- Location: Vaud, Switzerland
- Parent range: Vaudw Alps

Climbing
- Easiest route: trail

The Dent de Jaman is a mountain (1875 m) above Montreux, situated north of the Rochers de Naye.

In August 1830 three Polish romantic poets, Adam Mickiewicz, Zygmunt Krasiński and Antoni Edward Odyniec, climbed the mountain together.
