= Lac des Joncs =

Lake in Fribourg, Switzerland

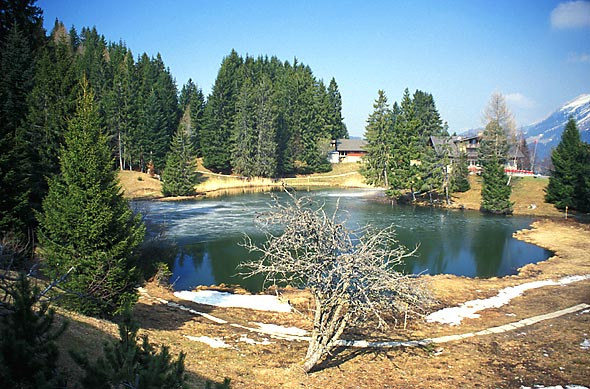
- Lac des Joncs

- Location within Canton of Fribourg Location within Switzerland Location within Alps
- Interactive map of Lac des Joncs
- Location: Les Paccots, Fribourg, Switzerland
- Coordinates: 46°30′47″N 6°56′51″E
- Basin countries: Switzerland
- Max. length: 0.115 km (0.071 mi)
- Max. width: 0.05 km (0.031 mi)
- Surface area: 0.0068 km^{2} (0.0026 sq mi)
- Max. depth: 20 m (66 ft)
- Surface elevation: 1,235 m (4,052 ft)
- Settlements: Les Paccots

The lac des Joncs is a small mountain lake located in Les Paccots, canton of Fribourg, in Switzerland.

== Geography ==
It's situated at an elevation of 1,235 m above sea level. The maximum depth of the lake is approximatively 20 meters. The lake is more than 5,000 years old.

== Fauna and flora ==
The lac des Joncs is a protected site registered on the Swiss Federal Inventory of Amphibian Spawning Areas. A path leads along the lake and one can learn about the specific fauna and flora of the lake on educational boards.

It's one of the four places in Switzerland where it's possible to spot the dwarf water lily.

To help protect the fragile environment of the lake and for safety reasons, swimming, boating, or diving is not allowed.

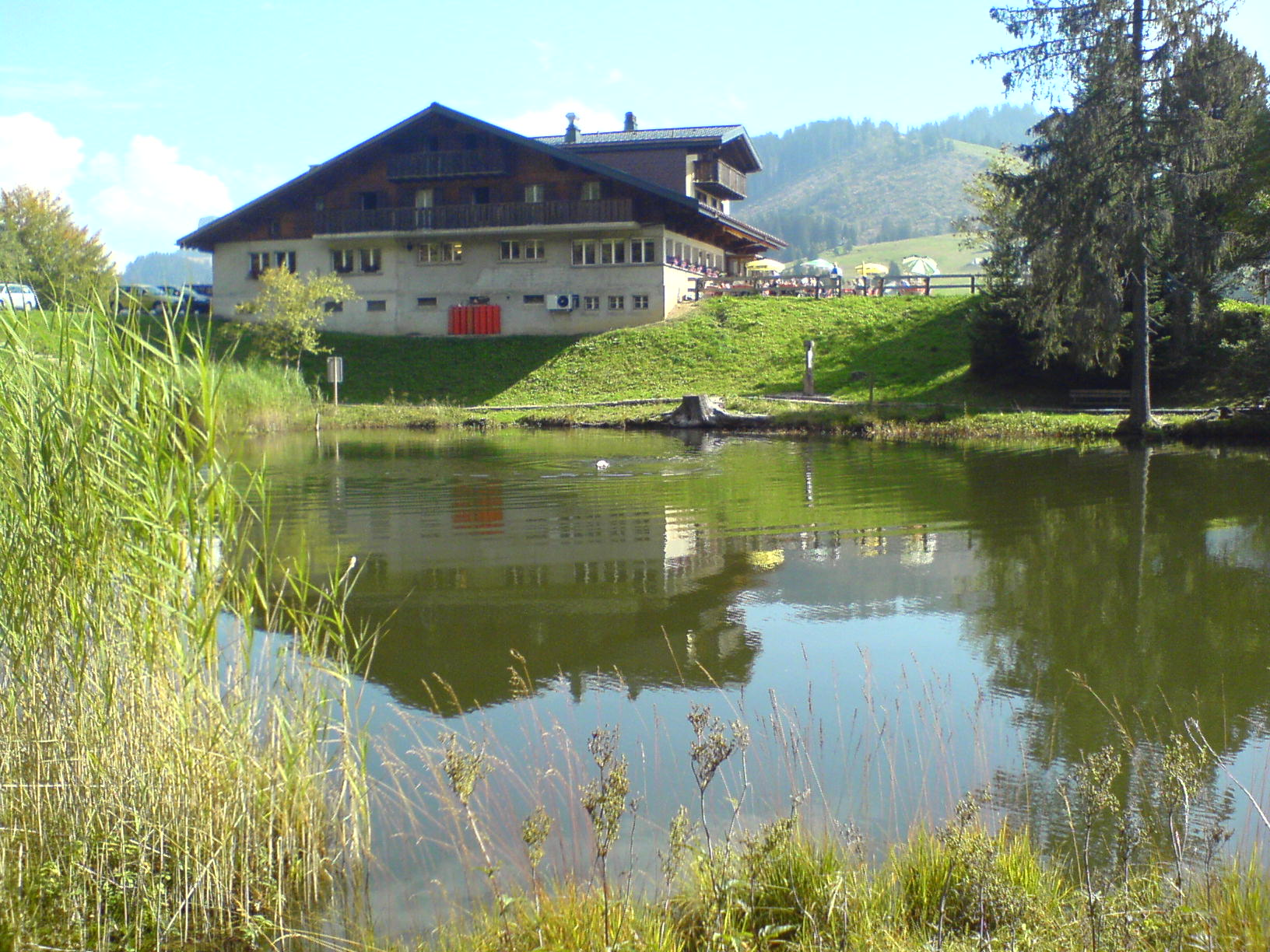
View over the lac des Joncs from its western bank

== See also ==
- Les Paccots
