= Rochers de Naye =

Mountain in Switzerland

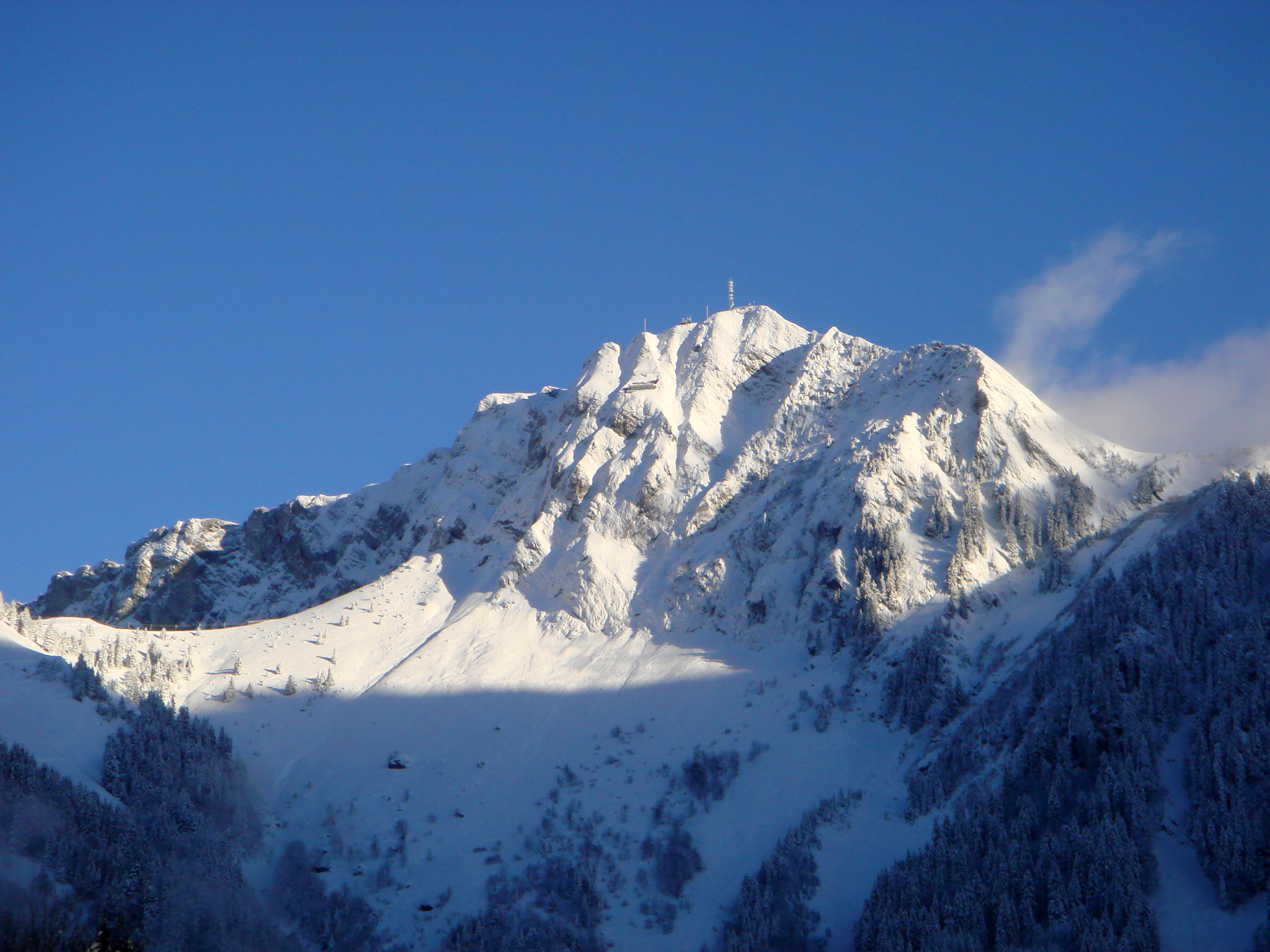

Highest point
- Elevation: 2,042 m (6,699 ft)
- Prominence: 582 m (1,909 ft)
- Parent peak: Tour d'Aï
- Isolation: 6.0 km (3.7 mi)
- Coordinates: 46°25′55″N 6°58′34.2″E

Geography
- Location within Switzerland
- Location: Vaud, Switzerland
- Parent range: Bernese Alps

The Rochers de Naye (French, lit. "rocks of Naye"; 2,042 metres (6,699 ft)) is a mountain of the Swiss Alps, overlooking Lake Geneva near Montreux and Villeneuve, in the canton of Vaud. It lies on the range separating the basin of Lake Geneva from the valley of the Sarine, on the watershed between the Rhone and the Rhine. The mountain is partially located in the canton of Fribourg, the border between the two cantons culminating on a lower summit named Grande Chaux de Naye (1,982 metres (6,503 ft)).

The Rochers de Naye is easily accessible from Montreux, where the highest railway in the canton, the Montreux–Glion–Rochers-de-Naye railway line, starts. From the summit station (1,968 metres (6,457 ft)), only a short walk is necessary to reach the summit. In addition, it is also possible to access the summit by driving to Col de Jaman and then making the 2-3 hr hike to the peak.

The Rochers de Naye is also known for the Rochers de Naye Via Ferrata considered to be extremely difficult (ED), the Grottes de Naye (caves which are accessible via the trail between Col de Jaman and Rochers de Naye), and a few enclosures hosting marmots from around the world.

== Gallery ==
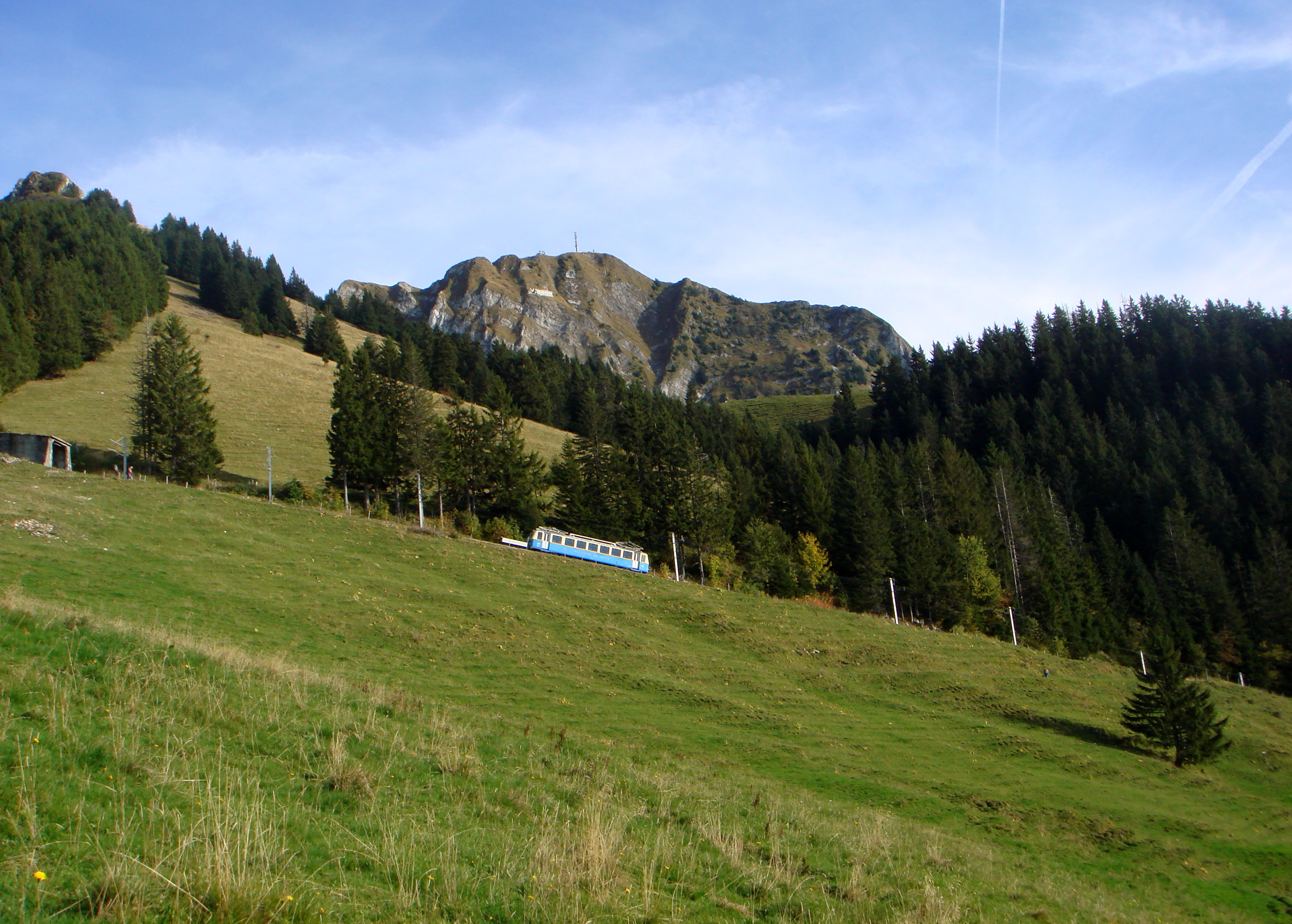
A train ascending the mountain.

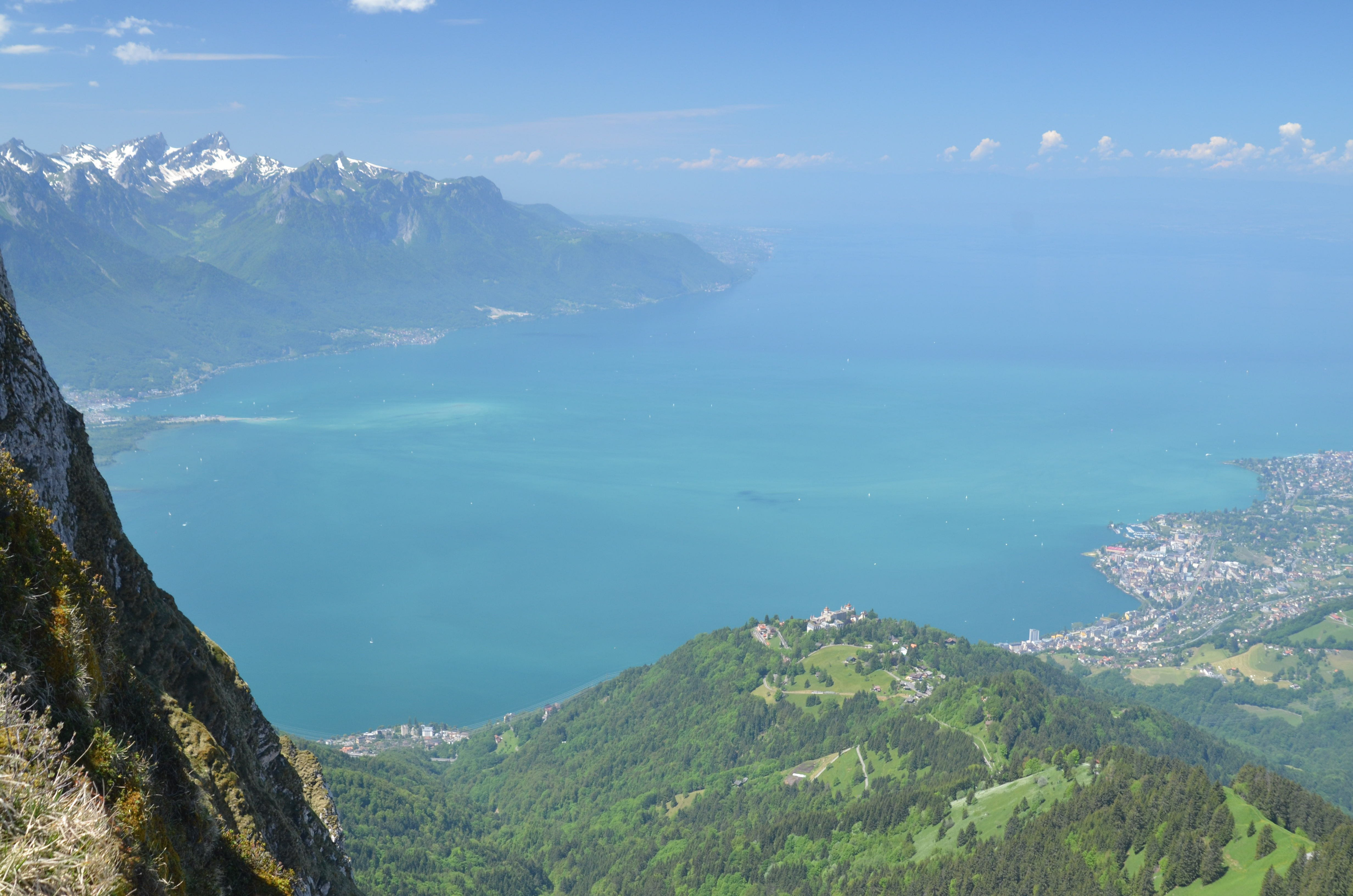
View from the summit towards Lake Geneva.

== See also ==
- List of mountains of Switzerland accessible by public transport
