= Col de Jaman =

Mountain pass in the Swiss Alps

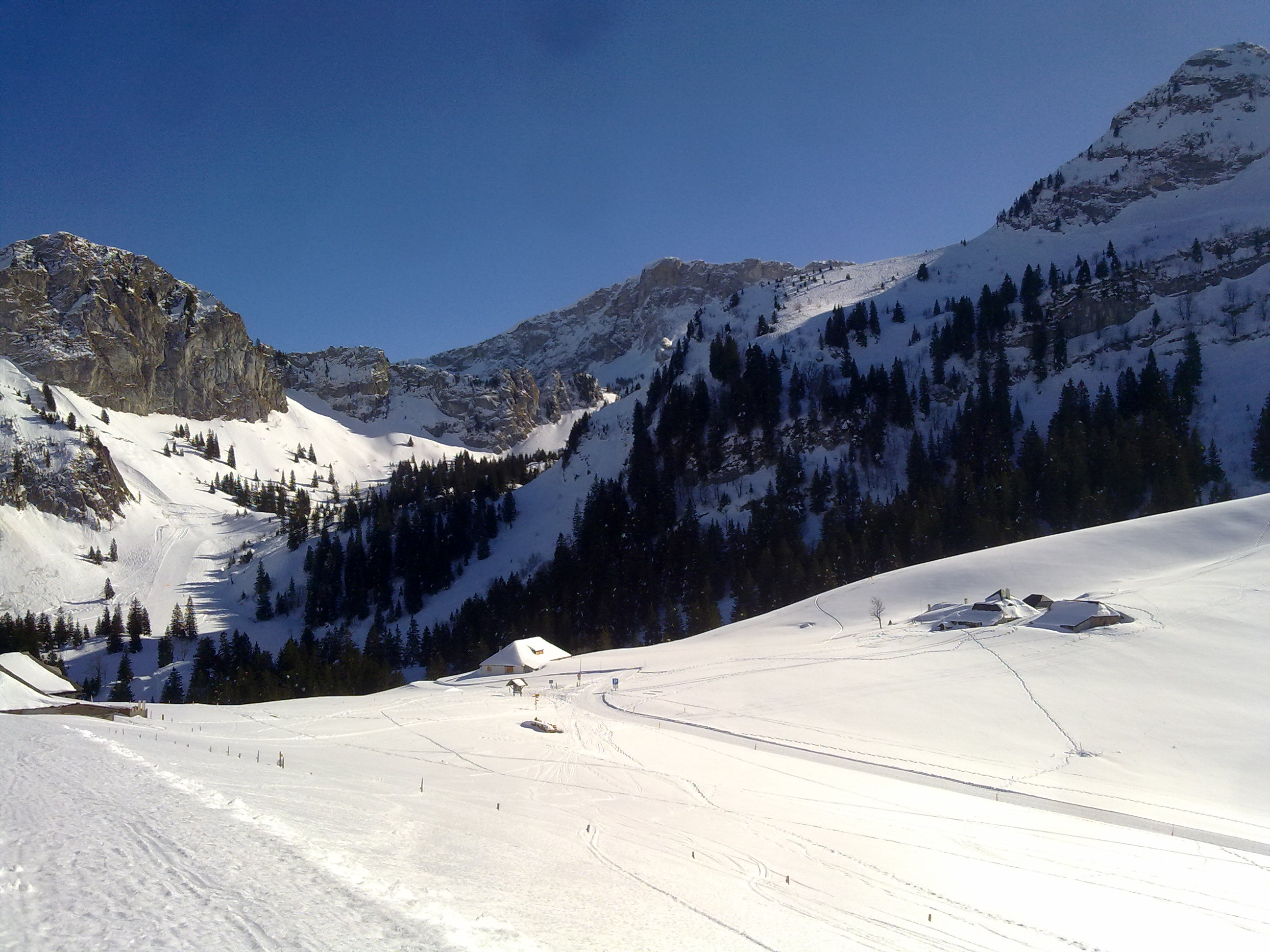
- View of the pass with the Dent de Jaman (right summit)

- Location within Switzerland
- Elevation: 1,512 metres (4,961 ft)
- Traversed by: Trail (dead end road)

Third Approach
- Location: Vaud, Switzerland
- Range: Alps
- Coordinates: 46°27′05″N 06°58′38″E

The Col de Jaman (1,512 m) is a mountain pass in the western Swiss Alps, connecting Montreux in the canton of Vaud to Montbovon in the canton of Fribourg. The pass itself, overlooked by the Dent de Jaman, is located within the canton of Vaud, the border with the canton of Fribourg running one kilometre east.

The pass is connected to Les Avants by a paved road. A railway tunnel (Montreux–Lenk im Simmental line) runs below the pass.

== See also ==
- List of mountain passes in Switzerland
